= Reinhardswald =

Range of hills in Kassel, Hesse, Germany

Coordinates: 51°31′N 9°31′E

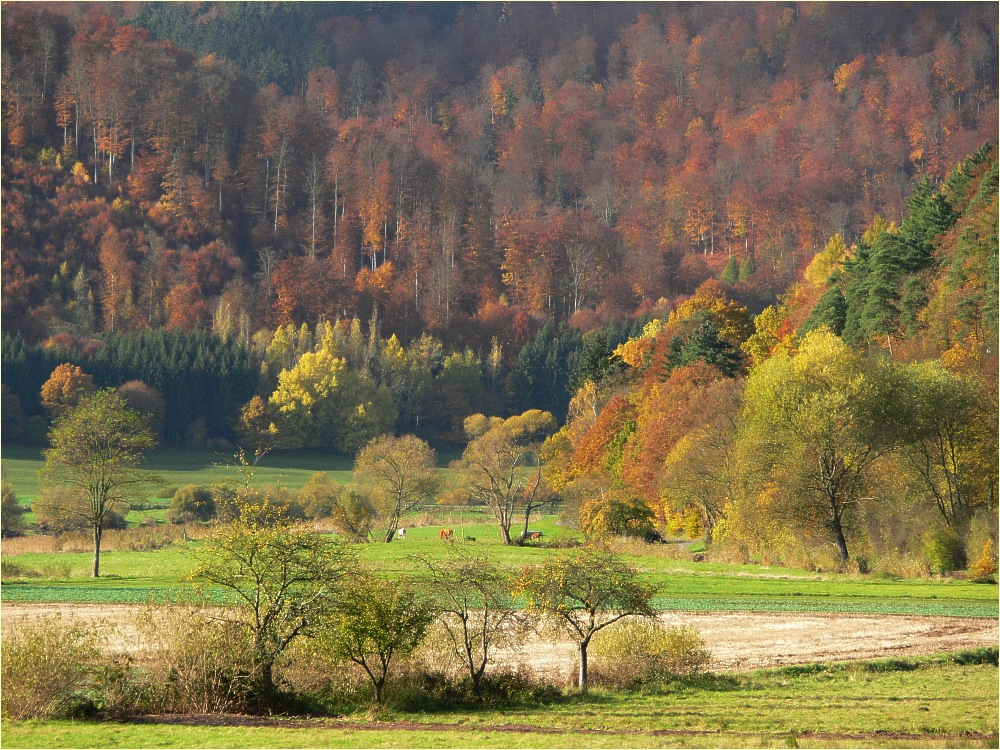
Valley of the Weser with the Reinhardswald

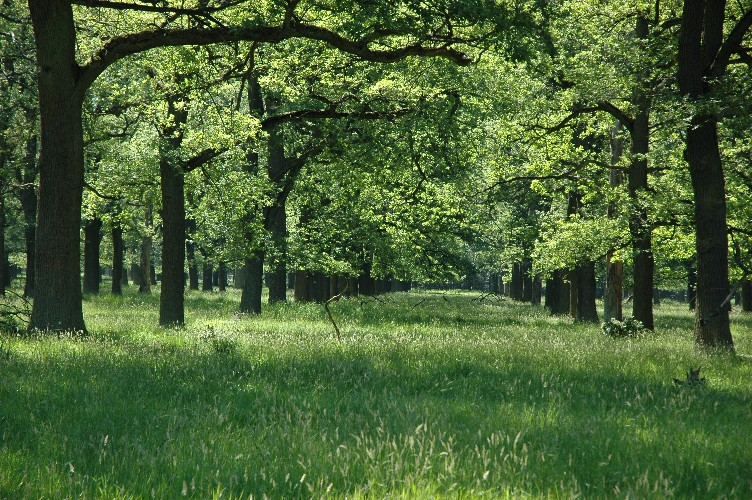
Oak stand in the Reinhardswald

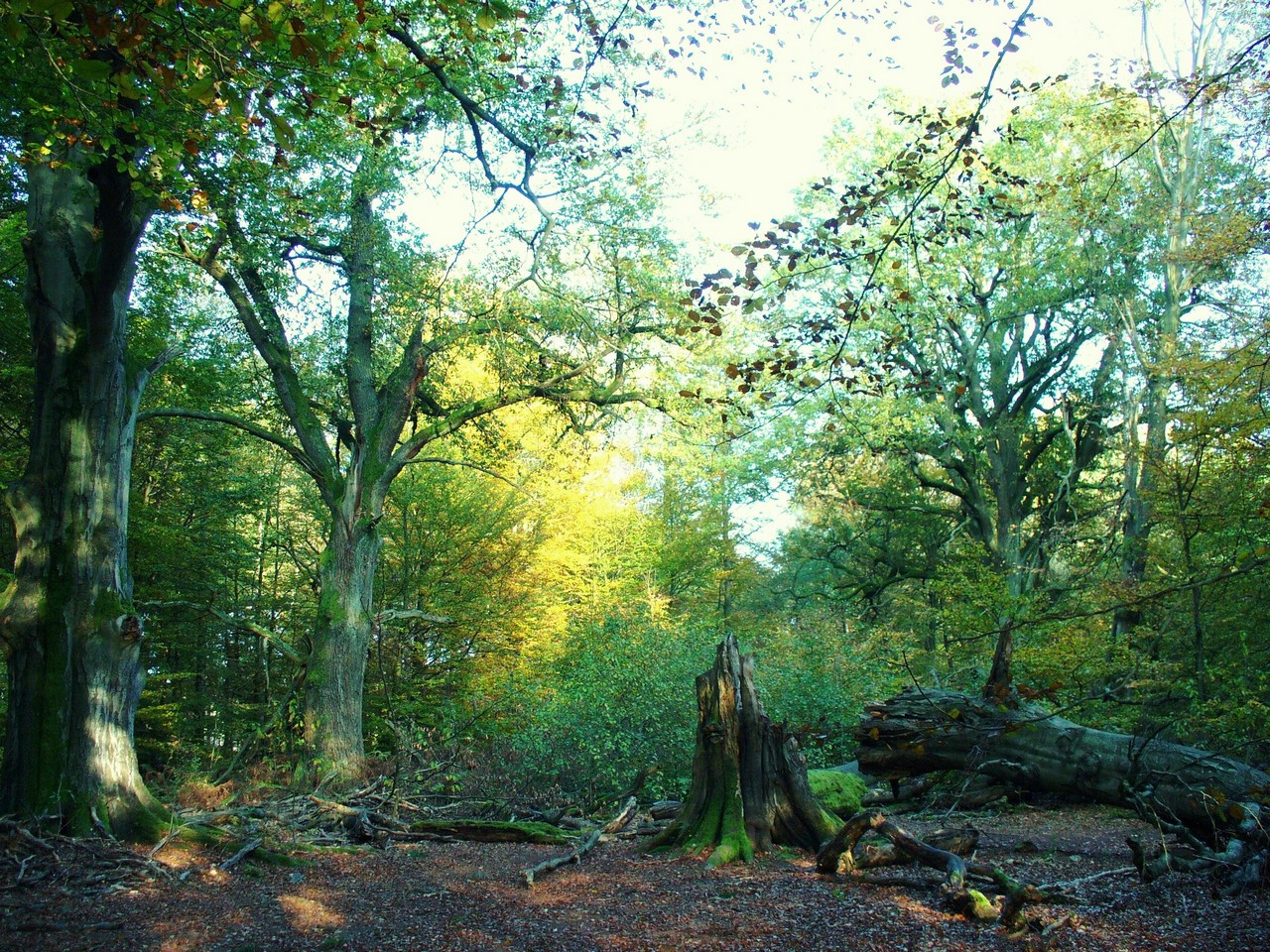
In the Reinhardswald: the ancient forest of Sababurg

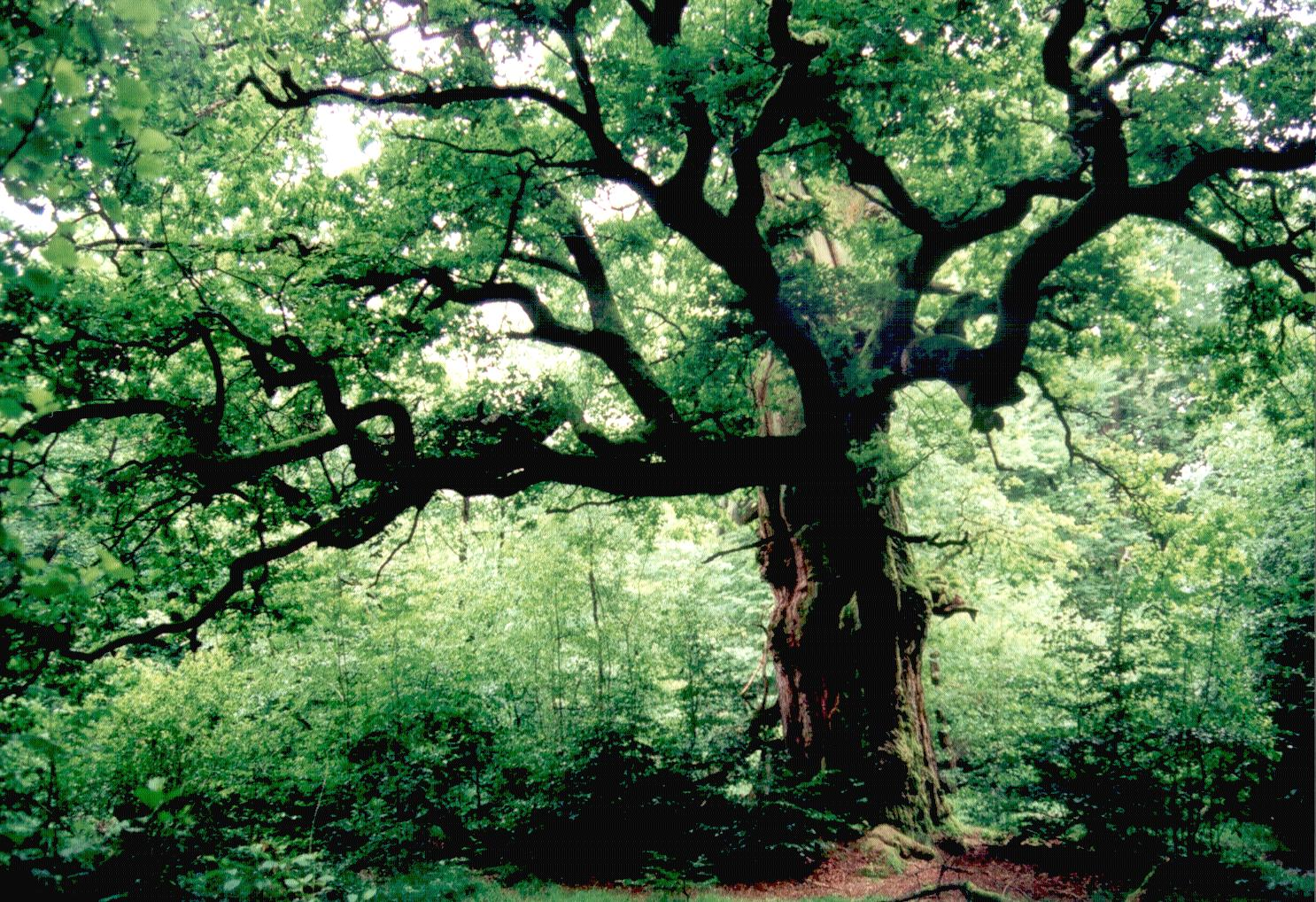
Old oaks in the ancient forest of Sababurg

The Reinhardswald (German pronunciation: [ˈʁaɪnhaʁtsˌvalt]) is a range of hills up to 472.2 m above sea level (NN) and covering an area of over 200 km² in the Weser Uplands in the district of Kassel, Hesse (Germany). Of this, 183 km² are part of the unincorporated area known as Gutsbezirk Reinhardswald.

The area is known for its myths and legends, such as Grimms' Fairy Tales, and the "Sleeping Beauty" castle of Sababurg is internationally known.

== Geography ==
The Reinhardswald is located in the north of North Hesse between Kassel and Bad Karlshafen, Hann. Münden and Hofgeismar. In the north and east this woodland area runs up against the Weser and, in the southeast and south against the Fulda; both rivers form locally the border with Lower Saxony. In the west it borders partly on the Esse and, in the northwest, on the Diemel.

To the north of the Reinhardswald, on the far side of the Weser, is the Solling, to the northeast is the Kiffing and to the east, the Bramwald. To the southeast, beyond the Fulda, is the Kaufungen Forest; not far away to the southwest of the Reinhardswald the Habichtswald looks down on the Kassel Basin.

== Description ==
The Reinhardswald comprises a very extensive, gently folded, extremely thickly forested and almost uninhabited Bunter sandstone plateau, which rises from about 200 m up to a maximum 472.2 m above NN and which tilts gently towards the west. Its two highest hills, both of which are heavily wooded, are called the Staufenberg (472.2 m) and Gahrenberg (472.1 m).

At over 200 km² in area the Reinhardswald is one of the largest forests and most sparsely populated regions in Germany; within Hesse it is the largest contiguous area of forest. Beech and oak, in particular, thrive here and there are extensive areas of wood pasture (Hutewald).

Only a few country roads cross the Reinhardswald. For instance, to cross the hills in a north-south direction from Helmarshausen via Gottsbüren to Immenhausen-Holzhausen by bicycle or car, requires a drive of about 38 km on mostly empty, small and often very narrow roads that, especially in the south of the forest, are often arrow straight. And apart from Gottsbüren there are no settlements until the southern edge of the Reinhardswald near Holzhausen. The road through the north of the forest is a designated tourist route called the "Weser Renaissance Road" and the road through the southern part of the area is part of the designated tourist route Deutsche Märchenstrasse ("German Fairy Tale Route") (the "Sleeping Beauty Route").

== History ==
=== General ===
The Reinhardswald was once an imperial forest. The northern end between the Weser and the Diemel was gifted by the Emperor, Henry II, to Helmarshausen Abbey; the southern portion went to the Bishopric of Paderborn. Landgrave Henry of Hesse purchased the forest back in 1306 and pledged it in 1355 to Hesse, which then retained possession of the forest permanently and whose princes, especially Philip the Magnanimous used it as a favourite stag-hunting ground.

Mining was carried out in and around the Reinhardswald for centuries. Evidence of brown coal mining at Gahrenberg (locally from 1842 to 1970 in the underground mine) may be found as early as the time of Landgrave William IV in 1575. The early mining of alum ore and quartz sand, which was subsequently extracted in the glassworks at Hann. Münden, is recorded. Around 1592 a trade union was documented in Immenhausen-Holzhausen . From the period between 1611 and 1666 other evidence of mining was recorded.

Extensive wood pastures and old farmyards and farms bear witness to the agricultural tradition of the Reinhardswald.

=== Myths ===
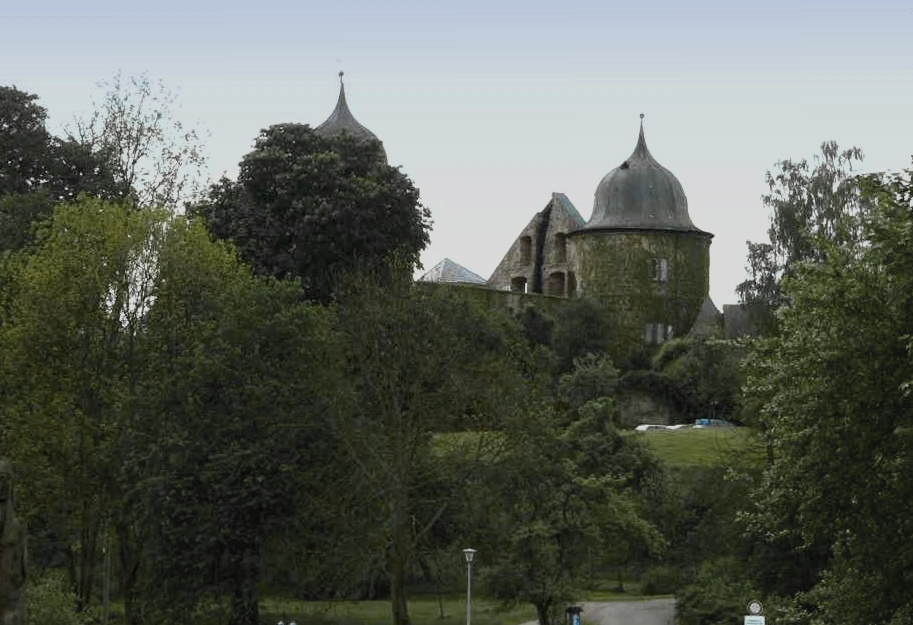
The Sababurg

There are several myths about the origin of the Reinhardswald, of which the most famous are described here:

Version 1: Count Reinhard was a gambler and drinker. One night he was playing with the Bishop of Paderborn. After he had lost all his money, he wagered all his property on a game. He begged for grace and the bishop promised him a harvest wherever he sowed acorns. This popular version is also performed by a theatre group.

Version 2: Count Reinhard ruled the mighty forest, densely occupied by villages, but was sentenced to death for extortion and robbery. At his urgent entreaty he was allowed once more before his execution to cultivate the pastures and harvest them. But craftily, after destroying the villages, he sowed the farmers' fields with acorns, which ripened long after he was dead. Thus the Reinhardswald was born.

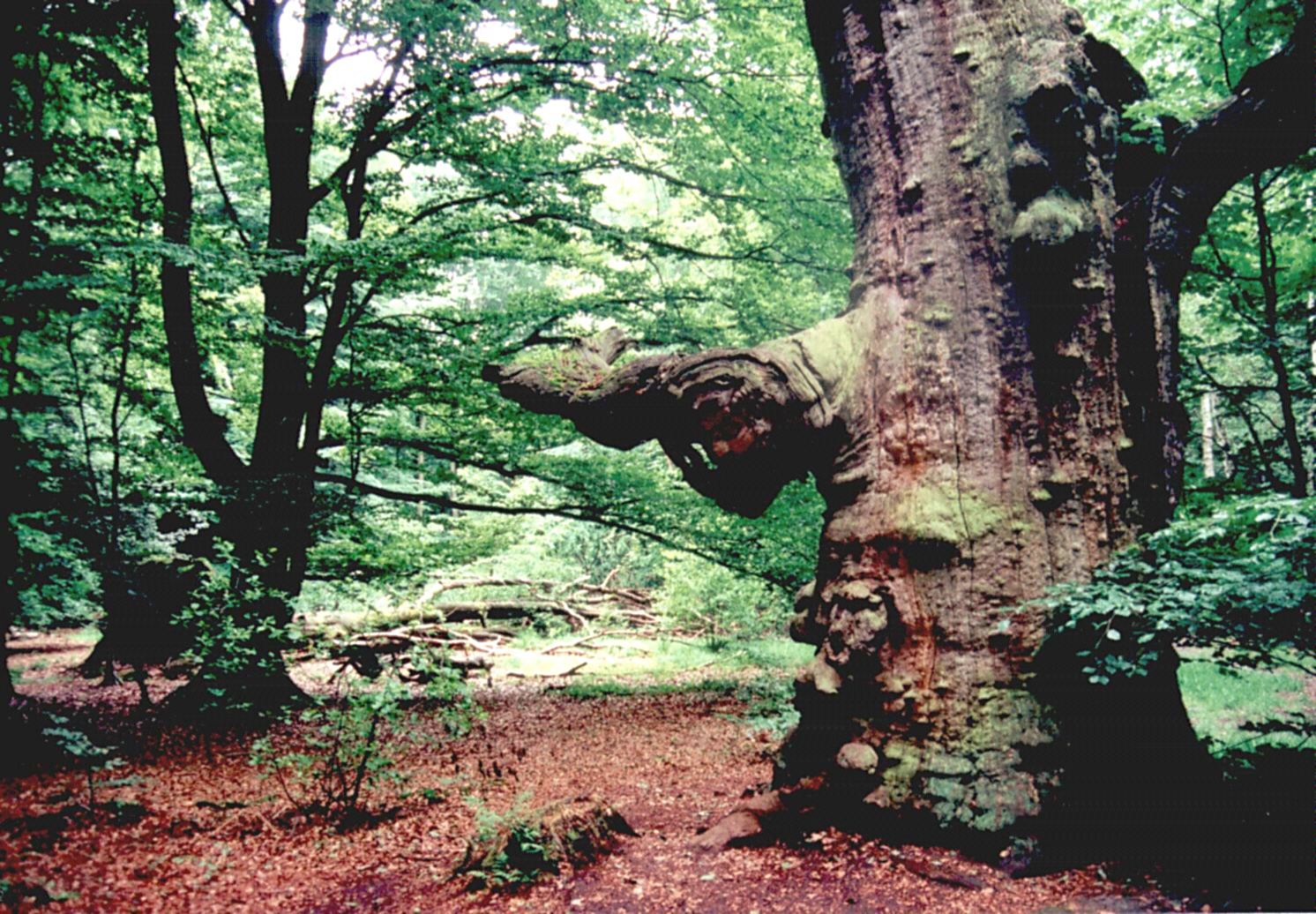
Wood pasture tree in the ancient forest of Sababurg

== Places of interest ==
The best known visitor destination in the Reinhardswald is the so-called "Sleeping Beauty" castle of Sababurg with its wildlife park. In addition the nature reserve of the ancient forest of Sababurg (Urwald Sababurg), which is located between Sababurg Castle and Hofgeismar-Beberbeck recalls a long-forgotten time and a landscape of virgin forest.

== Controversy over wind power development ==
In early 2022, the Kassel regional council approved a plan to build 18 wind turbines, each 241 meters high, in the Reinhardswald, creating the largest wind farm in Hesse. Promoters claim to be placing the turbines in spots where the forest is already cleared due to damage by storms, summer droughts, and the bark beetle. The plan is opposed by citizen's groups, partly on grounds that the turbines would endanger birds and bats and would harm tourism.

== Hills ==
The hills and elevations within the Reinhardswald and its foothills include (heights in metres above Normalnull):

- Staufenberg (472.2 m)
- Gahrenberg (472.1 m)
- Hahneberg (460.8 m)
- Junkernkopf (451.5 m)
- Mühlenberg (439.0 m)
- Langenberg (423.6 m)
- Kleiner Staufenberg (421.0 m)
- Großer Pinnacker (400.0 m)
- Ahlberg (394.6 m)
- Steinhäufe (391.1 m)
- Knotberg (388.0 m)
- Olbenberg (371.1 m)
- Papenköpfe (367.8 m
- Steinkopf (353.2 m)
- Sandkopf (340.1 m)
- Staufenküppel (333.8 m)
- Kuhberg (326.0 m)
- Grunewaldskopf (324.9 m)
- Kuhläger Kopf (290.5 m)
- Heegeberg (280.2 m)
- Sieburg (274 m)
- Ischenberg (271.8 m)
- Steinkopf (271 m)
- Klipsberg (242 m)
- Kleiner Pinnacker (197.6 m)
- Moosberg (185 m)

== Rivers and streams ==
The Weser flows past just to the east of the Reinhardswald in a deeply incised valley. To the southeast is the equally deep valley of the Fulda; to the west the little Esse and, to the northeast, the Diemel. The Holzape is the longest stream within the uplands themselves, and is fed by numerous other brooks including the Holzkape and Lempe. There are also many ponds and pools.

== Towns and villages ==
These places are located within the Reinhardswald:

- Gottsbüren
- Hofgeismar-Beberbeck (Gehöft-Ansiedelung)

The following towns and villages lie on the edge of the Reinhardswald:

- in the north: Bad Karlshafen
- in the east Oberweser and Reinhardshagen
- in the southeast Hann. Münden
- in the west Hombressen
- in the southwest Immenhausen

Somewhat further away from the Reinhardswald are:

- in the west Grebenstein, Hofgeismar and Trendelburg
- in the south Kassel

== Literature ==
- Augustins Reisehandbücher (Nr. 4) Der Reinhardswald und Bramwald nebst angrenzenden Gebieten. Kassel (o.J., c. 1920)
- Alfred Bonnemann: Der Reinhardswald. Verlag der Weserbuchhandlung. Hann. Münden 1984
- Hermann-Josef Rapp (Hrsg.): Reinhardswald. Eine Kulturgeschichte. Euregio, Kassel 2002, ISBN 3-933617-12-X

== Film documentaries ==
- Der Baum der Bäume. Geheimnisvolle Reise in die Welt der Eichen, TV documentary by Herbert Ostwald, Germany 2004 – which focuses on the old oak wood pastures of the Reinhardswald.
- Der Reinhardswald, TV documentary by Simone Jung, Germany 2005 - The film by Simone Jung gives an insight into the life of several people who live in the forest. The Sababurg and its restoration is also covered.

== See also ==
- The German Wikipedia entry on Reinhardswald
