= German Fairy Tale Route =

Tourist attraction route in Germany

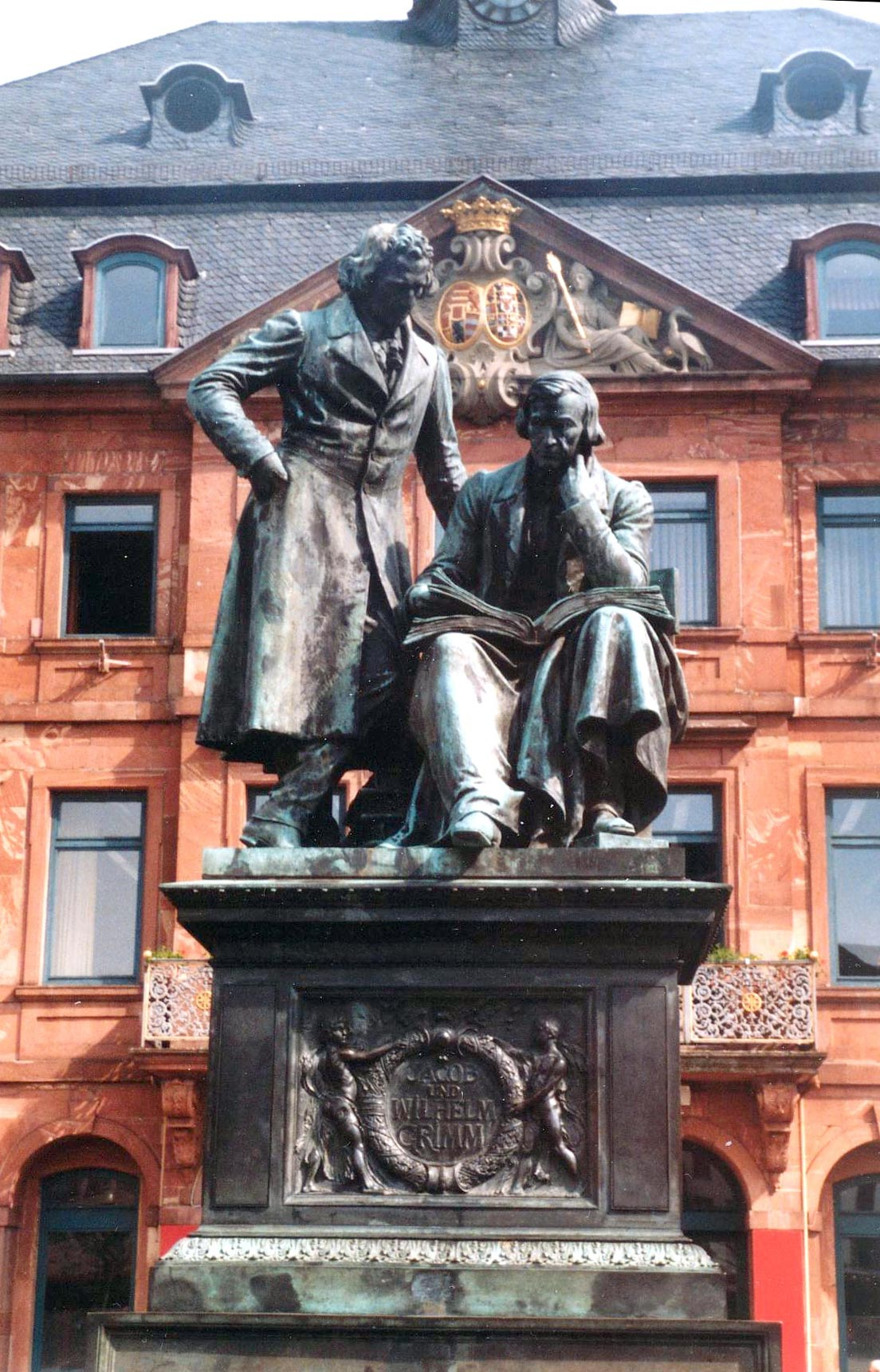
Brothers Grimm Memorial in Hanau, by Syrius Eberle

The German Fairy Tale Route (German: Deutsche Märchenstraße) is a tourist attraction in Germany originally established in 1975. With a length of 600 kilometres (370 mi), the route runs from Hanau in central Germany to Bremen in the north. Tourist attractions along the route are focused around the brothers Wilhelm and Jacob Grimm, including locations where they lived and worked at various stages in their life, as well as regions which are linked to the fairy tales found in the Grimm collection, such as The Town Musicians of Bremen. The Verein Deutsche Märchenstraße society, headquartered in the city of Kassel, is responsible for the route, which travellers can recognize with the help of road signs depicting the heart-shaped body and head of a pretty, princess-like creature.

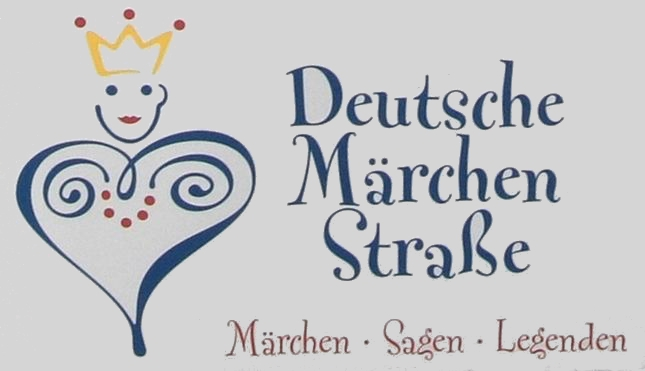
Deutsche Märchenstrasse logo

Plan of the German Fairy Tale Route

== Tourist attractions ==
The German Fairy Tale Route is 370 miles long, leading from Hanau to Bremen. The route includes locations that inspired the Grimms' Fairy Tales, as well as eight nature parks including the Spessart Nature Park, Hoher Vogelsberg Nature Park, Kellerwald-Edersee Nature Park, Meißner-Kaufungen Forest Nature Park, Habichtswald Nature Park and the Weser Uplands Nature Park.

The towns and cities associated with the Brothers Grimm and located along the route are Hanau, Steinau, Marburg and Kassel. The original Children’s and Household Tales (German: Kinder- und Hausmärchen), edited and published by Jacob and Wilhelm Grimm in 1812 and known today as Grimm’s Fairy Tales (German: Grimms Märchen), can be found in Kassel. In 2005, this collection was added to the UNESCO World Document Heritage List. Several places along the Fairy Tale Route are connected with the fairy tales themselves. In the town of Alsfeld, visitors can see what is known as the House of Little Red Riding Hood (Rotkäppchenhaus); the spa Bad Wildungen offers a Snow White Museum (Schneewittchen Museum); and Dorothea Viehmann, from whom the Grimms learned about many of the fairy tales found in their collection, was born in what today is the community of Baunatal. According to legend, the hill Hoher Meissner is where Mother Hulda is said to have resided; Sababurg, located in Reinhardswald Park, is referred to as the Sleeping Beauty Castle. Further attractions include the town of Hamelin, of Pied Piper fame; the spa of Bad Oeynhausen, which has a museum devoted to fairy tales and local legends (Deutsches Märchen- und Wesersagenmuseum); and the city of Bremen, which is famous for the tale of the Town Musicians of Bremen.

Numerous picturesque medieval towns can be found among the Route's attractions as well. In 1975, the Council of Europe awarded Alsfeld the status of a model European community for the conservation of historic buildings. The old centre of the town of Hann. Münden comprises roughly 700 half-timbered houses; the 1300-year-old town of Fritzlar is famous for its imperial cathedral; and Hamelin contains beautiful examples of Weser Renaissance architecture.

The baroque grounds of Philippsruhe Castle in Hanau, the fountain displays in the Hillside Park of Kassel-Wilhelmshöhe, as well as the Bremen Town Hall with the adjacent statue of Roland (both of which are on the UNESCO World Heritage List) are also of particular interest. The 200th anniversary of the first publication of fairy tales by the Brothers Grimm was observed in 2012–2013 with a series of events. Many other events, open-air festivals, exhibits, and performances dealing with the topic of fairy tales are held annually.

== From Hanau to Kassel ==
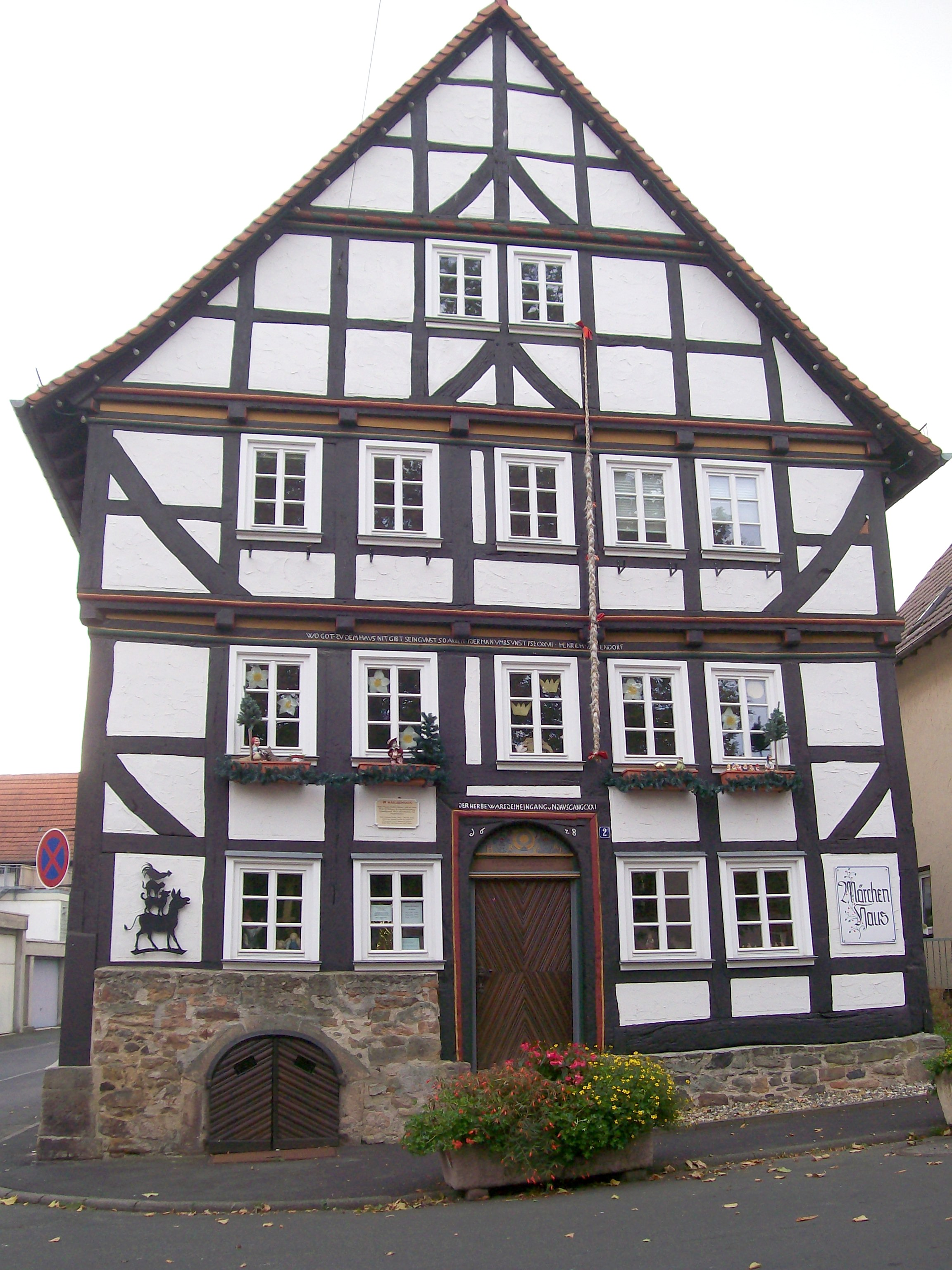
Alsfeld, Fairy Tale House

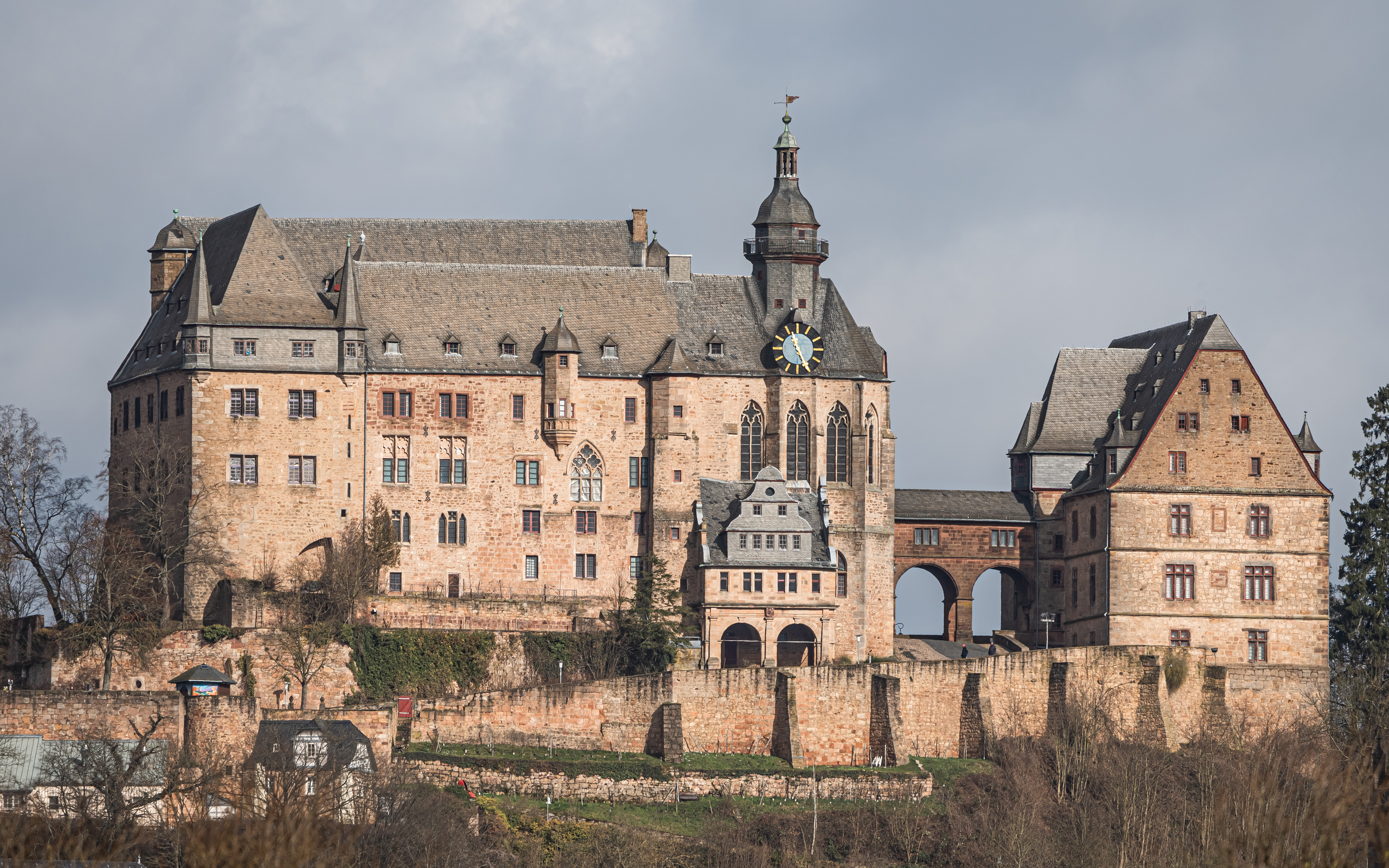
Marburg Castle

The German Fairy Tale Route runs from south to north and passes the following places of interest:

- Hanau (birthplace of the Brothers Grimm)
- Steinau (Grimm House, childhood home of the Brothers Grimm)
- Schlüchtern
- Freiensteinau
- Herbstein
- Marburg (where the Brothers studied)
- Lahntal
- Little Red Riding Hood land—stretching from Alsfeld to Fritzlar
- Alsfeld (Fairy Tale House)
- Neustadt (Hesse)
- Willingshausen
- Schrecksbach
- Schwalmstadt
- Oberaula
- Knüllwald
- Homberg on Efze
- Fritzlar
- Bad Wildungen (Snow White village of Bergfreiheit)
- Waldeck and the Edersee resort area
- Gudensberg
- Niedenstein
- Wolfhagen
- Schauenburg (Schauenburger Märchenwache: a museum dedicated to the locals Marie Hassenpflug and J.F. Krause, both of whom contributed fairy tales to the Grimm collection)
- Baunatal (birthplace of Dorothea Viehmann, from whom the Brothers Grimm learned many of the fairy tales to be found in their collection)
- Kassel (where the brothers attended secondary school and where they lived for 30 years; the Brothers Grimm Museum; the Home of Dorothea Viehmann in the Kassel district of Niederzwehren

== From Kassel to Fürstenberg ==
Between Kassel and Fürstenberg, the Route offers two alternatives:

=== Mother Hulda Route ===
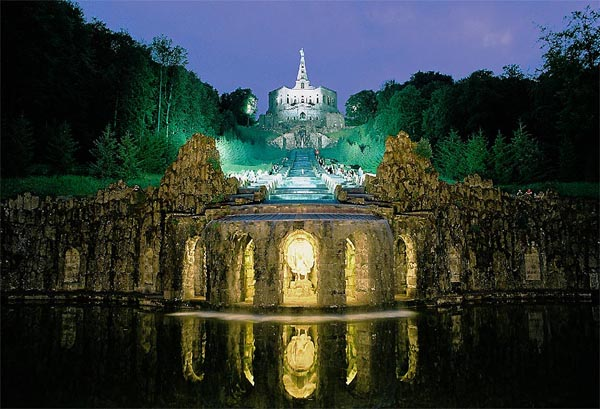
Kassel: Herkules monument by night

- Kassel
- Nieste
- Kaufungen
- Helsa
- Grossalmerode
- Hessisch Lichtenau
- Bad Sooden-Allendorf
- Witzenhausen
- Heilbad Heiligenstadt
- Ebergötzen (Wilhelm Busch)
- Bovenden
- Göttingen (where the Brothers were professors and librarians)
- Wahlsburg
- Fürstenberg (porcelain manufactory)

=== Sleeping Beauty Route ===
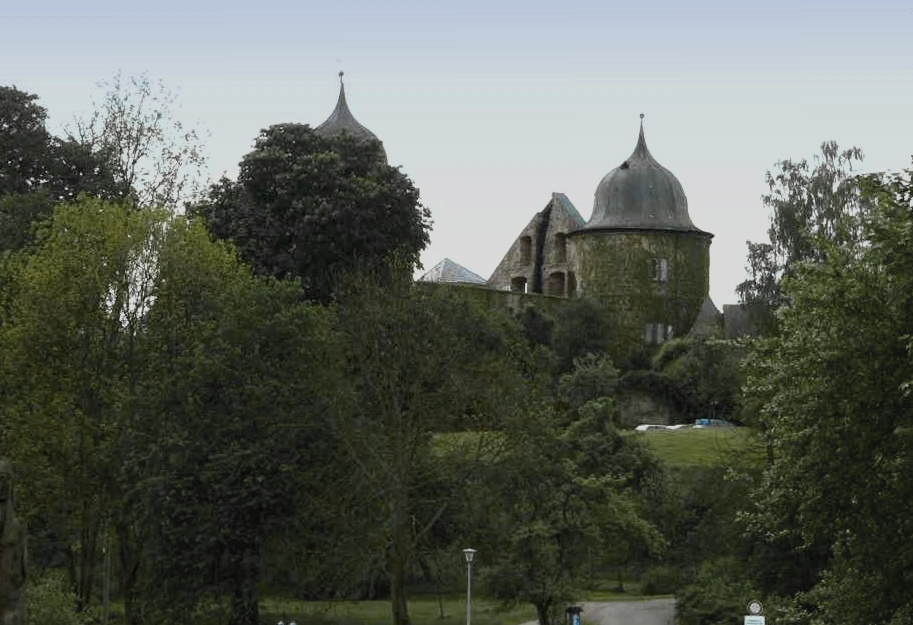
Sleeping Beauty Castle Sababurg

- Kassel
- Hann. Münden (place of death of Johann Andreas Eisenbarth, known as the “travelling surgeon” Doctor Eisenbarth)
- Immenhausen
- Reinhardswald (including Sababurg Castle, known as the Sleeping Beauty Castle)
- Hofgeismar
- Trendelburg
- Oberweser
- Fürstenberg (porcelain manufactory)

== From Fürstenberg to Bremen ==
To the north of Fürstenberg, the Route's two forks rejoin:

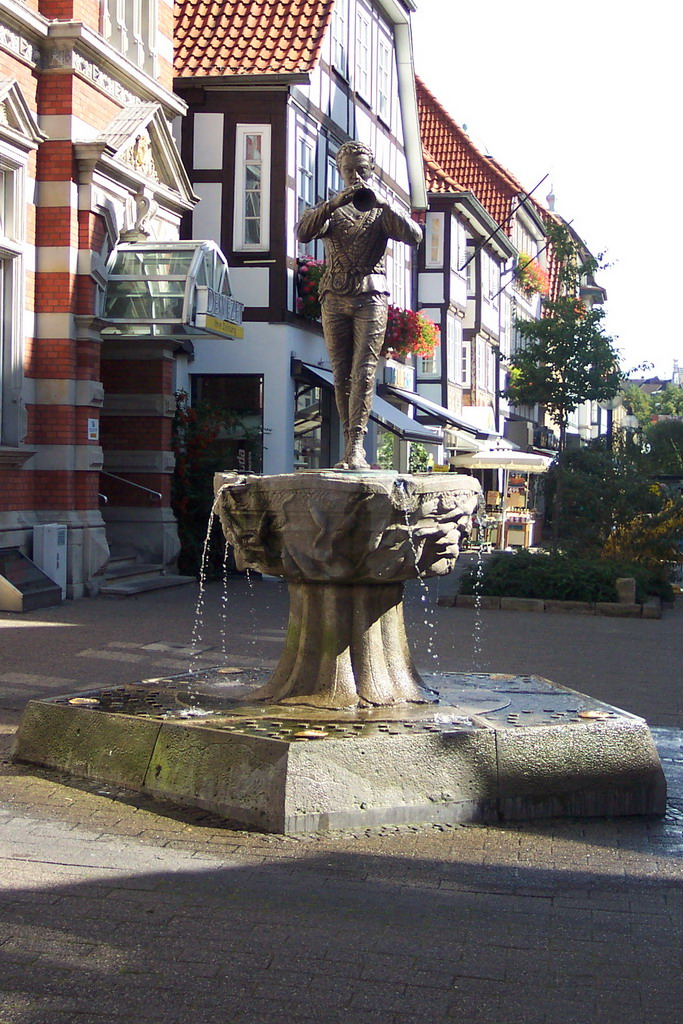
Hamelin: Pied Piper Fountain

- Fürstenberg,
- Polle,
- Bodenwerder (birthplace of Baron Münchhausen),
- Hamelin (setting of the Pied Piper of Hamelin),
- Hessisch Oldendorf (associated with The Legend of Baxmann),
- Bad Oeynhausen (site of a museum devoted to fairy tales and local legends),
- Nienburg,
- Buxtehude (associated with The Hare and the Hedgehog),
- Bremen (associated with The Town Musicians of Bremen),
- Bremerhaven.

== Literature ==
- E. Michael Iba, Thomas L. Johnson: THE GERMAN FAIRY TALE LANDSCAPE - The storied world of the Brothers Grimm, CW Niemeyer, Hamelin, 2015. ISBN 978-3-8271-9139-7
- Eberhard Michael Iba: Die Deutsche Märchenstraße. Eine sagenhafte Reise vom Main zum Meer, Hamelin 2011. ISBN 978-3-8271-9136-6
- Eberhard Michael Iba: Auf den Spuren der Brüder Grimm. Teil I: Eine literarische Reise von Hanau nach Höxter ("On the Trail of the Brothers Grimm. Part I: A Literary Journey from Hanau to Höxter"). Strassen (Luxembourg), 2000. ISBN 2-9599793-0-3
- Eberhard Michael Iba: Auf den Spuren der Brüder Grimm von Hanau nach Bremen. Märchen, Sagen, Geschichten ("On the Trail of the Brothers Grimm from Hanau to Bremen. Fairy Tales, Legends, Stories."). . Pustet, Regensburg, 1978. ISBN 3-7917-0536-9
- Michael Pasdzior, Matthias Reinhard: Die Deutsche Märchenstraße. Auf den Spuren der Brüder Grimm ("The German Fairy Tale Route. On the Trail of the Brothers Grimm"). Ellert und Richter, Hamburg, 1996. ISBN 3-89234-681-X
- Dorothee Hemme: Märchenstraßen - Lebenswelten. Zur kulturellen Konstruktion einer touristischen Themenstraße (Fairy Tale Route - Real World. The Cultural Construction of a Themed Tourist Route). Lit, Berlin/Munster, 2009. ISBN 978-3-643-10179-2 (Secondary school paper: Zugel. Dissertation, University of Göttingen, 2007)
