= Schöneberg (Hofgeismar) =

- Stadtteil of Hofgeismar
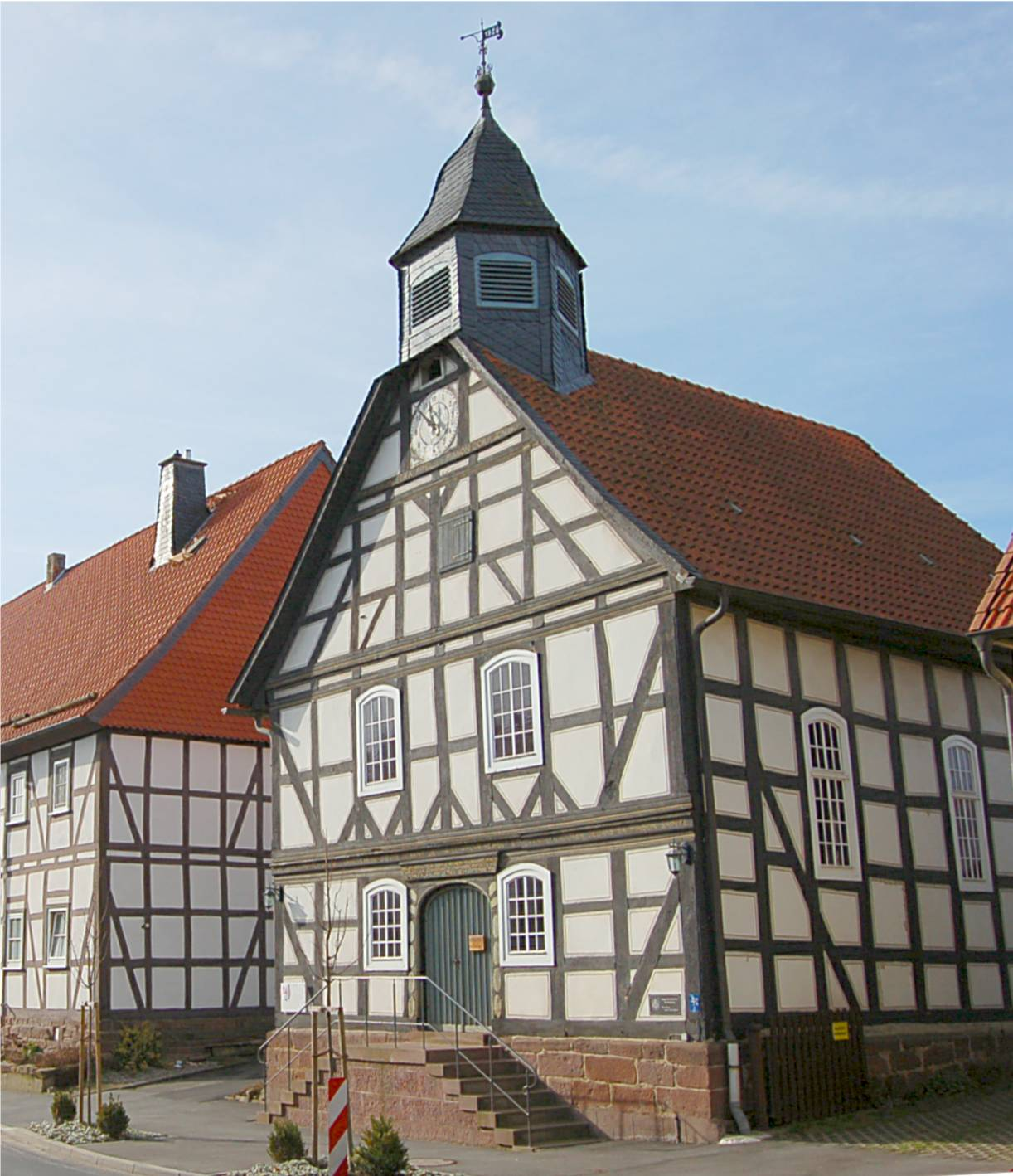
- The church in Schöneberg, built in 1705
- Interactive map of Schöneberg
- Location within Germany Location within Hesse
- Coordinates: 51°31′26″N 9°23′55″E
- Country: Germany
- State: Hesse
- District: Kassel
- Town: Hofgeismar
- Founded: 1699

Population
  - Total: 600
- Time zone: UTC+01:00 (CET)
  - Summer (DST): UTC+02:00 (CEST)

Schöneberg (German: [ˈʃøːnəbɛʁk]) is a village and a municipal division (Stadtteil) of the town of Hofgeismar in the district of Kassel in northern Hesse, Germany. West of the village, there are the ruins of a castle dating from the 12th century that bears the same name.

== Geography ==
Schöneberg is a straßendorf, a village that straddles a main road. Schöneberg lies on the western edge of the Reinhardswald and is home to 600 residents. The German Bundesstraße 83 between Kassel and Bremen runs through town.

== History ==
=== Castle ===
To exert their power and influence, and for protection, in the early part of the 12th century, the archbishops of Mainz in the Diemel and upper Weser area built a fortress on top of a mountain 323 meters (1,060 ft) high, just west of where the village stands today. Today, the castle stands in ruins.

=== Lords of Schöneberg ===
The lords of Schöneberg appeared in the High Middle Ages in northern Hesse and bore the title nobilis Dominus. Their domain stretched through scattered seats from Schöneberg to the Reinhardswald. The castle was built by Count Hermann II of Winzenburg.

In the 12th century, the archbishopric of Mainz hired them to guard and defend Schöneberg castle. After the death of Hermann II, margrave of Meissen, they were given fiefdom rights as well and the castle became their family seat. The counts of Dassel held Schöneberg as a fiefdom from circa 1220 to 1273.

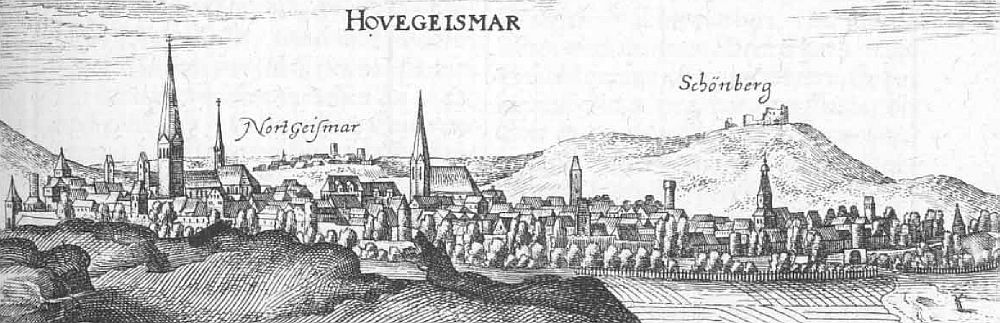
Hofgeismar and Schöneberg in 1655

In the 13th century, the counts tried to extend their territory. As a part of their strategy, they founded villages in the Reinhardswald, between the Diemel river and the Solling. At the same time, conflicts emerged with the archbishops of Mainz and prince-bishops of Paderborn, as well as with the landgraves of Hesse. At the urging of the people of Hofgeismar, Ludolf VI sold Schöneberg castle to the archbishopric of Mainz in 1272 and with it, the jurisdiction over numerous localities, which were later abandoned. The sale ended the reign of the counts of Dassel over the Reinhardswald, which they had had for decades. This caused a dispute between Ludolf VI and his brother, Adolf V, who was firmly against the sale and refused to approve it. The deed of sale was prepared in 1273 and Ludolf VI put it in writing that he would continue to fight him, if he did not relent.

The lords then moved to Trendelburg castle. A lack of heirs caused them to disappear in the beginning of the 15th century.

=== Village ===
The village of Schöneberg was founded in 1699 by French Huguenots. Charles I, Landgrave of Hesse-Kassel gave them land around Hofgeismar to build new settlements after they had been expelled from France by the Edict of Fontainebleau in 1685. Likewise, were Waldensians also welcomed to settle in the region after they were expelled in 1698 by Louis XIV.

David Clément

The village of Schöneberg came into being after Charles I picked a site for a new colony to be built on the land of a former village, which was first mentioned in historical documents in 965. Building began in 1700. Paul du Ry, also a Huguenot and refugee, was responsible for planning. In 1685, Charles I appointed him court architect.

The half-timbered church was built from 1705-06. David Clément was the pastor until his death. Clément dies on January 29, 1725 in Hofgeismar. From 1686, Clément had been pastor of the French Reformed Church congregation at the Neustädter church in Hofgeismar.

There were 24 founding families in Schöneberg. Because of the high mortality rate of children at that time, their numbers did not show significant increase until the 1779 census, when a total of 124 people in 28 families were counted.

The main income of the village was from farming, but over the course of time, other trades and businesses were established, including a brickworks, a few potteries, two tailors, two shoemakers, a hosier and a soap maker.

In 1730, the route of the Bremen post road was moved from passing through a neighboring village to passing through Schöneberg, apparently to improve travel to new baths at Hofgeismar. This change may have altered the development of the village. By the time of the 1779 census, there were already 12 German families living in Schöneberg, as well as 16 French households. The special status accorded to villages founded by French religious refugees was abolished by a landgrave regulation in 1822.

== Sources ==
- Albert Fraustadt, Geschichte des Geschlechtes von Schönberg Meissnischen Stammes, Vol. 1 Google Books. Verlag von Giesecke & Devrient, Leipzig (1869) beginning p. 566 (in German)
- Kreis Hofgeismar, Handbuch des Heimatbundes für Kurhessen, Waldeck und Oberhessen III, Marburg/Lahn (1966) p. 192 (in German)
- Rudolf Knappe, Mittelalterliche Burgen in Hessen, Gudensberg-Gleichen (1995) (in German)
- Jochen Desel, Französische Dörfer - deutsche Zuwanderer 1669-1779: 300 Jahre Kelze und Schöneberg, Band II, Hofgeismar (1999) (in German)
