= Immenhausen =

- Town
- Coat of arms

- Location of Immenhausen within Kassel district
- Interactive map of Immenhausen
- Location within Germany Location within Hesse
- Coordinates: 51°25′N 09°30′E
- Country: Germany
- State: Hesse
- Admin. region: Kassel
- District: Kassel

Government
  - Mayor (2021–27): Lars Obermann (SPD)

Area
  - Total: 28.54 km^{2} (11.02 sq mi)
- Elevation: 339 m (1,112 ft)

Population (2025-12-31)
  - Total: 7,053
  - Density: 247.1/km^{2} (640.1/sq mi)
- Time zone: UTC+01:00 (CET)
  - Summer (DST): UTC+02:00 (CEST)
- Postal codes: 34376
- Dialling codes: 05673
- Vehicle registration: KS
- Website: www.immenhausen.de

Immenhausen (German: [ɪmənˈhaʊzn̩]) is a town in the district of Kassel, in Hesse, Germany. It is located 12 km north of Kassel on the German Timber-Frame Road. The town has 7,098 inhabitants as of July 2020, including the northern village of Mariendorf and eastern village of Holzhausen.

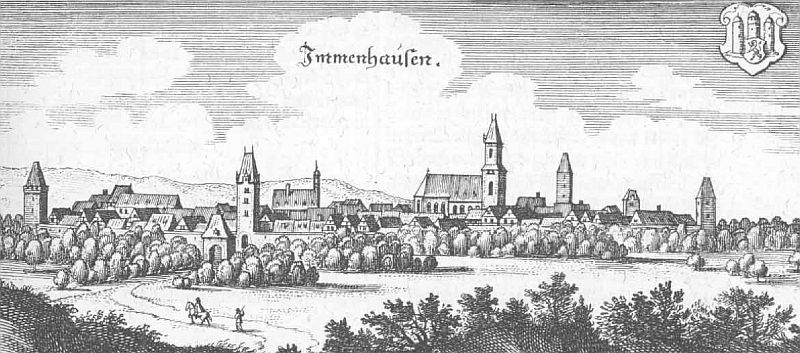
Copper engraving of Immenhausen, Matthäus Merian, 1646.

== Geography ==
The Holzkape, a tributary of the Esse (Diemel) river, flows through Immenhausen. The Osterbach, a tributary of the Fulda, flows through the village Holzhausen.

Immenhausen is bordered by the villages of Grebenstein to the north and west, Espenau to the south, Fuldatal to the southeast, and the unincorporated Reinhardswald area to the east.

== History ==
While evidence of human activity dating back to 5000 BCE has been found in the area around Immenhausen, it was first mentioned by name in 1123, named after Dudo von Immenhausen, the governor of the Rusteburg castle in Eichsfeld, Thuringia. Much of the town was destroyed by fire as part of a war in 1385, and was rebuilt only slowly. Remnants of Immenhausen's original protective wall (Stadtmauer), which encircled the entire town in the thirteenth century, can still be seen today.

In 1522, Bartholomaeus Rieseberg, a student of reformist Martin Luther, gave his first evangelical sermon in Immenhausen's St. George church. A bronze statue of him stands in front of the church. In 1958, the second volume of a two-volume Gutenberg Bible from Rieseberg was discovered in the attic of the parish house in good condition. It was given to the University of Kassel library.

Immenhausen suffered extensive fire damage during the Thirty Years' War, being burnt down four times between 1618 and 1648.

In 1662, the town hall (Rathaus) was rebuilt in a timber frame style, and is still standing today.

In 1987, the Glasmuseum, detailing historical glassmaking practices of the region, was opened in a repurposed generator building.

== Transportation ==
Immenhausen has a stop on the Kassel–Warburg railway. It is connected by the RegioTram 1 (RT1), to Kassel Hauptbahnhof. There are also a number of buses in Immenhausen that run to the villages Mariendorf and Holzhausen as well as to Grebenstein and Espenau. Immenhausen is about 9 km east of Kassel Airport.

== Notable people ==
Albertus Pictor (1440-1509), Painter.

Georg Wilhelm Hartmann (1844-1909), Chairman of the German Socialist Worker's Party (German: Sozialistische Arbeiterpartei Deutschlands), predecessor of the Social Democratic Party of Germany.

Julius Maus (1906-1934), German cyclist.

Ludwig Hobein (1911-1997), Schutzpolizei director from 1945 to 1957.

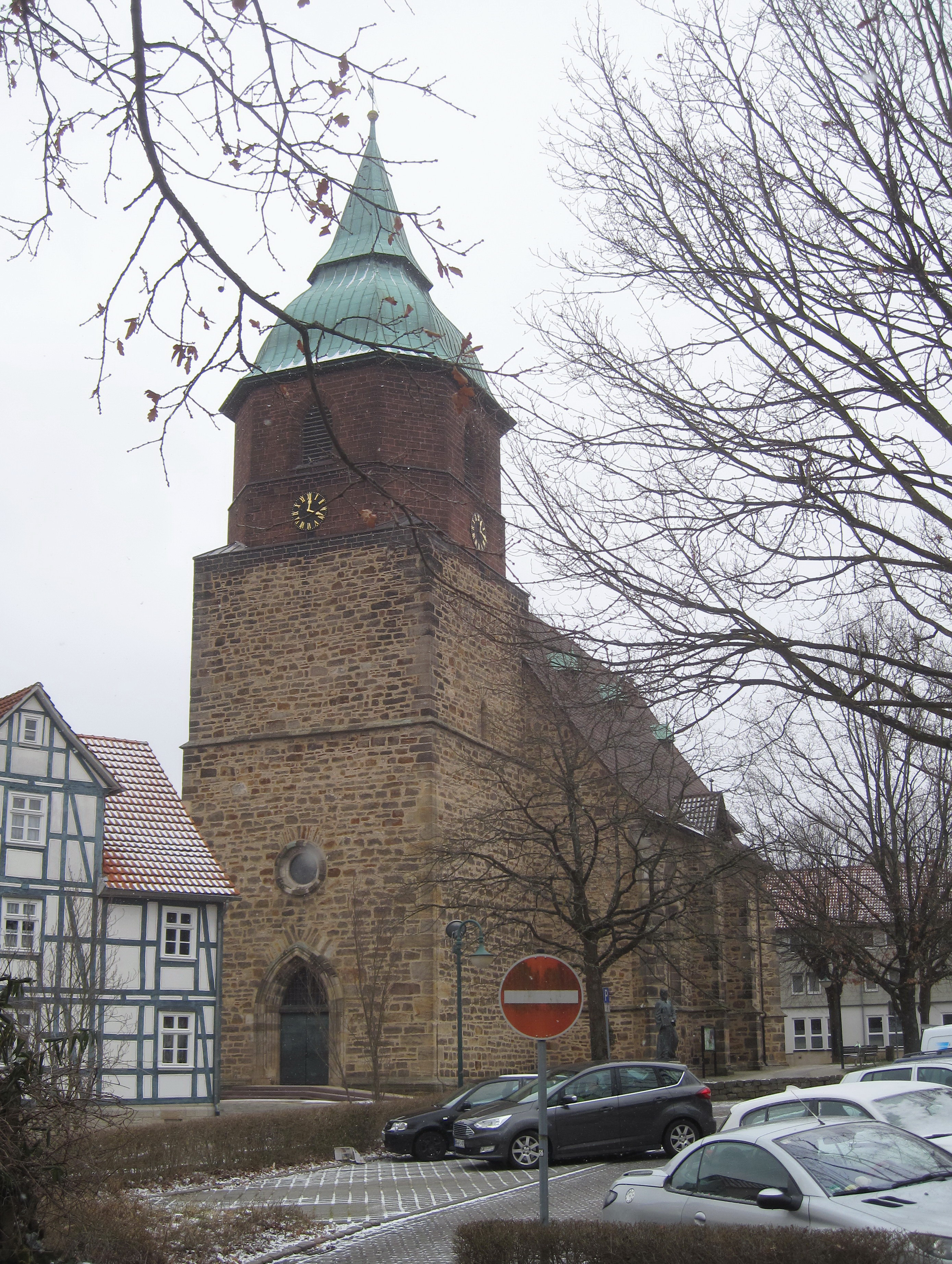
St. George church in the city center, built in 1409.

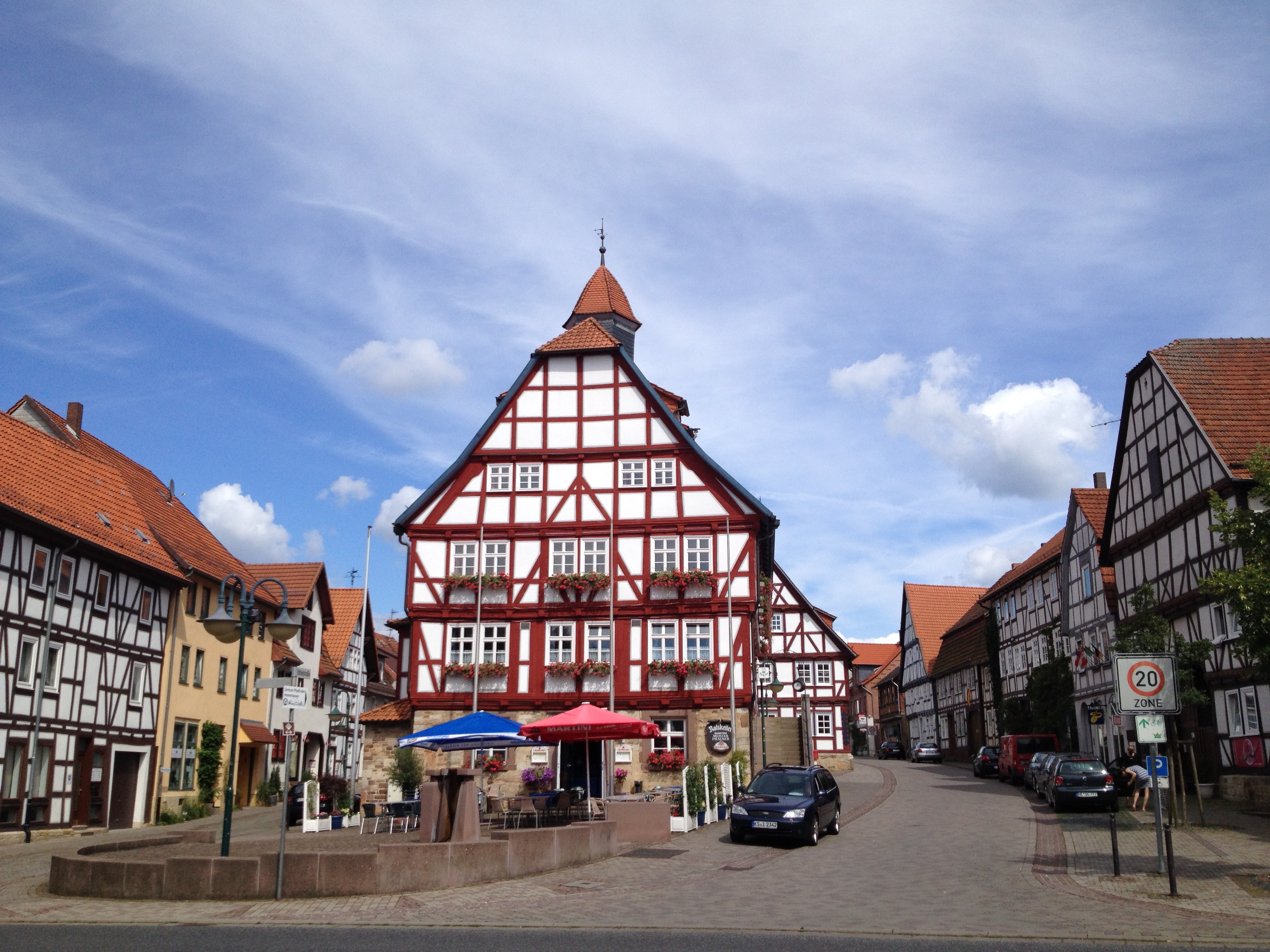
The city hall (Rathaus), rebuilt in 1662.
