= Sababurg =

Sababurg (Sleeping Beauty Castle)
- Zappenburg, Zapfenburg, Dornröschenschloss
- Sababurg, town of Hofgeismar
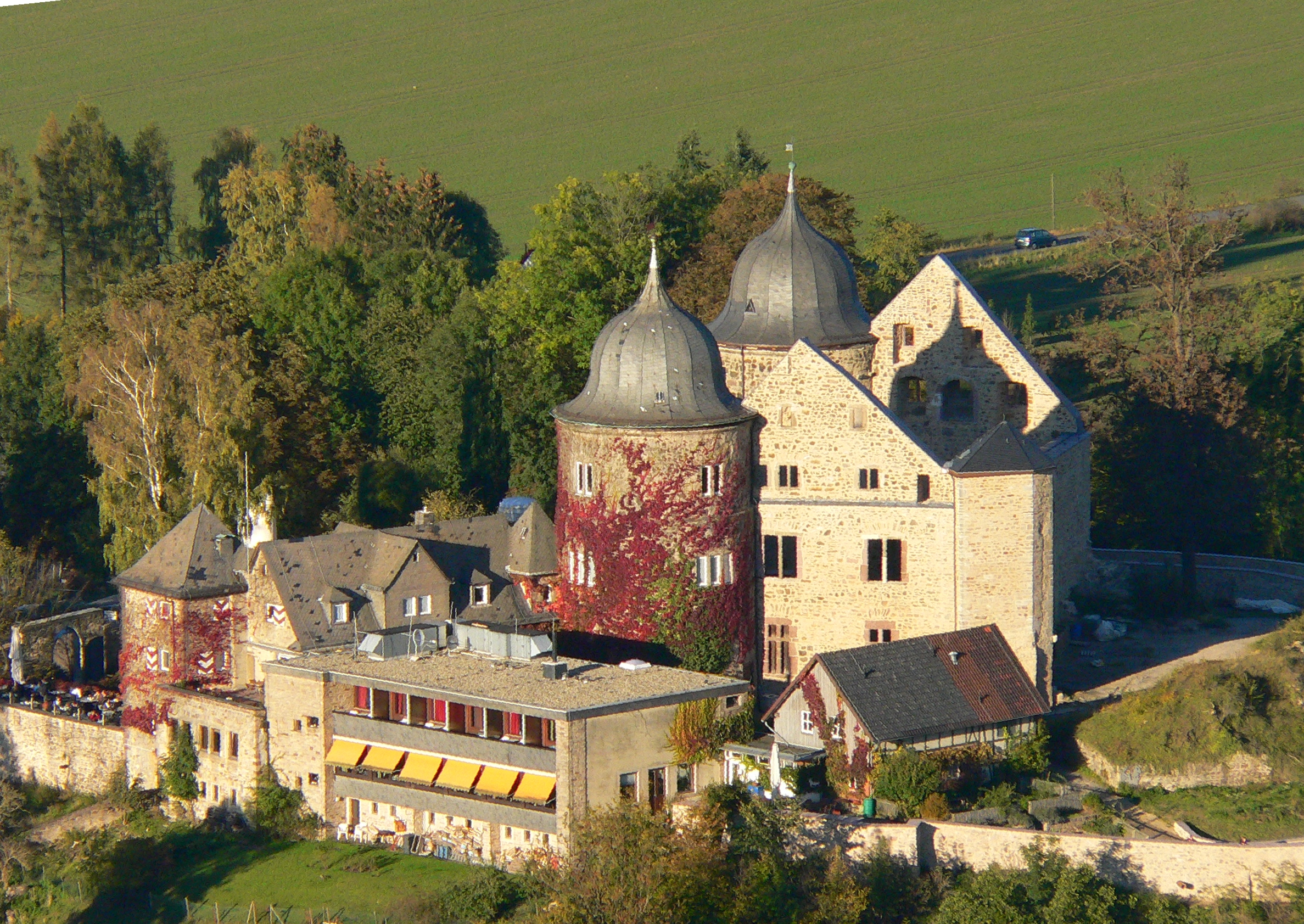
- Sababurg and the Reinhardswald from the southwest

Site information
- Type: hill castle
- Code: DE-HE
- Condition: preserved or largely preserved

Location
- Location within Hesse Location within Germany
- Coordinates: 51°32′37″N 9°32′15″E
- Height: 315 m above sea level (NHN)

Site history
- Built: from 1334

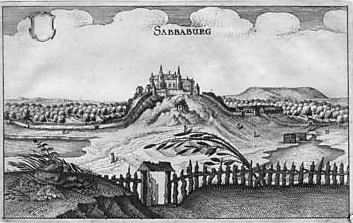
Sababurg, copperplate by Matthäus Merian from the Topographia Hassiae 1645

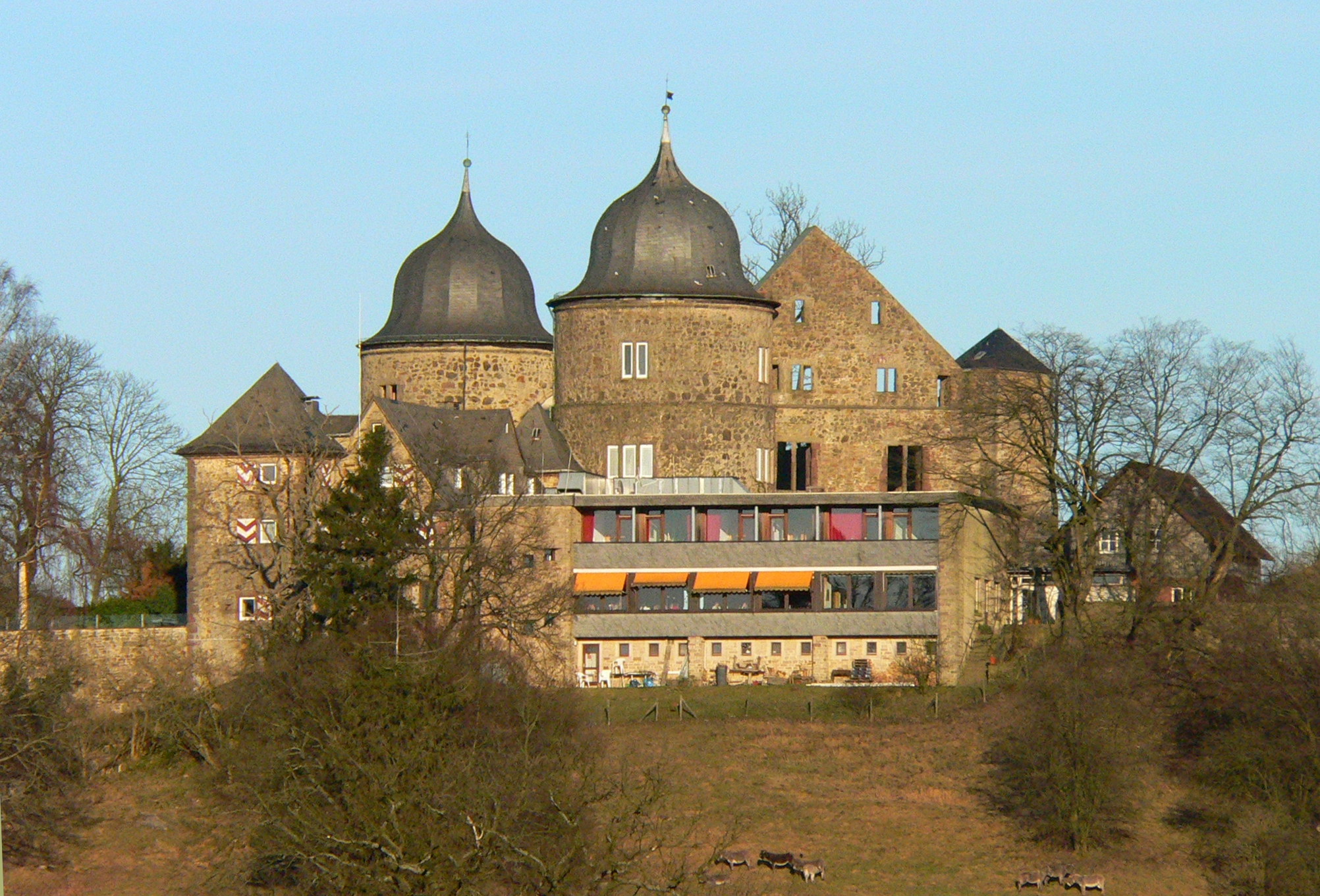
Sababurg, view from the west

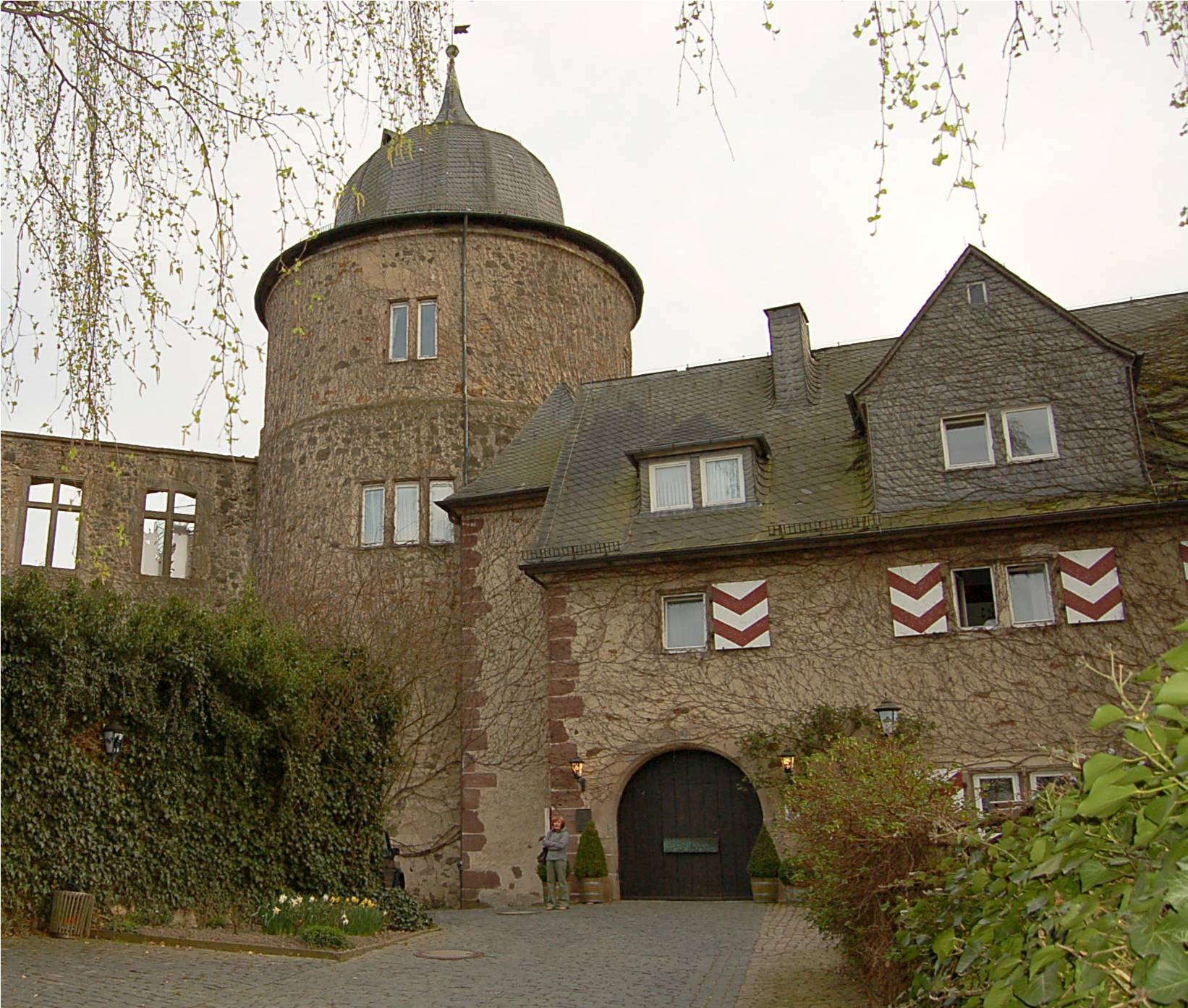
Entrance to the Sababurg

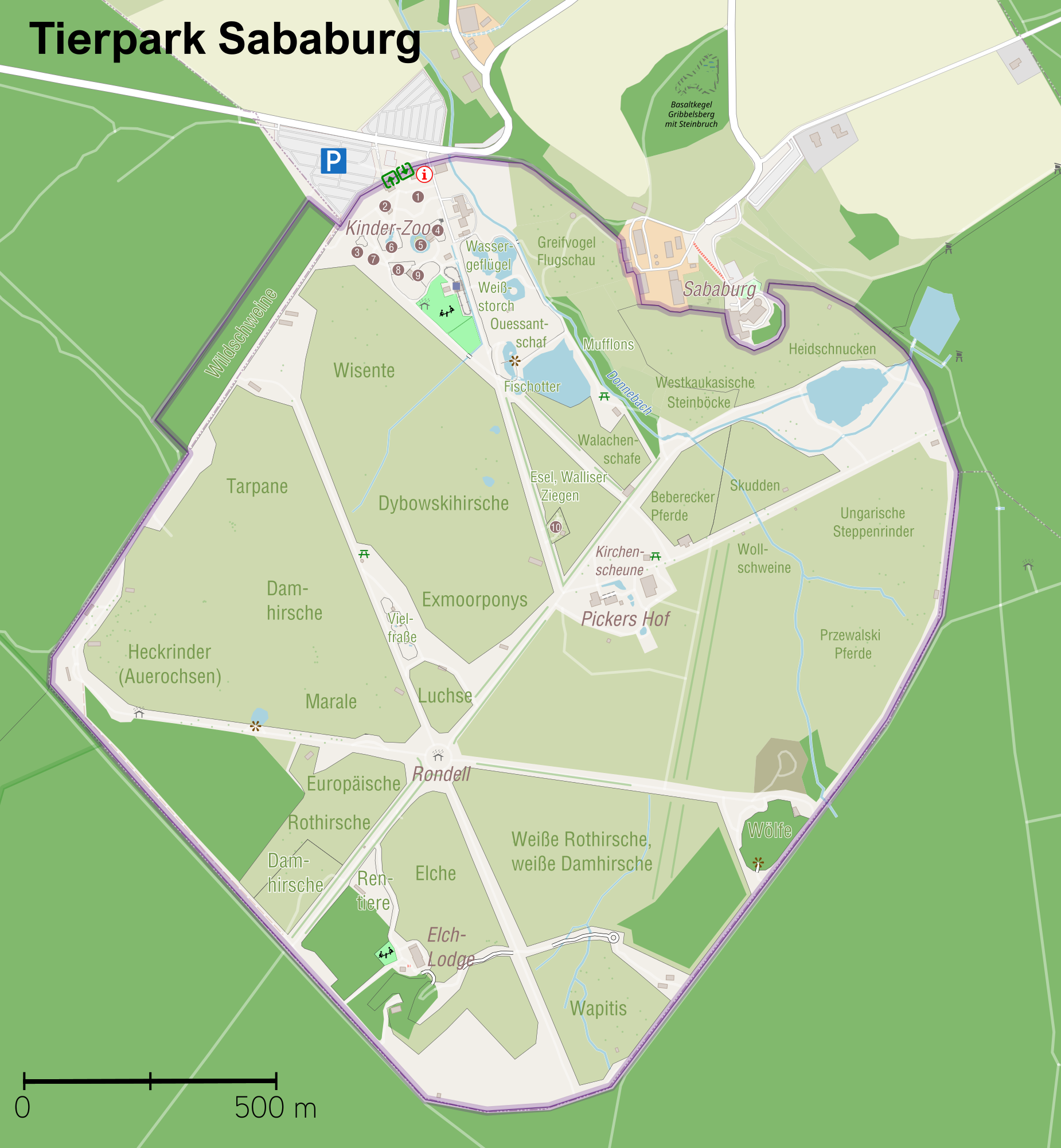
Location of the Sababurg on the map of the Sababurg Wildlife Park

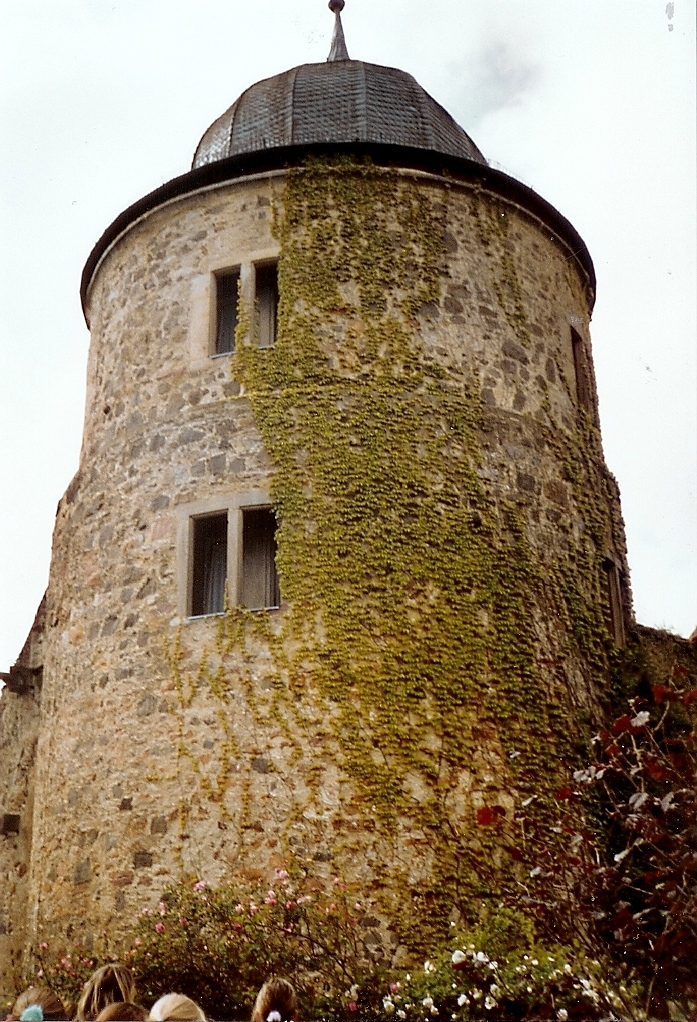
A corner tower of the Sababurg

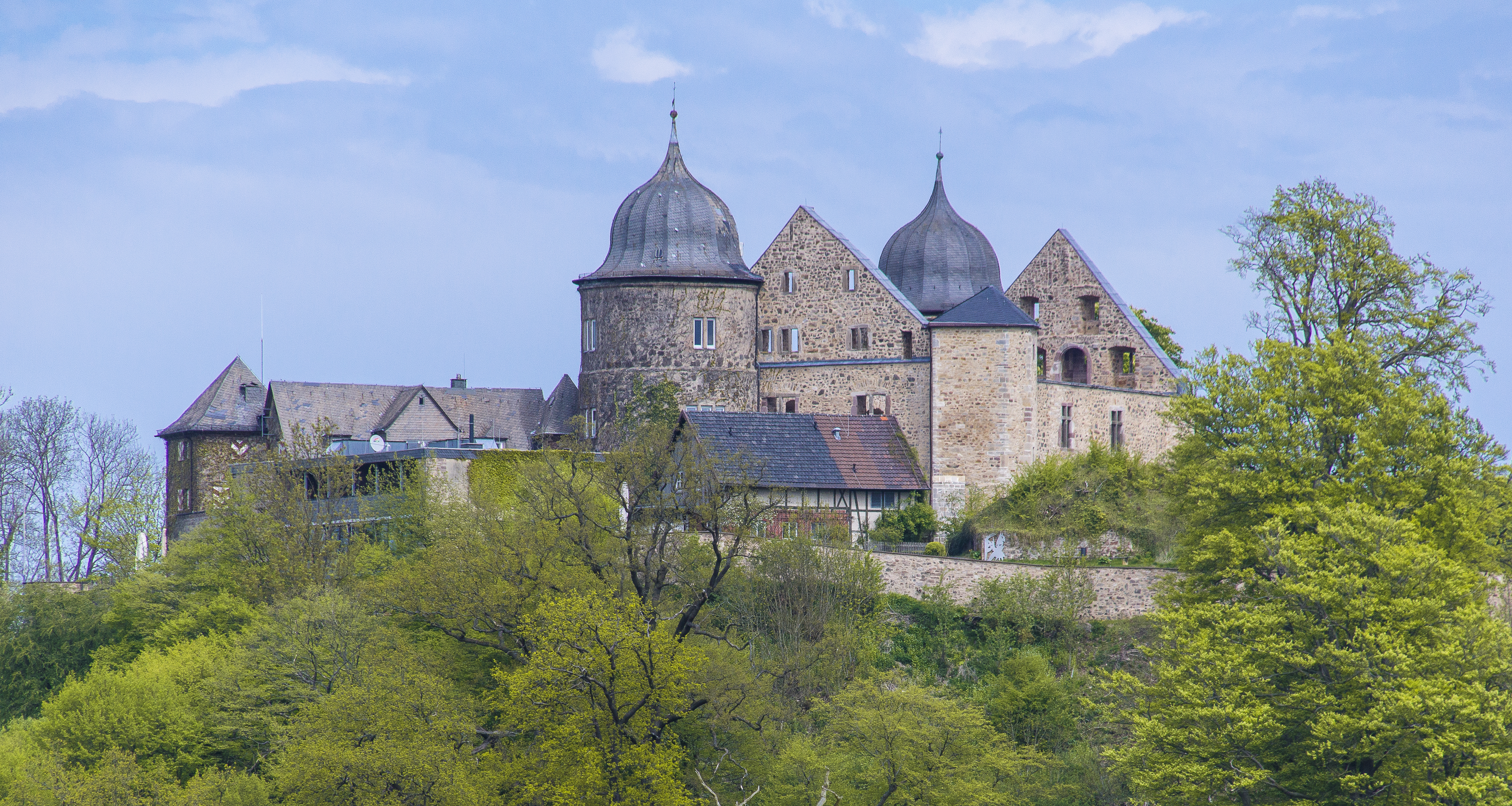
Sababurg

The Sababurg, first called the Zappenburg, then Zapfenburg and today, after the Brothers Grimm fairy tale Sleeping Beauty Castle (German: Dornröschenschloss), is the ruin of a hill castle in the legendary Reinhardswald, a forested upland that runs through the North Hessian county of Kassel. Sababurg is also the name of a district of the town of Hofgeismar in which the castle is found.

The hill castle appears in 1334 as the Zappenburg to protect pilgrims to the nearby pilgrimage site of Gottsbüren. In 1490, the hunting lodge of Zapfenburg grew out of the medieval castle site. After 1957 the site was restored and since 1959 it has housed an hotel. Together with the Trendelburg and Krukenburg the present ruins belong to the three best known castles in the Reinhardswald region, although the latter is just outside this forest. In the surrounding area is the Sababurg Wildlife Park and the virgin forest of Urwald Sababurg. The concept for the board game Enchanted Forest was developed from the castle.

== Location ==
The Sababurg stands in the heart of the Reinhardswald in the village of Sababurg in the east-northeast of the Hofgeismar borough of Beberbeck (an estate settlement with a castle). It is located between Beberbeck, about 4.5 km west-southwest of the ruins, and Gottsbüren (village east of Trendelburg), around 4.5 km north-northwest (each as the crow flies). The ruins stand on a relatively open basalt kuppe at an elevation of about 315 m above sea level (NHN). Southwest and below the castle is the Sababurg Wildlife Park, through which the little stream of Donnebach, an eastern and right-hand tributary of the Holzape, runs in a northwesterly direction. The ruins, village and wildlife park are an exclave of Hofgeismar, surrounded by the unparished area of Gutsbezirk Reinhardswald, in which the Urwald Sababurg lies on the other side of the park.

== History ==
=== Zappenburg ===
Construction on the Zappenburg (formerly: Zappaborgck and Zappenborgck) began on 19 April 1334 to protect and guard pilgrims to the nearby pilgrimage site of Gottsbüren, "where in 1330 the uncorrupted body of Jesus is supposed to have been found". It was founded by the Bishopric of Mainz, which was in constant competition with the Landgraviate of Hesse, the Bishopric of Paderborn and the Duchy of Brunswick, whose territories virtually bordered on one another here. The construction was probably funded by income from the pilgrimages. With the completion of the work in 1336 Arnold of Portenhagen became the first castellan or Burgmann.

In 1346 there was a conflict in which Mainz was defeated. The castle was divided between the Landgraviate of Hesse and the Bishopric of Paderborn and, in 1455, described as "abandoned". The castle went entirely into the possession of Hesse in 1462 after the end of the Mainz Diocesan Feud.

=== Zapfenburg and Sababurg ===
In 1490 Landgrave William I (1466–1515) "built a fine hunting lodge on the foundation walls of the original site, which was to be a venue for innumerable prestigious festivals and gatherings for 300 years". After this rebuilding or remodelling there was a significant requirement for drinking water for people and animals. This was the catalyst for the construction of a water pipe. In 1508 construction began on the palas, which was finished under his nephew Philip I (1504–1567) in 1519. A stud farm was also laid out.

=== Today ===
The site of the Sababurg has been gradually restored by the state of Hesse since 1957 and opened to the public. From 1959 the ruins were converted into a high-class hotel with restaurant and café that was opened in 1960. In addition it houses a theatre, the SabaBurgTheater. In 1987 the first municipal wedding venue in Germany located outside of a town hall was established at the Sababurg. In 2002 a second, larger wedding room was opened.

Of the original defences of the Sababurg, restoration work has uncovered parts of the enceinte with its flanking gate and ditche and bank works. Only the outer walls of the palas have survived. In addition to the two mighty corner towers with their welschen Hauben, which are used by the hotel, a small staircase tower has also survived. The chancellery building was expanded in 1976 by a modern extension.

=== General renovation and new construction ===
The Sababurg has been open to visitors to a limited extent since 2018 due to extensive renovation work. Only the outside areas of the castle can be visited on weekends and public holidays. The hotel and catering operations were also discontinued in 2018 and civil weddings do not take place anymore.

The first dismantling work on the Sababurg began in 2020. After the demolition of the old hotel, the new hotel with a restaurant and conference rooms for 200 people will be built into the historical ruin complex. The new building is intended to take up the horizontal, dominant building edges of the Palais, the sloping roof surfaces and the characteristic diversity of the castle. The new four-star hotel will have 40 rooms spread across the towers, the modernized office building and the ground floor and upper floor of the new building. The hotelcatering is located in the basement and has a terrace facing the Sababurg Wildlife Park. The construction costs were initially estimated at twelve million euros. The renovation and new construction began in 2023 and will take around three years. After Revision of the plans, the new hotel building will consist largely of wood, which will lead to an increase in costs to 43 million euros.

== Literature ==
- Landesamt für Denkmalpflege Hessen (publ.): Denkmaltopographie Bundesrepublik Deutschland. Baudenkmale in Hessen – Kreis Kassel, Teil I. Brunswick, 1988, ISBN 3-528-06239-8
- Eduard Brauns, The Sababurg and der Reinhardswald Geschichte and Gegenwart, 4th edition, 1991
- Rudolf Knappe: Mittelalterliche Burgen in Hessen: 800 Burgen, Burgruinen and Burgstätten. 3rd edition, Wartberg-Verlag, Gudensberg-Gleichen, 2000. ISBN 3-86134-228-6, pp. 18f.
- Hermann-Josef Rapp (ed.): Reinhardswald. Eine Kulturgeschichte. Euregio, Kassel, 2002, ISBN 3-933617-12-X
- Schlösser, Burgen, alte Mauern. Herausgegeben vom Hessendienst der Staatskanzlei, Wiesbaden, 1990, pp. 185f., ISBN 3-89214-017-0
