= Staufenberg (Reinhardswald) =

Mountain in Germany

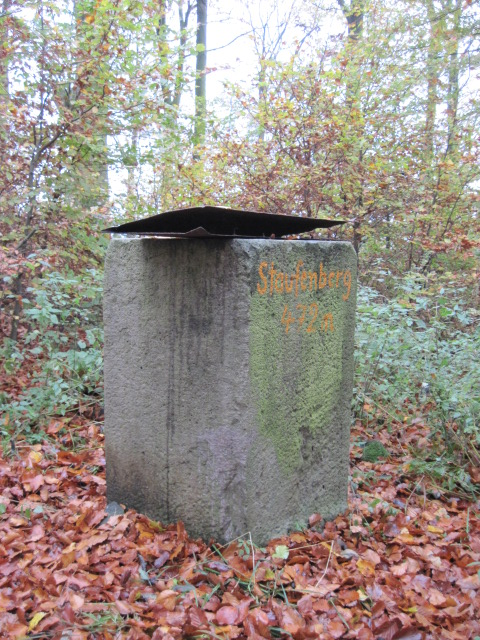

Highest point
- Elevation: 472.2 m above sea level (NN) (1,549 ft)
- Coordinates: 51°18′11″N 9°20′03″E

Geography
- Location within Hesse
- Location: Kassel, Hesse, Germany
- Parent range: Reinhardswald

The Staufenberg (German pronunciation: [ˈʃtaʊfn̩ˌbɛʁk]) is a mountain in the Reinhardswald in Kassel, Hesse, Germany. The Reinhardswald itself spans about 184 square kilometers as an unincorporated municipal forest district (Gutsbezirk) in the Weser-Leine Bergland, managed primarily for forestry and featuring dense woodlands of beech, oak, and spruce without permanent settlements.
