= Espenau =

- Municipality
- Coat of arms

- Location of Espenau within Kassel district
- Interactive map of Espenau
- Location within Germany Location within Hesse
- Coordinates: 51°23′35″N 9°27′32″E
- Country: Germany
- State: Hesse
- Admin. region: Kassel
- District: Kassel

Government
  - Mayor (2020–26): Carsten Strzoda

Area
  - Total: 13.59 km^{2} (5.25 sq mi)
- Elevation: 266 m (873 ft)

Population (2025-12-31)
  - Total: 5,053
  - Density: 371.8/km^{2} (963.0/sq mi)
- Time zone: UTC+01:00 (CET)
  - Summer (DST): UTC+02:00 (CEST)
- Postal codes: 34314
- Dialling codes: 05673
- Vehicle registration: KS
- Website: www.espenau.de

Espenau is a municipality in the district of Kassel, in Hesse, Germany. It is composed of two districts the Espenau-Hohenkirchen, and the Espenau-Mönchehof both are situated 9 kilometers north of Kassel. As of December 2019, Espenau has 5,158 inhabitants. It covers a total area of 13.59 km^{2}.

== Geography ==
Espenau is bordered by the municipalities of Immenhausen to the north, Fuldatal to the east, Vellmar to the south, and Calden and Grebenstein to the west.

A pond at the northern edge of Hohenkirchen is the source of the Esse river. The Espe river, a tributary of the Fulda, starts in the western portion of Espenau and flows through the town, and gives the town its name.

Espenau is about 6 kilometers from the rococo style Wilhelmsthal Castle.

== History ==
Hohenkirchen's earliest mention is in a certificate dating back to 1285. In 1216, the Hardehausen Monastery built a farm in the area of Mönchehof, likely given its name in 1500 because of the two monks that operated the farm. As part of a larger series of local government reorganization in Hesse, the villages of Hohenkirchen and Mönchehof were combined into the same municipality of Espenau in October 1970.

== Coat of Arms ==
The coat of arms depicts four aspen tree leaves against red and white quadrants, a reference to the town's name of Espenau (German: Espe).

== Transportation ==
Espenau-Mönchehof has a stop on the Kassel–Warburg railway. It is connected by the Kassel RegioTram Line 1 to Kassel Hauptbahnhof. It is also connected via bus to Immenhausen Vellmar, Calden, and the nearby Kassel Airport.

== Notable people ==
Bernd Herrmann (*1951)- West German athlete who primarily competed in the 400 metres.
