= Osterbach (Fulda) =

Small river of Hesse, Germany

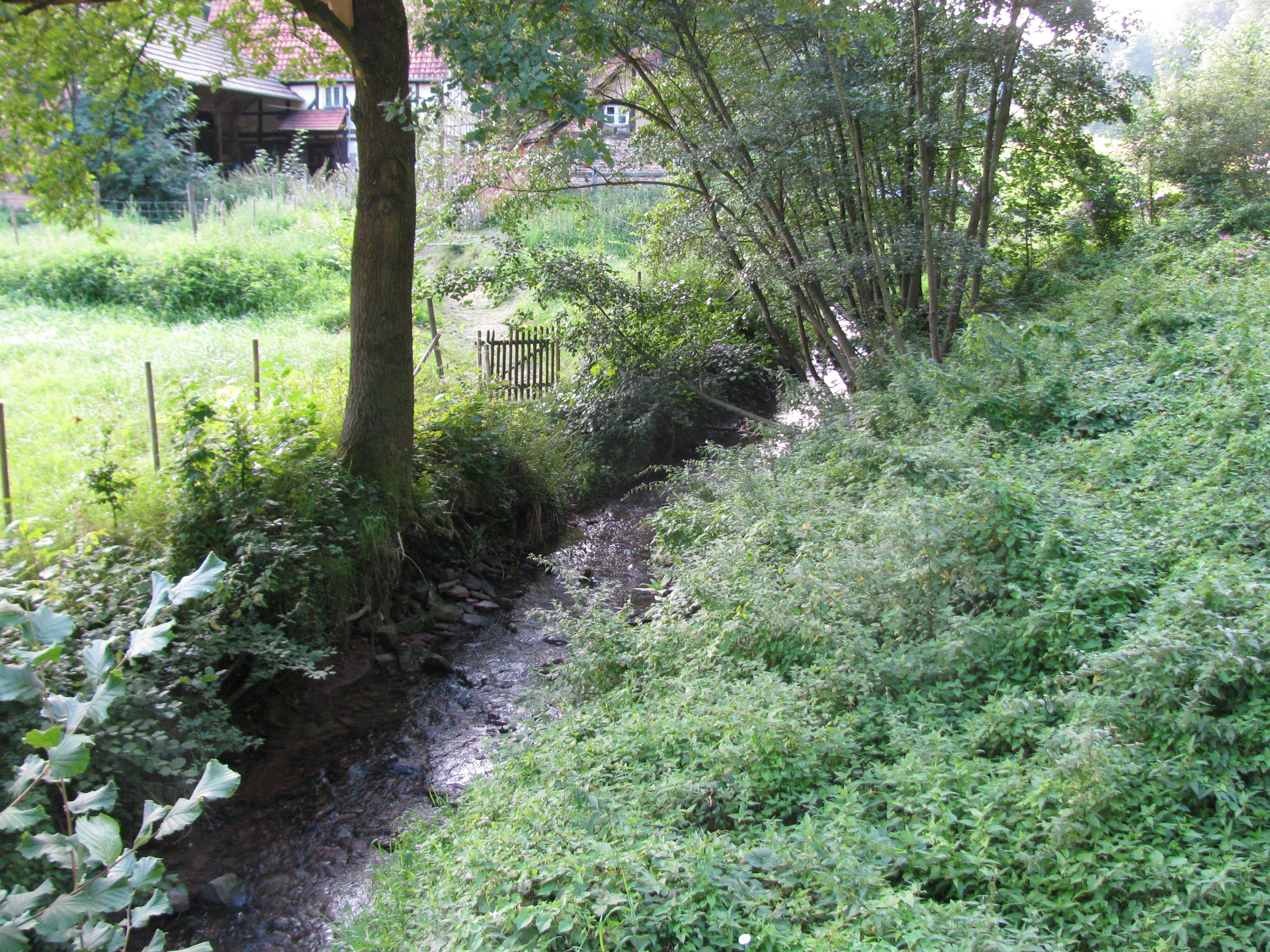
- The Osterbach upstream of the Bridge of the Kreisstraße

Location
- Country: Germany
- States: Hesse

Physical characteristics
- Mouth
  - location: Fulda
  - coordinates: 51.3889°N 9.5648°E

Basin features
- Progression: Fulda→ Weser→ North Sea

Osterbach is a small river in the Kassel district of Hesse, Germany. Originating in the Reinhardswald Forest and measuring 7.2 kilometres (4.5 mi) long, it is the left tributary that flows into the Fulda River at the Lower Saxony border.

The Hessian Ministry for Agriculture and Environment, Viticulture, Forestry, Hunting and Homeland are working to restore the stream's navigability for fish and other small aquatic animals by eliminating man-made obstacles.

== See also ==
- List of rivers of Hesse
