= Jungfernbach (Esse) =

River in Germany

Location
- Country: Germany
- State: Hesse

Physical characteristics
- Source
  - location: near Schloss Wilhelmsthal, Calden
  - coordinates: 51.3938°N 9.4148°E
- Mouth
  - location: Esse
  - coordinates: 51.4214°N 9.4454°E

Basin features
- Progression: Esse→ Diemel→ Weser→ North Sea

Jungfernbach is a small river of Hesse, Germany. It flows into the Esse.

== See also ==
- List of rivers of Hesse
