= Liebenau, Hesse =

Liebenau
- Town
- Coat of arms

- Location of Liebenau within Kassel district
- Interactive map of Liebenau
- Location within Germany Location within Hesse
- Coordinates: 51°29′N 09°17′E
- Country: Germany
- State: Hesse
- Admin. region: Kassel
- District: Kassel

Government
  - Mayor (2020–26): Harald Munser

Area
  - Total: 48.88 km^{2} (18.87 sq mi)
- Elevation: 176 m (577 ft)

Population (2025-12-31)
  - Total: 2,891
  - Density: 59.14/km^{2} (153.2/sq mi)
- Time zone: UTC+01:00 (CET)
  - Summer (DST): UTC+02:00 (CEST)
- Postal codes: 34396
- Dialling codes: 05676
- Vehicle registration: KS, HOG, WOH
- Website: www.stadt-liebenau.de

Liebenau (German pronunciation: [ˈliːbənaʊ]) is a town in the district of Kassel, in Hesse, Germany. It is situated on the river Diemel, 25 km northwest of Kassel.
