= Mönchehof =

- Village
- Interactive map of Mönchehof
- Coordinates: 51°23′16″N 9°27′19″E
- Elevation: 242 m (794 ft)

Mönchehof is part of the municipality of Espenau in Hessen in Germany. Mönchehof belongs to the Kassel district, not far from Vellmar and the city of Kassel. It was the site of a post World War II American sector displaced person camp. Espenau-Mönchehof is a station on the Kassel–Warburg railway, and is connected to Kassel Hauptbahnhof via the Kassel RegioTram 1.
