= Holzkape =

River in Germany

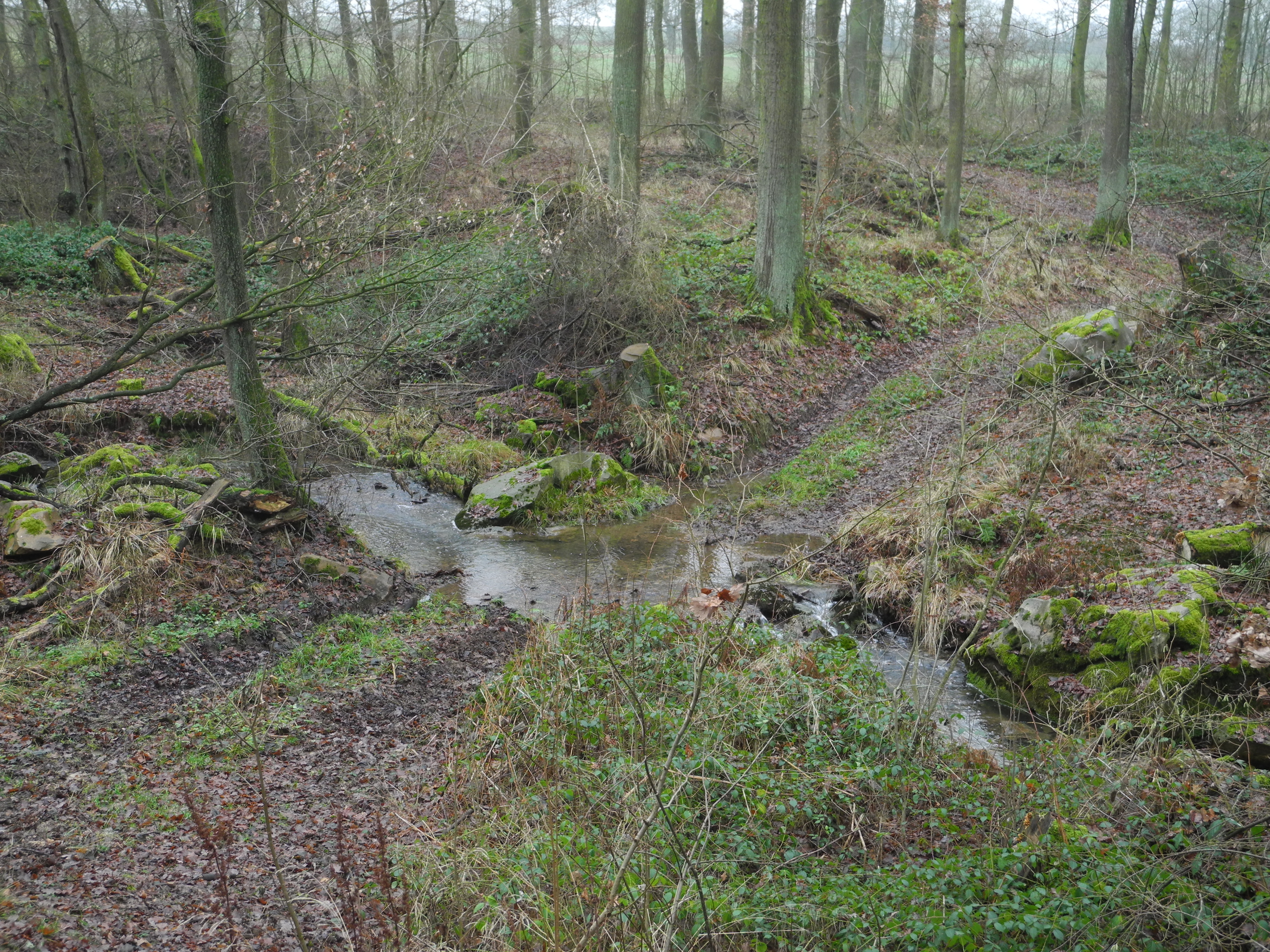

Location
- Country: Germany
- States: Hesse

Physical characteristics
- Mouth
  - location: Esse
  - coordinates: 51.4335°N 9.4350°E

Basin features
- Progression: Esse→ Diemel→ Weser→ North Sea

The Holzkape is a river of Hesse, Germany. It is a 9.1 km long right tributary of the Esse, joining it near Grebenstein.

== See also ==
- List of rivers of Hesse
