= North Hesse =

Region in Hesse, Germany

North Hesse and its counties in the administrative boundaries of Kassel province

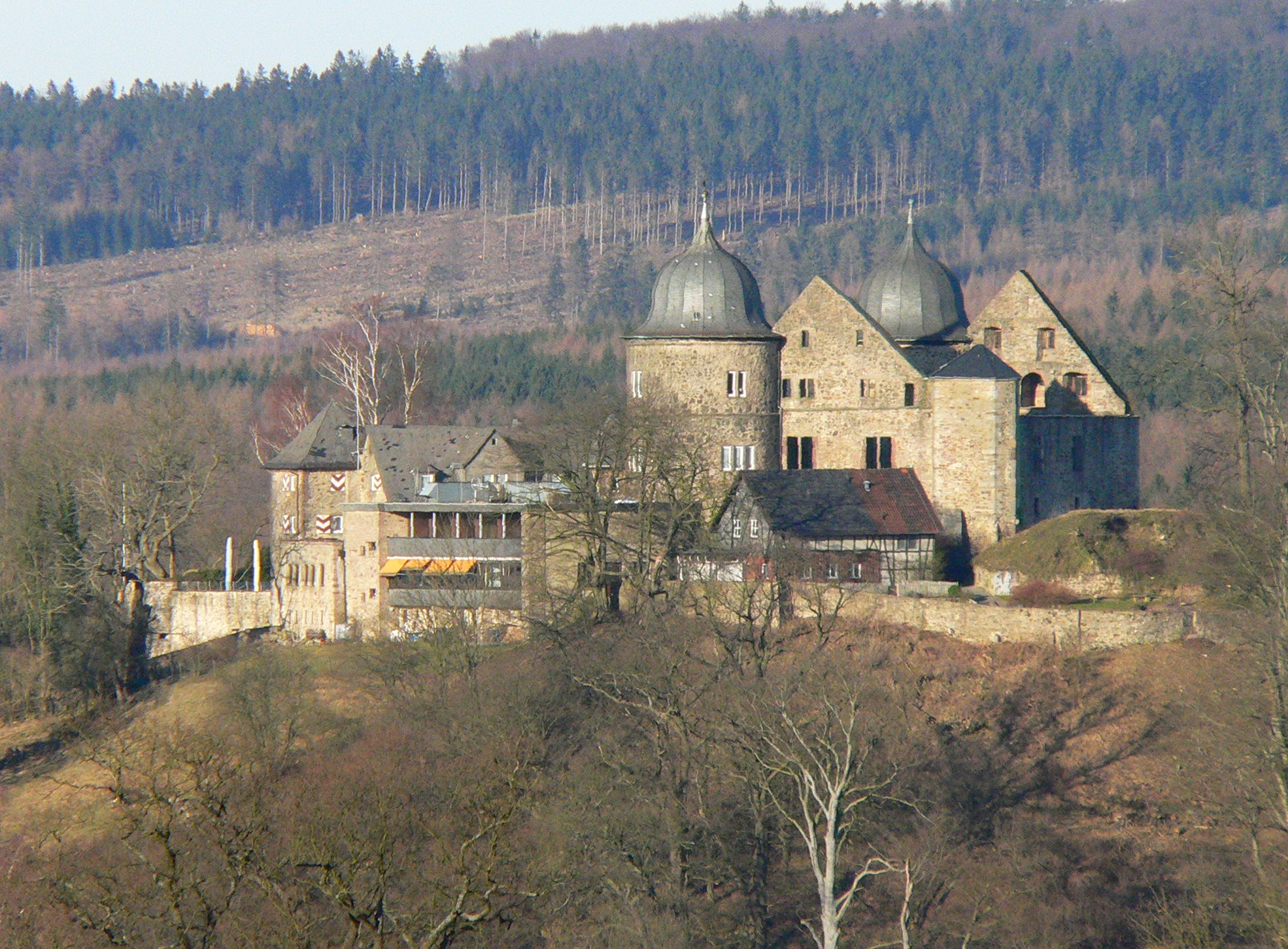
The legendary castle of Sababurg in the Reinhardswald

North Hesse (German: Nordhessen, pronounced [ˈnɔʁtˌhɛsn̩]) describes the northern part and historical heart of the German federated state of Hesse. The region is – unlike the name Lower Hesse – not a historical territory and also has no established, standard and official administrative function. However, the name is common and widely used today, not least to contrast it with its counterpart, South Hesse. Over one million people live in North Hesse and its largest city is the former capital of the Electorate of Hesse, Kassel.
