= Jungfernbach =

Jungfernbach may refer to:

- Jungfernbach (Ahne), a river of Hesse, Germany, tributary of the Ahne
- Jungfernbach (Esse), a river of Hesse, Germany, tributary of the Esse
