= Habichtswald, Hesse =

Habichtswald
- Municipality
- Coat of arms

- Location of Habichtswald within Kassel district
- Interactive map of Habichtswald
- Location within Germany Location within Hesse
- Coordinates: 51°20′34″N 09°20′35″E
- Country: Germany
- State: Hesse
- Admin. region: Kassel
- District: Kassel

Government
  - Mayor (2020–26): Daniel Faßhauer (SPD)

Area
  - Total: 28.21 km^{2} (10.89 sq mi)
- Elevation: 348 m (1,142 ft)

Population (2025-12-31)
  - Total: 5,116
  - Density: 181.4/km^{2} (469.7/sq mi)
- Time zone: UTC+01:00 (CET)
  - Summer (DST): UTC+02:00 (CEST)
- Postal codes: 34317
- Dialling codes: 05606
- Vehicle registration: KS
- Website: www.habichtswald.de

Habichtswald is a municipality in the district of Kassel, in Hesse, Germany. It is located 12 kilometers west of Kassel.
