= Gutsbezirk Reinhardswald =

Unincorporated area in Landkreis Kassel in Hesse, Germany

Coordinates: 51.51578°N 9.54893°E

Location of the Gutsbezirk Reinhardswald in the Kassel district

The Gutsbezirk Reinhardswald (German pronunciation: [ˈɡuːtsbəˌtsɪʁk ˈʁaɪnhaʁtsˌvalt]) is an unincorporated area in the Kassel district in the state of Hesse in Germany. It encompasses an area of 184.16 square kilometres (71.10 sq mi) and is thus the second largest municipality in Hesse by area after the city of Frankfurt. The Gutsbezirk Reinhardswald consists of nearly the whole area of the Reinhardswald. It is administered by the leader of the local forest authority, seated in nearby Reinhardshagen, who is instated by the district and whose duties include taking in taxes, garbage disposal and maintaining the civil registry.

== Curiosities ==
Although the Gutsbezirk Reinhardswald is officially uninhabited, two people inhabit and operate the Tillyschanze restaurant, next to the observation tower of the same name above the city of Hann. Münden, located in Lower Saxony. The border between the states of Hesse and Lower Saxony runs between the restaurant and the observation tower. Until 2015, the territory had no postal code as it was forgotten about when the postal codes were assigned in 1993, and as such no mail was delivered to the inhabitants. The official address, as given by the authorities, was Tillyschanze 1, 00000 Reinhardswald. In December 2015 the Tillyschanze received an address (Bierweg 1, 34346 Hann. Münden, despite not belonging to the community of Münden) and can now receive mail.

Connection to the electricity and water network is provided by the city of Hann. Münden, who also built a road to the restaurant. The inhabitants had to privately contract a company from Lower Saxony to take care of garbage disposal. The two inhabitants have to vote in the nearby electoral district of Reinhardshagen, ten kilometers away from the restaurant.
