= Ahlberg =

Ahlberg or Åhlberg is a surname. Notable people with the surname include:

- Alf Ahlberg (1892–1979), Swedish writer, humanist and philosopher
- Allan Ahlberg (1938–2025), British children's book writer, working together with his wife Janet
- Bruno Ahlberg (1911–1966), Finnish boxer
- Flemming Ahlberg (born 1946), Danish footballer
- Gillis Ahlberg (1892–1930), Swedish rower
- Hakon Ahlberg (1891–1984), Swedish architect, editor and author
- Janet Ahlberg (1944–1994), British children's book illustrator, working together with her husband Allan
- Jessica Ahlberg (born 1979 or 1980), British children's book illustrator and writer, sometimes in collaboration with her father
- Mac Ahlberg (1931–2012), Swedish film director and cinematographer
- Mats Åhlberg (born 1947), Swedish ice hockey player
- Nellie Ahlberg (died 1976), American politician
- Per E. Ahlberg, Swedish vertebrate palaentologist
