= Gahrenberg =

Hill in Hesse, Germany

Coordinates: 51°26′36″N 9°34′17″E

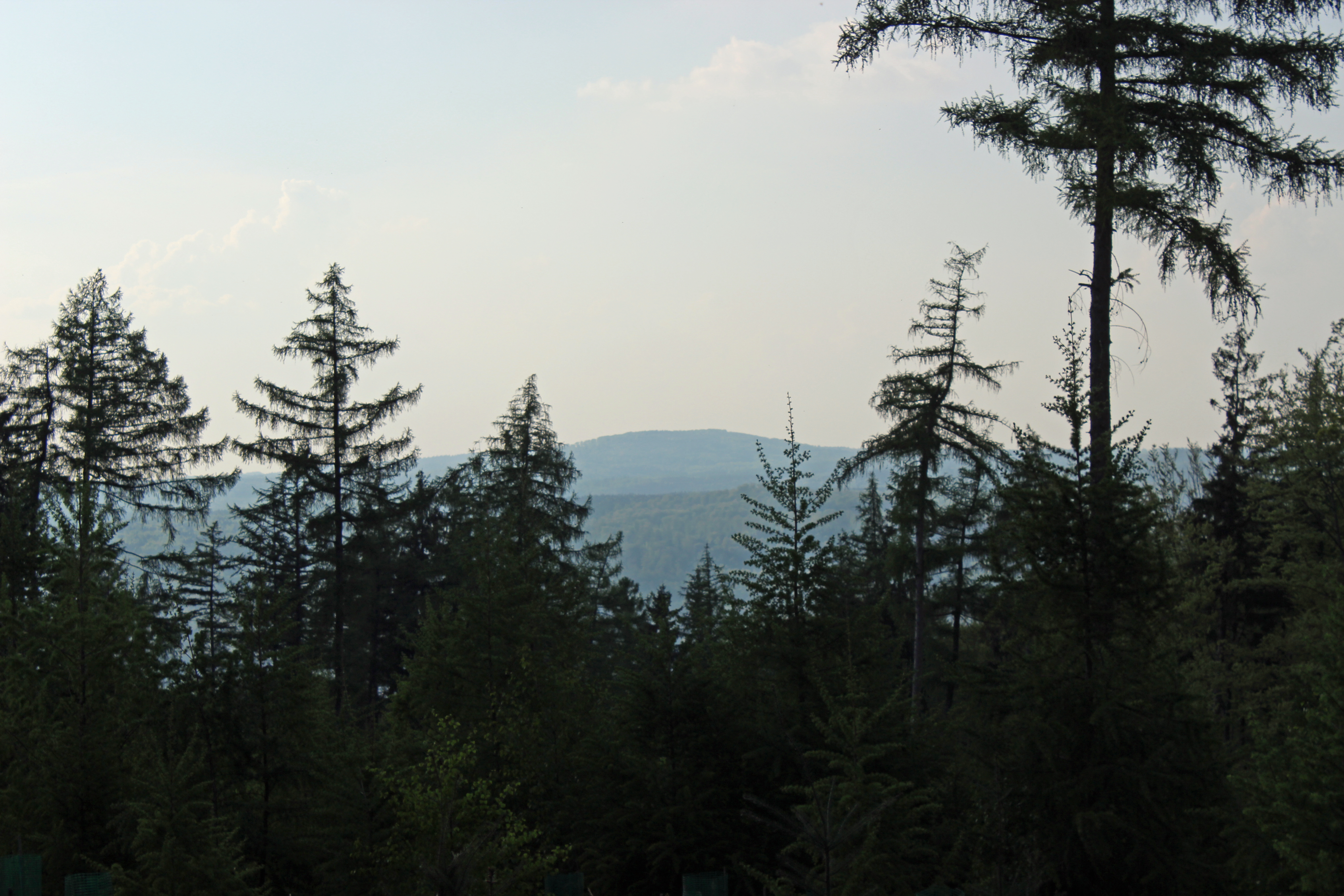
- Gahrenberg, seen from 9 kilometres (5.6 mi) in Kaufunger Wald near Hann. Münden

Highest point
- Elevation: 472.1 m (1,549 ft)

Geography
- Location: Hesse, Germany

The Gahrenberg is a hill in Hesse, Germany.
