= Nieste (municipality) =

- Municipality
- Coat of arms

- Location of Nieste within Kassel district
- Interactive map of Nieste
- Location within Germany Location within Hesse
- Coordinates: 51°19′N 09°40′E
- Country: Germany
- State: Hesse
- Admin. region: Kassel
- District: Kassel

Government
  - Mayor (2021–27): Klaus Missing

Area
  - Total: 4.06 km^{2} (1.57 sq mi)
- Elevation: 364 m (1,194 ft)

Population (2025-12-31)
  - Total: 1,979
  - Density: 487/km^{2} (1,260/sq mi)
- Time zone: UTC+01:00 (CET)
  - Summer (DST): UTC+02:00 (CEST)
- Postal codes: 34329
- Dialling codes: 05605
- Vehicle registration: KS
- Website: www.nieste.de

Nieste (German pronunciation: [ˈniːstə]) is a municipality in the district of Kassel, in Hesse, Germany. It is located 12 kilometers east of Kassel.
