= Esse (Diemel) =

River in Germany

Location
- Country: Germany
- State: Hesse

Physical characteristics
- Mouth
  - location: Diemel
  - coordinates: 51.5647°N 9.4107°E
- Length: 27.6 km (17.1 mi)

Basin features
- Progression: Diemel→ Weser→ North Sea

The Esse is a river of Hesse, Germany. It is a southern and orographically right tributary of the Diemel and joins it near Trendelburg in the district of Kassel.

== See also ==
- List of rivers of Hesse
