= Grebenstein =

- Town
- Coat of arms

- Location of Grebenstein within Kassel district
- Interactive map of Grebenstein
- Location within Germany Location within Hesse
- Coordinates: 51°27′N 09°25′E
- Country: Germany
- State: Hesse
- Admin. region: Kassel
- District: Kassel

Government
  - Mayor (2022–28): Danny Sutor

Area
  - Total: 49.84 km^{2} (19.24 sq mi)
- Elevation: 249 m (817 ft)

Population (2025-12-31)
  - Total: 5,315
  - Density: 106.6/km^{2} (276.2/sq mi)
- Time zone: UTC+01:00 (CET)
  - Summer (DST): UTC+02:00 (CEST)
- Postal codes: 34393
- Dialling codes: 05674
- Vehicle registration: KS or HOG
- Website: www.grebenstein.de

Grebenstein (German pronunciation: [ˈɡʁeːbm̩ˌʃtaɪn]; Low German: Grebensteen) is a town in the district of Kassel, in Hesse, Germany. It is located 16 kilometres (9.9 mi) northwest of Kassel on the German Timber-Frame Road.

In 1762 it was the scene of a battle between British-German and French troops during the Seven Years' War.

== Gallery ==
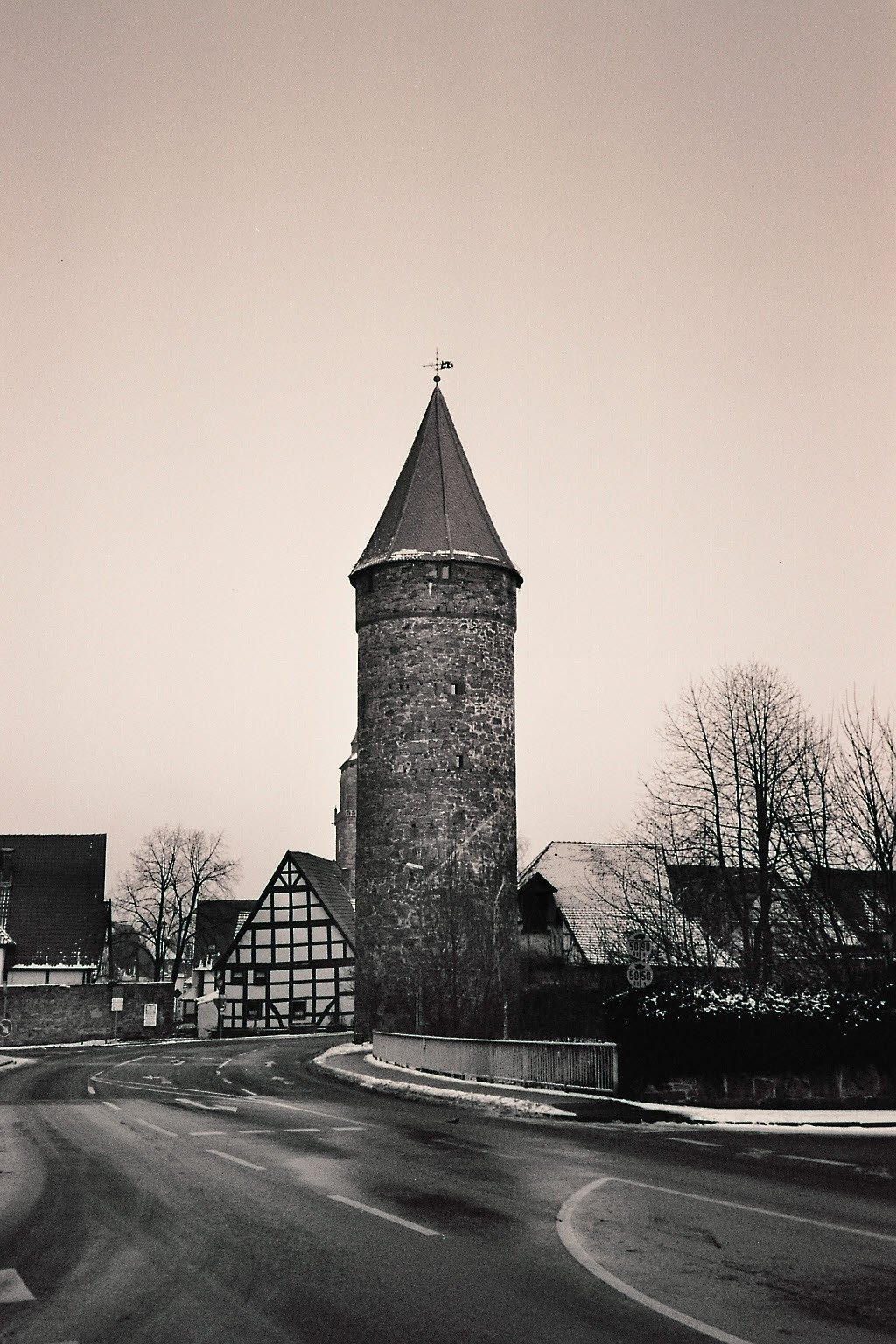
One of the historic towers on the town wall

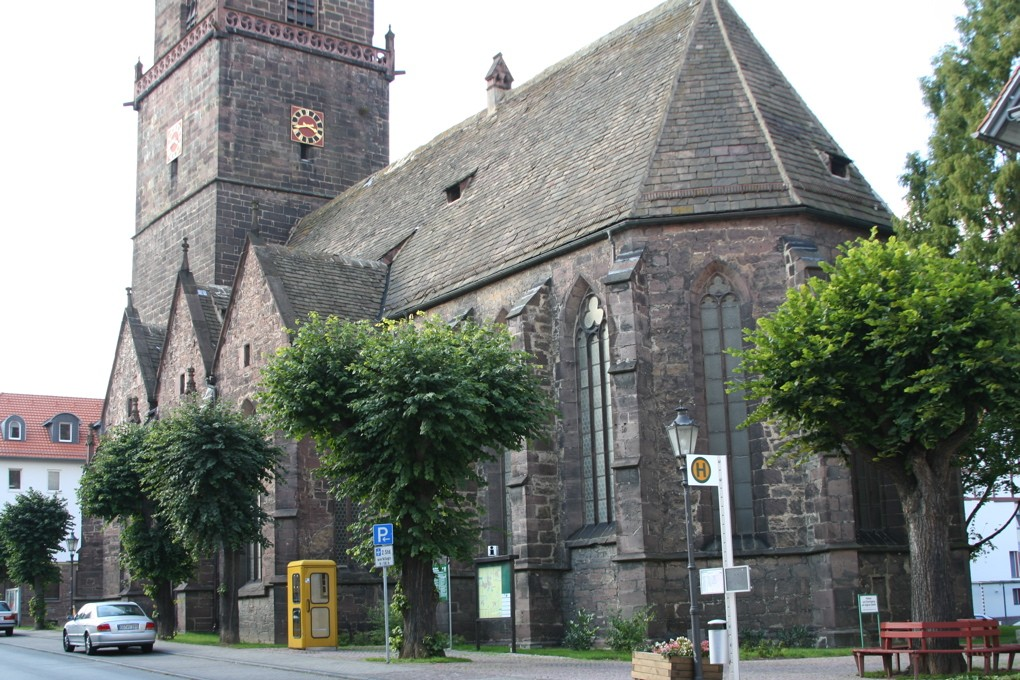
Parish church, 2005
