= Trendelburg =

- Town
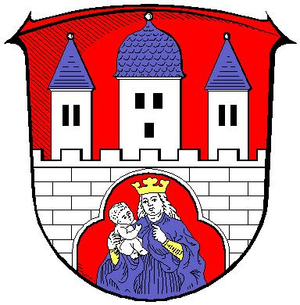
- Coat of arms

- Location of Trendelburg within Kassel district
- Interactive map of Trendelburg
- Location within Germany Location within Hesse
- Coordinates: 51°35′N 09°25′E
- Country: Germany
- State: Hesse
- Admin. region: Kassel
- District: Kassel

Government
  - Mayor (2023–29): Manuel Zeich

Area
  - Total: 69.37 km^{2} (26.78 sq mi)
- Elevation: 130 m (430 ft)

Population (2025-12-31)
  - Total: 4,705
  - Density: 67.82/km^{2} (175.7/sq mi)
- Time zone: UTC+01:00 (CET)
  - Summer (DST): UTC+02:00 (CEST)
- Postal codes: 34388
- Dialling codes: 05675
- Vehicle registration: KS
- Website: www.trendelburg.de

Trendelburg (German pronunciation: [ˈtʁɛndl̩ˌbʊʁk]) is a town in the district of Kassel, in Hesse, Germany with a population of 5,282 on 30 September 2009. It is situated on the river Diemel, near where the Esse joins the Diemel, and is 29 km (18 miles) north of Kassel.

The town is twinned with Pocklington, England.

Trendelburg is located on the German Timber-Frame Road.

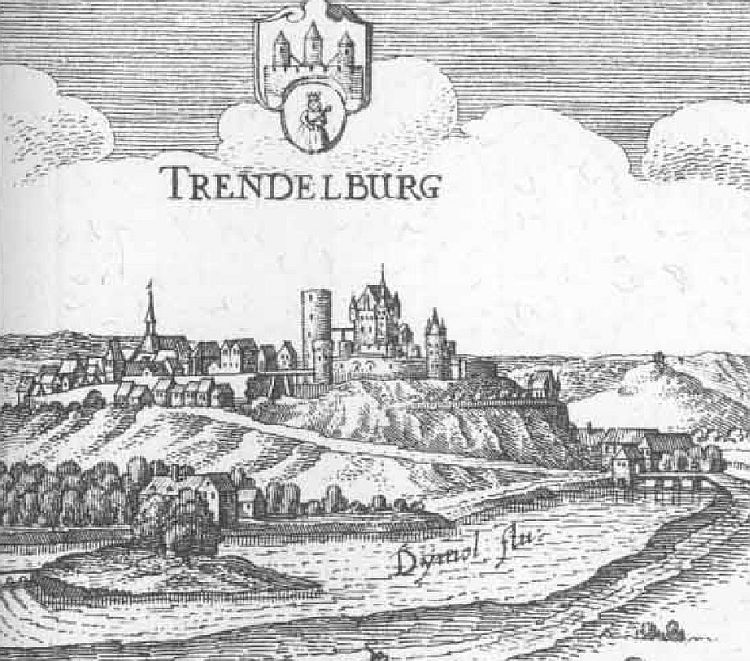
Trendelburg, 1655 (Topographia Hassiae)
