= Diemel =

River in Germany

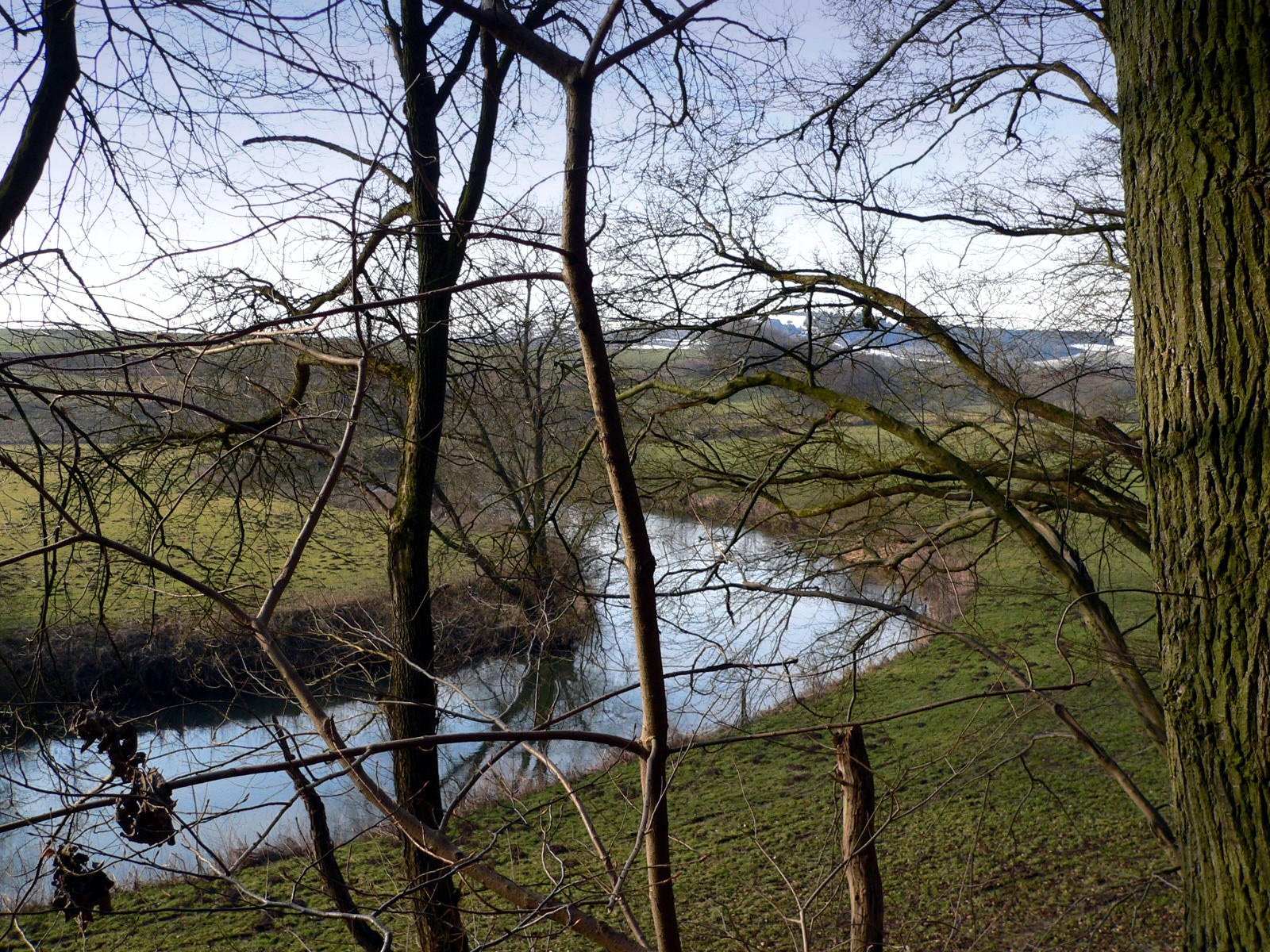
- The Diemel near Trendelburg

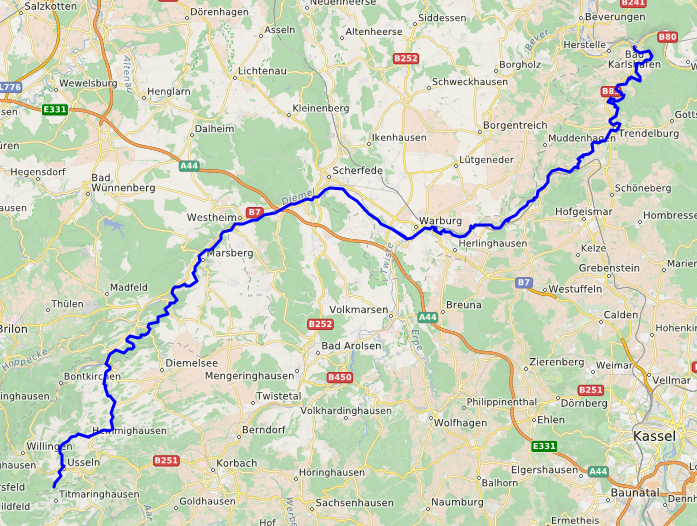

Location
- Country: Germany

Physical characteristics
- Source
  - location: Sauerland
  - coordinates: 51°15′59″N 8°39′05″E
  - elevation: 680 m (2,230 ft)
- Mouth
  - location: Weser
  - coordinates: 51°38′33″N 9°26′52″E
- Length: 110.4 km (68.6 mi)
- Basin size: 1,762 km^{2} (680 sq mi)

Basin features
- Progression: Weser→ North Sea
- Tributaries
  - right: Twiste

The Diemel (German pronunciation: [ˈdiːml̩]) is a river in Hesse and North Rhine-Westphalia, Germany. It is a western and orographically left tributary of the Weser. It is the first, and therefore southernmost, of the larger Weser tributaries after its formation at the confluence of the Fulda and Werra rivers.

The Twiste is a tributary of the Diemel, joining the latter from the right in Warburg.

== Route ==
The source of the Diemel is near Willingen, in Sauerland. The Diemel flows generally northeast through the towns Marsberg, Warburg, and Trendelburg. It flows into the Weser in Bad Karlshafen.
