= Bramwald =

Hill range in Germany

Coordinates: 51°30′N 9°39′E

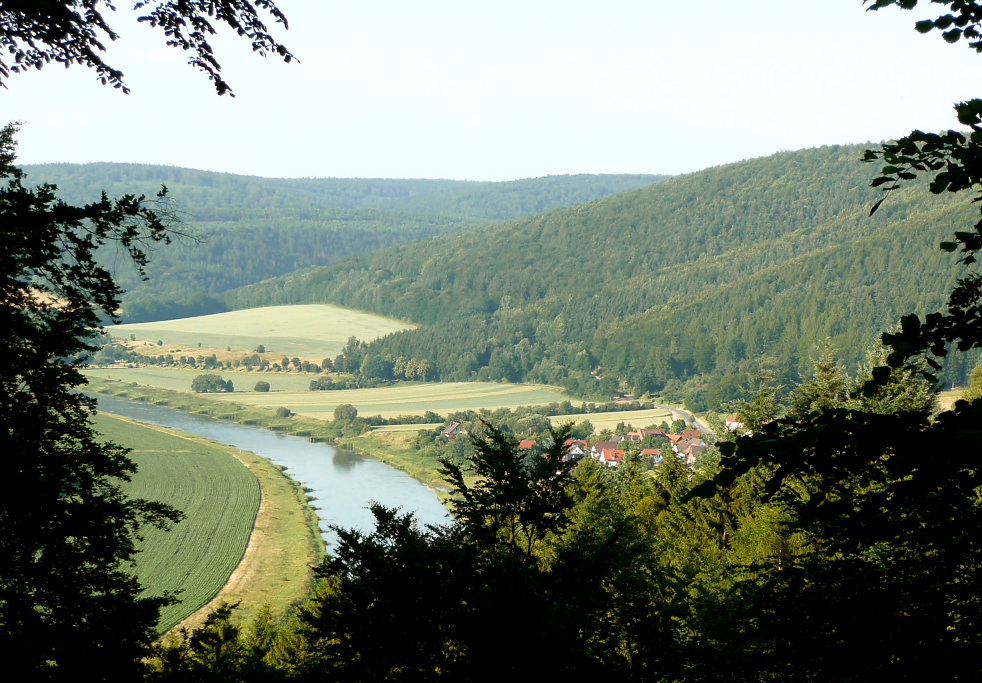
View from the Bramburg onto the Bramwald, in the valley of the Weser and the Hemeln village of Glashütte

The Bramwald is a range of hills up to 408.1 m above sea level (NN) in the Weser Uplands in Lower Saxony (Germany). It is a unique, natural, wild, hill and forest landscape. This is particularly so in the north around the Totenberg.

== Geography ==
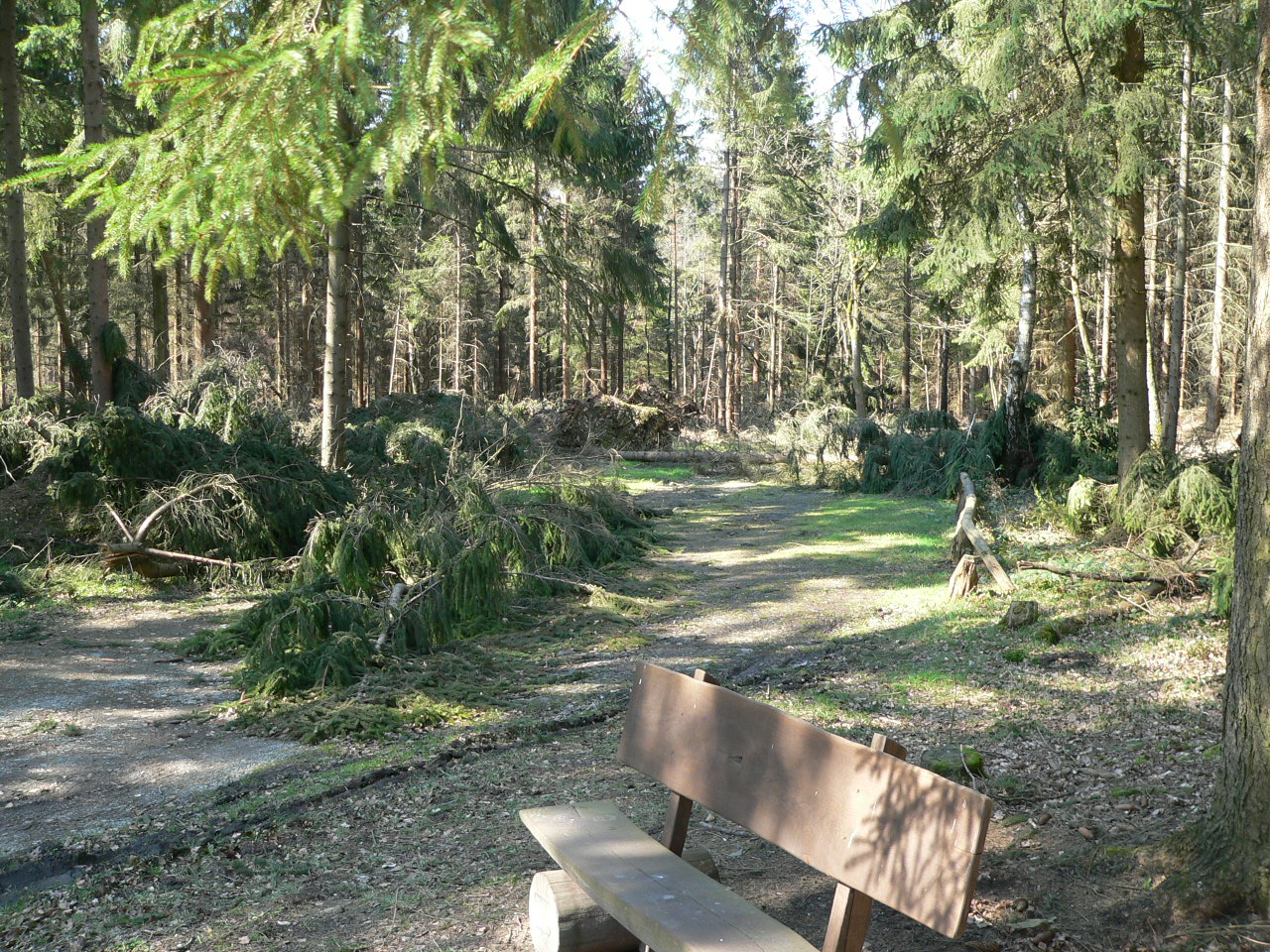
Storm damage in the Bramwald

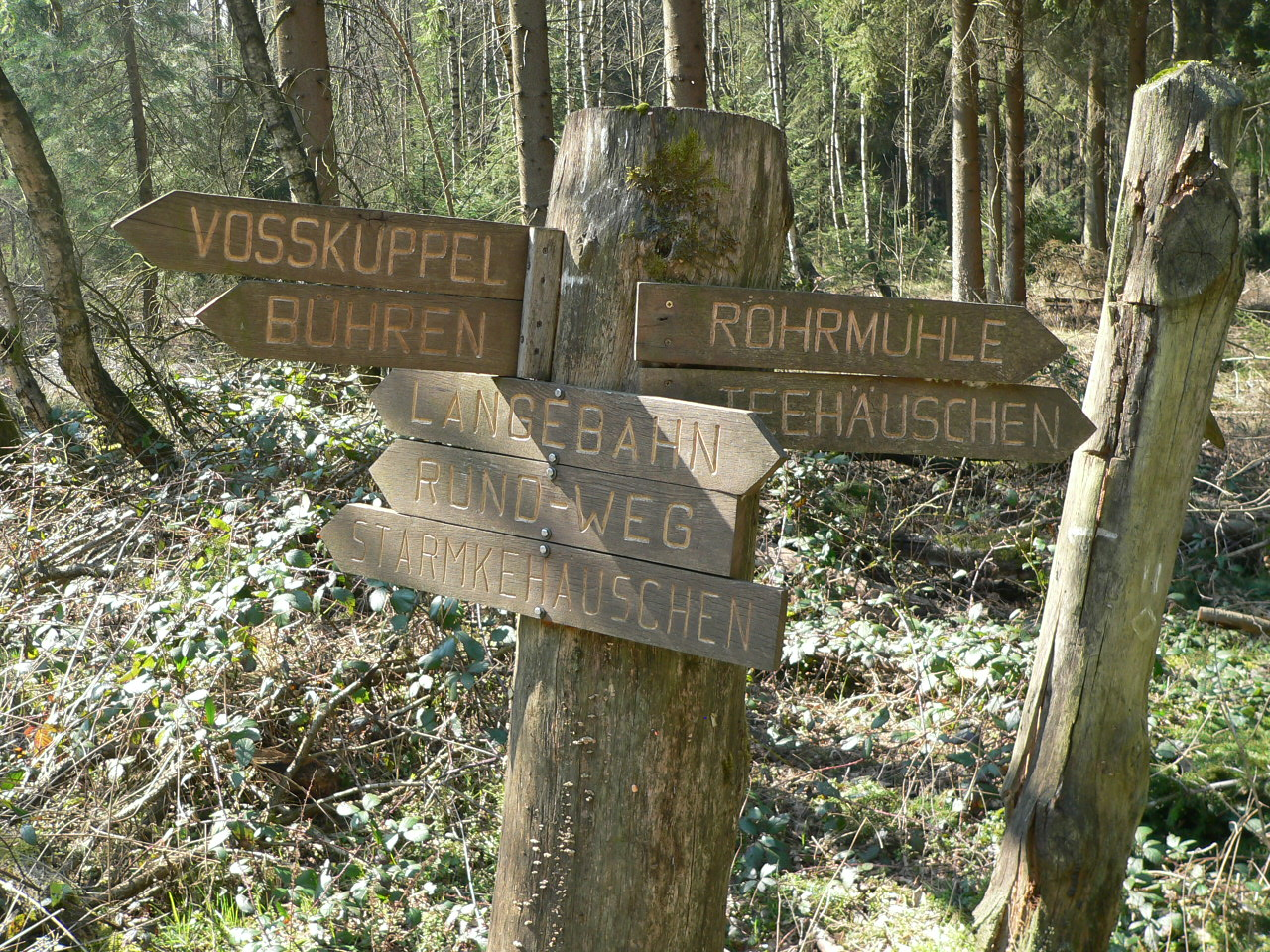
Signposts in the Bramwald

The Bramwald in the northwest of the Münden Nature Park lies in South Lower Saxony some 20 km (as the crow flies) west of Göttingen and 5 km north of the town of Hann. Münden. It lies east of the upper, southern course of the Weser, whose western banks are dominated by the vast Reinhardswald forest in North Hesse. North of the Bramwald are the Kiffing hills, which lie south of the Schwülme valley and north of the Bramwald's north-northwestern foothills.

The long ridge of the Bramwald is part of the state forest of Bramwald and is bordered in the north by the state forest of Bad Karlshafen and in the south by the Hann. Münden state forest. Its highest hill is the Totenberg (408 m), which lies in the north of the forested region and is surrounded by a large nature reserve.

The Bramwald is crossed in an east–west direction by a section of the Frau Holle Path and in a north–south direction by the Upland to Weser Uplands Path, as well as a few, narrow roads, such as the Landesstraße 560, which links Hemeln and Reinhardshagen in the west with Niemetal-Ellershausen in the east. The German Fairy Tale Route also runs along this road through the forest following part of the Frau-Holle-Route.

== Hills ==
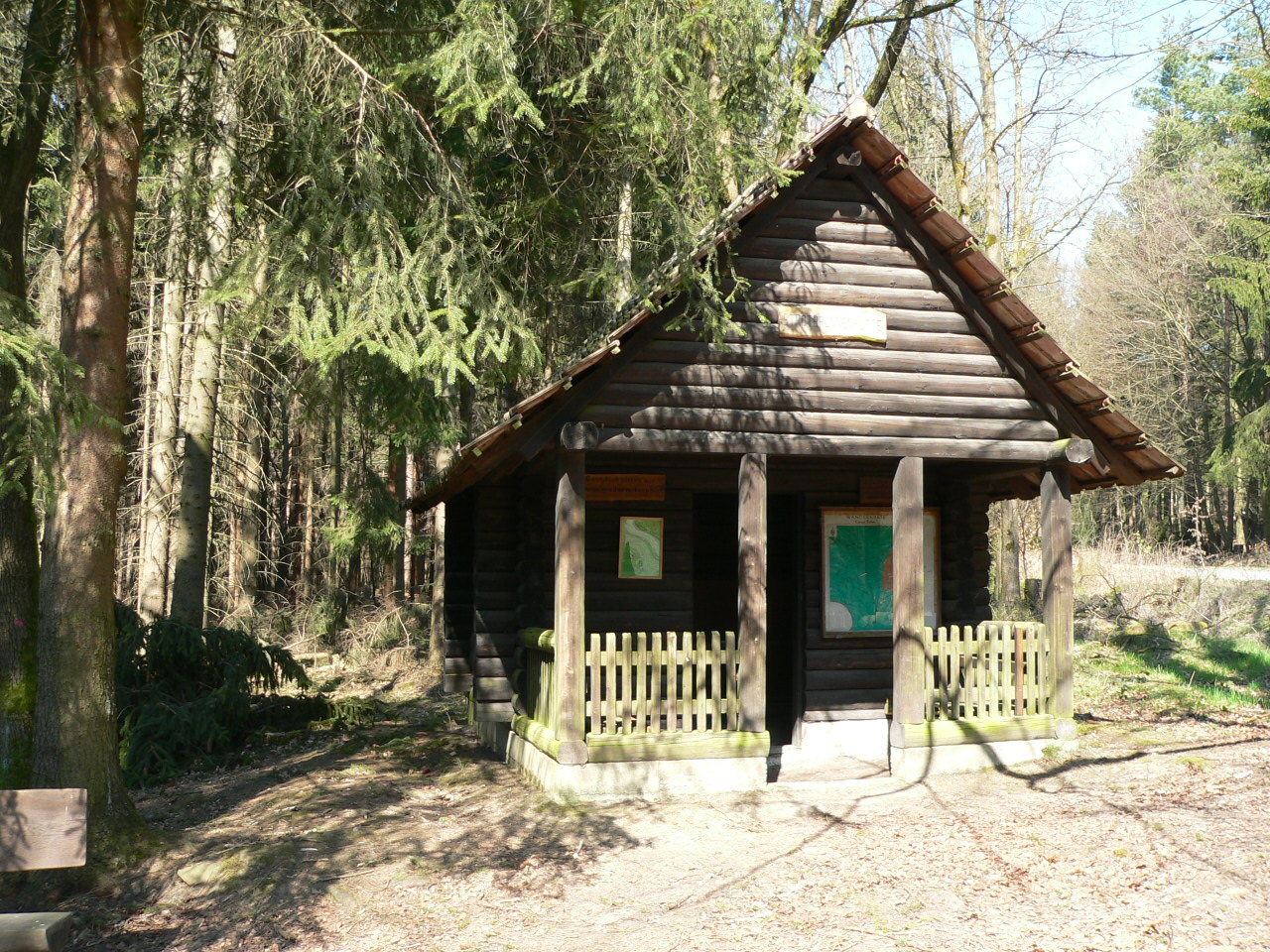
Refuge hut in the Bramwald

The following hills belong to the Bramwald (excluding hills in the Kiffing):

- Totenberg (408 m above sea level (NN))
- Heidelberg (401 m)
- Klingenberg (399 m)
- Hünenkopf (389 m)
- Sandberg (382,3 m)
- Klagesberg (381 m)
- Vaaker Berg (380 m)
- Schiffberg (377 m)
- Klingenberg (373 m)
- Speerberg (368 m)
- Hüttenberg (360 m)
- Lange Lieth (346 m)
- Spieker hill (313 m)
- Mühlberg (212 m)

== Streams ==
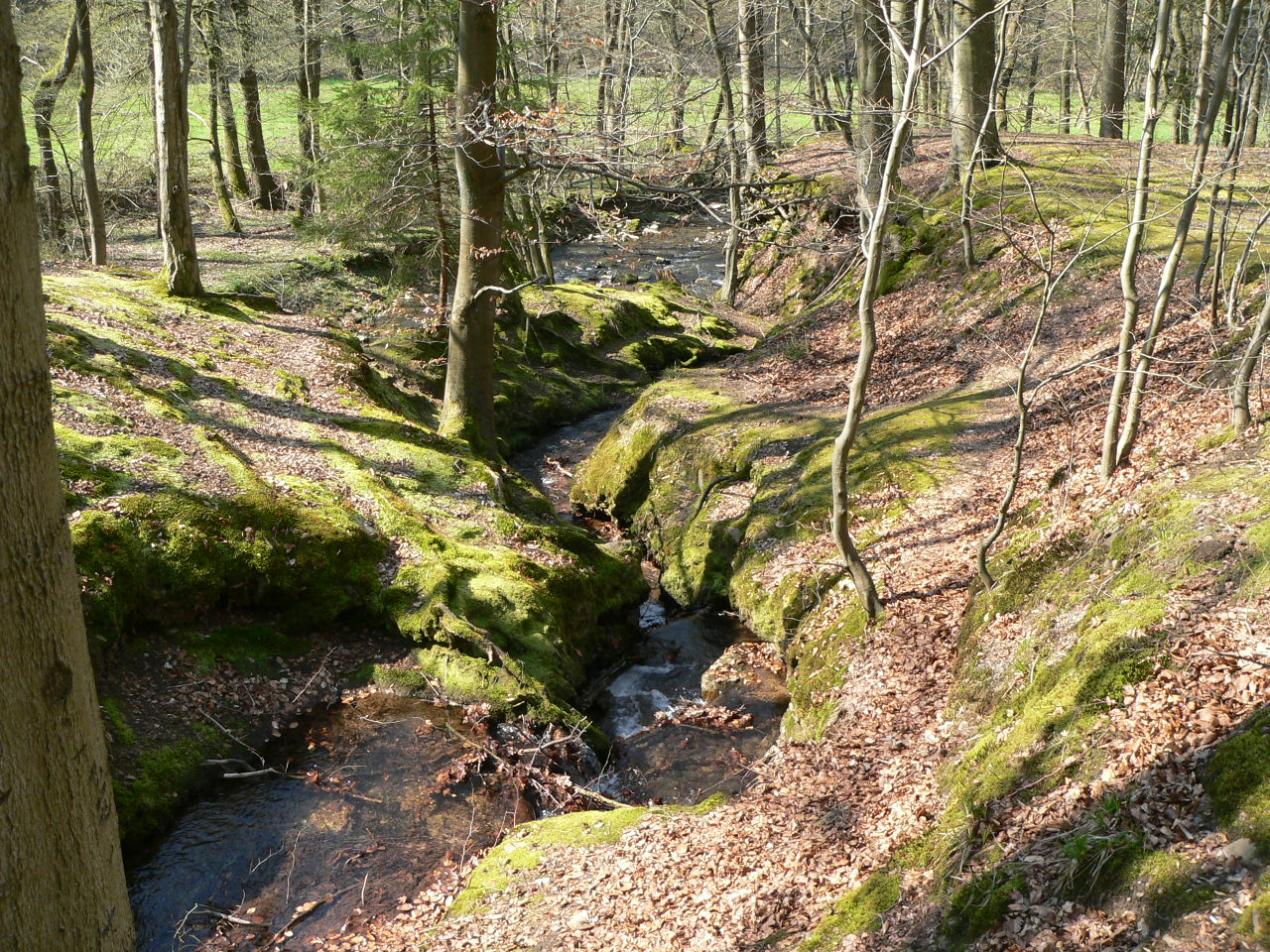
Bramwald: confluence of the Quarmke with the Nieme

The following streams may be found in and around the Bramwald, most of which run in an east–west direction:

- Hasselgraben – rises in the north of the Bramwald and flows into the Thielebach
- Hessenbach – rises in the extreme north of the Bramwald, flows towards the northeast and belongs to the catchment area of the Schwülme
- Nieme – rises in the south of the Bramwald, crosses it in the north and flows into the Weser
- Rehbach – rises in the north of the Bramwald and flows into the Nieme
- Schede – rises in the south of the Bramwald, passes it to the south and flows into the Weser
- Schwülme – rises in the south of the Solling, passes the Bramwald to the northeast and flows into the Weser
- Thielebach – rises in the north of the Bramwald, crosses this region and flows into the Weser
- Weser – begins south of the Bramwald at the confluence of the Fulda and Werra and passes the Bramwald to the west

== Places of interest ==
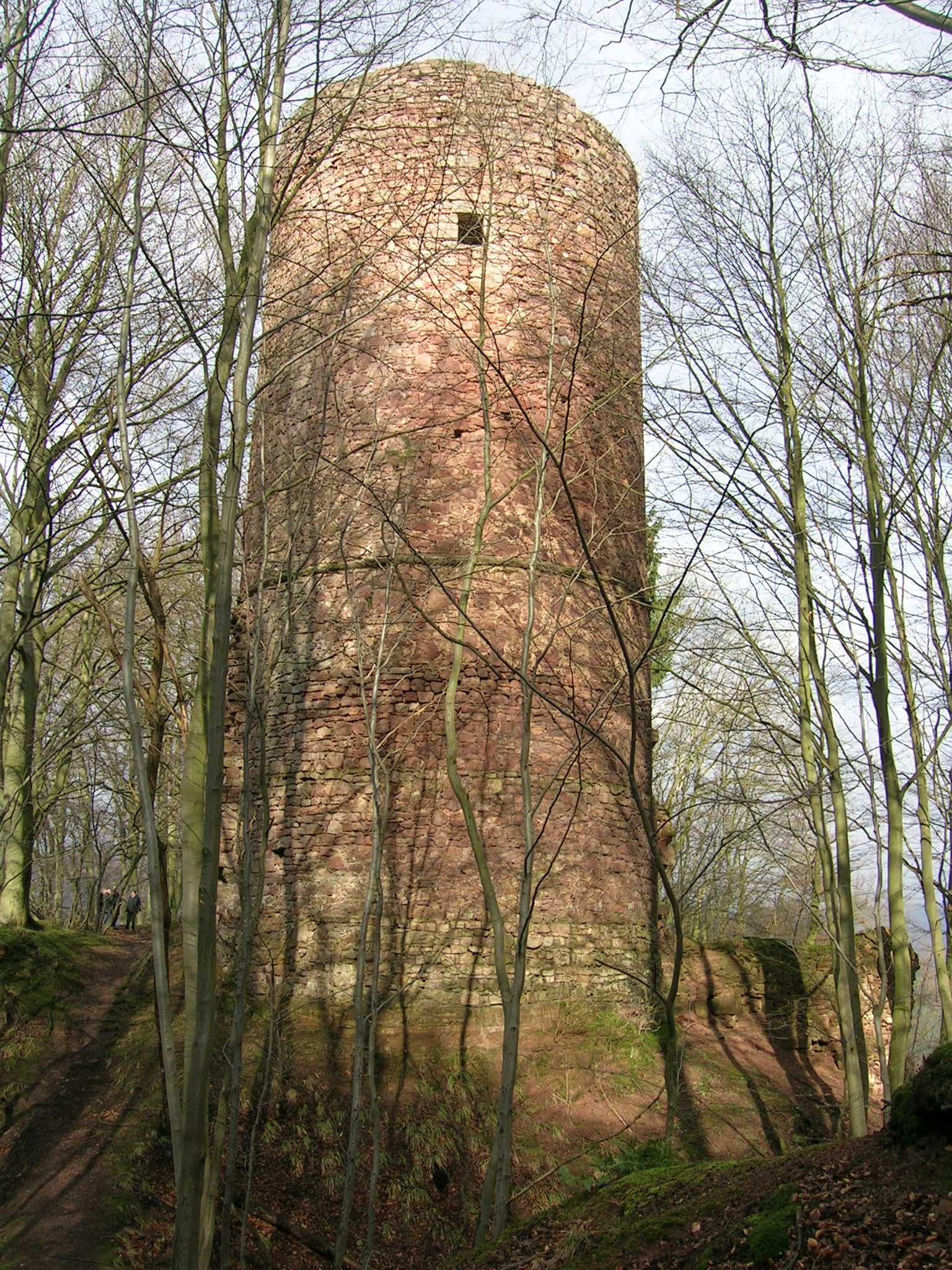
The keep of the Bramburg

Amongst the points of interest, natural and cultural monuments of the Bramwald are the:

- Ruins of Bramburg castle (between Hemeln and Glashütte)
- Hinüber Beech (‘’Hinüberbuche’’) (east of Vaake)
- Hedwig Oak (‘’Hedwigseiche’’) (north of Volkmarshausen)
- several tumuli (e. g. east of Vaake)
- the circular rampart of Hünenburg near the Bramburg (between Hemeln and Glashütte)
- Köhler-Liesel Hut (south of the Totenberg)
- Fairy Tale Beech (‘’Märchenbuche’’) (between Hemeln and Glashütte)
- Quartzite blocks (east of Hemeln)
- Schwedenschanze (northwest of Volkmarshausen)
- Totenberg Hut (north of the Totenberg)
- Wilhelm-Magerkurt Oak (east of Hemeln)

== Neighbouring forest ==
The following forests adjoin the Bramwald:

- Kiffing to the north
- Dransfeld State Forest to the east
- Kaufungen Forest – some way to the south
- Reinhardswald – beyond the Weser to the west

== Towns and villages ==
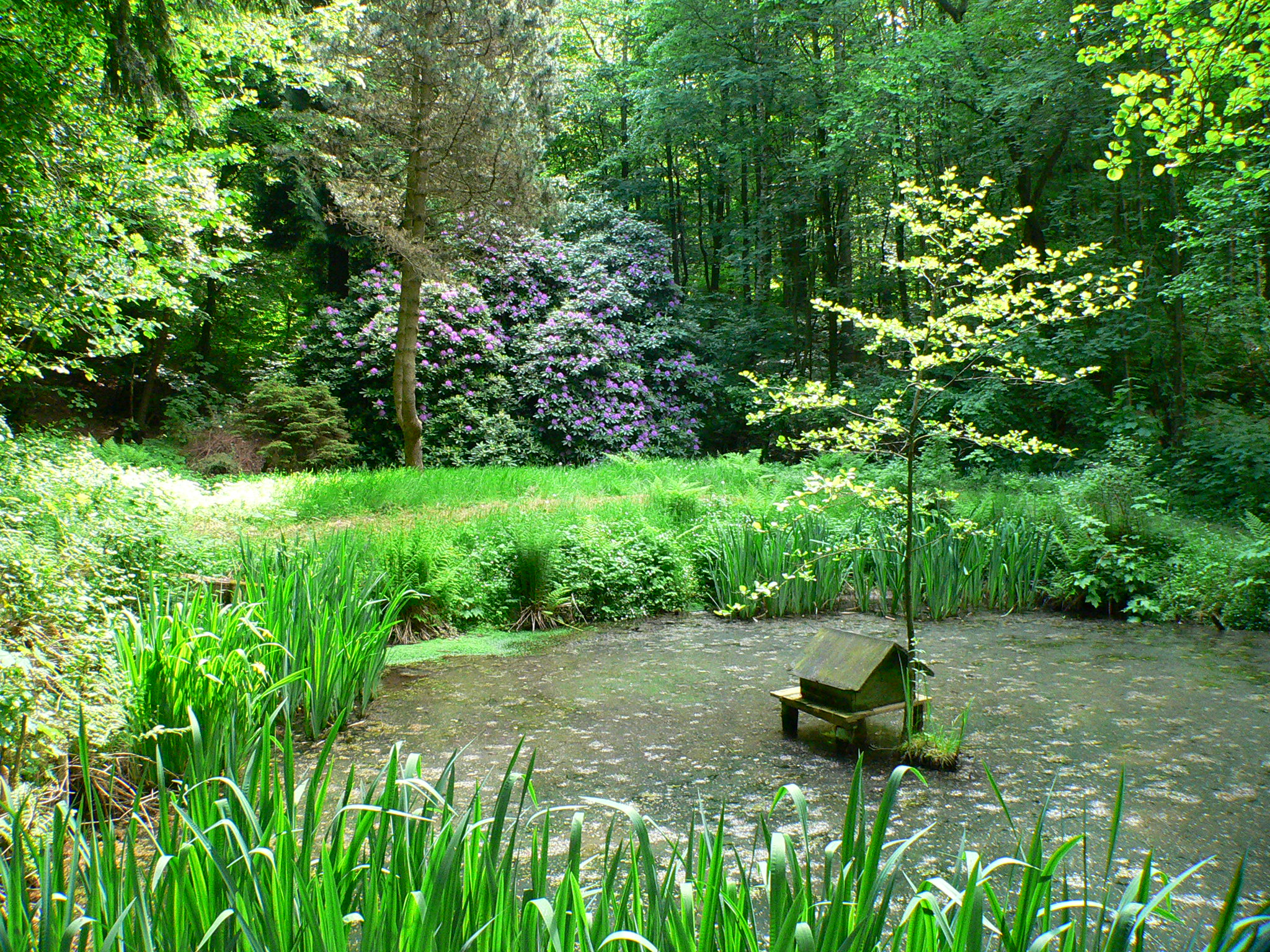
Pond by the mill of Rohrmühle near Hemeln

The actual Bramwald is uninhabited, but the following towns and villages lie nearby.

- in the north:
  - Fürstenhagen (part of Uslar)
- in the east:
  - Mielenhausen (part of Hann. Münden)
  - Bühren (municipality)
  - Niemetal (municipality with the villages of Ellershausen and Löwenhagen)
- in the south:
  - Hilwartshausen (part of Hann. Münden)
  - Gimte (part of Hann. Münden)
  - Volkmarshausen (part of Hann. Münden)
- in the west:
  - Hemeln (municipality with Bursfelde and Glashütte; part of Hann. Münden)
  - Reinhardshagen (municipality with the villages of Veckerhagen and Vaake on the other, western, bank of the Weser in North Hesse)
- in the northwest:
  - Oberweser (with the villages of Gottstreu and Gieselwerder on the other, western, bank of the Weser and Oedelsheim in North Hesse)
