= Totenberg =

Highest hill in the Bramwald in the Weser Uplands in South Lower Saxony

- Location within Lower Saxony

Highest point
- Elevation: 408.1 m above sea level (NN) (1,339 ft)
- Coordinates: 51°31′43″N 9°38′55″E

Geography
- Location: South Lower Saxony, Germany
- Parent range: Weser Uplands

The Totenberg, at 408.1 m above sea level (NN), is the highest hill in the Bramwald, a forested hill range in the Weser Uplands in South Lower Saxony.

The hill is surrounded by the Totenberg nature reserve with an area of about 437 hectares, of which 342 ha is managed as "near-natural forest". The rest is designated as Naturwald (95 ha) where logging is prohibited. Signs indicate that it may not be entered.

== Geography ==
=== Location ===
The Totenberg is in the western part of the district of Göttingen in the northern half of the Bramwald and the Münden Nature Park. The River Nieme flows around the lower part of its northern slopes and discharges into the Upper Weser somewhat further west near Bursfelde. Southwest of the hill is Hemeln, to the southeast is the municipality of Niemetal.

=== Topography and geology ===
Between 195 and 408 metres the Totenberg lies on typical Bunter Sandstone beds mixed in with loess.
