= Wahlberg =

Wahlberg may refer to:

- Wahlberg (surname), including a list of people with the name
- Wahlberg's cormorant (bank cormorant, Phalacrocorax neglectus), a medium-sized cormorant
- Wahlberg's eagle (Aquila wahlbergi), a medium-sized raptor named after the Swedish naturalist Johan August Wahlberg
- Wahlberg's epauletted fruit bat (Epomophorus wahlbergi), a species of bat in the family Pteropodidae
- Wahlberg's honeybird (Prodotiscus regulus), a species of bird
- Wahlberg's Kalahari gecko (Pachydactylus wahlbergii), a species of reptile
- Wahlberg's velvet gecko (Homopholis wahlbergii), a species of reptile

== See also ==
- Walburg (disambiguation)
- St. Walburg (disambiguation)
- Walberg, surname
- Wallburg (disambiguation)
- Wallberg (disambiguation)
- Wahlsburg, municipality in Germany
