= Wahlberg (surname) =

Wahlberg is a surname of Swedish origin. Notable people with the name include:

- Alfred Wahlberg (1834–1906), Swedish landscape painter
- David Emanuel Wahlberg (1882–1949), Swedish sports writer
- Donnie Wahlberg (born 1969), American singer, actor and producer
- Ernst Wahlberg (1904–1977), Swedish footballer, Swedish national team
- Gideon Wahlberg (1890–1948), Swedish actor, screenwriter and film director
- Johan August Wahlberg (1810–1856), Swedish naturalist and explorer
- Julia Wahlberg (born 1995), Swedish women's league footballer
- Kajsa Wahlberg, Swedish police officer and national rapporteur on human trafficking
- Karin Wahlberg (born 1950), Swedish obstetrician and author
- Karl Wahlberg (1874–1934), Swedish curler
- Mark Wahlberg (born 1971), American actor and television producer, also known in music as Marky Mark
- Nils Erik Wahlberg (1885–1977), engineer and automotive pioneer
- Paul Wahlberg (born 1964), co-founder of Wahlburgers and lead in the similarly titled TV reality show
- Peter Fredrik Wahlberg (1820–1906), Swedish entomologist and professor
- Robert Wahlberg (born 1967), American actor
- Stefan Wahlberg (born 1966), Swedish television producer, journalist and columnist

== See also ==
- Walberg, a surname
- Walburg (disambiguation), includes a list of people with surname Walburg
- Wallberg (disambiguation), includes a list of people with surname Wallberg
- Wallburg (disambiguation), includes a list of people with surname Wallburg
