= Kiffing =

Range of hills in Germany

Coordinates: 51°36′30″N 9°36′01″E

The Kiffing is a range of hills, relatively small in area and up to 344.1 m above sea level (NN), in the district of Kassel in the German state of Hesse.

== Geography ==
The Kiffing hills in the extreme north of Hesse belong to the southern ranges of the Weser Uplands. They are located between the southern foothills of the Solling in the north and the northern foothills of the Bramwald in the south. To the northeast and north they are passed by the lower reaches of the river Schwülme, to the southwest and west by a stretch of the Upper Weser, beyond whose western banks looms the Reinhardswald. The Kiffing lies between Wahlsburg to the northwest, Uslar to the northeast and Oberweser to the south.

== Landscape description ==
The Kiffing, which attains at height of up to 344.1 m (1,129 ft) at the Heuberg, and whose eastern section belongs to the State Forest of Bad Karlshafen, is a heavily wooded region, apart from its western and northeastern foothills. In the north, above and to the southeast of the Pfeiffengrund valley, is the Lippoldsberg Clinic and Rehabilitation Centre. In the northeast above the Köhlergrund valley is the small Steinklippen and in the east, at the so-called Sattel, is a small rifle range.

== Hills ==
The hills and elevations of the Kiffing range include:

- Heuberg (344.1 m above sea level (NN))
- Zwersberg (319.7 m (1,049 ft))
- Rappenhagen (300.7 m (987 ft))
- Wahlsburg (ca. 245 m (804 ft); with its circular rampart)
- Steinklippen (237 m (778 ft))

== Streams ==
The streams in and around the Kiffing include the:

- Föhrenbach (tributary of the Weser)
- Höllengraben (tributary of the Weser)
- Rodenbach (tributary of the Schwülme)
- Schwülme (tributary of the Weser)
- Weser (river running into the North Sea)

== Towns and villages ==
The towns and villages located around the Kiffing are:

- Lippoldsberg (Wahlsburg) in the northwest
- Vernawahlshausen (Wahlsburg) in the north
- Ahlbershausen (Uslar) in the east-northeast
- Arenborn (Oberweser) in the east
- Heisebeck (Oberweser) in the southeast
- Fürstenhagen (zu Uslar) in the south-southeast
- Oedelsheim (Oberweser) in the south
- Gieselwerder (Oberweser) in the southwest

== Literature and sources ==
The information in this article is based on:

- Topografische Freizeitkarte "Naturpark Habichtswald / Reinhardswald" ('TF 50-HR', 1:50.000; 2003), herausgegeben vom 'Hessisch-Waldeckischen Gerbirgs- und Heimatverein eV.' und 'Hessischen Landesvermessungsamt' (ISBN 3-89446-319-8)
- Rad- u. Wanderkarte "Reinhardswald, Weserlauf u. Bramwald" (1:33.333), herausgegeben vom Geo-Verlag (Kaufungen)
