= Haferberg =

Hill in Hesse and Lower Saxony, Germany

- Location within Hesse

Highest point
- Elevation: 580.4 m above sea level (NN) (1,904 ft)
- Coordinates: 51°19′17″N 9°44′07″E

Geography
- Location: Hesse, Lower Saxony, Germany
- Parent range: Kaufungen Forest

The Haferberg is a hill, 580.4 m above sea level (NN), in the Kaufungen Forest in Hesse and Lower Saxony in Germany.

== Geography ==
The densely wooded Haferberg, which is the highest hill in the Münden Nature Park, is located on the border of north Hesse (Werra-Meißner district) and south Lower Saxony (Göttingen district), 1.25 km northwest of the pass of Umschwang, around 4.5 km east of Nieste and just under 4 km (all distances as the crow flies) west of Kleinalmerode.

On the crooked state border in the area of the Haferberg, north Hesse is to the northeast and south Lower Saxony to the west; its summit rises around 40 m west of the line on the Lower Saxon side. Along this border runs part of boundary between the Meißner-Kaufungen Forest Nature Park (Hesse) with the neighbouring Münden Nature Park (Lower Saxony) to its north, the summit belonging to the latter.

No roads lead to the peak of the Haferberg, but it may be reached, for example by walking from the Umschwang (446 m above NN) along the Frau Holle Path. Southeast and on the far side of this pass the path leads up to the hill of Mühlenstein (607.2 m above NN).

== Watersheds ==
The Haferberg is on the watershed between the river Fulda to the west and river Werra to the northeast. The Rautenbach rises on the northern side of the hill and the Hungershäuser Bach to the southeast, near the Umschwang; both are western tributaries of the Werra. The Wengebach rises southeast of the hill, also near the Umschwang, and to the west, the Endschlagbach, which are eastern and northern feeders respectively of the Fulda tributary, the Nieste.
