= Münden Nature Park =

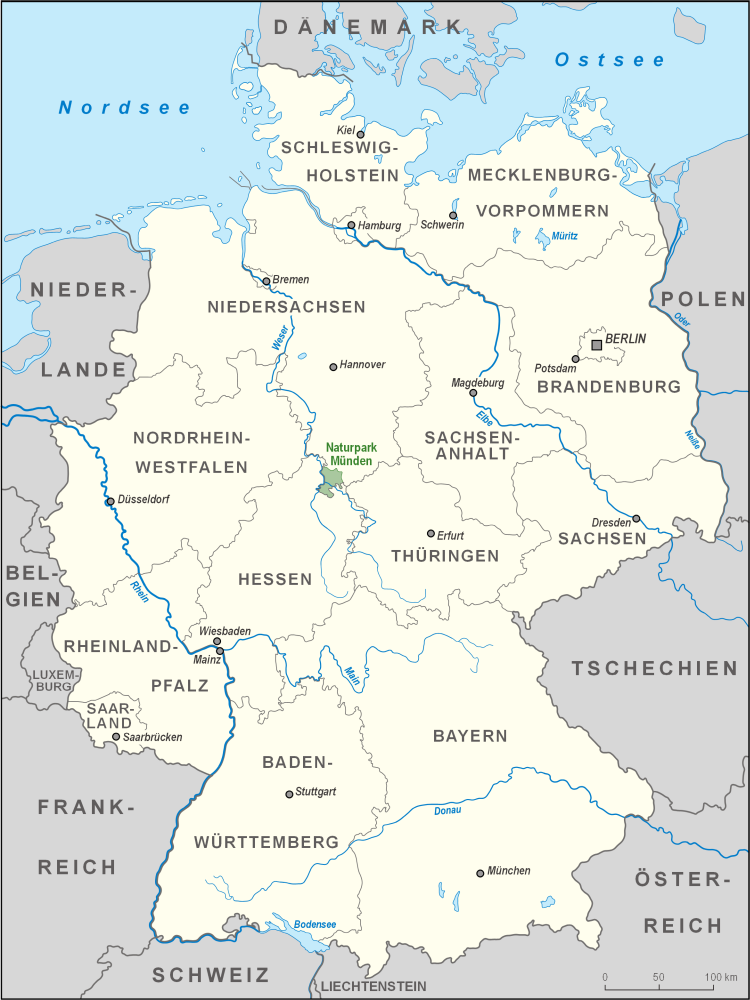
Location of Münden Nature Park

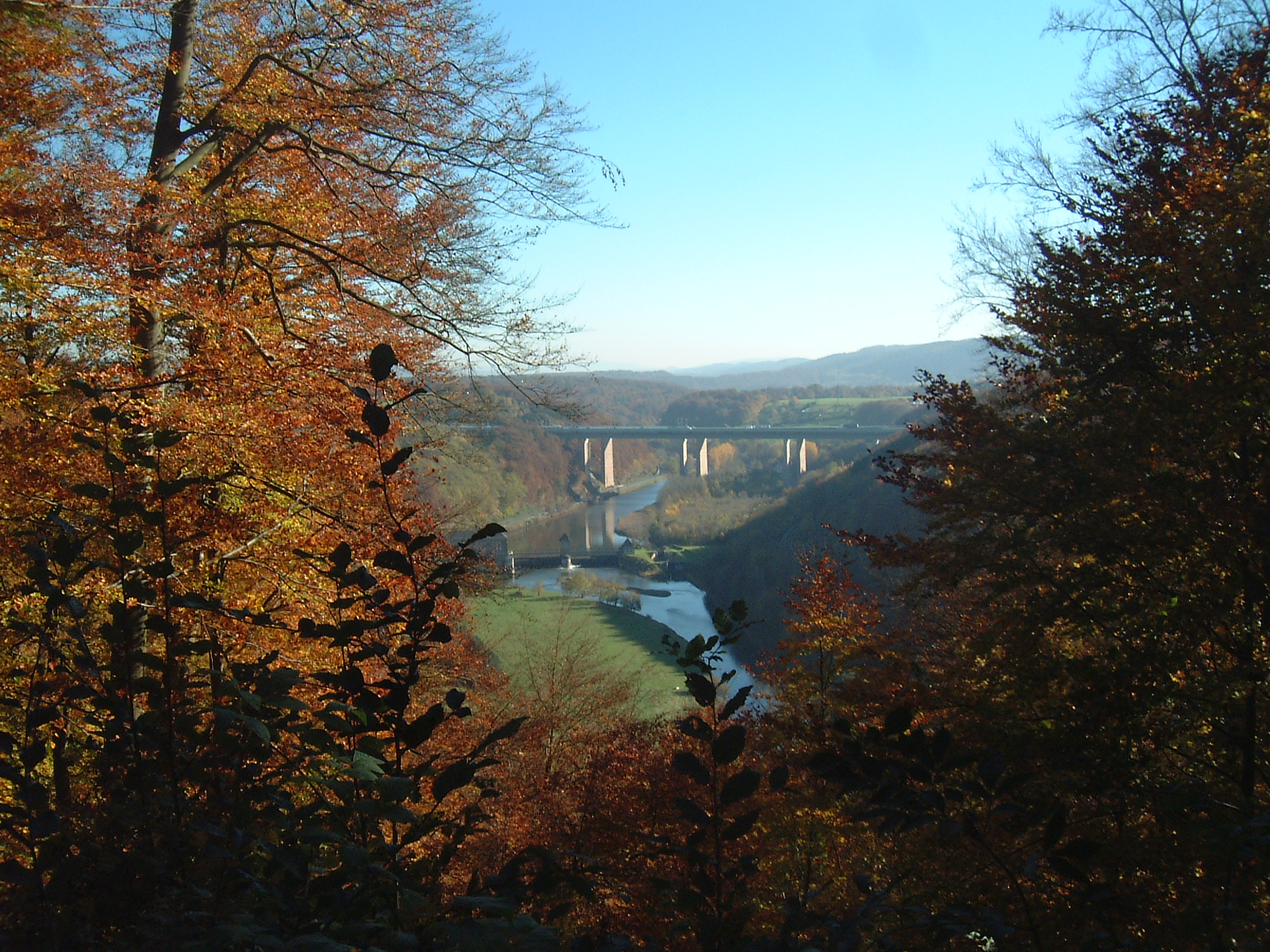
Münden Nature Park View of the Werra valley and Werra valley bridges of the A 7 and ICE routes

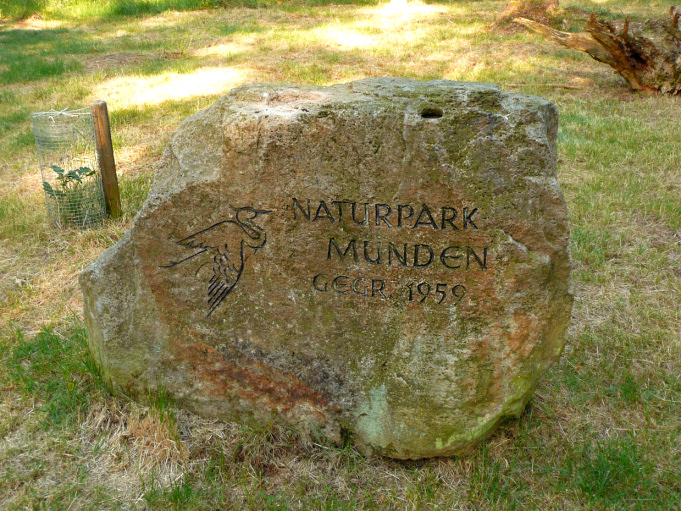
Monument to the nature park’s foundation in 1959 near the Kleiner Steinberg

The Münden Nature Park lies within the district of Göttingen, in south Lower Saxony in Germany.

== Geography ==
This large and densely wooded nature park was founded in 1959 within the borders of the now defunct district of Münden. It is just under 374 square kilometres (144 sq mi) in area and runs almost from the eastern edge of the town of Kassel and border of Hesse in a northerly direction through the northern part of the Kaufungen Forest via Hann. Münden to the Bramwald and Dransfeld Town Forest. It lies south, east and northeast of the confluence of the Fulda and Werra rivers with the Weser and borders in the south and southeast on the Meißner-Kaufungen Forest Nature Park. It is crossed by the A 7 motorway.

Many footpaths criss-cross this forested landscape, including long-distance paths like the Frau Holle Path (Kennzeichnung X4), Werraburgensteig (X5), Studentenpfad (X13) and Fuldahöhenweg (X17). On the Großer Staufenberg there is a glider airfield.

== Hills ==
The hills in the Münden Nature Park include (heights in metres above sea level (NN)):

- Haferberg (581 m)
- Großer Steinberg (542 m)
- Kleiner Steinberg (542 m)
- Steinbergskopf (ca. 532 m)
- Häringsnase (508 m)
- Hoher Hagen (508 m)
- Brackenberg (461,0 m)
- Dransberg (442 m)
- Hohe Schleife (442 m)
- Ossenberg (438 m)
- Steinberg (near Meensen; 435 m)
- Großer Staufenberg (427 m)
- Hühnerfeldberg (425 m)
- Salzleckerkopf (412 m)
- Totenberg (408 m)
- Steinberg (near Dahlenrode; 407 m)
- Sauenberg (395 m)
- Sandberg (382 m)
- Klagesberg (381 m)
- Vaaker Berg (380 m)
- Klingenberg (373 m)
- Kleiner Staufenberg (370,5 m)
- Staufenberg (near Wiershausen; 343 m)
- Blümer Berg (320 m)
- Speeler Kopf (316 m)
- Mühlberg (212 m)

== Places of interest ==
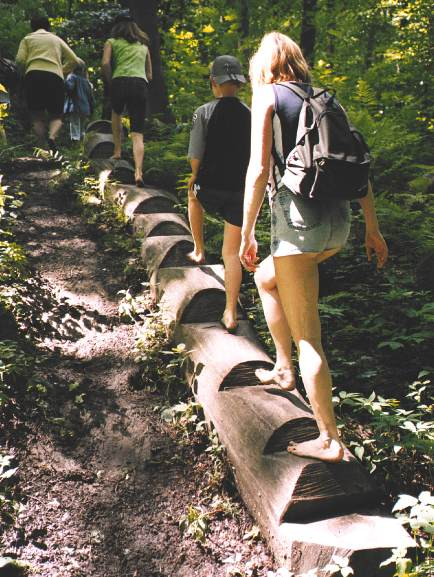
Nienhagen barefoot path in the Münden Nature Park

- Barefoot walk near Nienhagen
- Brackenburg, ruined castle on the Brackenberg near Scheden-Meensen
- Bramburg
- Hemeln − reaction ferry via the Weser to Veckerhagen with its beer garden Zur Fähre ("The Ferry")
- Hohen Hagen − Geology Path and Gauß Tower with its tower restaurant
- Hühnerfeld
- Hühnerfeldberg
- Lippoldsburg
- Naturfreunde, NFH Steinberghaus near Großen Steinberg
- Rinderstall − deer enclosure with inn and small museum, (51°22′26.42″N 9°39′25.35″E)
- Römerlager Hedemünden
- Sichelnstein, ruined castle
- Spiegelburg
- Steinrode, medieval model village of Steinrode near Steinberg youth hostel

== See also ==
- List of the nature parks in Germany
