= Wallburg =

Wallburg is German for hillfort, ringwork or fortified village and may refer to:

== Places ==
- Wallburg, North Carolina
- Wallburg Realschule, a school in Eltmann, Germany
- Wallburg (Ettenheim), a village in the borough of Ettenheim, Germany

== Castles and forts ==
=== Germany ===
- Wallburg Castle, in Lower Franconia, Germany
- Wallburg Tiefenstein, a ruined fort in Waldshut district, Baden-Württemberg, Germany
- Wallburg Kahle near Meggen, Germany
- Wallburg Ambrock, North Rhine-Westphalia, Germany
- Wallburg Kegelriss, Landkreis Breisgau-Hochschwarzwald, Baden-Württemberg, Germany
- Hesselbacher Wallburg, Bad Laasphe in Nordrhein-Westphalia, Germany
- Wallburg Schnürpflingen, Alb-Donau-Kreis, Germany
- Wallburg Jäckelchen, Attendorn, Germany
- Wallburg Badenweiler, Breisgau-Hochschwarzwald, Germany
- Wallburg bei Müngsten, Remscheid, Germany
- Wallburg Haskenau, Münster, Germany

=== Other places ===
- Muhu (Wallburg), Estonia
- Chrobry fortified village in Szprotawa Silesia, known in German as Wallburg Chrobry in Szprotawa

== People ==
- Otto Wallburg (1889–1944), German actor

== See also ==
- Wahlberg (disambiguation)
- Wahlsburg, municipality in Germany
- Walberg, a surname
- Walburg (disambiguation)
- St. Walburg (disambiguation)
- Wallberg (disambiguation)
