= Veckerhagen Ferry =

Cable ferry

Coordinates: 51.498184°N 9.605291°E

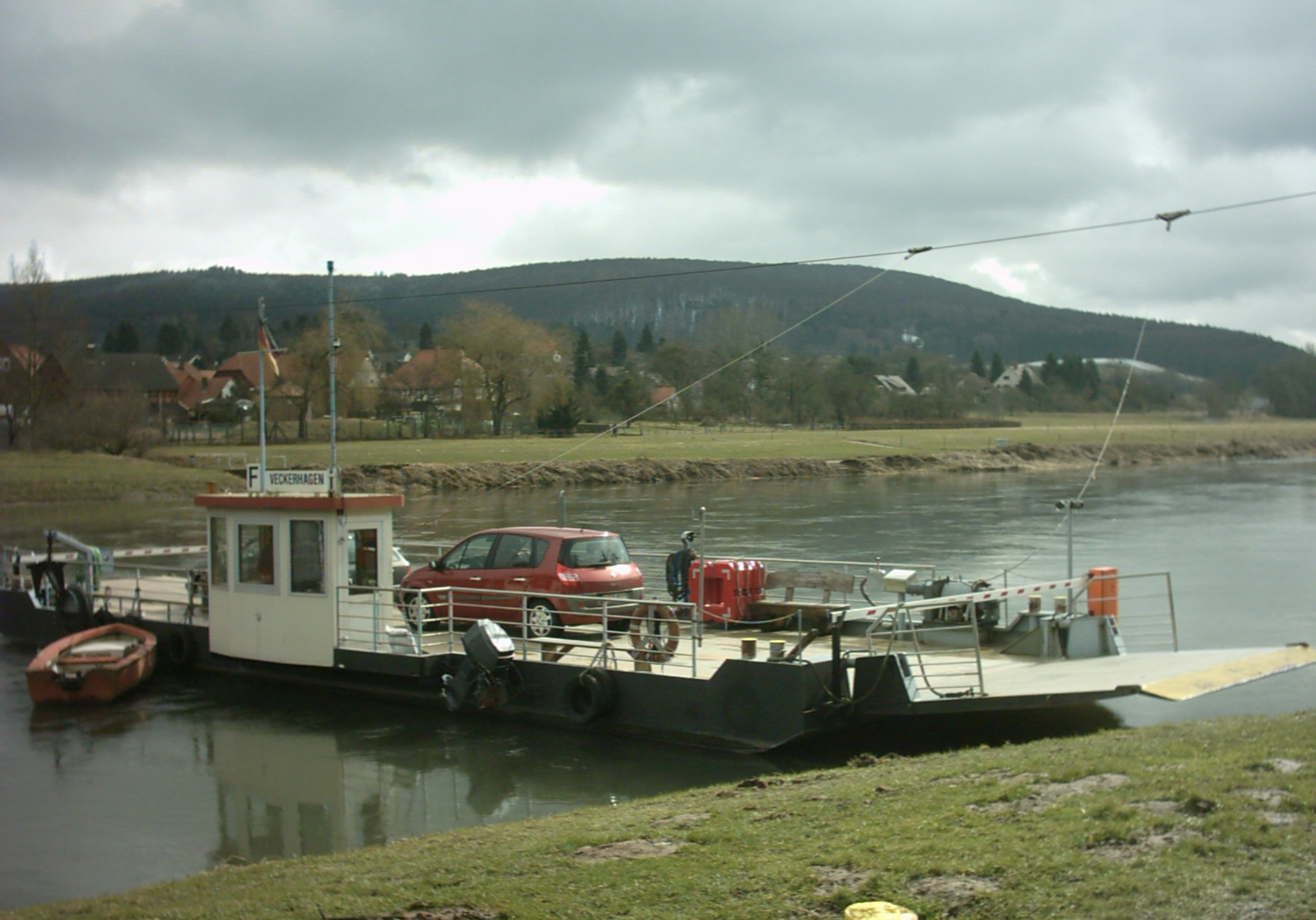
- Locale: Germany
- Waterway: Weser River
- Transit type: Cable ferry

The Veckerhagen Ferry is a cable ferry across the Weser River in Germany. The ferry crosses between Veckerhagen, in Hesse, and Hemeln, in Lower Saxony. The crossing is located some 26 kilometres (16 mi) north of Kassel. The ferry takes automotive, bicycle and foot passengers.

Technically, the ferry is a reaction ferry, which is propelled by the current of the water. An overhead cable is suspended from towers anchored on either bank of the river. The ferry is attached to this overhead cable by bridle cables and pulleys. To operate the ferry, it is angled into the current, causing the force of the current to move the ferry across the river.
