= Weser Valley =

Weser Valley (German: Wesertal) may refer to:

- Upper Weser Valley, in the German federal states of Lower Saxony, Hesse and North Rhine-Westphalia
- Middle Weser Valley, in the German federal states of Lower Saxony and North Rhine-Westphalia
- Weser Depression, the river basin from Porta Westfalica, in Lower Saxony
- Wesertal, a municipality in the district of Kassel, Hesse, Germany

== See also ==
- Porta Westfalica (gorge)
