= Nieste =

Nieste may refer to:

- Nieste (municipality), in the district of Kassel, in Hesse, Germany
- Nieste (river), of Hesse, Germany, tributary of the Fulda
