= Walburg =

Walburg may refer to:

- Saint Walpurga (c. 710–777 or 779), also spelled Walburg, Anglo-Saxon missionary and saint
- Marek Walburg (born 1976), Polish football defender
- Tim Walburg, American politician
- Walburg, Texas, United States, an unincorporated community
- Walburg, a castle in Ohé en Laak, Netherlands

== See also ==
- St. Walburg (disambiguation)
- Walberg, surname
- Wallburg (disambiguation)
- Wahlberg (disambiguation)
- Wallberg (disambiguation)
- Wahlsburg, a municipality in Germany
- Wahlsburg, Ohio, United States, an unincorporated community
