= Schede (river) =

River in Germany

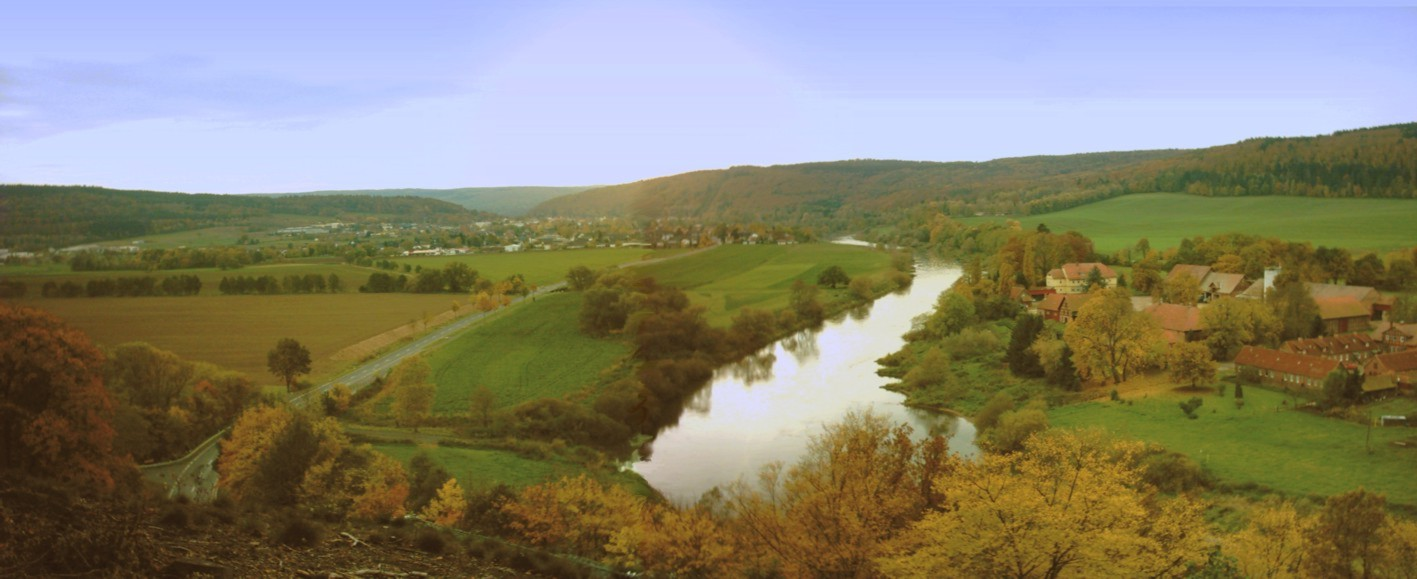
- The Weser near Hilwartshausen at its confluence with the Schede (lower left)

Location
- Country: Germany
- State: Lower Saxony
- District: Göttingen
- Location: near Hann. Münden

Physical characteristics
- Source
  - location: At the eastern edge of the Bramwald forest near Bühren
  - coordinates: 51°28′46″N 9°40′03″E
  - elevation: ca. 300 m above sea level (NHN)
- Mouth
  - location: Opposite of Hilwartshausen (a district of Hann. Münden) into the Weser
  - coordinates: 51°26′58″N 9°38′36″E
  - elevation: ca. 110 m above sea level (NHN)
- Length: 13.2 km (8.2 mi)

Basin features
- Progression: Weser→ North Sea
- Tributaries
  - left: Thielebach

Schede is a river of South Lower Saxony, Germany, in the district of Göttingen. It is 13.2-kilometre-long (8.2 mi) right and eastern tributary of the Weser at Hilwartshausen (a district of Hann. Münden).

== See also ==
- List of rivers of Lower Saxony
