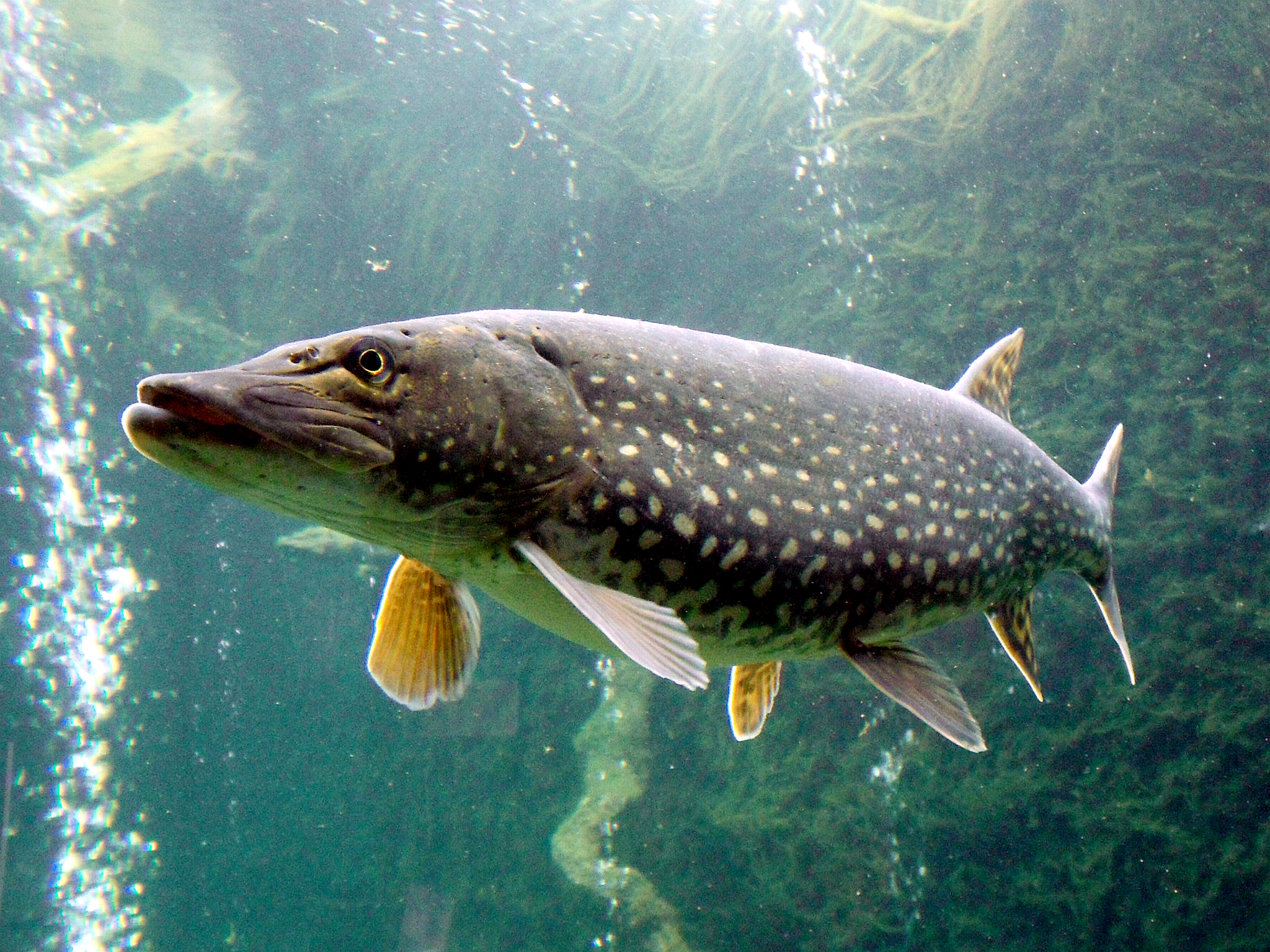
- Northern pike (E. lucius)

Scientific classification
- Kingdom: Animalia
- Phylum: Chordata
- Class: Actinopterygii
- Division: Teleostei
- Order: Salmoniformes
- Family: Esocidae
- Subfamily: Esocinae
- Genus: Esox; Linnaeus, 1758

Type species
- Esox lucius Linnaeus, 1758

= Esox =

Esox Temporal range: Early Paleocene to recent

Genus of fishes

Esox is a genus of freshwater fish commonly known as pike or pickerel. It is the type genus of the family Esocidae. The type species of the genus is Esox lucius, the northern pike.

Esox have a fossil record extending back to the Paleocene. Modern large pike species are native to the Palearctic and Nearctic realms, ranging across Northern America and from Western Europe to Siberia in North Asia.

Pike have the elongated, torpedo-like shape typical of predatory fishes, with sharply pointed heads and sharp teeth. Their coloration is typically grey-green with a mottled or spotted appearance with stripes along their backs, providing camouflage among underwater weeds, and each individual pike marking patterns are unique like fingerprints. Pikes can grow to a maximum recorded length of 1.50 m (5 ft), reaching a maximum recorded weight of 55 lb, 1 oz. They are a long lived species and the skeleton of a particularly large example held in a museum in Mannheim in the nineteenth century was thought to have been up to 100 years old.

== Etymology ==
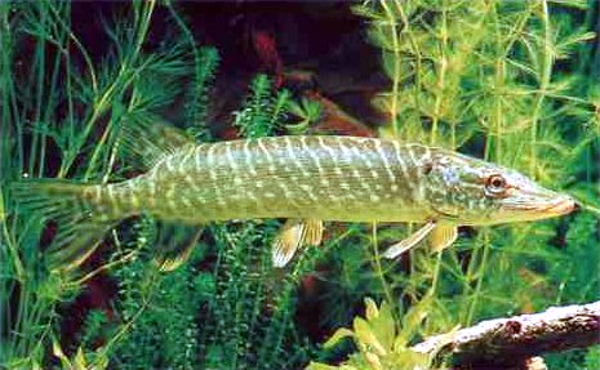
A young E. lucius specimen — a "chain pickerel" in the original sense — in an aquarium.

The generic name Esox (pike fish) derives from the Greek ἴσοξ (ee-soks, a large fish) and appears to be cognate with Celtic, Welsh eog and Irish Gaelic iasc (fish), as well as alpine Gaulic *esosk which is consistent with the original indoeuropean root for the common word for fish, *pei(k)sk. Pliny uses the Latin form Esox in reference to a large fish in the Rhine normally identified with Salmonidae (lax or salmon). Carolus Linnæus attributes Esox to the pike fish which is of similar form and appearance but taxonomically different from the salmon forms, whereas the first mention of Esox as a marine animal appears in the writings of Hesychius.

The English common name "pike" is an apparent shortening of "pike-fish", in reference to its pointed head, as the Old English word píc originally referring to a pickaxe. The plural of pike is also pike.

A Northern English and Lowland Scots name for the pike, ged, similarly derives from Old Norse gaddr (spike) (cf. the modern Swedish name for the pike, gädda, the Danish "gedde", the Norwegian "gjedde" and Scottish Gaelic: geadais). The Dutch name for the pike (snoek) has been given to a wide variety of fish reminding sailors of the pike (see snoek, snook).

The English "pike" originally referred specifically to the adult fish, the diminutive form "pickerel" (now used to name some of the smaller pike species, e.g. E. americanus and E. niger) referring to the young. The walleye (Sander vitreus) is sometimes called a pickerel or a walleyed pike, but it is unrelated to the pike, being a member of the perch family (Percidae). Pike are not to be confused with the unrelated pikeminnows of genus Ptychocheilus (family Cyprinidae) or pikeperch (Sander lucioperca) which is more akin to walleye than to pike. Pike are also called "jackfish" in North America and informally "slough shark" in Western Canada.

== Taxonomy ==
=== Evolution ===
Esox is the one of three extant members of the family Esocidae, alongside the physically dissimilar Dallia and Novumbra, the latter of which is its closest relative. Fossils of Esox-like esocids are known as far back as the Late Cretaceous in freshwater habitats of North America. Indeterminate Esox fossils are known from the Early Paleocene-aged Fort Union Formation of Montana, US and the Ravenscrag Formation of Saskatchewan, Canada, which represent the oldest records of the genus, only about 70,000 years after the Cretaceous–Paleogene extinction event. These early Esox coexisted with their older relative, the extinct Estesesox, and suggest that Esox either evolved very shortly after the extinction event, or already existed by the Late Cretaceous and immigrated to these localities shortly after the extinction event.

=== Species ===
Currently, seven recognized species are placed in this genus, within two subgenera:

Image	Subgenus	Species			
Image	Subgenus	Scientific name	Common name	Subspecies	Distribution
	Esox (pikes)	Esox aquitanicus Denys, Dettai, Persat, Hautecœur & Keith, 2014	Aquitanian pike		Charente to the Adour drainages in southwestern France
	Esox (pikes)	Esox cisalpinus Bianco & Delmastro, 2011	Southern pike		central and northern Italy, southeastern France and Switzerland, and it might also occur in western Balkans.
	Esox (pikes)	Esox lucius Linnaeus, 1758	Northern pike		Britain, Ireland, northern Europe, most of Canada, and most parts of the United States
	Esox (pikes)	Esox masquinongy Mitchill, 1824	Muskellunge	E. m. masquinongy (Great Lakes muskellunge or spotted muskellunge); E. m. ohioensis (Chautauqua muskellunge or barred muskellunge); E. m. immaculatus (clear muskellunge)	mesotrophic lakes and large rivers from northern Michigan, northern Wisconsin, and northern Minnesota through the Great Lakes region, north into Canada
	Esox (pikes)	Esox reichertii Dybowski, 1869	Amur pike		the Amur River system in Northeast Asia
	Kenoza (pickerels)	Esox americanus J. F. Gmelin, 1789	American pickerel	E. a. americanus J. F. Gmelin, 1789 (Redfin pickerel); E. a. vermiculatus Lesueur, 1846 (Grass pickerel)	the St. Lawrence drainage in Quebec, down to the Gulf Coast from Mississippi to Florida; the Great Lakes Basin from Ontario to Michigan, down to the western Gulf Coast, from East Texas to Mississippi.
	Kenoza (pickerels)	Esox niger Lesueur, 1818	Chain pickerel		southern Canada to Florida, and west to Texas. On the Atlantic Northeast in Maine, New Hampshire, New Brunswick and Nova Scotia

Hybrids between Esox masquinongy and Esox lucius are well-known and referred to as the tiger muskellunge.

==== Fossil species ====
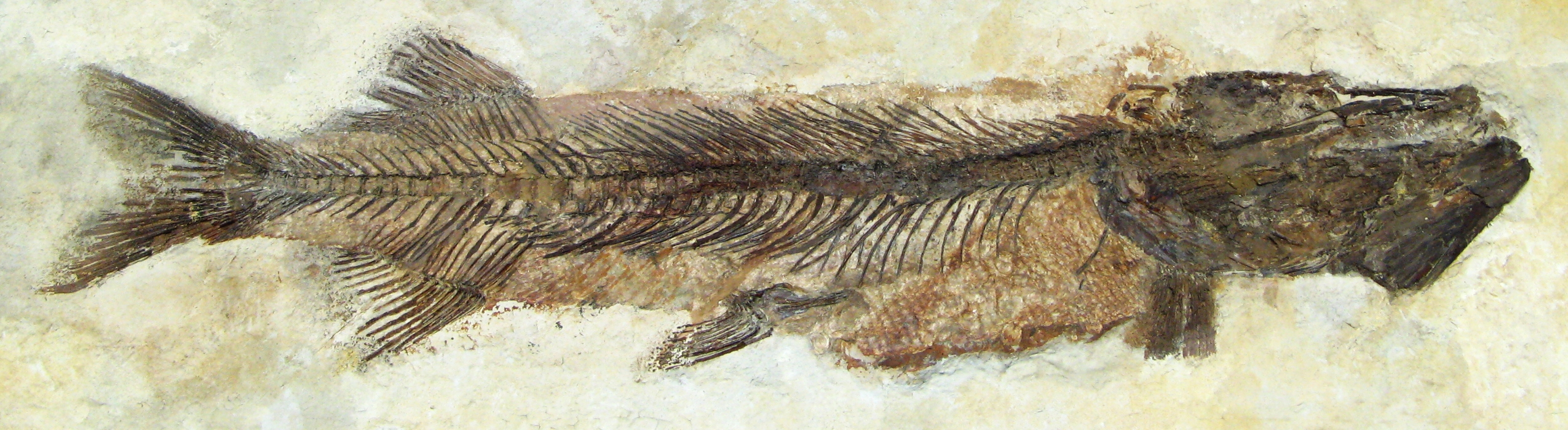
Fossil specimen of Esox lepidotus

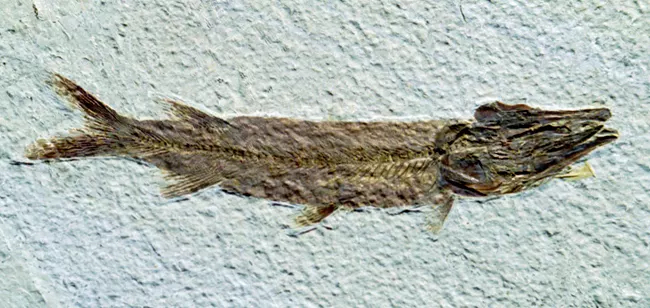
Fossil specimen of Esox kronneri, the earliest known pickerel

The following fossil species are known:

- †Esox aralensis Sytchevskaya, 1974 - Middle Oligocene of Kazakhstan
- †Esox borealis Sytchevskaya, 1976 - Late Oligocene of Omsk Oblast, Russia
- †Esox columbianus Smith, Morgan & Gustafson, 2000 - Pliocene of Washington, US (Ringold Formation)
- †Esox dispar Sytchevskaya, 1976 - Late Oligocene of Omsk Oblast, Russia
- †Esox kronneri Grande, 1999 - Early Eocene of Wyoming, US (Green River Formation)
- †Esox lepidotus Agassiz, 1844 - Late Miocene of Germany
- †Esox longkouensis Chang & Zhou, 2002 - Late Paleocene/Early Eocene of Shandong, China (Huangxian Formation)
- †Esox moldavicus Sytchevskaya, 1974 - Pliocene to Early Pleistocene of Ukraine & Moldova
- †Esox papyraceus Troschel, 1854 - Late Oligocene of Germany
- †Esox primaevus Gaudant, 1978 - Early Oligocene of France
- †Esox nogaicus Kovalchuk, Wilson & Grande, 2017 - Early Pleistocene of Ukraine
- †Esox sibiricus Sytchevskaya, 1974 - Late Miocene and early Pliocene of Ukraine, Russia (Omsk, Tuva Republic, Transbaikal), Kazakhstan & Mongolia
- †Esox tiemani Wilson, 1980 - Late Paleocene of Canada (Paskapoo Formation)

The oldest fossil species of Esox is Esox tiemani, from the late Paleocene of Canada, which differs little from modern species. Two additional fossil species, both from the Late Cretaceous of Alberta, Canada, are placed in their own genera: Estesesox foxi (Santonian to Campanian), and Oldmanesox canadensis (Campanian to Maastrichtian). Esox kronneri is one of the rarest known fish from the Eocene-aged Fossil Butte lagerstatte of Wyoming, USA. E. kronneri appears to be more closely related to the North American pickerels (subgenus Kenoza) than to the circumboreal "pike" (subgenus Esox) lineage, suggesting these two lineages diverged by the Early Eocene.

The alleged Late Cretaceous species "Esox monasteriensis" von der Marck, 1863 is thought to be an indeterminate teleost. Other fossil fish genera such as Enchodus and Platinx also had their type species be initially described under Esox.

== Diet ==
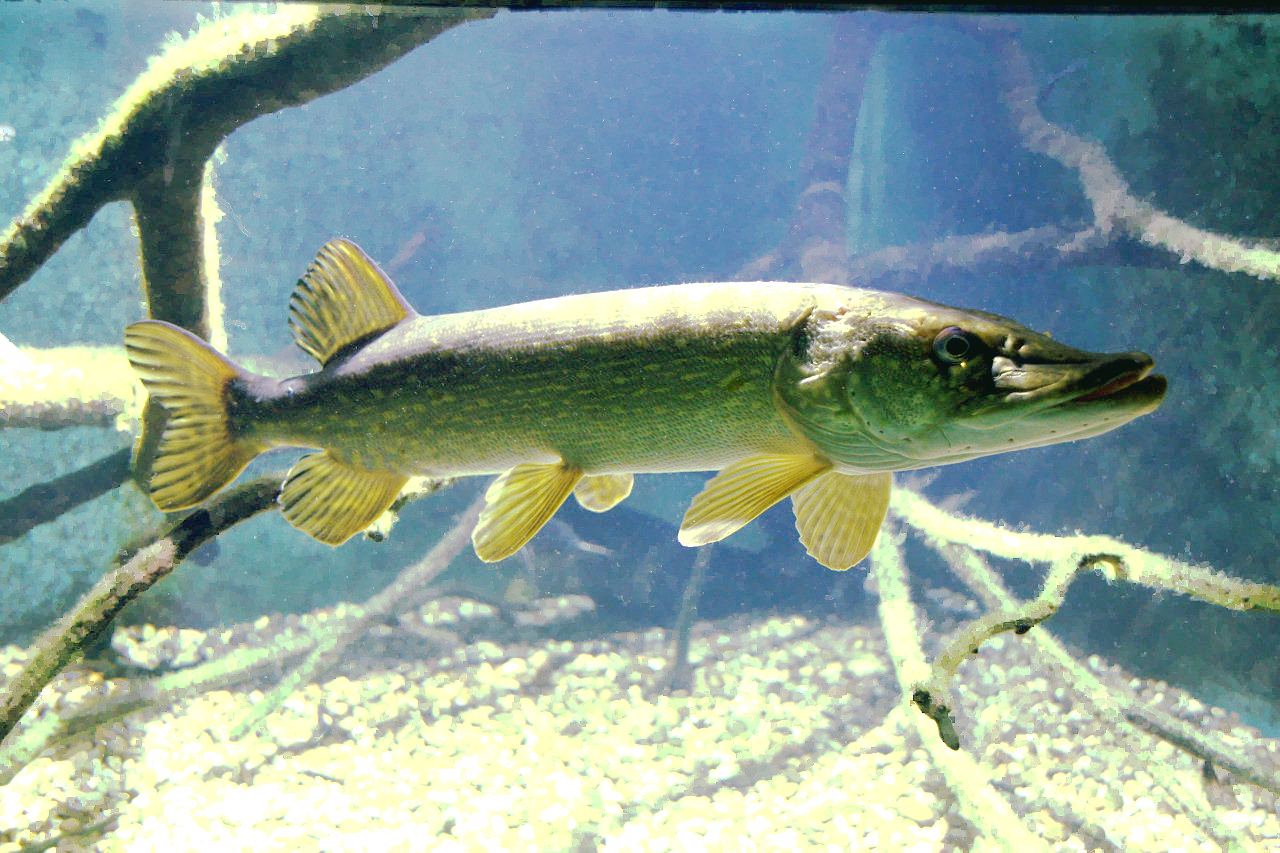
Pike in Haus des Meeres, Vienna

Pike feed on a wide range of food sources, predominantly smaller shoal fish. Pike are also cannibalistic, sometimes preying upon smaller members of their own species. This can be seen clearly in the northern pike.

They will also prey on insects and amphibians such as newts or frogs in times when their usual food is scarce, and occasionally on small mammals like moles or mice when caught water-borne. Small birds such as ducklings may become a target for hungry pike. Pike are also known to prey on swimming snakes.

They are, however, undeserving of their reputation for being overly vicious predators. There have been some incidents of pike "attacks" on people. However these are rare cases of mistaken identity, where the pike mistakes human body parts, such as fingers, for prey. Pike's further reputation as a pest seems to lie predominantly amongst a small handful of anglers and fishery managers who think that invasive species of pike are a threat to native rough fish and also other sport fish.

== Angling and handling methods ==
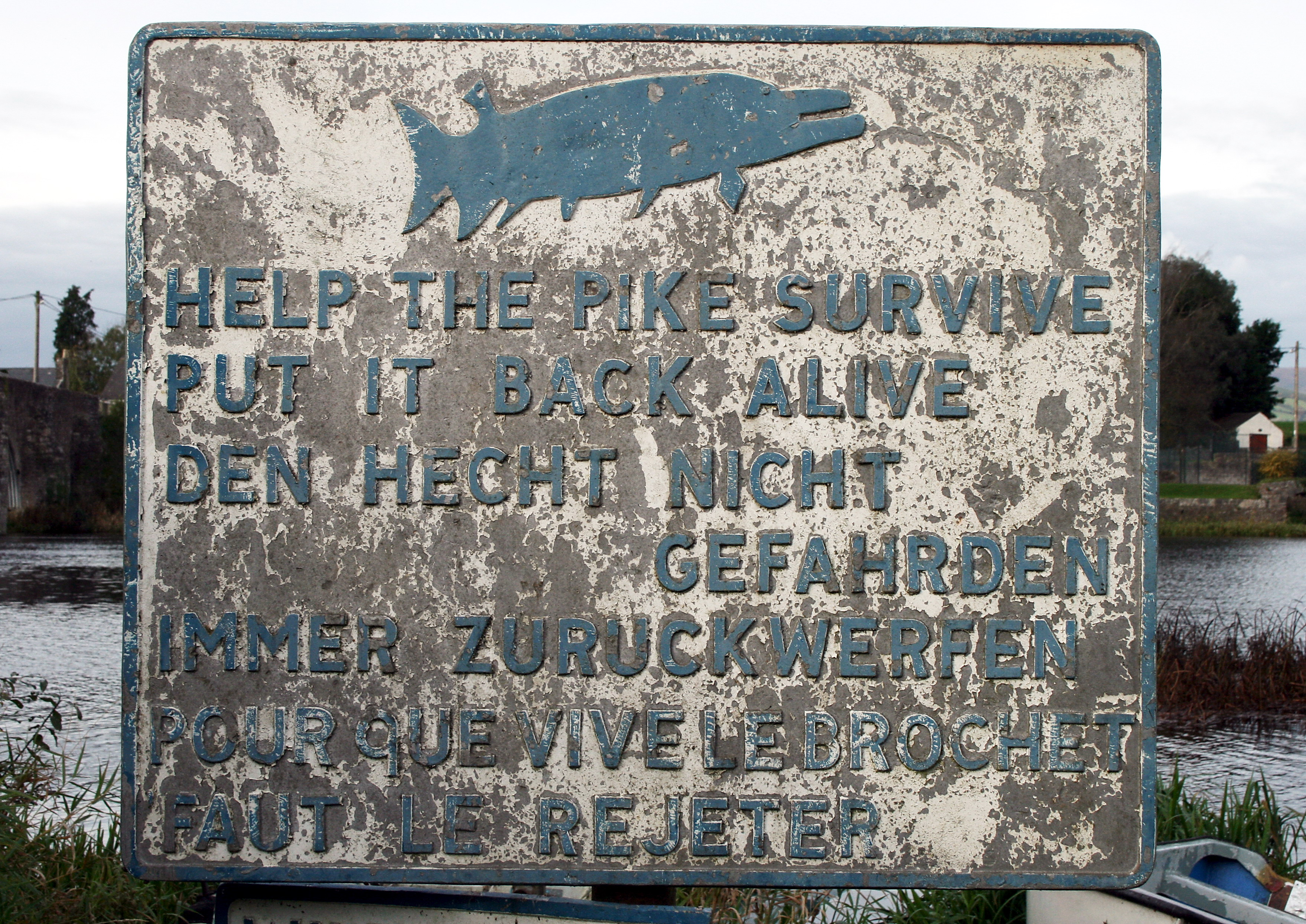
Sign on the River Shannon, Ireland

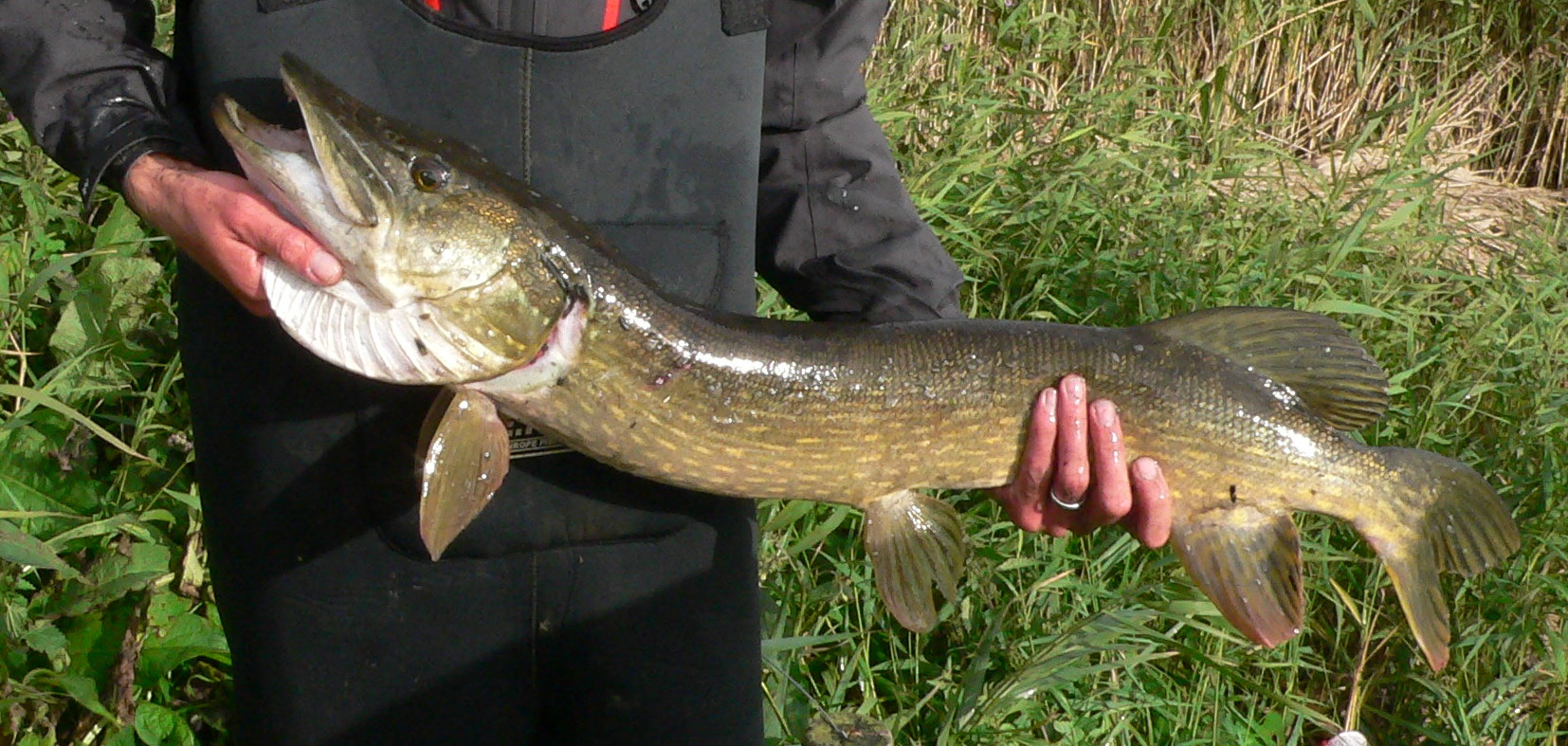
A caught pike, supported by the gill covers to prevent the fish from biting the hand of the angler who caught it

Effective methods for catching this hard-fighting fish include dead baits, live baits, and lure fishing. Pike can easily be damaged when handled since they are not as robust as their reputation would suggest and have a very sensitive slime coat. Since pike have numerous sharp teeth it is wise to take extreme care when unhooking them. The use of a wet leather gauntlet and surgical forceps to remove hooks is highly recommended on safety grounds.

If practicing catch and release fishing, care for the pike should be the pike angler's utmost concern. The formerly recommended practice of grasping a pike by its eye sockets (misinterpreted as "its eyes") resulted in numerous released pike that quickly died from the inability to see prey any longer. The current recommended method of grasping pike is to close the hand firmly over the gill covers, and to make the period of handling as short as possible before release. Grabbing a pike by the gill covers is not feasible when a pike is very big, but it is easy to handle a pike by inserting the fingers at the bottom of the gill opening and grabbing the lower jaw. Big pike should also be supported at the belly. When a pike is held this way it is also easier to keep the mouth open to remove a hook. Some anglers now use special grips to grab the pike's front lower jaw, which can add to the safety of an angler because of the danger imposed by the hooks of the lure or tackle and the pike's teeth. However, these can cause serious damage to a pike's lower jaw. The Pike Anglers Club was formed in 1977 to campaign for the preservation of pike and the sport of pike fishing.

Pike are susceptible to gut hooking when fished for with natural bait. Upon taking the bait, the pike will hold it for a short time in its mouth as it moves off. The pike will then, usually, turn the bait in its mouth, so that it sits in alignment with its throat to ease swallowing. It is recommended that when pike fishing the process is not allowed to go this far and a strike is recommended as soon as a bite is indicated. Otherwise, what is known as gut hooking will result, which will normally kill or seriously injure the fish. Dutch research shows that cutting the line immediately when the fish is gut hooked will still give low mortality (14%). The hooks in the gut or stomach were either encapsulated or removed from the body. Placing hooks near the rear of the bait reduces the risk of deep hooking. To minimize injury from gut hooking the hook should be taken out from the gills where you will insert your pliers or forceps. Grab as close to the base of the hook as you can and rotate the eye of the hook toward the bottom of the fish's mouth and be removed carefully as to not rehook the fish.

Other methods of catching and handling pike that are now frowned upon are the gaff and the gag. The gaff is a metal hook on the end of a pole used to hook through the fish's body in place of a more humane landing net. A gag is a device for holding open the pike's mouth whilst unhooking. These are now illegal in Scotland, as they put a huge amount of pressure on a pike's jaw, thus causing irreparable damage.

=== Cuisine ===
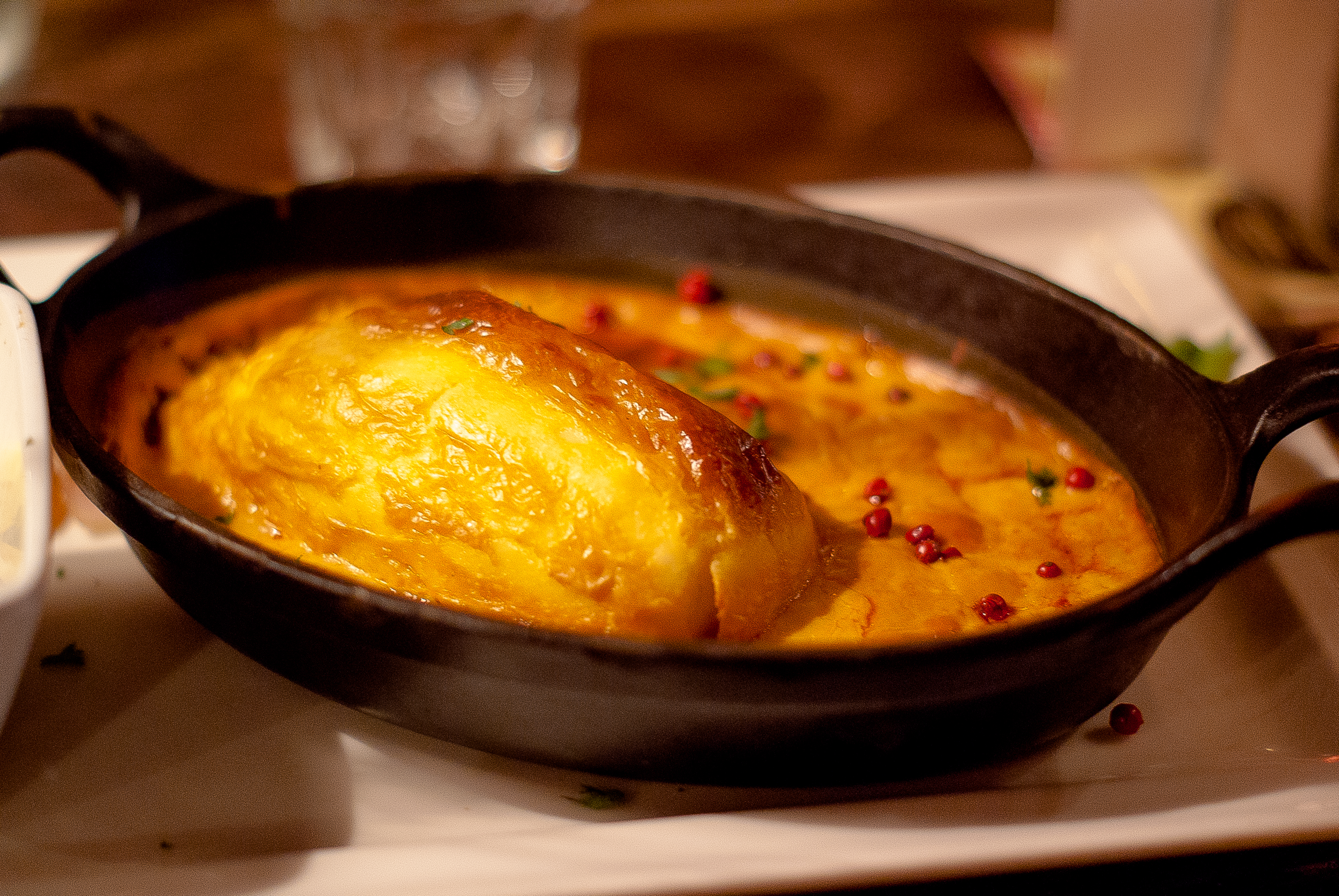
Quenelle de brochet sauce Nantua

The taste of pike and pickerel is highly esteemed, but the "multitude of long, fine, forked bones" are problematic. The dish of quenelles de brochet (pike dumplings), which puts the meat through a sieve, was invented to deal with this. Indeed, Escoffier believed, falsely, that quenelles had completely displaced the whole fish from the menu.

== Submarines and tanks ==
Two United States Navy submarines have been named Pike – SS-6 of 1903 and SS-173 of 1935 – and three – SS-22 of 1912, SS-177 of 1936, and SS-524 of 1944 – named Pickerel. In addition, the Soviet submarines known to NATO as the Victor III class and Akula class are called the Shchuka (Щука, "pike") class in Russian. The Soviet Iosif Stalin tank (IS-3) was also nicknamed Shchuka, in reference to its sharply pointed hull front.

== Cultural significance ==
=== Mythology ===
Russian mythology holds that the pike is one of several forms assumed by evil water spirits called vodyanoy, and a ravenous mythical pike is traditionally blamed for decimating the fish population in the Sheksna River. Russian fairy tales, on the other hand, also tell about an old wise pike that can fulfil wishes of the one who catches it, if its catcher releases it back into its habitat.

In the Finnish Kalevala, Väinämöinen creates a kantele (string instrument) from the jawbone of a pike.

=== Heraldry ===
In heraldry, the pike is called a lucy (English heraldry) or a ged (Scottish heraldry). It is usually blazoned either naiant (swimming), embowed (bowed) or hauriant (jumping), though pairs of lucies may appear addorsed (back to back), as in the arms of the Finnish town of Uusikaupunki (Argent, two lucies addorsed azure).

Uusikaupunki coat of arms

The canting arms of Lucie de Cockermouth: Gules, three lucies in pale argent, (2 and 1).

Coat of arms of Gimte, in Lower Saxony, Germany.

=== Literature ===
In George R. R. Martin's A Song of Ice and Fire series of epic fantasy novels, both the seat and the highborn bastards of the Iron Islands are named "Pyke", likely inspired by the pike fish since the islands are inhabited by Viking-like seafaring warriors who frequent pirate ships and raid the coastal regions.
