= Totenberg (disambiguation) =

Totenberg may refer to the following places in Germany:

hills:

- Totenberg, the highest hill in the Bramwald, Lower Saxony
- Totenberg (Vorderer Vogelsberg) (357,5 m), near Treis an der Lumda (Staufenberg), county of Gießen, Hesse
- Großer Totenberg and Kleiner Totenberg, in the Hainleite, two spurs of the Dorn (411.2 m), near Bebra (Sondershausen), Kyffhäuserkreis, Thuringia

villages:

- Totenberg (Neheim), village in the municipality of Neheim in Neheim-Hüsten (borough of Arnsberg), Hochsauerlandkreis, North Rhine-Westphalia

nature reserves:

- Totenberg (nature reserve), on the Totenberg (Bramwald), county of Göttingen, Lower Saxony; see Totenberg#Nature reserves, fauna and flora
- Totenberg (protected area), on the Totenberg (Vorderer Vogelsberg), county of Gießen, Hesse

== People ==
- Amy Totenberg (born 1950), American judge
- Nina Totenberg (born 1944), American journalist
- Roman Totenberg (1911–2012), Polish-American violinist
