= Aquitanian pike =

Conservation status
- Near Threatened (IUCN 3.1)

Scientific classification
- Kingdom: Animalia
- Phylum: Chordata
- Class: Actinopterygii
- Division: Teleostei
- Order: Salmoniformes
- Family: Esocidae
- Genus: Esox
- Species: E. aquitanicus

Binomial name
- Esox aquitanicus Denys, Dettai, Persat, Hautecœur & Keith, 2014

Species of fish

The Aquitanian pike (Esox aquitanicus) is a species of pike, a predatory fish native from the Charente to the Adour river drainages in the French Great South-West region. It was scientifically described in 2014, but had formerly been regarded as a population of the widespread northern pike (Esox lucius). The two species generally resemble each other and they are able to hybridize. This represents as threat to the relatively localized Aquitanian pike, as northern pikes commonly have been used to stock places previously only inhabited by the Aquitanian pike; historically, the two had fully separated distributions.

== Parasites ==
Like other fish, the Aquitanian pike harbours parasites, which have been relatively poorly studied. A 2026 study reported the presence of the cestode Bothriocestus claviceps.
