= Wallberg (disambiguation) =

Wallberg is a mountain in the Mangfallgebirge, in the south of Bavaria, Germany.

Wallberg may also refer to:

== People ==
- Frida Wallberg (born 1983), Swedish boxer
- Heinz Wallberg (1923–2004), German conductor
- Johan Wallberg (born 1977), Swedish freestyle swimmer
- Mats Wallberg (born 1949), Swedish speed skater

== Other uses ==
- Wallberg building, at the University of Toronto, Ontario, Canada

== See also ==
- Walburg (disambiguation)
- St. Walburg (disambiguation)
- Walberg, surname
- Wallburg (disambiguation)
- Wahlberg (disambiguation)
