= Walberg =

Walberg or Wålberg is a surname. Notable people with the surname include:

- Garry Walberg (1921–2012), American actor
- Kaare Walberg (1912–1988), Norwegian ski jumper
- Mark L. Walberg (born 1962), American actor and television personality
- Rube Walberg (1896–1978), American baseball player
- Siri Wålberg (born 1980), Norwegian musical artist
- Tim Walberg (born 1951), American politician
- Thore Wålberg (born 1953), Norwegian ice hockey player
- Vance Walberg (born 1956), American basketball player and coach
- Vicki-Lee Walberg (born 1975), English model

== See also ==
- Wahlberg (surname)
- Walburg (disambiguation), includes a list of people with surname Walburg
- Wallberg (disambiguation), includes a list of people with surname Wallberg
- Wallburg (disambiguation), includes a list of people with surname Wallburg
