= Schwülme =

River in Germany

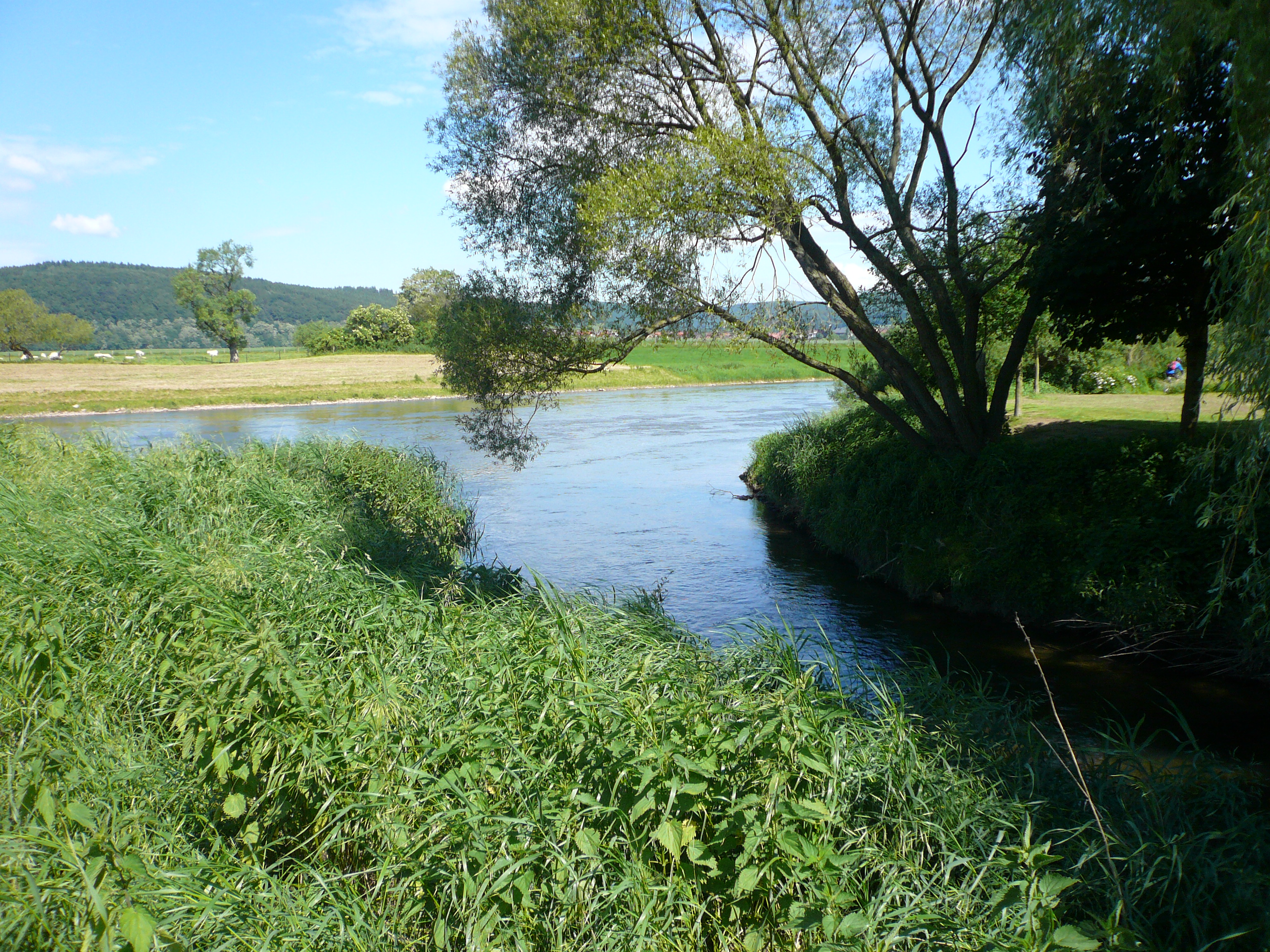
- Confluence of the Schwülme and Weser near Lippoldsberg

Location
- Country: Germany
- States: Hesse and Lower Saxony
- Reference no.: DE: 436

Physical characteristics
- Source
  - location: West of Hettensen (part of Hardegsen)
  - coordinates: 51°37′34″N 9°44′57″E
  - elevation: ca. 332 m above sea level (NN)
- Mouth
  - location: Near Lippoldsberg into the Weser
  - coordinates: 51°37′39″N 9°33′14″E
  - elevation: ca. 106 m above sea level (NN)
- Length: 32.0 km (19.9 mi)
- Basin size: 289.753 km^{2} (111.874 sq mi)

Basin features
- Progression: Weser→ North Sea

The Schwülme is a river of Lower Saxony and Hesse, Germany. It is 29 kilometres (18 mi) long and a right-hand and eastern tributary of the Weser.

== See also ==
- List of rivers of Lower Saxony
- List of rivers of Hesse
