= Wesertal =

- Municipality
- Coat of arms

- Location of Wesertal within Kassel district
- Interactive map of Wesertal
- Location within Germany Location within Hesse
- Coordinates: 51°36′N 09°36′E
- Country: Germany
- State: Hesse
- Admin. region: Kassel
- District: Kassel

Government
  - Mayor (2020–26): Cornelius Turrey (SPD)

Area
  - Total: 52.59 km^{2} (20.31 sq mi)
- Elevation: 110 m (360 ft)

Population (2025-12-31)
  - Total: 4,651
  - Density: 88.44/km^{2} (229.1/sq mi)
- Time zone: UTC+01:00 (CET)
  - Summer (DST): UTC+02:00 (CEST)
- Postal codes: 34399
- Dialling codes: 05571, 05572, 05574
- Vehicle registration: KS
- Website: www.gemeinde-wesertal.de

Wesertal (German pronunciation: [ˈveːzɐtaːl], lit. 'Weser Valley') is a municipality in the district of Kassel, in Hesse, Germany. It was created with effect from 1 January 2020 by the merger of the former municipalities of Wahlsburg and Oberweser. It takes its name from the river Weser, that flows through the municipality.
