= Nieme =

River in Germany

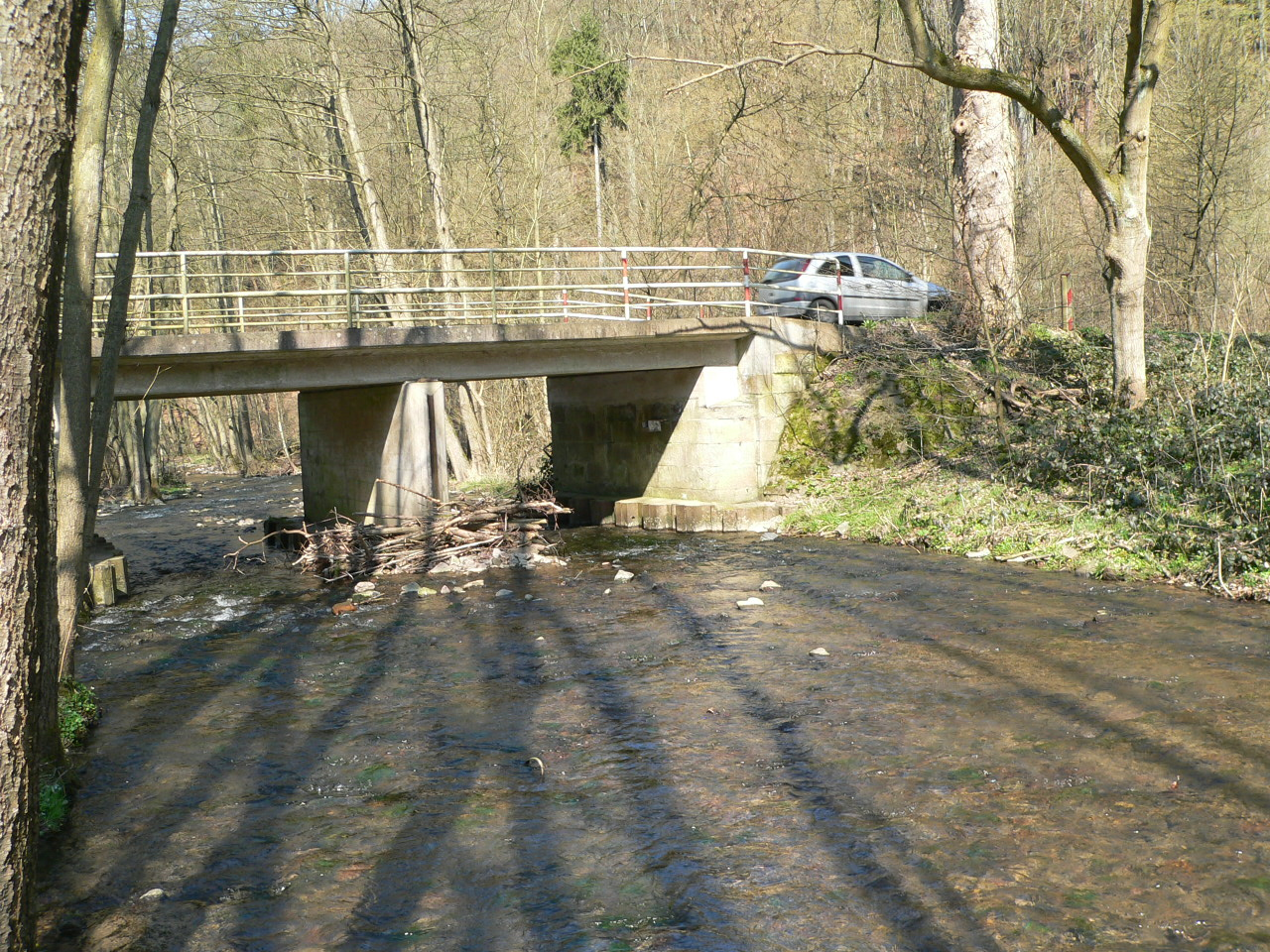

Location
- Country: Germany
- State: Lower Saxony

Physical characteristics
- Mouth
  - location: Weser
  - coordinates: 51.5407°N 9.6223°E
- Length: 16.7 km (10.4 mi)

Basin features
- Progression: Weser→ North Sea

Nieme is a river in Lower Saxony, Germany that flows into the Weser in Bursfelde.

== See also ==
- List of rivers of Lower Saxony
