= Karin Wahlberg =

Swedish obstetrician and author (born 1950)

Karin Wahlberg (born 1950 in Kalmar, Sweden) is a Swedish obstetrician and author. She is most famous for her crime series about Criminal Inspector Claes Claesson and his wife Veronika Lundborg, chief physician at Oskarshamn Hospital. In 2012 her authorship was introduced to America. Her work has been likened to the traditional detective fiction of Agatha Christie.

== Bibliography ==
- (2001) Sista jouren
- (2002) Hon som tittade in
- (2003) Ett fruset liv
- (2004) Flickan med majblommorna
- (2006) Blocket
- (2007) Tröstaren
- (2009) Sigrids hemlighet
- (2009) Matthandlare Olssons död
- (2009) Camilla och lögnen
- (2010) Camilla och Micke
- (2011) Glasklart

In English

- (2012) Death of a Carpet Dealer
