= Gimte =

Coordinates: 51°26′N 9°39′E

Gimte coat of arms.

Gimte is a village in the municipality of Hann. Münden, Lower Saxony, Germany, with a population of 2150 (as of December 2007) and an area of 5.01 km². The local mayor (Ortsbürgermeister) of Gimte is Peter Kazwinkel (SPD).

== Location ==
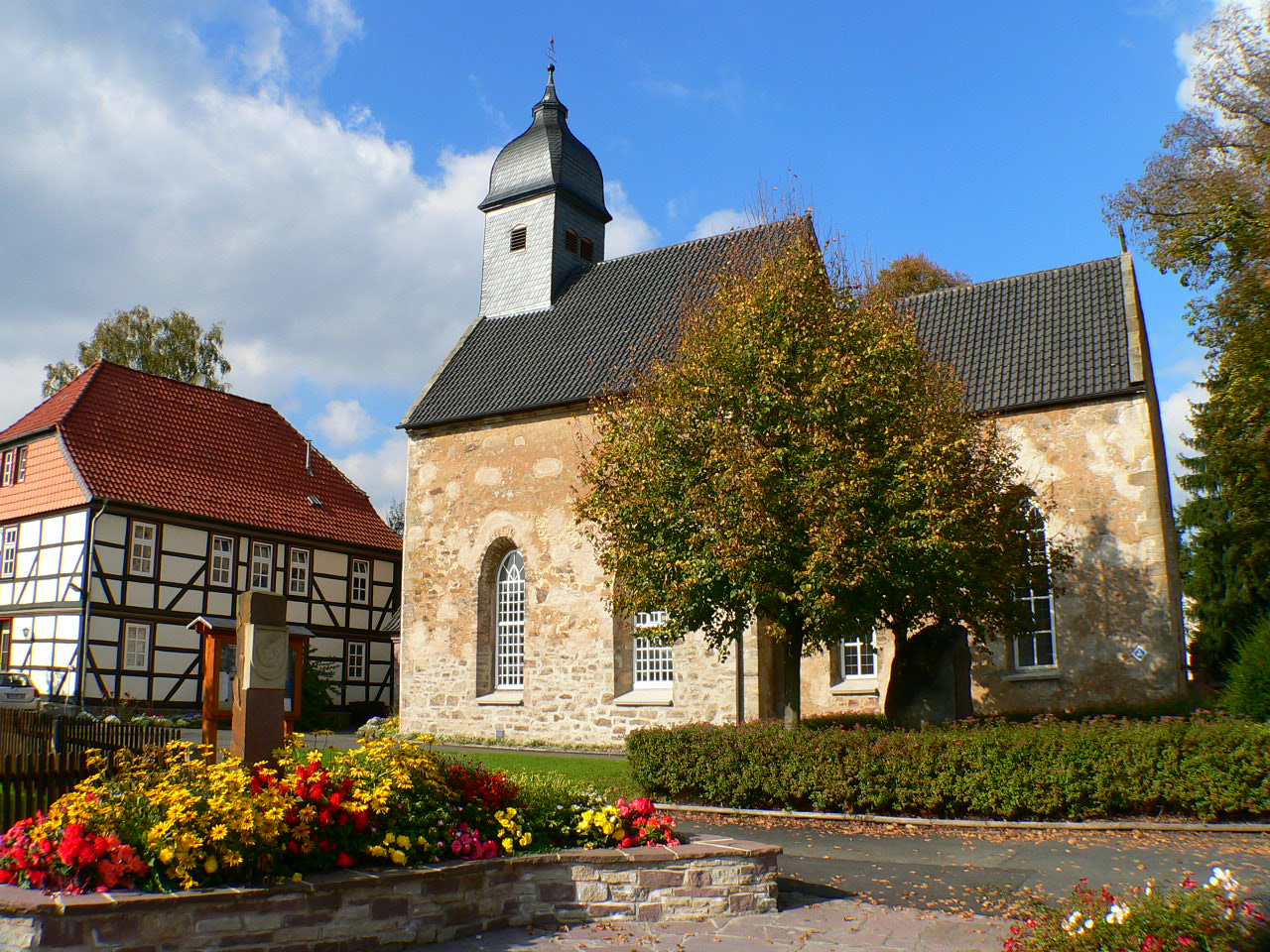
The Marienkirche church in Gimte.

Gimte is located to the right of the Weser stream in the Weser Valley, between Bramwald in the east and Reinhardswald in the west. The monastery area of Hilwartshausen is part of the area.

The village of Gimte can be reached by the highway B3 in the direction of Hann. Münden, Kassel and Göttingen, or by the highway L561 in the direction of Hemeln and Oberweser. The Weser Cycle Path bicycle route passes through the village.

The village of Gimte includes a hotel, a restaurant, a kiosk, a driving school, a bakery and a grocery.

== History ==
Gimte was founded in 970 as Gemmet and was the site of the Hilwartshausen monastery. The Marien-Kirche church, founded in 1006, celebrated its 1000th anniversary in 2007. Until the 1960s, timber rafting and fishing on the Weser was a major source of income in Gimte. Further sources of income include wood industry and processing of linen.

== Culture ==
Gimte is a twin community of Sannois, in Paris, France.

== Sport ==
There are two sports teams in the village: TuSpo "Weser" Gimte and 1. FC Gimte. TuSpo was founded in 1919 and 1. FC in 1994. TuSpo has activities in football, badminton, table tennis, children's sports, gymnastics and various free-time sports activities. 1. FC is active in football, ESDO and volleyball.
