= Marek Walburg =

Polish footballer (born 1976)

Personal information
- Date of birth: 16 September 1976 (age 50)
- Place of birth: Szczecin, Poland
- Height: 1.86 m (6 ft 1 in)
- Position: Defender

Senior career*
| Years | Team | Apps | (Gls) |
| 1993–2003 | Pogoń Szczecin | 77 | (1) |
| 1996 | → Błękitni Stargard Szczeciński (loan) | | |
| 1996–1997 | → Chemik Police (loan) | | |
| 2003–2004 | Widzew Łódź | 21 | (0) |
| 2005 | B 93 | 0 | (0) |
| 2006 | Świt Nowy Dwór | 12 | (1) |
| 2007–2008 | Pogoń Szczecin | | |
| 2011 | Victoria 95 Przecław | | |
- * Club domestic league appearances and goals

Marek Walburg (born 16 September 1976) is a Polish former professional footballer who played as a defender.

== Honours ==
Pogoń Szczecin

- IV liga West Pomerania: 2007–08
