= Niemetal =

- Municipality
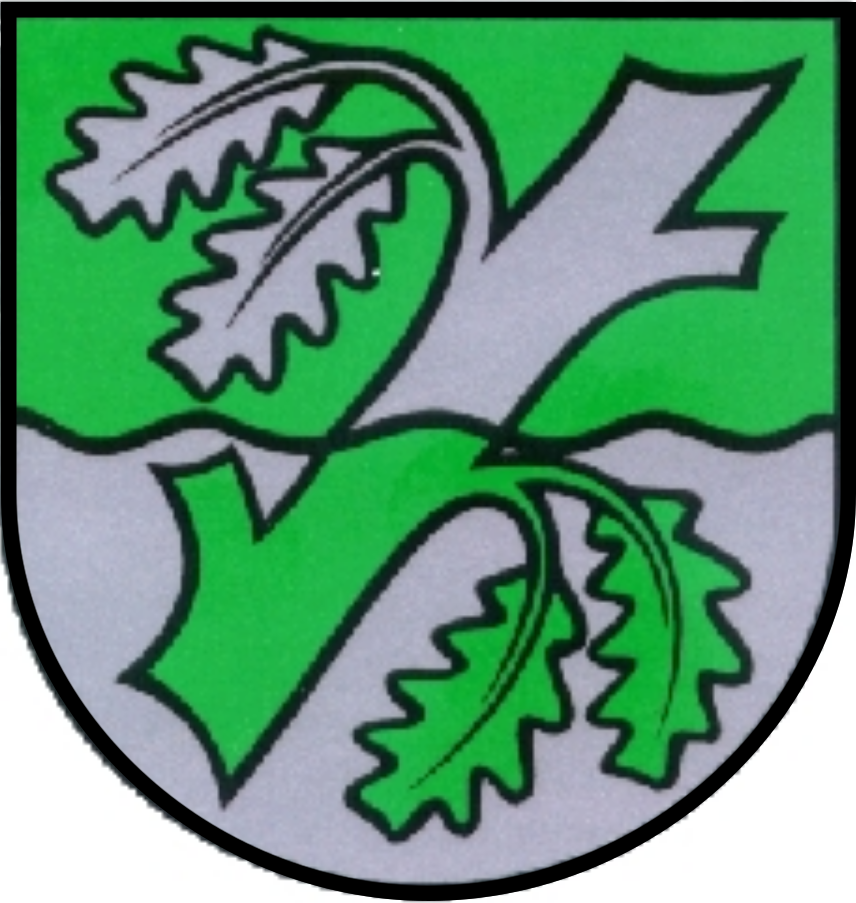
- Flag Coat of arms

- Location of Niemetal within Göttingen district
- Interactive map of Niemetal
- Location within Germany Location within Lower Saxony
- Coordinates: 51°30′N 09°43′E
- Country: Germany
- State: Lower Saxony
- District: Göttingen
- Municipal assoc.: Dransfeld

Government
  - Mayor: Gerold Schäfer

Area
  - Total: 28.5 km^{2} (11.0 sq mi)
- Elevation: 279 m (915 ft)

Population (2025-12-31)
  - Total: 1,398
  - Density: 49.1/km^{2} (127/sq mi)
- Time zone: UTC+01:00 (CET)
  - Summer (DST): UTC+02:00 (CEST)
- Postal codes: 37127
- Dialling codes: 05502
- Vehicle registration: GÖ
- Website: www.Niemetal.de

Niemetal is a municipality in the district of Göttingen, in Lower Saxony, Germany.
