= Oberweser =

- Municipality
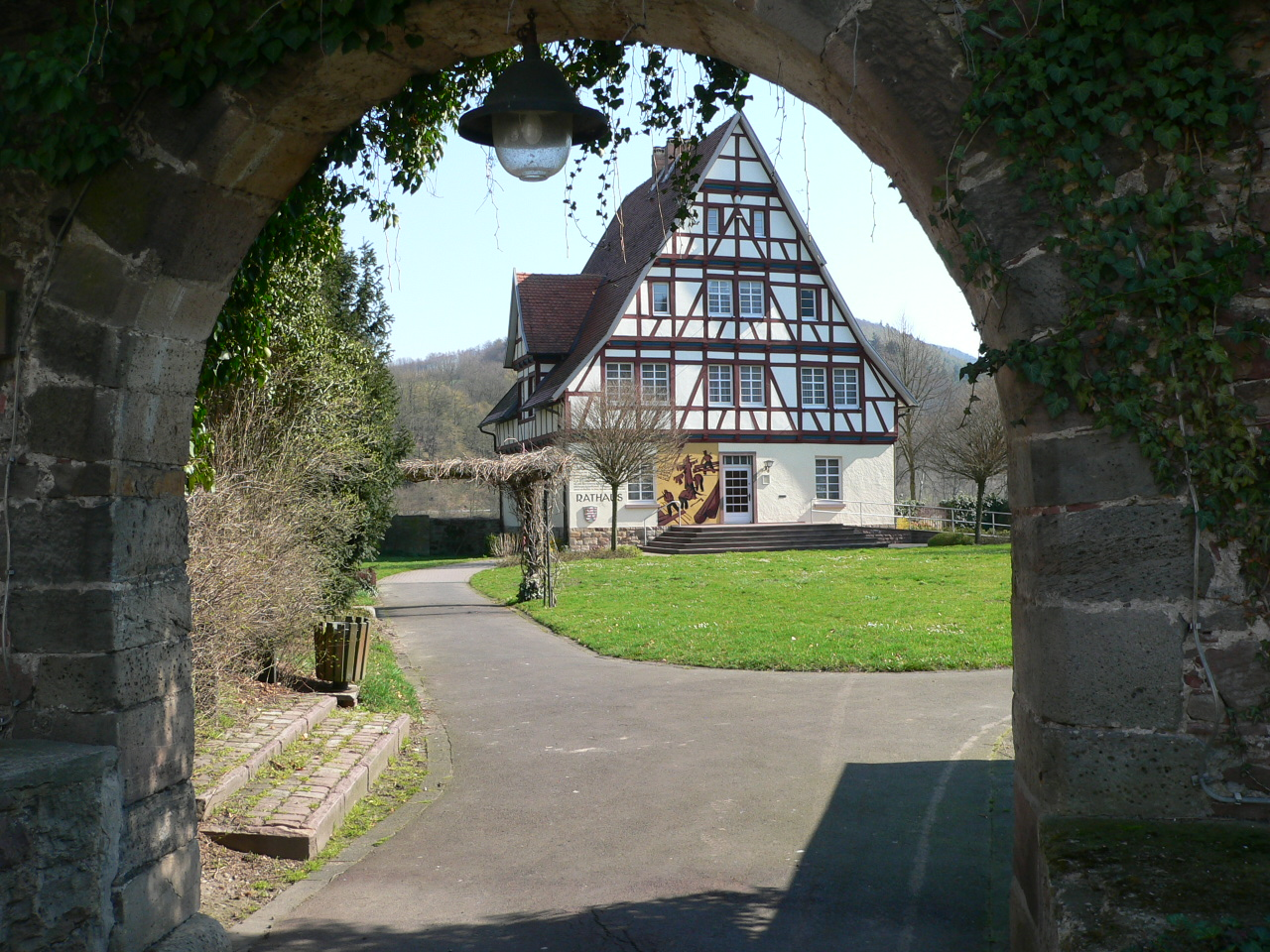
- Town hall

- Coat of arms
- Interactive map of Oberweser
- Location within Germany Location within Hesse
- Coordinates: 51°35′N 09°34′E
- Country: Germany
- State: Hesse
- Admin. region: Kassel
- District: Kassel
- Disbanded: 2020

Area
  - Total: 41.17 km^{2} (15.90 sq mi)
- Elevation: 121 m (397 ft)

Population (2018-12-31)
  - Total: 3,158
  - Density: 76.71/km^{2} (198.7/sq mi)
- Time zone: UTC+01:00 (CET)
  - Summer (DST): UTC+02:00 (CEST)
- Postal codes: 34399
- Dialling codes: 05572 and 05574
- Vehicle registration: KS
- Website: www.oberweser.de

Oberweser (German pronunciation: [ˈoːbɐveːzɐ], lit. 'Upper Weser') was a municipality in the district of Kassel, in Hesse, Germany. It was located 32 kilometres (20 miles) north of Kassel and 27 kilometres (17 miles) northwest of Göttingen. On January 1, 2020, Oberweser merged with neighboring Wahlsburg to form the municipality of Wesertal.
