= Nieste (river) =

River in Germany

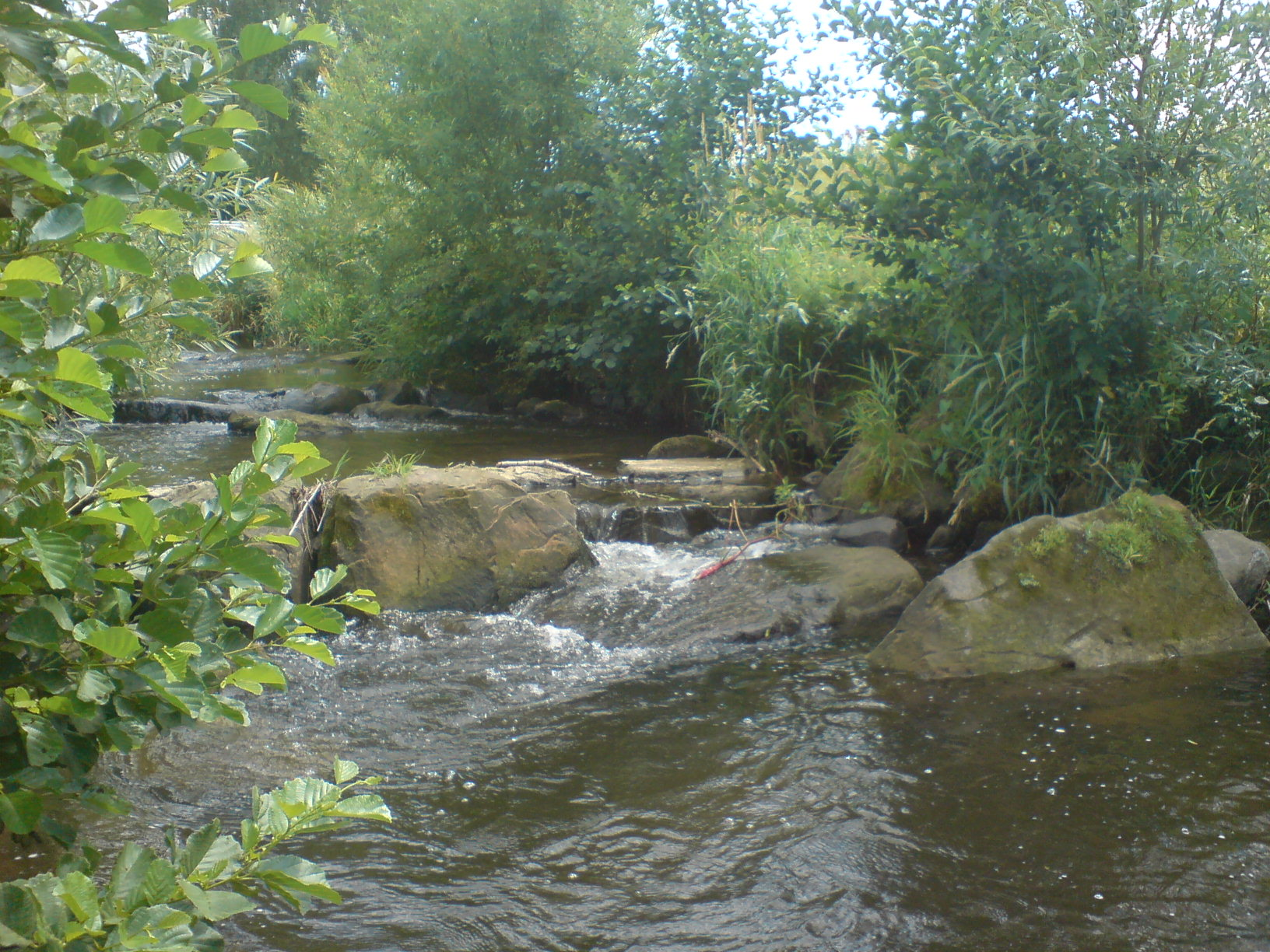

Location
- Country: Germany
- State: Hesse, Lower Saxony

Physical characteristics
- Mouth
  - location: Fulda
  - coordinates: 51.3234°N 9.5412°E
- Length: 21.7 km (13.5 mi)

Basin features
- Progression: Fulda→ Weser→ North Sea

Nieste is a river of Hesse and of Lower Saxony, Germany. It flows into the Fulda in Niestetal.

== See also ==
- List of rivers of Hesse
- List of rivers of Lower Saxony
