= Bursfelde =

Coordinates: 51°32′N 9°38′E

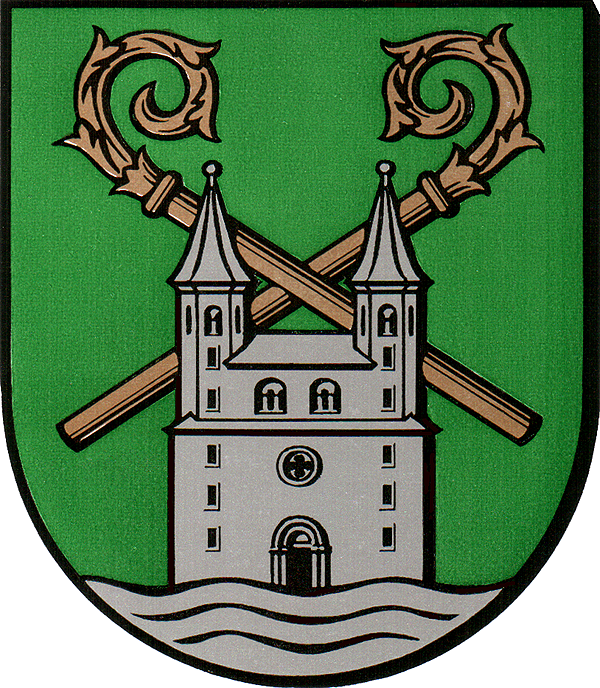
Seal

Bursfelde is a village, now administratively joined with Hemeln as Bursfelde-Hemeln, in the northern part of Hann. Münden in the district of Göttingen, Lower Saxony, Germany.

As of 2021, there are 28 people living in this village.

The village lies on the east side of the Weser River. It is best known for its Bursfelde Abbey.
