= South Lower Saxony =

Southern part of the German federal state of Lower Saxony

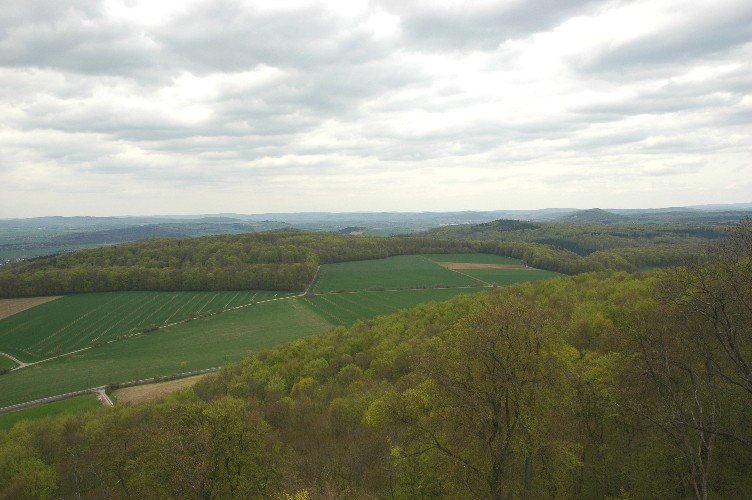
Leine Uplands

South Lower Saxony (German: Südniedersachsen) refers to the southern part of the German federal state of Lower Saxony. The region so described is neither historically nor geographically clearly defined to the north within Lower Saxony. It cuts across the more obviously delineated natural regions of the Weser Uplands, Leine valley, Leine Uplands and the western parts of the Harz mountains as well as the western part of the historical region of Eichsfeld.

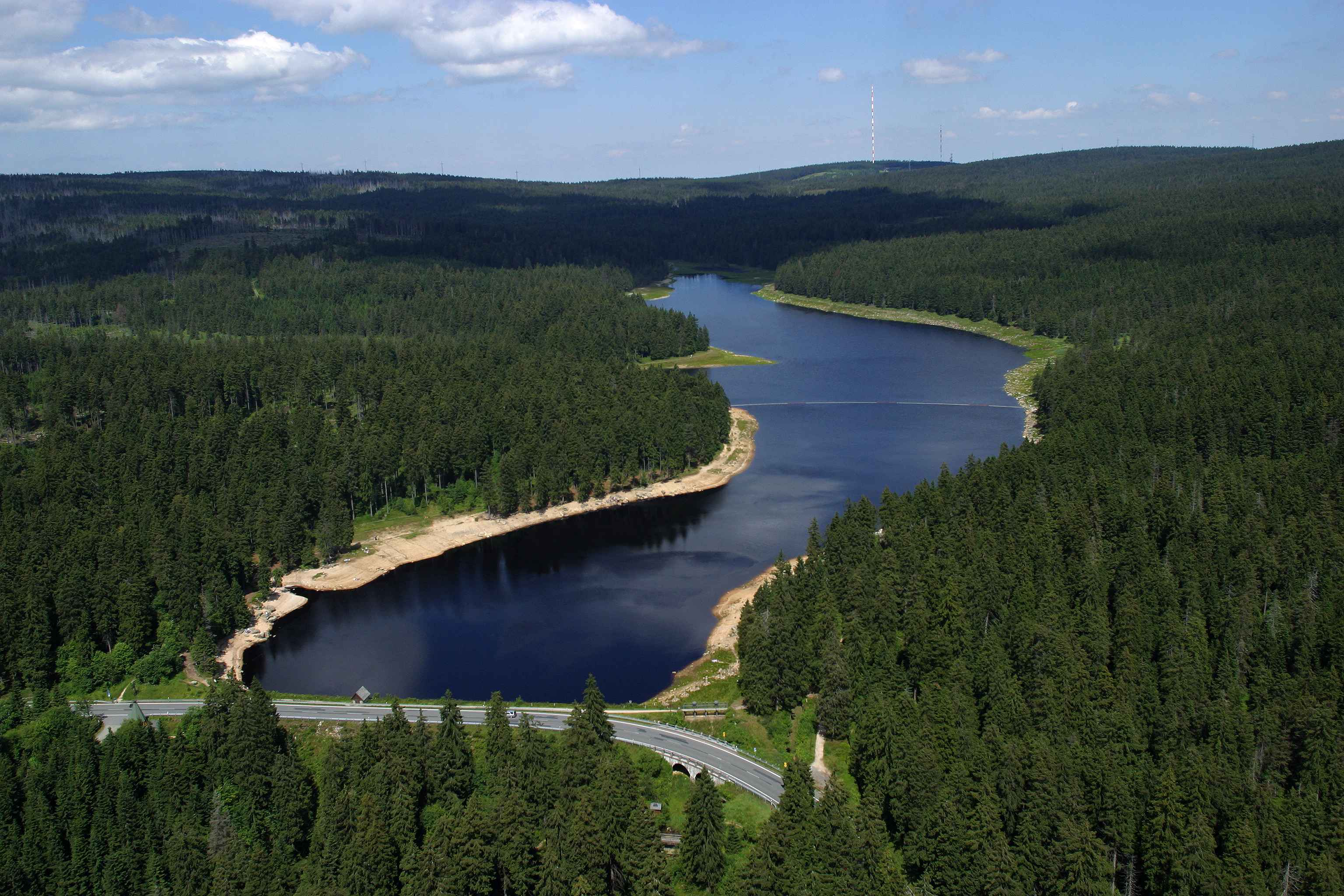
Lake in the Harz mountains, part of UNESCO World Heritage Site, the Upper Harz Water Regale

The districts of Göttingen and Northeim are counted as being within South Lower Saxony, as are those of Holzminden and Goslar, depending on the context. The only regional centre is the university city of Göttingen.

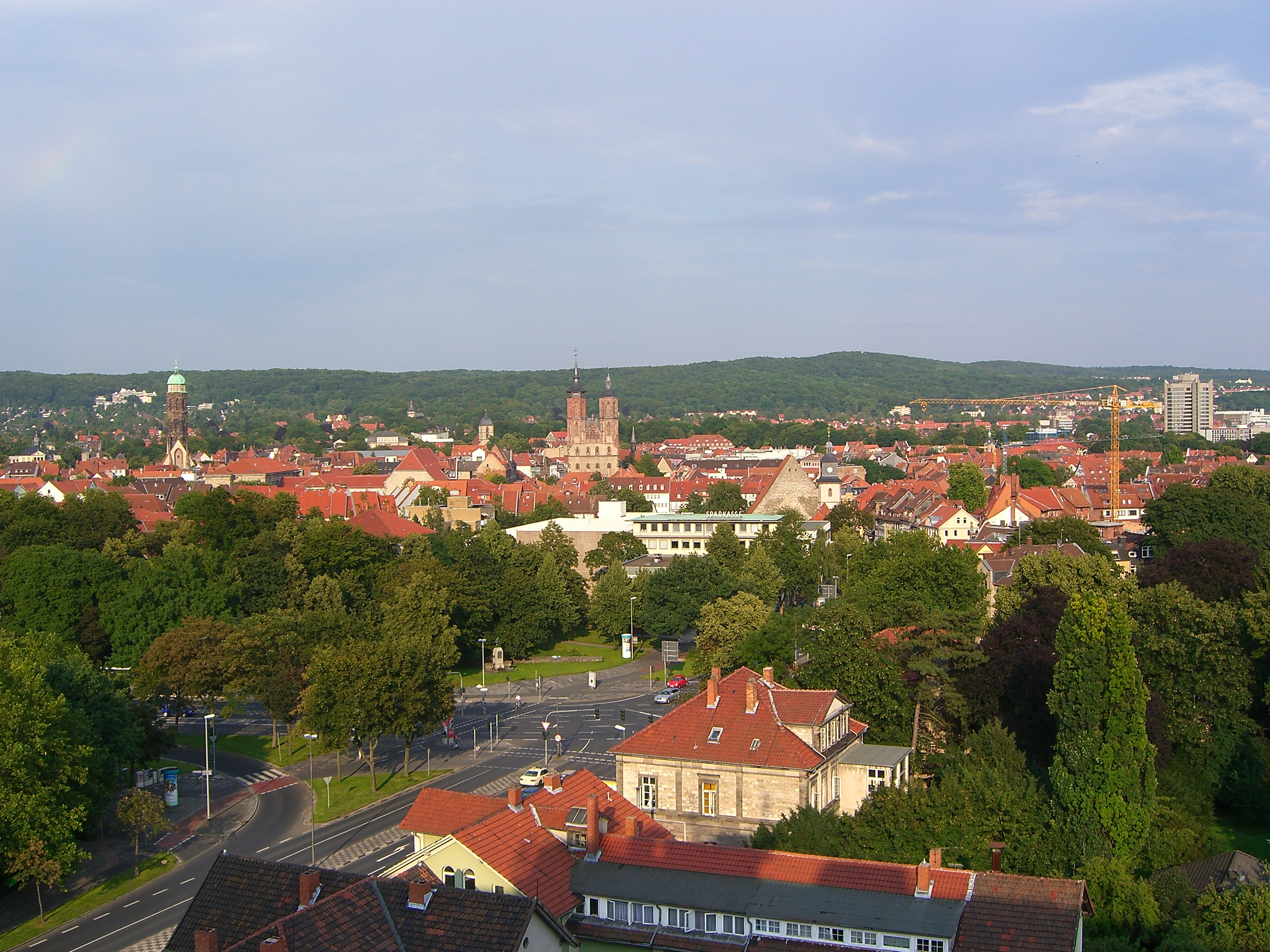
Göttingen

Its current significance lies in the fact that a number of institutions bear the name; these are mainly those to do with communal cooperation, e. g. the South Lower Saxony Transport System Administration Union (Zweckverband Verkehrsverbund Süd-Niedersachsen or ZVSN). The South Lower Saxony Transport System (Verkehrsverbund Süd-Niedersachsen or VSN), which covers the districts of Göttingen, Holzminden, Northeim and Osterode am Harz, brings together the bus and rail companies as well as public transport divisions. The South Lower Saxony Regional Association (Landschaftsverband Südniedersachsen) deals with cultural issues. In the wake of the disbandment of regional administrations (Bezirksregierungen) in 2005 important functions to do with the promotion of regional culture were transferred to it by the state of Lower Saxony. The South Lower Saxony Foundation (Südniedersachsenstiftung) acts as an independent and party-politically neutral network coordinator, which advances the South Lower Saxony region as a whole in terms of economic, cultural and social development and growth.

== Cultural history ==
Until the Middle Ages the hilly terrain between the Weser and the Harz belonged to the heartlands of the Holy Roman Empire. After that, it suffered for several centuries from battles over its political domination. As a result, it became a political fringe region. Numerous cultural treasures have been preserved, that have only partially been opened up to tourism.
