= Hemeln =

Coordinates: 51°30′N 9°37′E

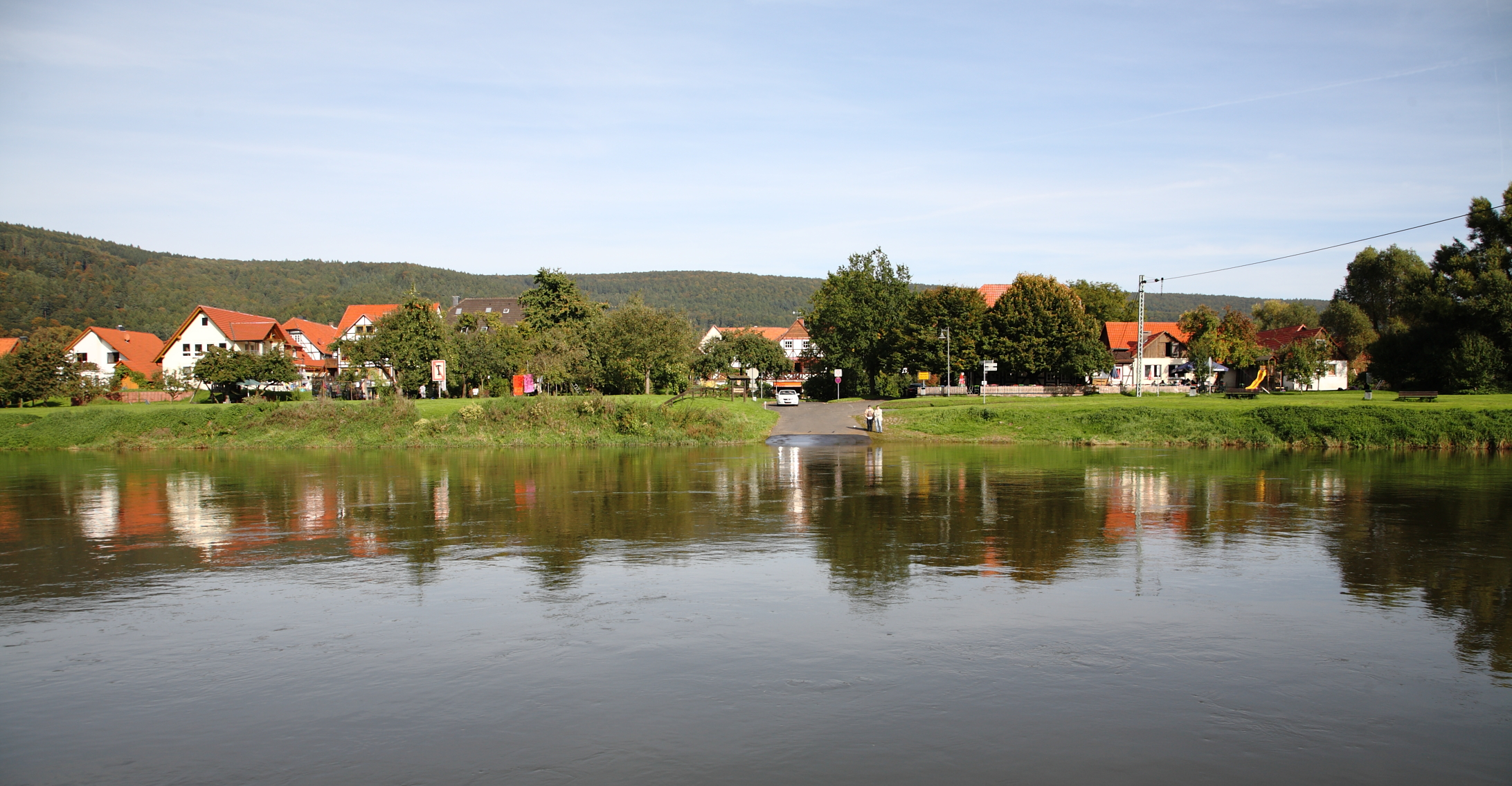
Hemeln

Hemeln is an outlying village (Ortsteil) in the borough of the town of Hann. Münden. It lies on the right bank of the Weser River, 12 km from the city proper. The highways L561 and L560 run through the community. Its population of some 960 includes those of the two neighbouring villages, Glashütte (100 residents) and Bursfelde (40). As of 2009, the village mayor is Alfred Urhahn.

Hemeln has numerous social and service organizations, a kindergarten and a grammar school.

There are a few inns for food and lodging. Since the village is not too far from Goettingen, it is a popular outing place for the university's students.

The earliest known name reference to Hemeln is in 834, the year in which Frankish emperor Ludwig ceded Hemeln to the Corvey Abbey.

In 1342 Hemeln was severely flooded, and again in May 1943, this time due to RAF bombing and destruction of the Edersee dam.

The village church was built in 1681 as a replacement for a smaller one dating to 1175 and destroyed in the Thirty Years' War. The steeple dates from around the beginning of the 13th century, when it served as a watchtower. There is also an abbey church in Bursfelde.

Since at least 1342, Hemeln has been connected by the Veckerhagen Ferry (Fähre Hemeln - Veckerhagen) to the larger village of Veckerhagen in northern Hesse directly across the river. Today the ferry serves automotive, bicycle, and foot traffic.

== Reference material ==
- Willi Osenbrück, Hemeln 834–1984. Beiträge zur Geschichte eines Oberweserdorfes. 1984, 443 pp.
- Heinz Potthast, Beispiele zum Werden einer Kulturlandschaft im Raum Hemeln-Bursfelde. Flurnamen, alte Wege, Wüstungen. Sydekum-Schriften zur Geschichte der Stadt Münden 9. Münden 1984
- Walter Henckel, Am Weserradweg bei Hemeln. Auf Entdeckungstour zwischen Hannoversch Münden und Bursfelde. E.g. Kultur- und Naturförderverein Hemeln e. V., Husum Verlag, Husum 2007
