= St. Walburg (disambiguation) =

Saint Walburg, St. Walburg or variants thereof, may refer to:

- Saint Walpurga (c. 710–777 or 779), Anglo-Saxon missionary and saint
- St. Walburg, Saskatchewan, a town in Canada
- St. Walburg Monastery, Villa Hills, Kentucky, United States - see Benedictine Sisters of St. Walburg Monastery
- St. Walburg, Tiel, Netherlands, a collegiate church that vanished after the Protestant Reformation

== See also ==
- St. Walburg's Hospital, Nyangao, Tanzania
- Santa Valburga, a subdivision of Ulten, Italy
- Walburg (disambiguation)
