= Reinhardshagen =

Municipality in Hesse, Germany

- Municipality
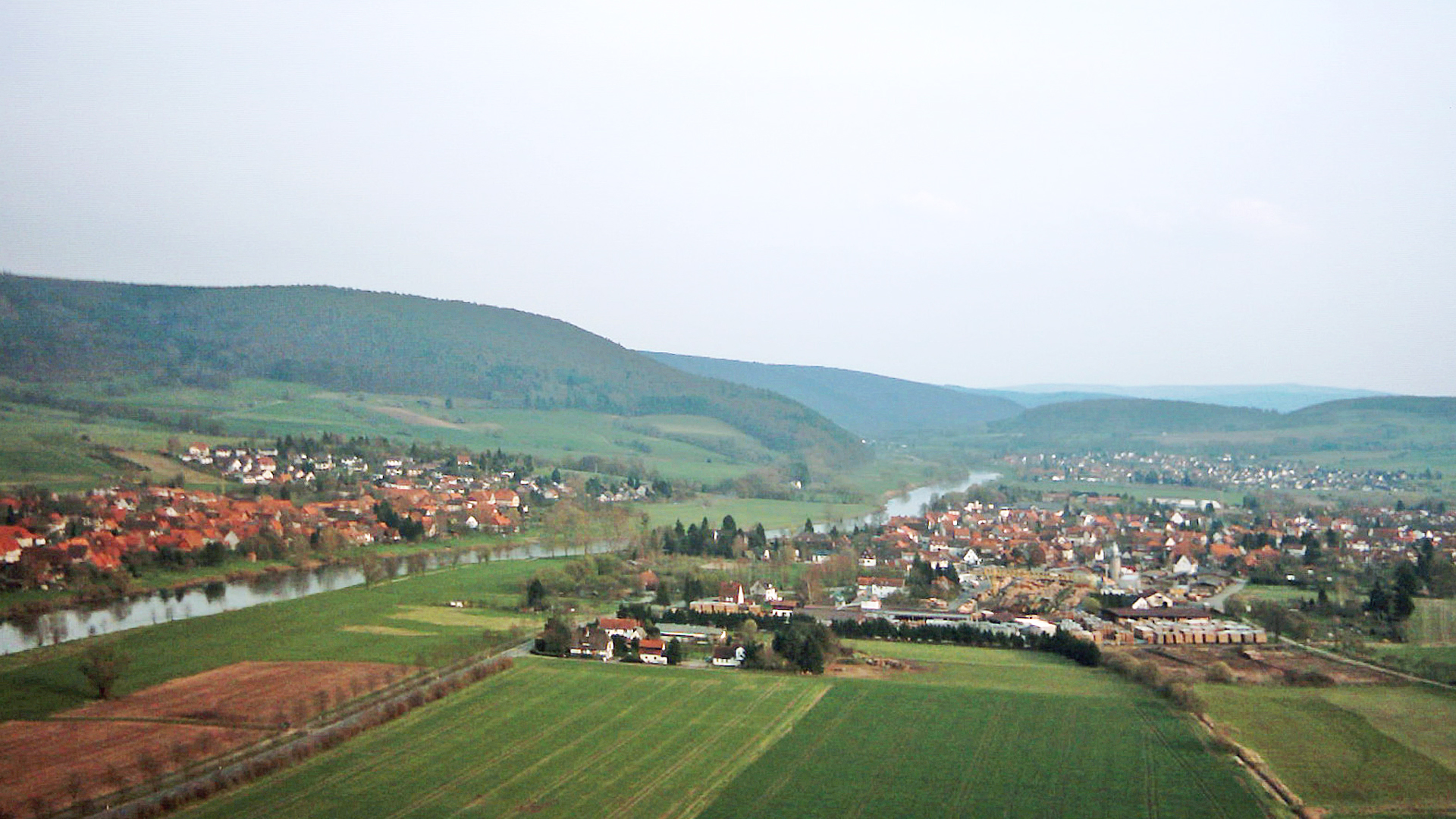
- Reinhardshagen

- Coat of arms

- Location of Reinhardshagen within Kassel district
- Interactive map of Reinhardshagen
- Location within Germany Location within Hesse
- Coordinates: 51°29′N 09°36′E
- Country: Germany
- State: Hesse
- Admin. region: Kassel
- District: Kassel

Government
  - Mayor (2020–26): Fred Dettmar

Area
  - Total: 12.99 km^{2} (5.02 sq mi)
- Elevation: 159–472 m (522–1,549 ft)

Population (2025-12-31)
  - Total: 4,265
  - Density: 328.3/km^{2} (850.4/sq mi)
- Time zone: UTC+01:00 (CET)
  - Summer (DST): UTC+02:00 (CEST)
- Postal codes: 34359
- Dialling codes: 05544
- Vehicle registration: KS
- Website: www.reinhardshagen.de

Reinhardshagen is a municipality in the district of Kassel, in Hesse, Germany. It is located 24 kilometers north of Kassel, and 21 kilometers west of Göttingen.
