= Wahlsburg =

- Municipality
- Flag Coat of arms
- Interactive map of Wahlsburg
- Location within Germany Location within Hesse
- Coordinates: 51°38′N 09°36′E
- Country: Germany
- State: Hesse
- Admin. region: Kassel
- District: Kassel
- Disbanded: 2020

Area
  - Total: 11.47 km^{2} (4.43 sq mi)
- Elevation: 147 m (482 ft)

Population (2018-12-31)
  - Total: 2,044
  - Density: 178.2/km^{2} (461.5/sq mi)
- Time zone: UTC+01:00 (CET)
  - Summer (DST): UTC+02:00 (CEST)
- Postal codes: 37194
- Dialling codes: 05572, 05571
- Vehicle registration: KS, HOG, WOH
- Website: www.wahlsburg.de

Wahlsburg (German pronunciation: [ˈvaːlsbʊʁk]) was a municipality in the district of Kassel, in Hesse, Germany. It consisted of the two parts Lippoldsberg and Vernawahlshausen, and was located 36 kilometres (22 mi) north of Kassel and 28 kilometres (17 mi) northwest of Göttingen. On January 1, 2020, Wahlsburg merged with neighboring Oberweser to form the municipality of Wesertal.
