= Göttingen Forest =

Hill ridge in Germany

Coordinates: 51°32′41″N 10°01′12″E

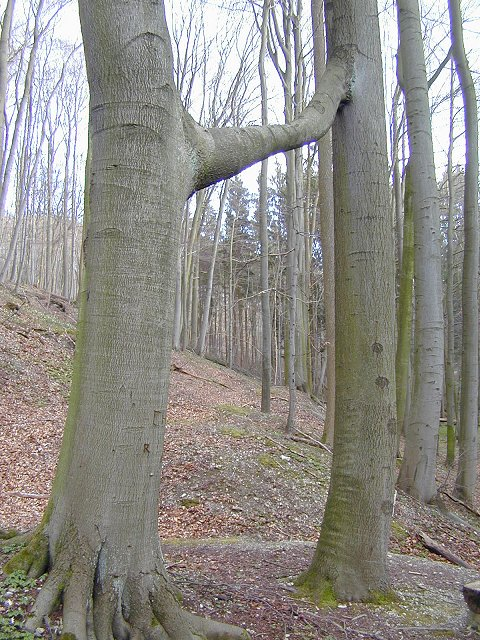
The Geschwisterbuche beech trees are an unusual sight in the Göttingen Forest

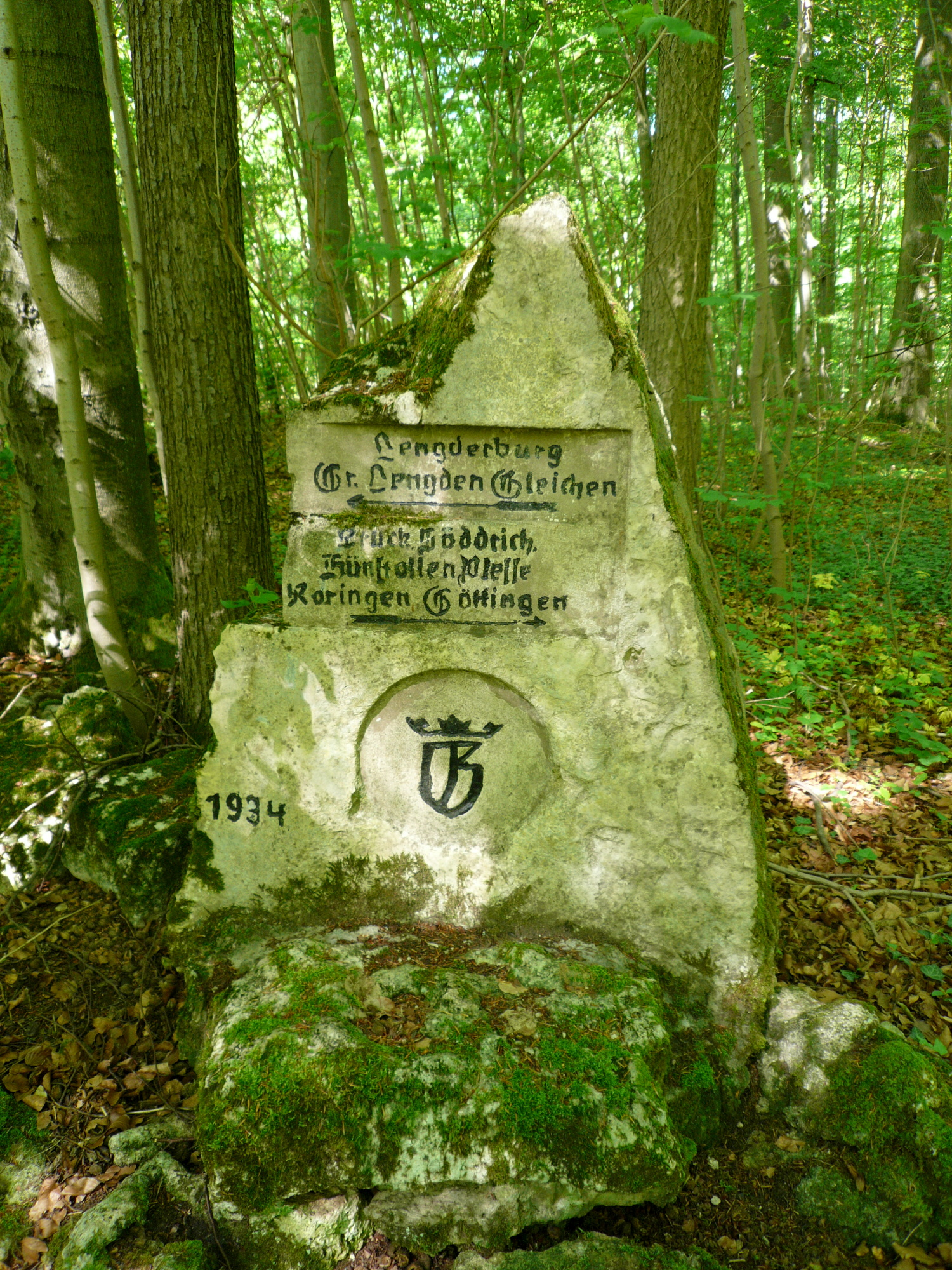
Old signpost in the Göttingen Forest

The Göttingen Forest (German: Göttinger Wald) is a ridge in Germany's Central Uplands that is up to 427.5 metres high. It forms part of the Lower Saxon Hills in South Lower Saxony.

== Geography ==
The Göttingen Forest, which is divided into numerous separate woods, is found in the south of the Leine Uplands, which is in turn part of the Lower Saxon Hills. It lies in the district of Göttingen east of the city of Göttingen itself, immediately south of the Nörten Forest, west of the Untereichsfeld and north of the Reinhausen Forest with its twin peaks, Die Gleichen. The Göttingen Forest, Nörten Forest and Reinhausen Forest each form part of the Göttingen-Northeim Forest. Several kilometres to the northeast is the ridge of Rotenberg and, beyond that, the Harz Mountains. Northwest of the Göttingen Forest is the Bovenden, north-northwest is Nörten-Hardenberg, to the north is Billingshausen, northeast is Ebergötzen, east is Landolfshausen, southeast is Gleichen and southwest and west is the city of Göttingen. The Göttingen Forest lies south of the Rodebach valley, a few kilometres west of the Seeburger See lake, north of the valleys of the Garte and Bramke and several kilometres east of that of the River Leine.

The Göttingen Forest is bounded to the north, east and south predominantly by steep hillsides. The exact boundary of the forest is, however, not always uniformly defined. For example, on the one hand, many define it in a narrow sense as only that part south of the B 27 excluding the Plessforst, on the other hand, others refer to the climbing region of Göttingen Forest, an area also including those woods to the north, east and south.

== Geology ==
The bedrock of the Göttingen Forest area is mainly made up of layers of middle Triassic Muschelkalk. In the incisions made by the Lutter and Braten valleys there are deposits from the Pleistocene and Holocene epochs. The largest and highest-lying part of the forest, namely the plateau-like areas of the northern Plessforst from the Hünstollen to Plesse Castle and the eastern part from the Lengderburg in the south via the Mackenröder Spitze to the Södderich, are characterised by layers of Lower Muschelkalk, whilst Trochitenkalk and Ceratite layers of the Upper Muschelkalk are the predominant formations found in the central and western part of the forest that has undergone greater movement. Middle Muschelkalk is found in the transition areas. In the Lange Nacht region and the adjacent slopes of the Kleper there is an elongated trough of upper Triassic Keuper, and individual pockets of the Lower Keuper are also found in the southern part of the Göttingen Forest. To the north, east and south, regions of sandstone border on the forest. In the west there are Pleistocene silts and finally the Holocene water meadow loam of the Leine valley. Many old quarries are located in the Trochitenkalk and Lower Muschelkalk in which limestone, the main building material for nearby settlements, was obtained. By contrast, the more thinly bedded and very brittle layers were just used as hard core for road building or to reinforce dirt tracks. The limestone areas of the Lower and Upper Muschelkalk are mostly covered with just a thin layer of humus which, even when weathered, do not support very fertile agricultural soils. Settlements were therefore established almost entirely in the areas where Middle Muschelkalk occurs which is also where several small springs rise.

In the lower Triassic Bunter Sandstone region of the Reinhausen Forest to the south there is the largest abri group (rock overhangs caused by erosion) in Central Europe. They are often found in the narrowest part of the ravine-like rocky valleys between the River Leine and the Eichsfeld. In a region of around 30 by 6-10 kilometres there are today around 1600 abris. The sandstone in this area has been quarried for a long time.

== Hills ==
The hills and high points of the Göttingen Forest include:

- Mackenröder Spitze (427.5 metres above sea level (NN))
  - with nearby look-out Harzblick (approx. 425 m above NN)
- Staneberg (426 m)
- Hünstollen (425 m)
- Roringer Spitze (406 m)
- Hoherott (400 m)
- Sauberg (391 m) - formerly inside a military training area
- Ibenberg (388 m)
- Wittenberg (386 m) - with the nearby Plesse Castle
- Büsteppe (387 m)
- Lengderburg (384 m)
- Lippberge (south summit, 383 m; north summit, 377 m)
- Hainberg (ca. 355 m; near Eddigehausen)
- Ratsburg (350 m)
- Hopfenberg (346 m)
- Westerberg (340 m)
- Kleperberg (332 m)
  - with Bismarck Tower at Göttingen (on the summit)
- Feldhornberg (325 m)
- Hainberg (315 m; near Göttingen)
  - with one of the two observatories at Göttingen
  - with the nearby Eulenturm (ca. 250 m above NN)
- Lukasberg (313 m)

== Sources ==
- Ulrich Nagel und Hans-Georg Wunderlich: Geologisches Blockbild der Umgebung von Göttingen (publications by the Lower Saxon Institute for Geography and Regional Development, Series A, Vol. 91, 2nd ed.), 50 pp. + enclosures, Göttingen, 1976
