= Gleichen, Lower Saxony =

Gleichen
- Municipality
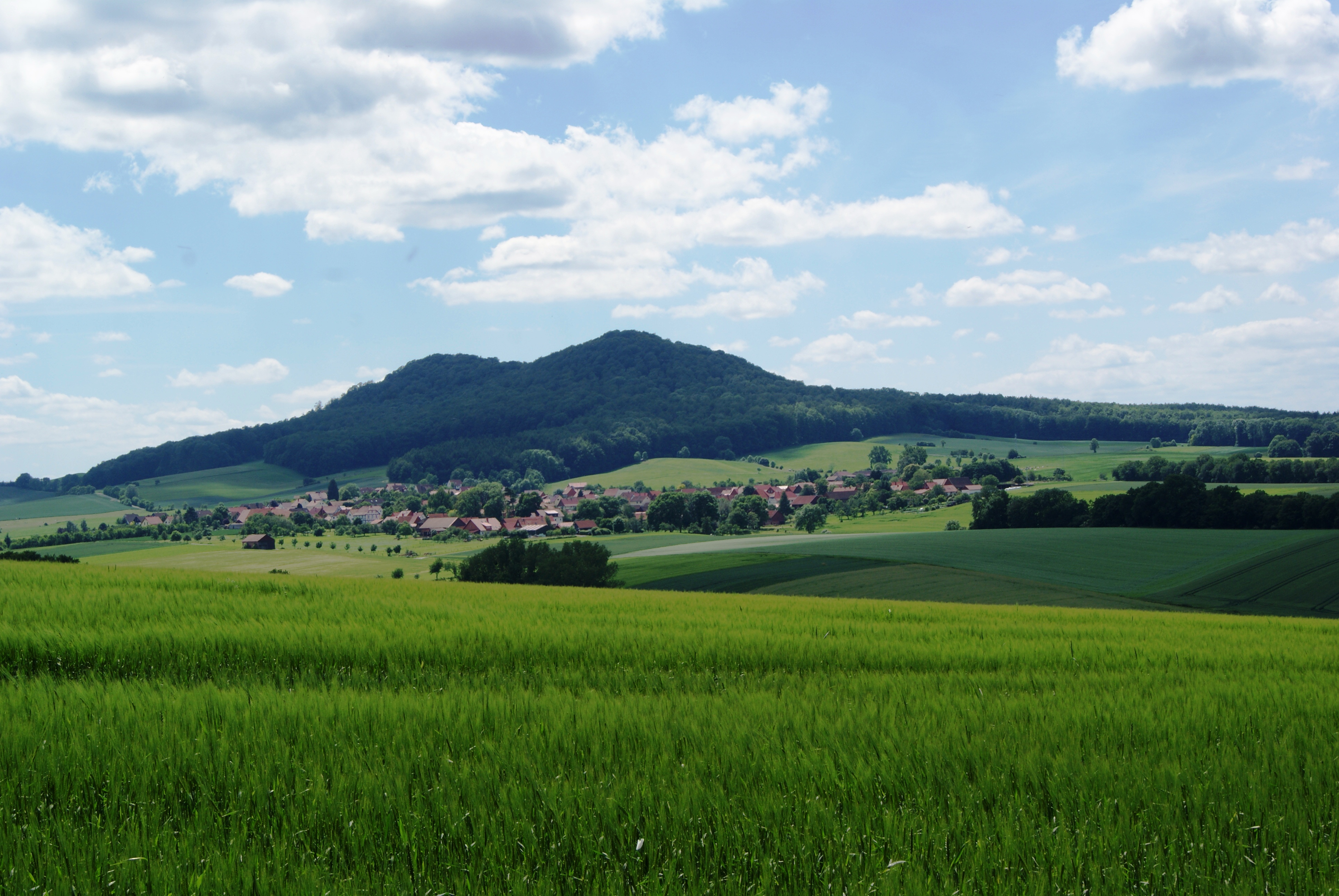

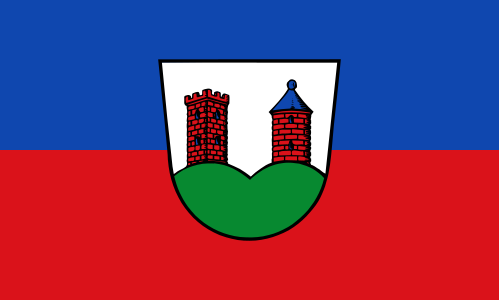
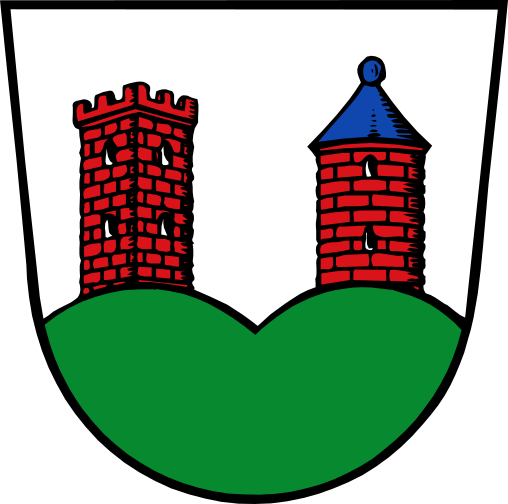
- Flag Coat of arms

- Location of Gleichen within Göttingen district
- Interactive map of Gleichen
- Location within Germany Location within Lower Saxony
- Coordinates: 51°27′43″N 10°02′20″E
- Country: Germany
- State: Lower Saxony
- District: Göttingen
- Subdivisions: 16 villages

Government
  - Mayor (2021–26): Dirk Otter (SPD)

Area
  - Total: 129.25 km^{2} (49.90 sq mi)
- Elevation: 185 m (607 ft)

Population (2025-12-31)
  - Total: 8,610
  - Density: 66.6/km^{2} (173/sq mi)
- Time zone: UTC+01:00 (CET)
  - Summer (DST): UTC+02:00 (CEST)
- Postal codes: 37130
- Dialling codes: 05592, 05508, 0551
- Vehicle registration: GÖ
- Website: www.gleichen.de

Gleichen (German pronunciation: [ˈɡlaɪçn̩]) is a municipality (in this case, a Gemeinde) in the district of Göttingen, in Lower Saxony, Germany. Named after the two castles, Neuen-Gleichen and Alten-Gleichen on the twin peaks in the Gemeinde, it is situated about 10 km southeast of Göttingen, from which the peaks are visible. Its seat is Reinhausen.

== Location ==
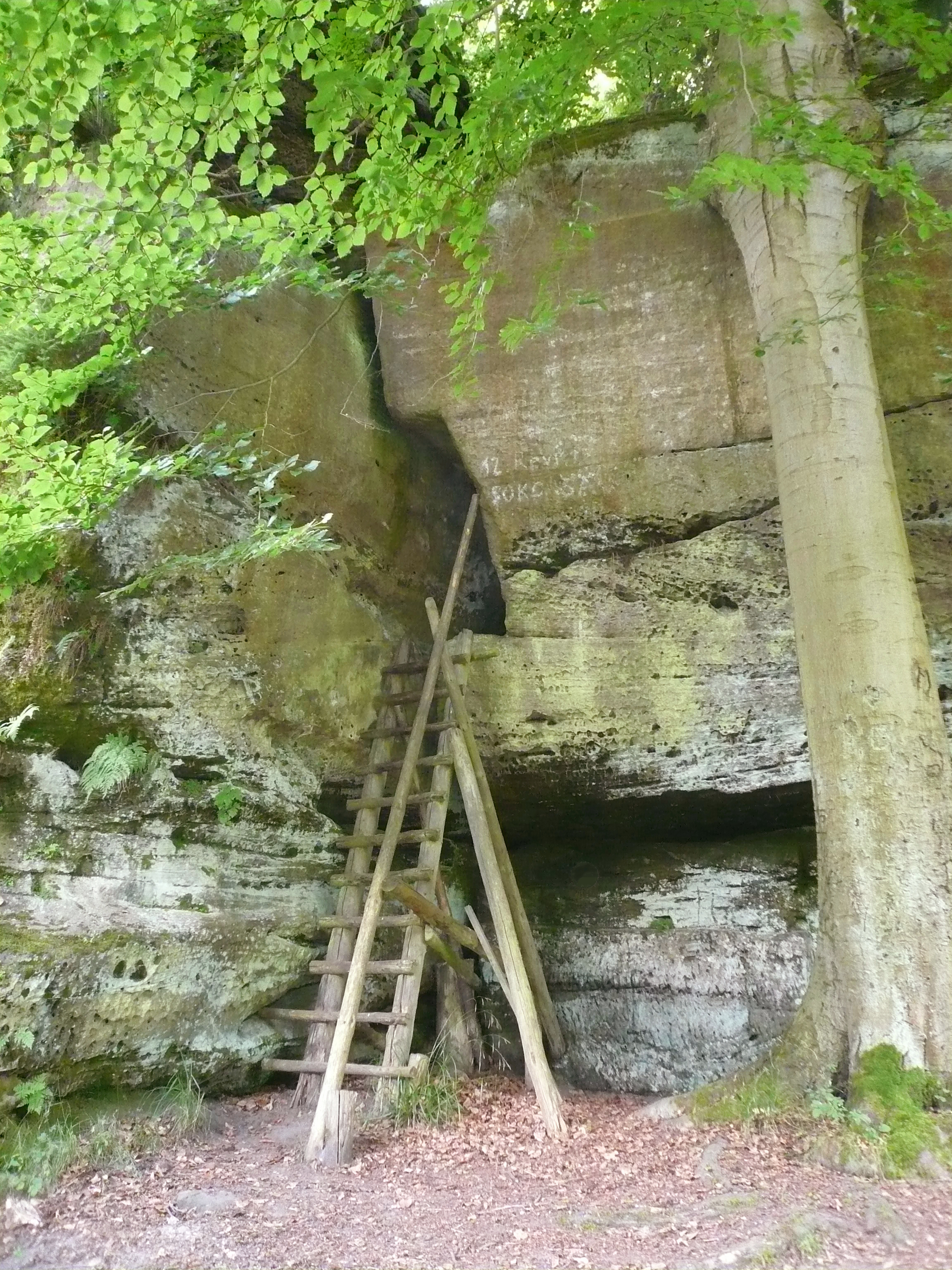
Advanced crevice in the sandstone, former hermitage of monk Henry Hufnagel, 1385

The municipality of Gleichen is located southeast of Göttingen, west-southwest of Duderstadt and north-northwest of Heilbad Heiligenstadt. The River Garte flows through several of the villages in the municipality, as does the small Wendebach stream, which is impounded by the Wendebach Reservoir. Both streams are right, eastern tributaries of the Leine.

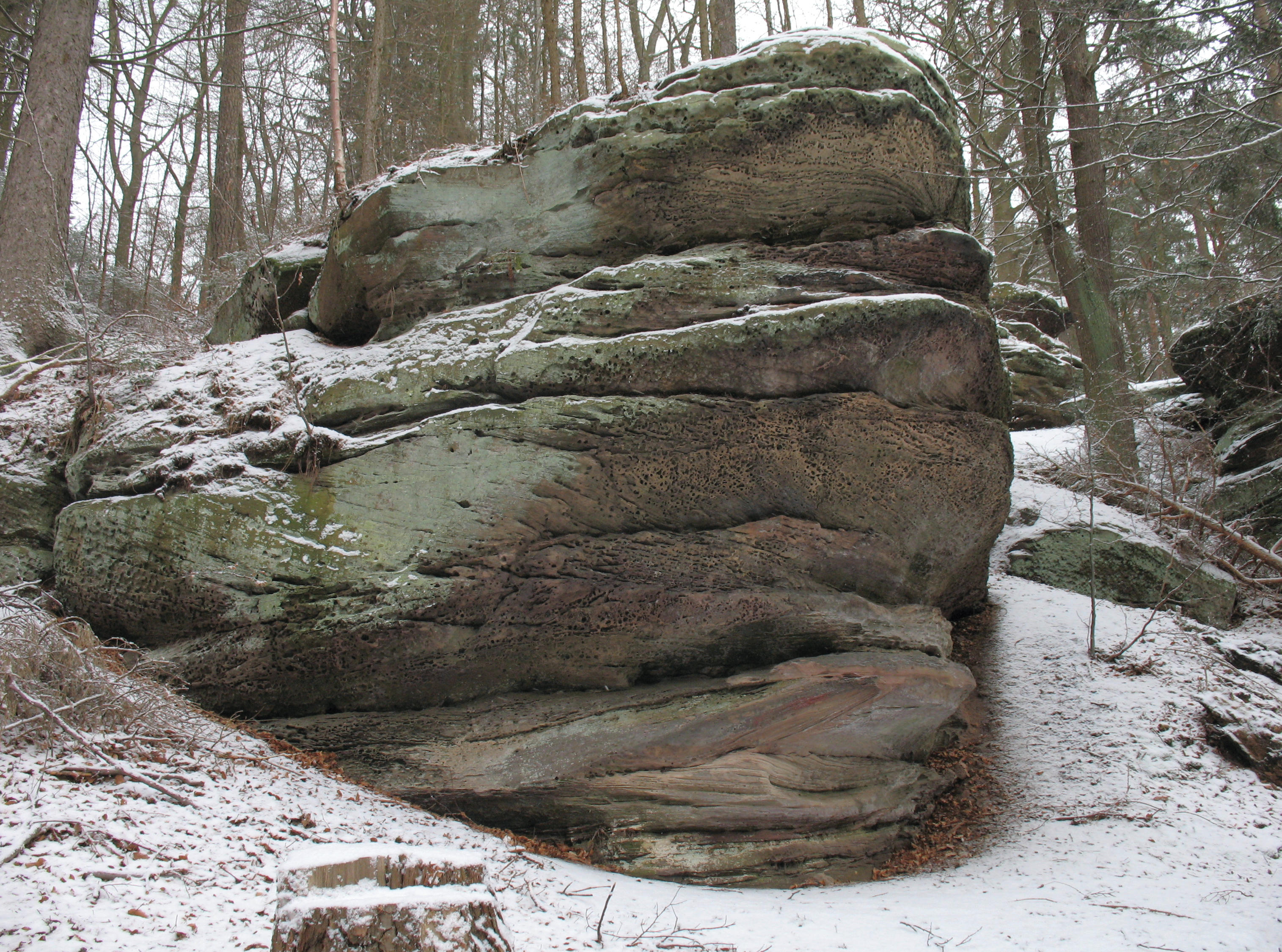
Rocks

In the center of the municipality are Die Gleichen, a pair of hills 430 m high, that rise between Appenrode, Bettenrode and Gelliehausen. Both hills were once crowned by castles, whose ruins may still be seen.

The villages in the municipality may be accessed on state roads (Landesstraßen) branching eastwards off the B 27 federal road.

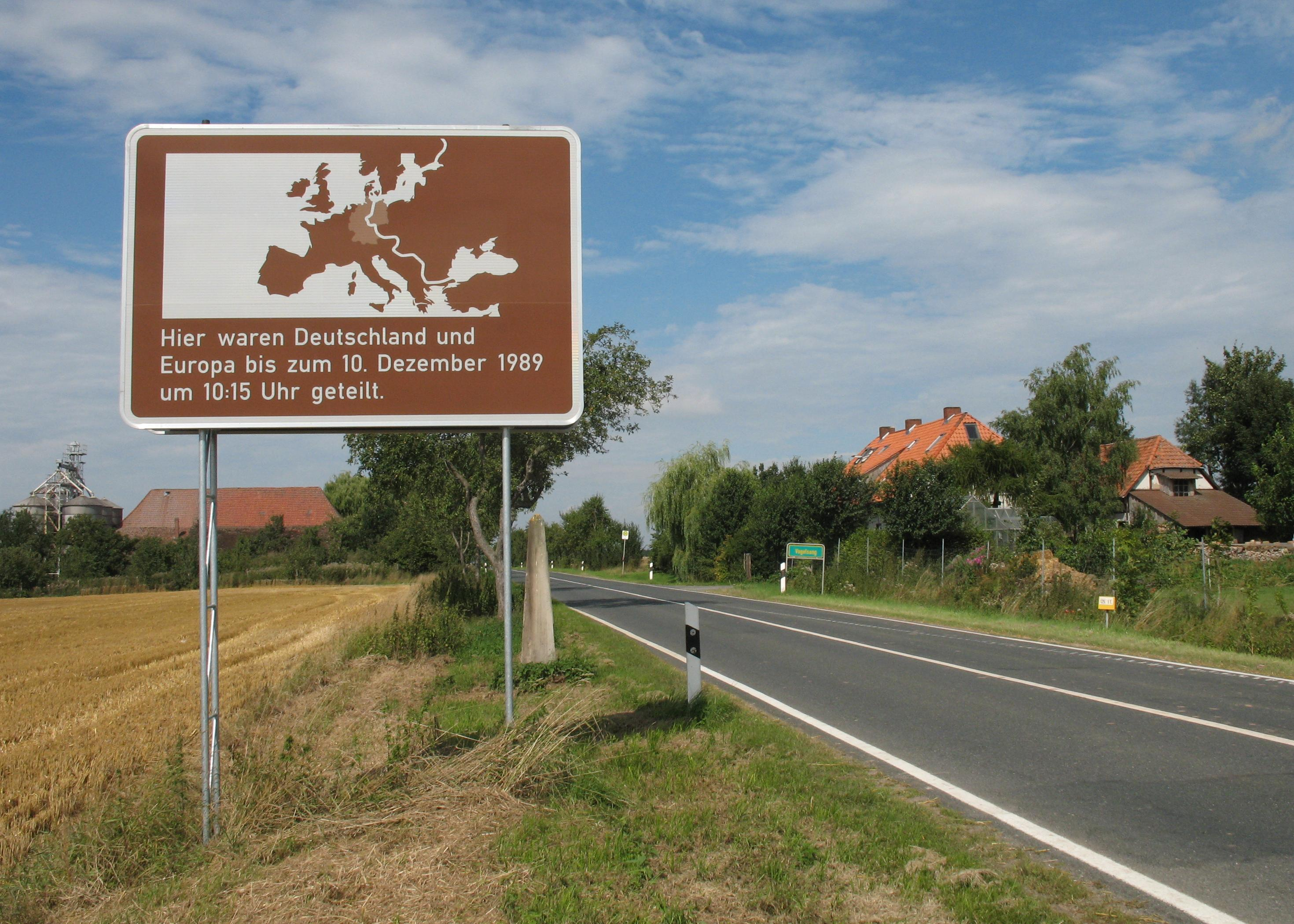

== Subdivisions ==
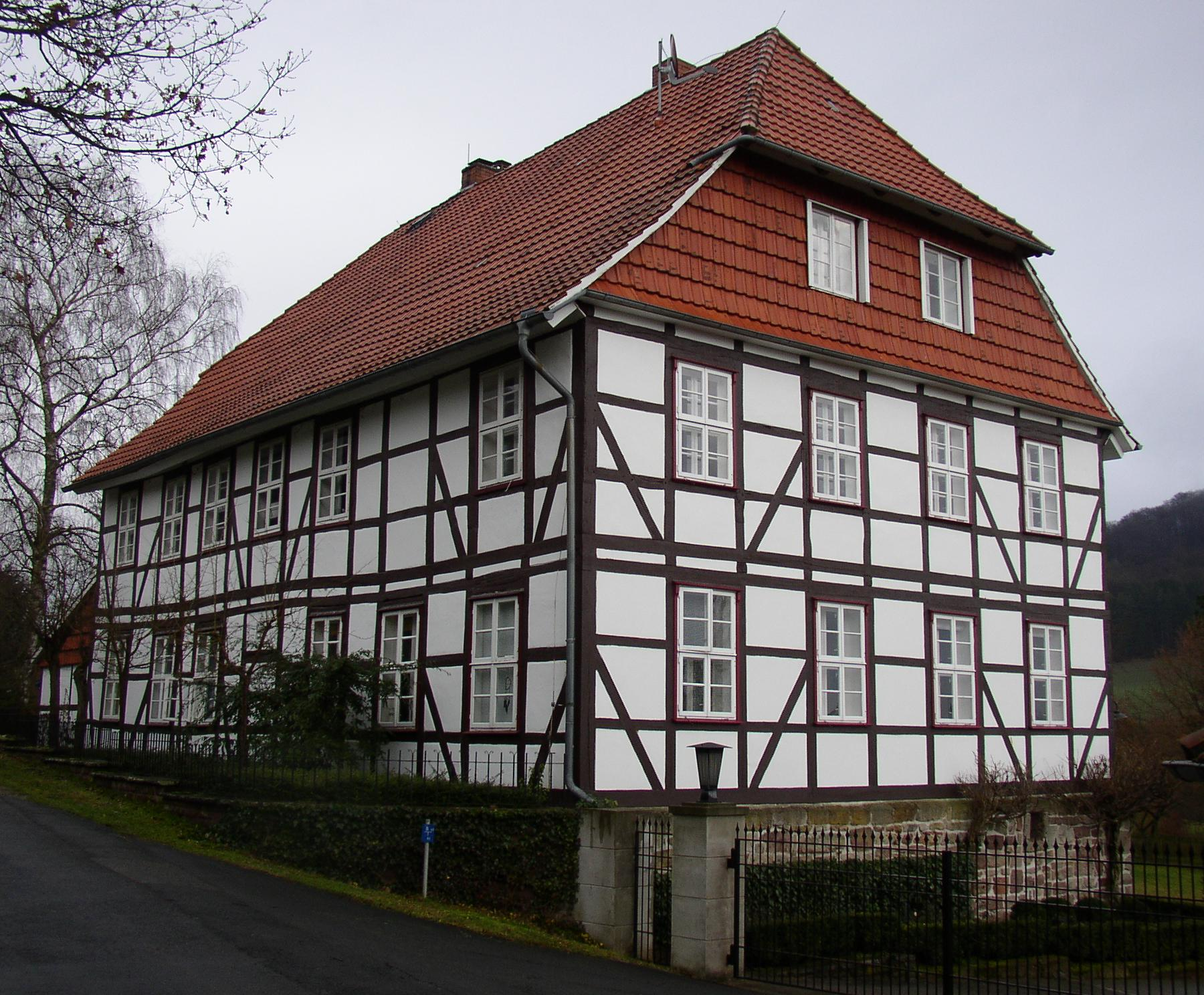
Obergut Appenrode

Besides Reinhausen, the villages in the municipality are:

- Beienrode
- Benniehausen
- Bischhausen
- Bremke
- Diemarden
- Etzenborn
- Gelliehausen
- Gross Lengden
- Ischenrode
- Kerstlingerode
- Klein Lengden
- Rittmarshausen
- Sattenhausen
- Weißenborn
- Wöllmarshausen

=== Political situation ===
Currently, the community council of twenty-five (including the mayor) has eleven SPD, six CDU, five Greens, two BsP, and one SWG members.

=== Cultural resources and attractions ===
The Akademie Waldschloesschen lies on the L568 between Reinhausen and Bremke. In Bremke itself, there is the Waldbühne, an outdoor stage where, since 1949, fairy tales have been presented in the form of plays.

== Personalities ==
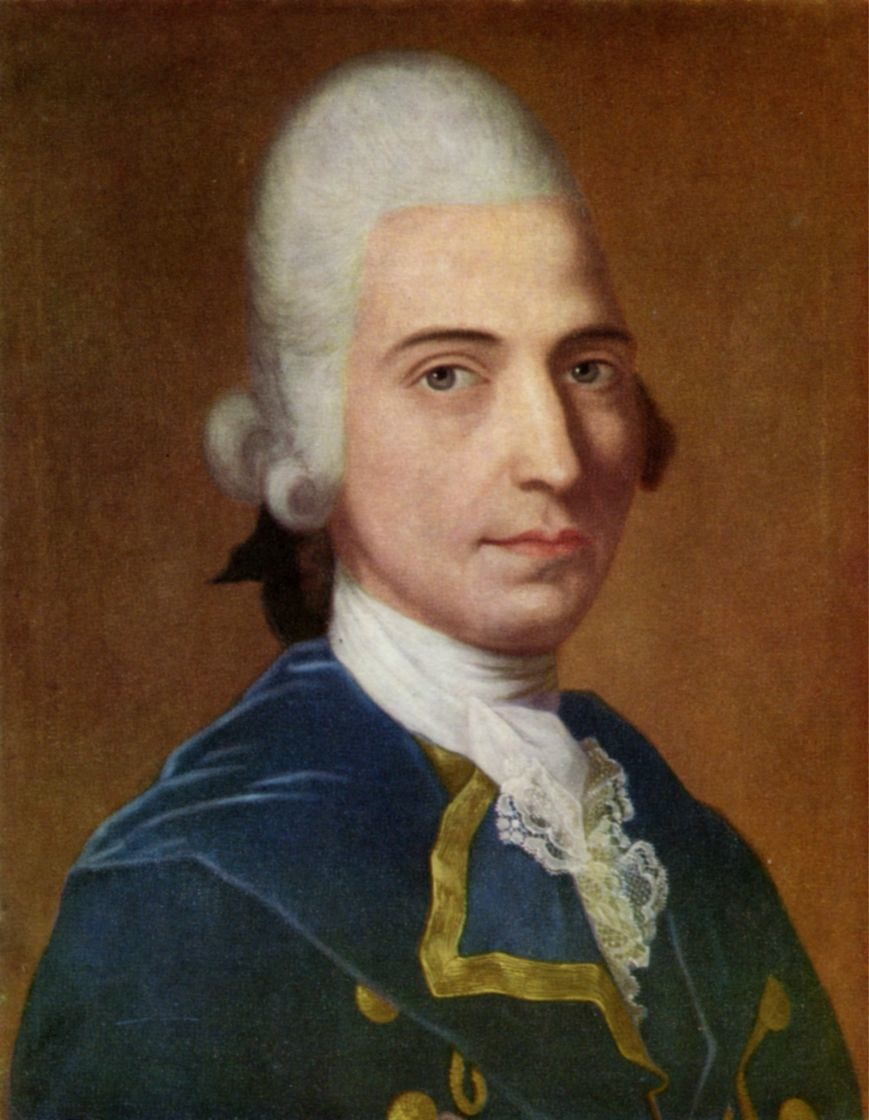
Gottfried August Bürger

- Gottfried August Bürger(1747-1794), the poet lived from 1772 to 1773 in Gelliehausen and 1774 to 1784 in Wöllmarshausen and worked from 1772 to 1784 as court elderly in the Amtshaus in Gelliehausen
- Werner Schröder (1916-2010), jurist, judge at the Bundessozialgericht in Kassel
- Klaus-Peter Bruns (1913-2011) German farmer and politician (SPD).
