= Ischenrode =

Village in Lower Saxony, Germany

Ischenrode is a village in the Gemeinde Gleichen, Göttingen, Braunschweig Bezirk (district), Lower Saxony, Germany.

Its geographical coordinates are 51°26′N 10°02′E. It lies SSE of Göttingen, in a valley called the Ischenröder Schweiz in the shadow of the Reinhaeuserwald, on L567, a winding little road between Bremke and Lichtenhagen (a district of Friedland).

The population in 2010 was 153.

== History ==
The earliest record of the village is from A.D. 1168. It was next mentioned in a regional church record of A.D. 1207. The village's name has changed over time, the current form first mentioned in A.D. 1541.

On the first of January 1973, Ischenrode was incorporated into the newly formed Gemeinde Gleichen.

== Economy ==
The community includes a mechanics' garage, an inn and a hotel.

== Government ==
The mayor is Manfred Kuhlmann.

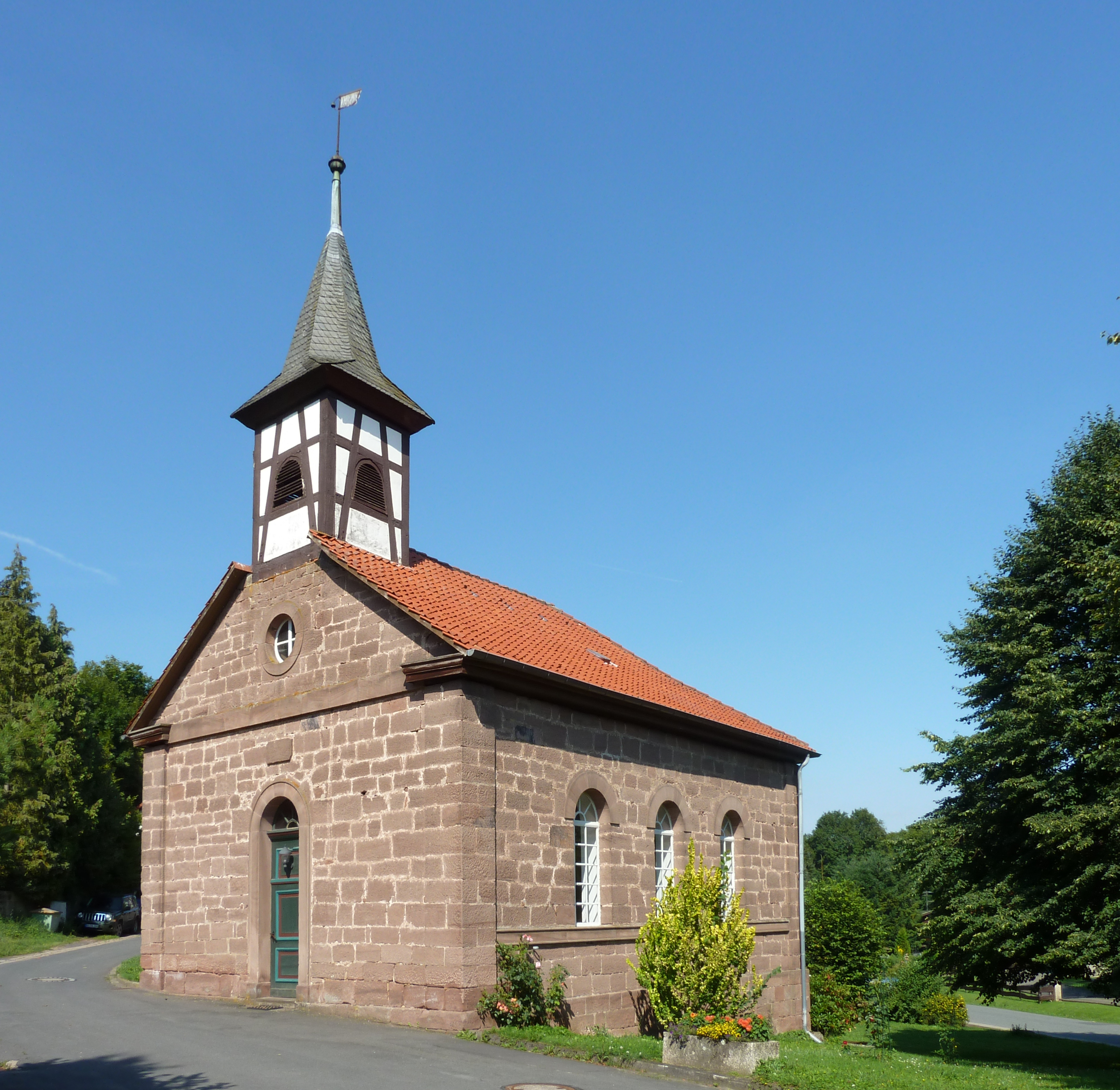
Ischenrode Kapelle

== Organizations ==
- Since 2011, the Lutheran congregation has been part of a four-village congregation (Bremke, Bischhausen, Weißenborn and Ischenrode) under the name Ev. luth. Kreuzweg-Kirchengemeinde in Gleichen.
- The village has a volunteer fire department, founded in 1947.
- The Heimatverein Ischenrode e.V. was founded in 1984 to "preserve and strengthen the village community."
- There is a sports club for Ischenrode and neighboring Bremke, TSV 04 Bremke/Ischenrode e.V. Sports supported include soccer, table tennis, and bossel (road bowling). The team colors are green and white.

== Postal code (PLZ) ==
37130
