= Sattenhausen =

Village in Germany

Coordinates: 51°30′N 10°06′E

Sattenhausen is a village in the north-western part of the Gleichen in the Göttingen district of Lower Saxony, Germany. It had 563 residents as of the end of 2005. That number had dropped to 532 by the end of 2012 (488 of them with the main seat of residence as the village).

The village lies surrounded by farm fields in turn surrounded by forested hills. The nearest neighboring villages are Falkenhagen about a kilometer to the north and Wöllmarshausen slightly more distant to the south, each of which is about two kilometers distant. The city of Göttingen is about seven kilometers to the west. The community's visual image is characterized by half-timbered houses and the village's late medieval church tower's defensive structure.

== History ==
The village is believed to have been started in the ninth or tenth century.

== Government ==
- Mayor: Wolfgang Rümenapf

== Sources ==
- Das bietet Sattenhausen: http://www.gleichen.de/sattenhausen/home.htm
- http://www.wiki-goettingen.de/index.php?title=Sattenhausen

== See also ==
- http://www.wiki-goettingen.de/index.php?title=Sattenhausen
