= Falkenhagen (disambiguation) =

Falkenhagen may refer to:

== Places ==
=== Germany ===
- Falkenhagen, a municipality of Märkish-Oderland, Brandenburg
- Falkenhagen (Falkensee), a civil parish of Falkensee, in the district of Havelland (Brandenburg)
- Falkenhagen (Landolfshausen), a civil parish of Landolfshausen, in the district of Göttingen (Lower Saxony)
- Falkenhagen (Lügde), a civil parish of Lügde, in the district of Lippe (North Rhine-Westphalia)
- Falkenhagener Feld, a locality of the district of Spandau, Berlin

== People ==
- Adam Falckenhagen (1697–1754), German lutenist
- Alfred M. Falkenhagen (1898-1968), American farmer and politician
- Hans Falkenhagen (1895–1971), German physicist
- Lena Falkenhagen (b. 1973), German writer
