= Die Gleichen =

Pair of hills in Lower Saxony, Germany

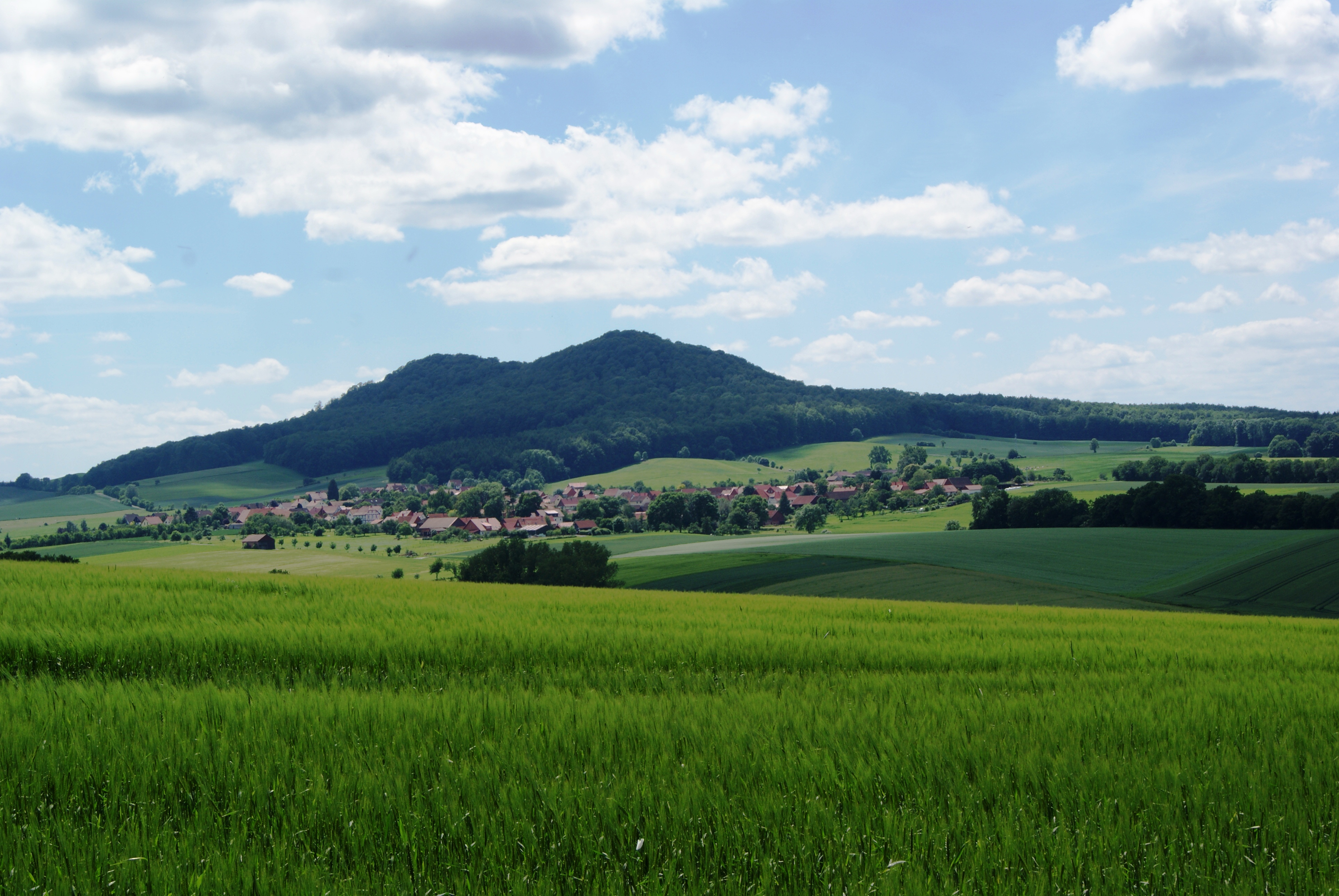
- Die Gleichen Hills

Highest point
- Elevation: 432 m (1,417 ft)
- Coordinates: 51°28′2″N 10°2′19″E

Geography
- Location: near Gelliehausen; Göttingen district, Lower Saxony (Germany)

Die Gleichen (German pronunciation: [diː ˈɡlaɪçn̩]) are a pair of hills, up to 430 metres high, in the district of Göttingen in South Lower Saxony in Germany. The twin hills, that were once the site of two fortifications, gave their name to the village of Gleichen.

== Geography ==
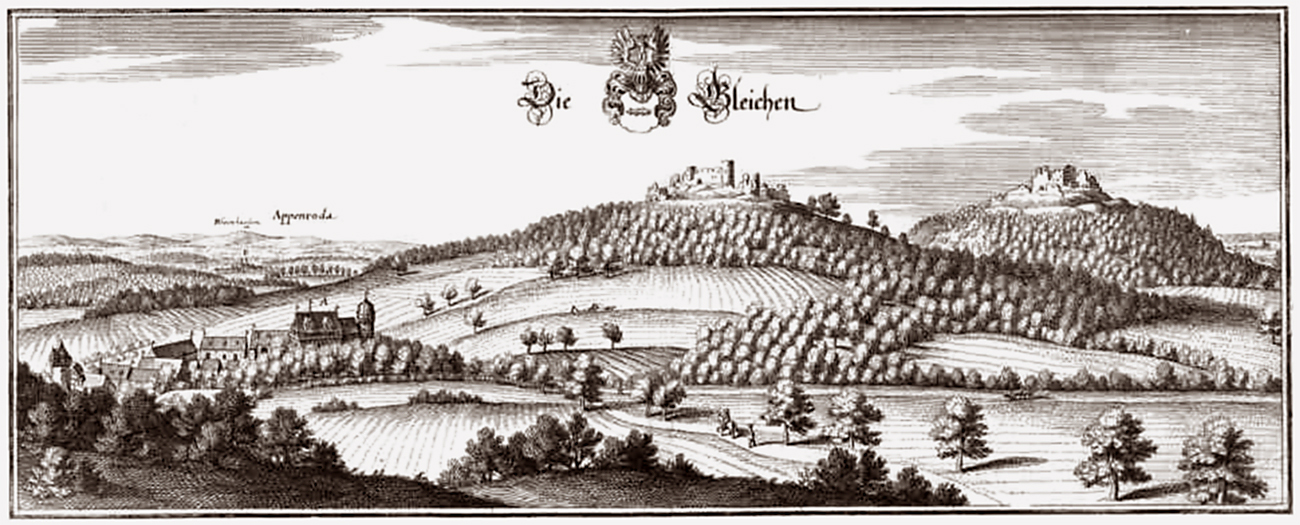
Copperplate engraving by Matthäus Merian dating to pre-1650: in the centre the Alte Gleichen; right: the Neue Gleichen

The pair of hills, that comprise the Alte Gleichen (432 m AMSL; the southern hill) and Neue Gleichen (428 m; the northern hill), rise in the centre of the parish of Gleichen just southwest of the small hamlet of Gelliehausen. They are about 400 metres apart and are located south of the Garte stream and north of the Wendebach, both right, eastern tributaries of the River Leine. Southeast of the Gleichen is another hill, the Eschenberg (404 m).

The summits of the two heavily wooded hills can be reached on foot, for example from Appenrode and Gelliehausen.

== History ==
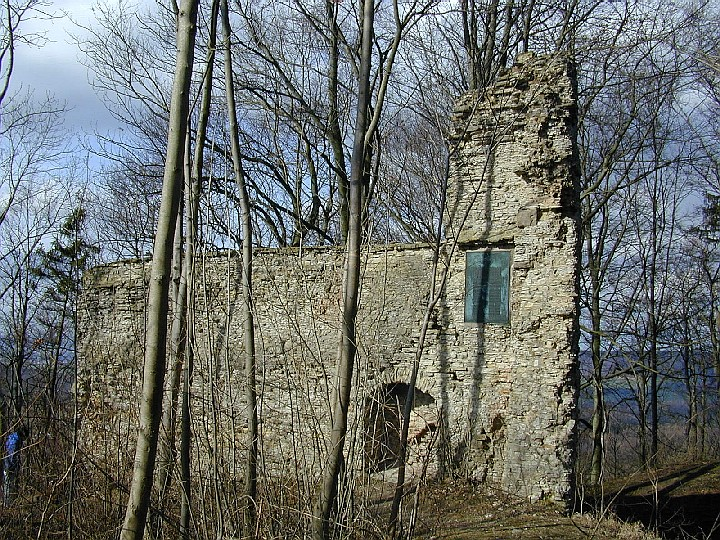
Castle ruins on the Alte Gleichen

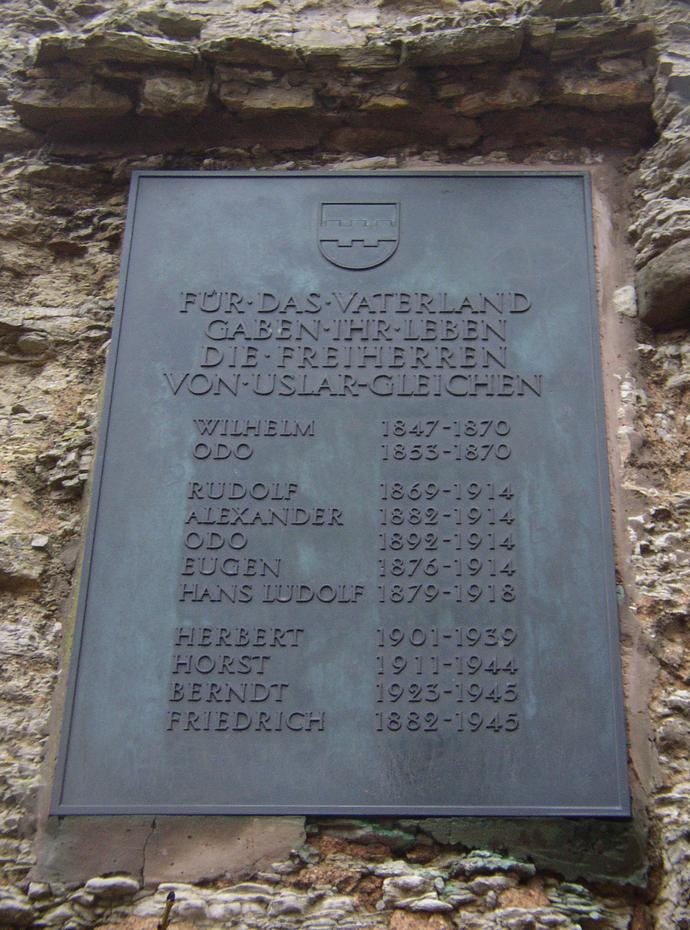
Memorial tablet on the Alte Gleichen

Both hills were once crowned with castles in the time of Henry the Lion. They were built around 1100 by the Counts of Reinhausen, who had turned their ancestral seat in Reinhausen into an Augustinian monastery. Thereafter the castles changed hands several times. Finally around 1270, the Gleichen went to the Lords of Uslar. Soon afterwards the House of Uslar divided the assets between the two lines of Altengleichen and Neuengleichen. Neuengleichen fell in 1451 to the Landgraves of Hesse, whilst Altengleichen remained under Guelph rule. Not until the wake of the course of the Vienna Congress was ownership of Neuengleichen relinquished to the Kingdom of Hanover and from then on re-transferred back to the House of Uslar (at Altengleichen), which since 1825 had been called Uslar-Gleichen. The Gleichen castles were never captured in the numerous feuds, but had been abandoned in the 16th century. The occupants moved to farms that formerly supplied them in the neighbourhood; the castles fell into ruins that are still visible, especially on those of Altengleichen.

The Göttingen mathematician, David Hilbert, used to ask in his lectures why the hills were called die Gleichen (literally: "the same"). They neither look the same, nor are they the same height. When no-one knew the answer, he replied: because they are the same distance from one another.
