= Weißenborn (Gleichen) =

Village in Germany

Coordinates: 51.4394°N 10.1289°E

Weißenborn (German pronunciation: [ˈvaɪsn̩bɔʁn]) is a village in the municipality Gleichen (district of Göttingen), east of the city of Göttingen, Germany and between Bischhausen and Glasenhausen, near the border of Thuringia. The population is about 260 people. The Garte creek originates in the village. In addition to High German, the Elbe Eastphalian dialect of West Low German is spoken in the town. The mayor is Friedrich Ehbrecht. There is one church, the Lutheran Nicolaikirche.

== Social and cultural activities ==
=== Sports ===
In 1921 the SV Fürth Weißenborn was founded, after a wartime interruption, it was re-juvenated, only to undergo some ups and downs, including a merger in 1968 to form SV Bischhausen/Weißenborn. Soccer, though the original sport of the club, has declined in interest, hiking and gymnastics are actively pursued these days. The club has a club-house in Weißenborn.

=== Schützenverein ===
The village has an active Schützenverein (marksmen club), with a festival in the first weekend in July every year. The organization has its own building, which can be used for family festivals throughout the year.

== Volunteer Fire Department ==
There are a volunteer fire department and a youth volunteer fire department in the village. The volunteer fire department was founded in 1921, while the youth fire department was founded in 1975.
