= Klein Lengden =

Village in the Göttingen district of Lower Saxony, Germany

Coordinates: 51°30′N 10°01′E

Klein Lengden is a village in the Gleichen in the Göttingen district of Lower Saxony, Germany, about eight to ten kilometers south-east of Göttingen. According to the 2010 census, it has about 1363 inhabitants. The village lies in the Garte valley, south of the forested hills of Lengderburg (384 meters a.s.l.) with its Lengdener Burg (castle) and Westerberg (340 meters a.s.l.) and is otherwise surrounded by farm fields. The nearest neighboring villages are Gross Lengden to the east and Diemarden to the west-south-west, each of which is about two kilometers distant.

Just outside the village, on L569, the road to Benniehausen, is the Historische Spinnerei Gartetal (historical spinning works of the Garte Valley). In the late 16th century, a flour mill was erected on the site. In the middle of the following century, a paper mill was added. The Industrial Revolution led to the conversion to a spinnery for flannel and woolen yarn.

== History ==
The earliest known record of the town was as Lengithi or Lengidi in A.D. 822 in the Fulda monastery's Codex Eberhardi.

During most of the years in which the Garte Valley Railway operated, Klein Lengden was one of the stations, closing in 1957, two years before the disbandment of the line, which ran between Göttingen and Duderstadt.

== Government ==
- Mayor: Klaus-Werner Hanelt

== Sources ==
- Das bietet Klein Lengden: http://www.gleichen.de/kl-lengden/home.htm
