= Gelliehausen =

Coordinates: 51°28′N 10°03′E

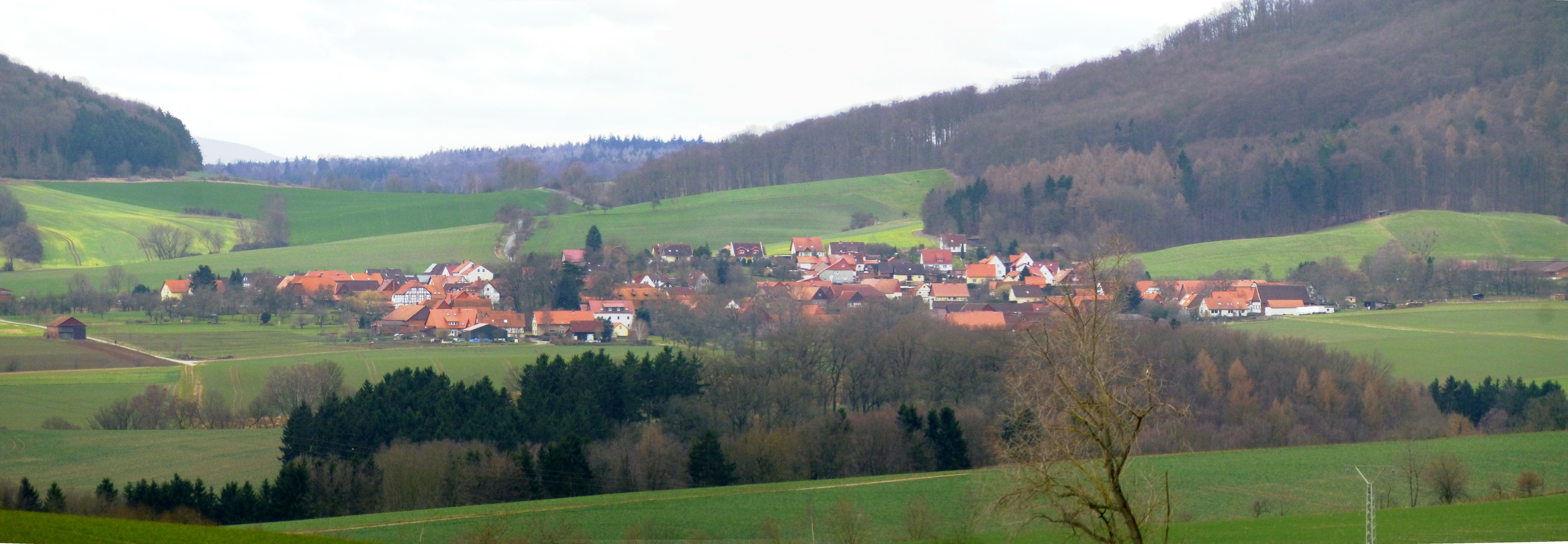

Gelliehausen is a nucleated village just south of Benniehausen in the Gemeinde Gleichen in southern Lower Saxony with a population of 452 (as of 12 December 2005). The village is located at the foot of the twin hills called the Gleichen. The small community has a pond next to its "Bürgerhaus."

The mayor is Gerhard Nolte.

The most famous person associated with Gelliehausen is Gottfried August Bürger, an eighteenth-century poet who lived there for a while.
