= Wendebach Reservoir =

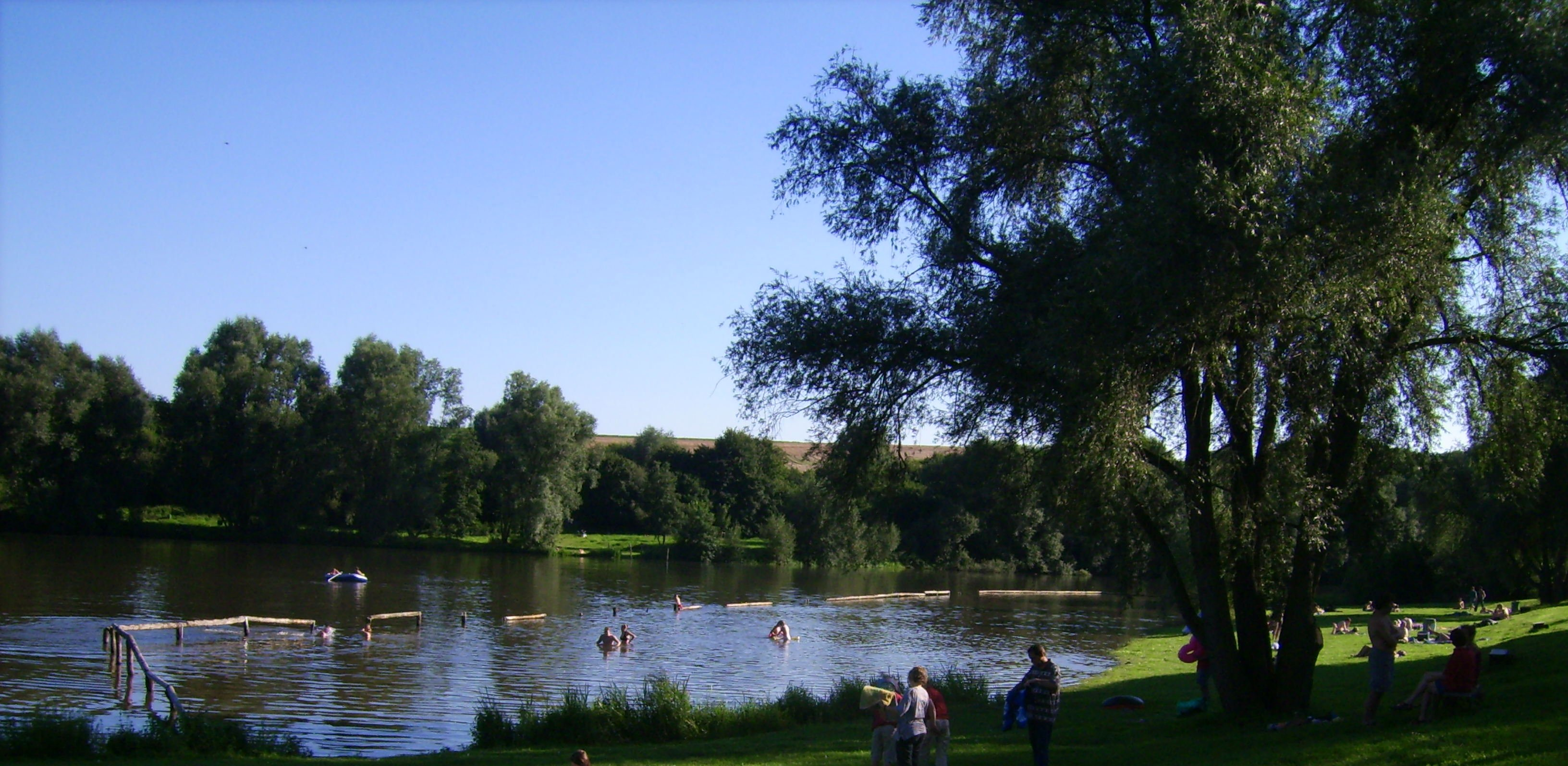
- Wendebach Reservoir

- Location within Lower Saxony Location within Germany Location within Europe
- Location: Landkreis Göttingen
- Coordinates: 51°28′12.36″N 9°56′42.57″E
- Construction began: by 1973

Dam and spillways
- Impounds: Wendebach
- Height (foundation): 15 m (49 ft)
- Length: 260 m (850 ft)
- Dam volume: 70,000 m^{3} (2,500,000 cu ft)

Reservoir
- Active capacity: 1.52×10^{6} m^{3} (54×10^{6} cu ft)
- Surface area: 8.5 ha (21 acres)

Wendebach Reservoir (German: Wendebachstausee) is an artificial lake with a surrounding recreation park (Erholungspark Wendebach) in the municipalities of Gleichen and Friedland, Lower Saxony, Germany, about 8 km south of Göttingen. It is a popular summer outing goal for residents and students of Göttingen. There is a swimming beach and dock. In addition, there are some park facilities such as a first-aid post, grills, a food stall and outhouses. The reservoir is used by anglers.

The reservoir was created in 1973 by the damming of the Wendebach stream, a tributary of the Leine, with an earth dam. Original work on this flood control project began in 1967. Its surface area is up to 8.5 hectares.

In the summer of 2010, the Ministry for the Environment announced that the reservoir does not provide flood protection and that the dam is unstable and must be removed. Nevertheless, after political pressure, the situation was re-evaluated, and a removal of the top part of the dam has been declared adequate when combined with some re-building. As a result, the reservoir will be retained. The reworking of the dam ran from 2014 into 2015. The facility was re-opened to the public on 7 June 2016.
