= Wöllmarshausen =

Village in Germany

Coordinates: 51°29′N 10°05′E

Wöllmarshausen is a village in the Garte valley in the municipality (Gemeinde) Gleichen in the district Göttingen, Germany. The nucleated village of 401 residents (as of December 31, 2005) is primarily agricultural. There are a number of natural springs in and around the wooded village.

== Government ==
Mayor: Joachim Klabunde
