= Reinhausen =

Village in Göttingen, Germany

Coordinates: 51.469°N 9.980°E

Coat of arms

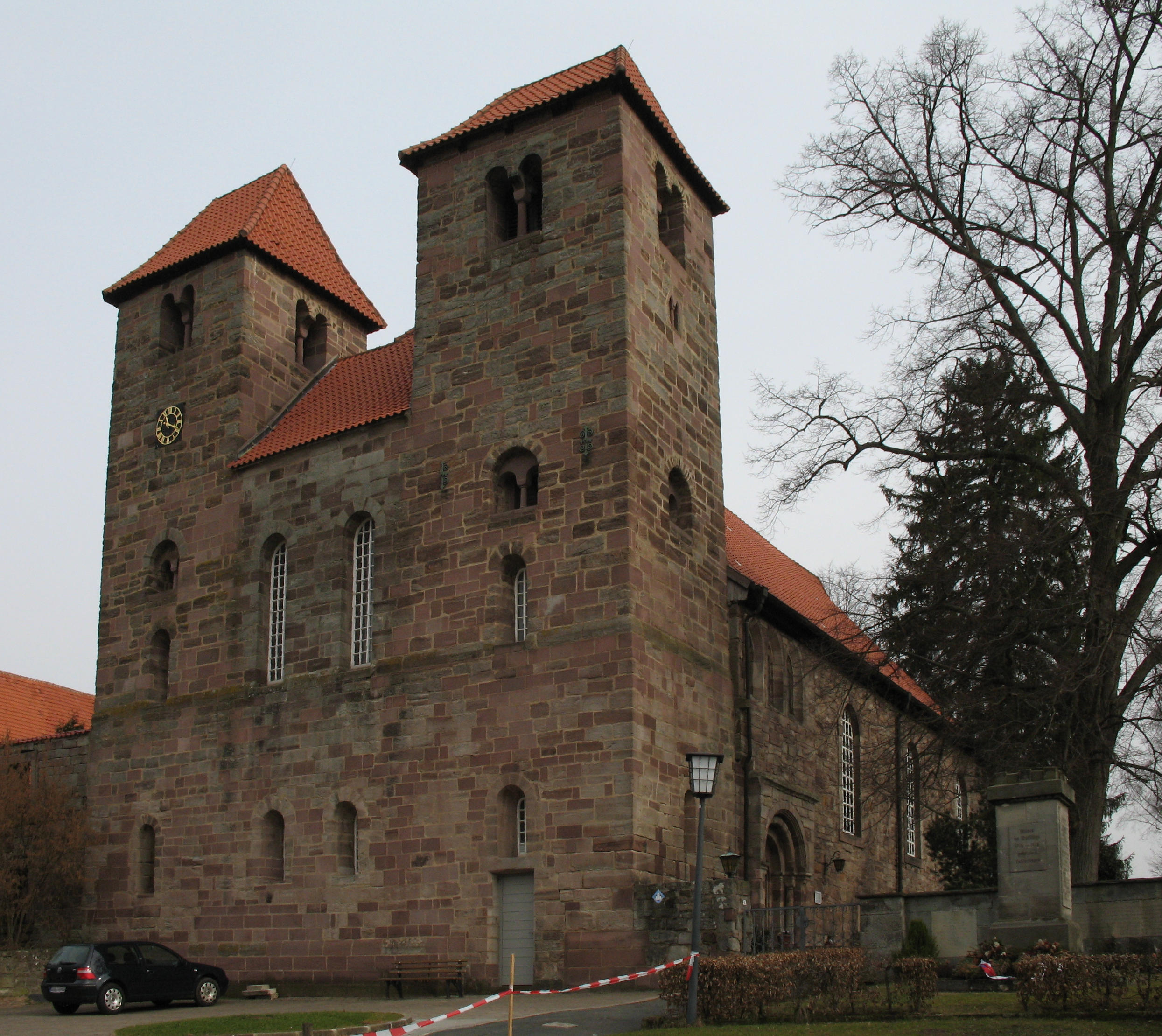
Church

Reinhausen is the largest village in the municipality (Gemeinde) Gleichen in the district Göttingen, Germany. It is also the seat of government for the Gleichen. The village has 1,500 residents (as of December 31, 2005). The village mayor is Ulrike Benstem. The village was settled in the tenth century or earlier. Along the main road running through the village are medieval cross-in-circles carved into the massive stone hillside. Originally begun in the tenth century as a castle, the Lutheran church in the village was formerly a monastery.

Reinhausen is largely a combination of an agricultural village and a bedroom community for the city of Göttingen, about ten kilometers to the north. There are a few stores in the village, catering to local needs. Not far from the town is the Wendebach Reservoir, a popular local lake and park.

== Forest ==
The nearby hilly bunter of Reinhäuser Wald constitutes a forest district of some 18,000 hectares of primarily deciduous trees with light undergrowth including ferns. The primary species of tree is the beech (Fagus sylvatica), accounting for 57% of the trees. Other significant species include oak (Quercus robur and Q. petraea), Norway spruce (Picea abies), and larch (Larix decidua). The canopy is heavy enough to make for a significantly different micro-climate, with less extreme temperature variation.

The forest is managed by the district office, with its seat in Reinhausen and is responsible for fourteen forest ranger districts and the Regional Environmental Education Center. The forest is open to the public, but harvesting of timber is the responsibility of the Landesforstamt, which uses low impact methods (use of heavy horses) and follows the principle of sustainable development.

The forest contains numerous abris, some of which have evidence of use since at least the Mesolithic.

Reinhaeuser Wald

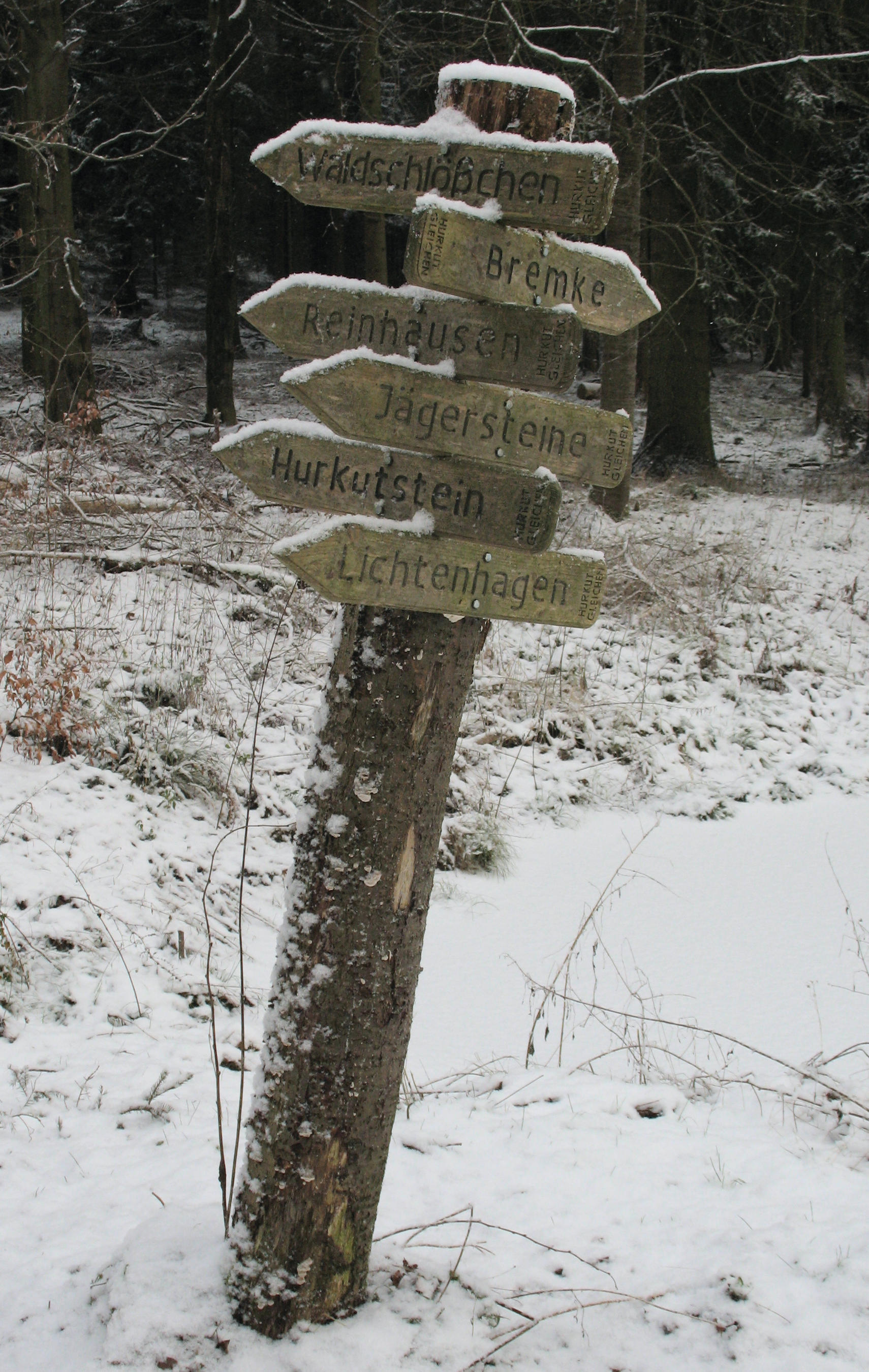

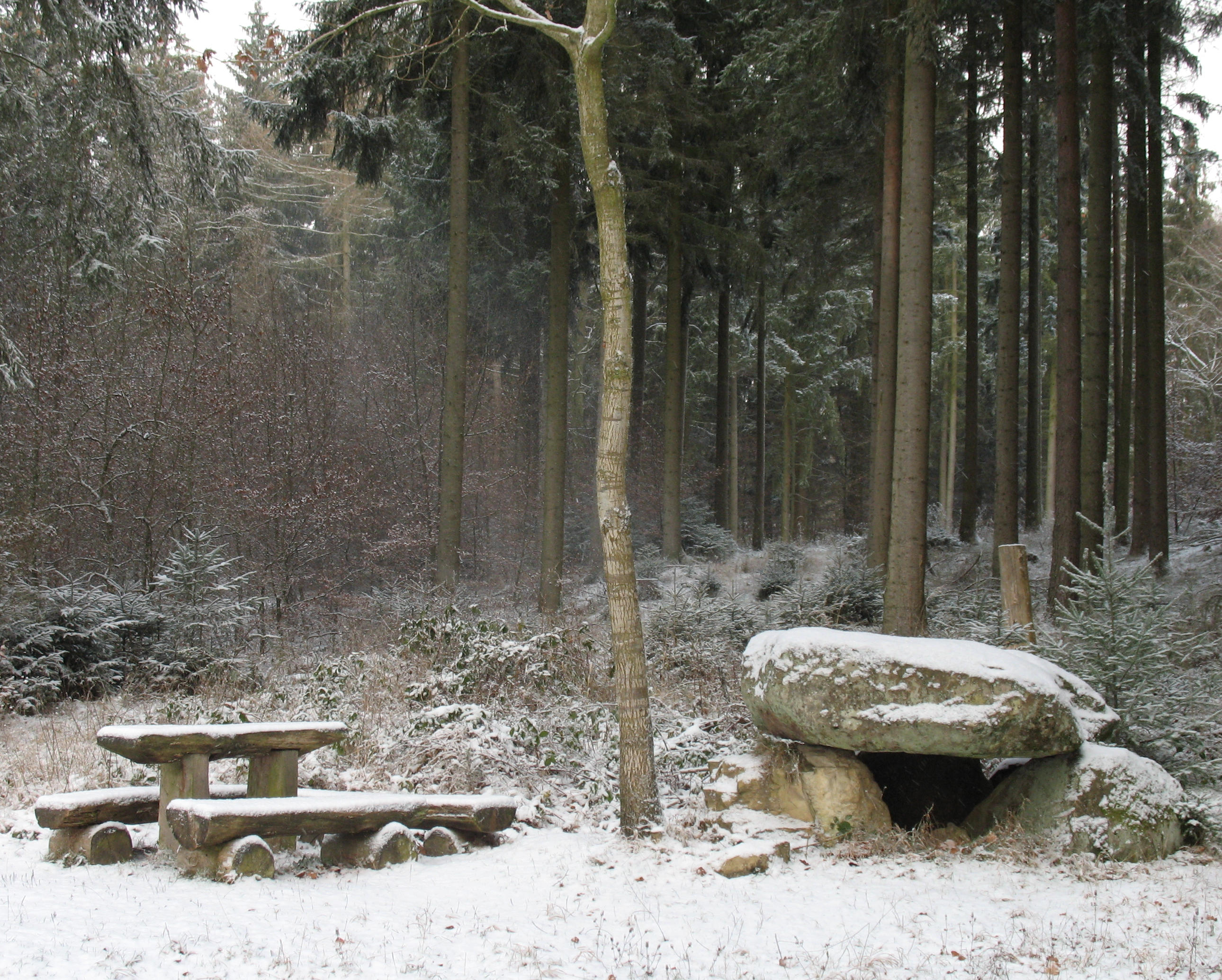

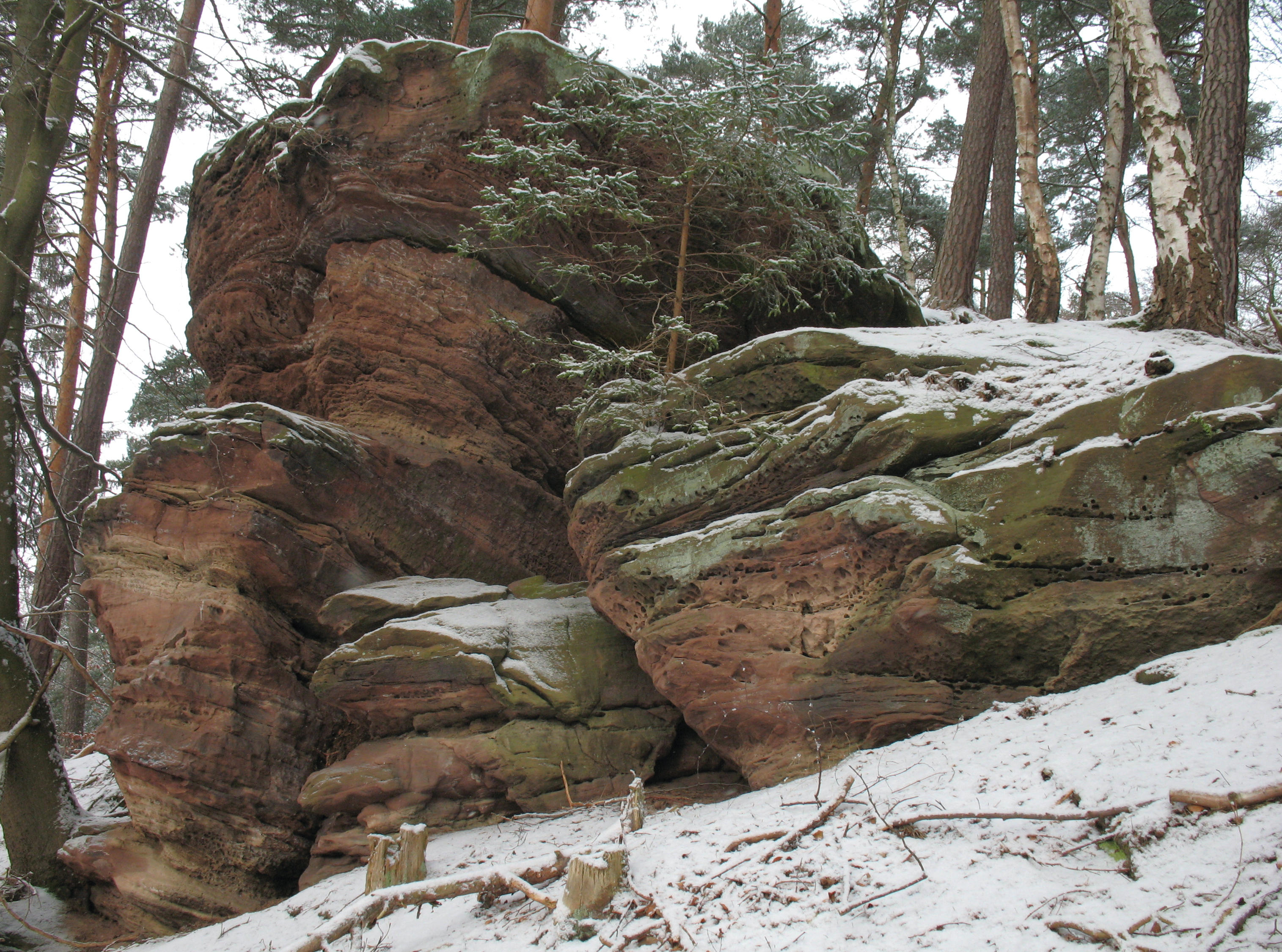

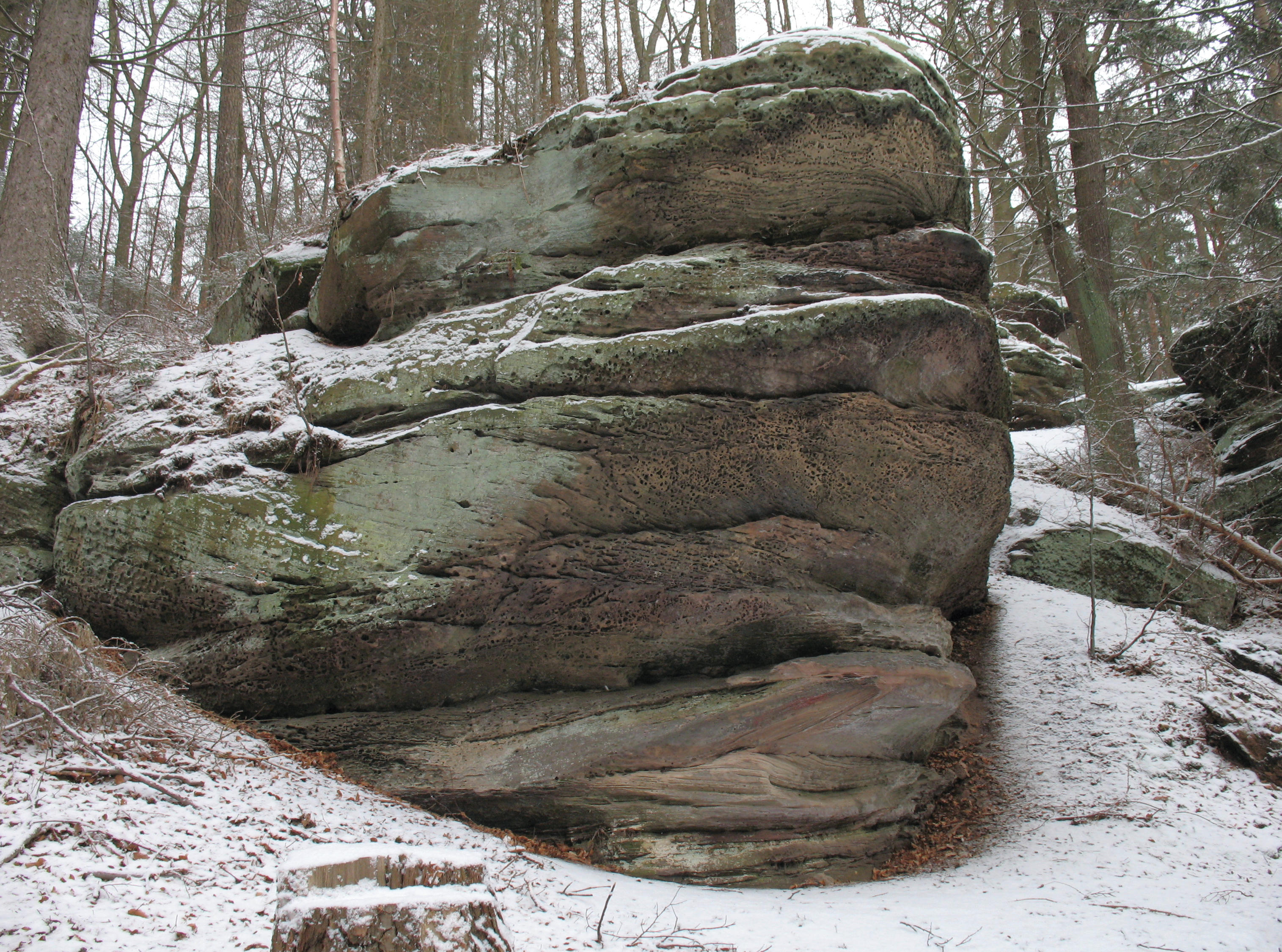

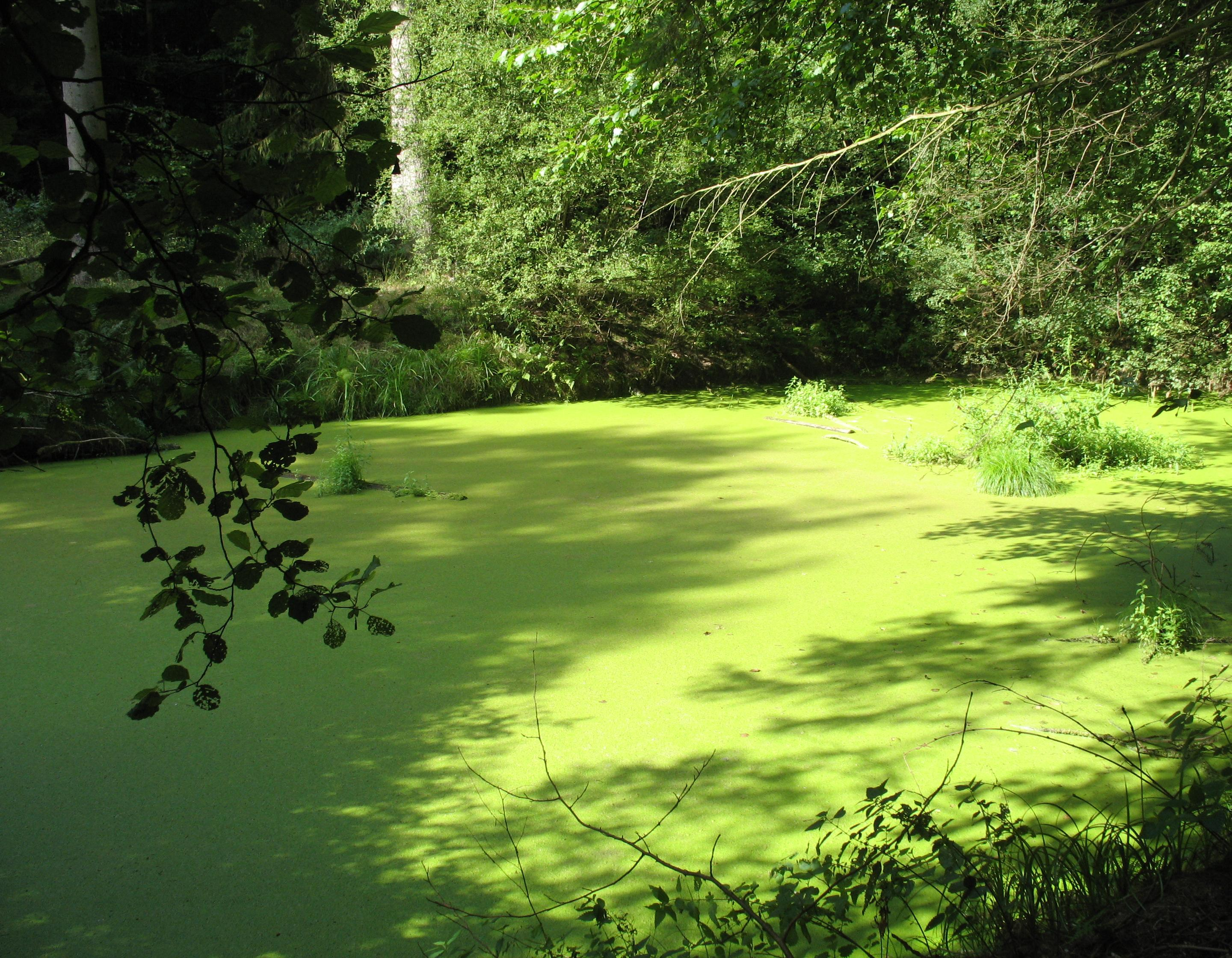
