= Etzenborn =

- Ortsteil of Gleichen
- Coat of arms
- Interactive map of Etzenborn
- Location within Germany Location within Lower Saxony
- Coordinates: 51°28′00″N 10°09′00″E
- Country: Germany
- State: Lower Saxony
- District: Göttingen
- Municipality: Gleichen

Population (2010)
  - Total: 216
- Time zone: UTC+01:00 (CET)
  - Summer (DST): UTC+02:00 (CEST)

Etzenborn is a village in the Lower Saxony Gemeinde Gleichen, Germany.

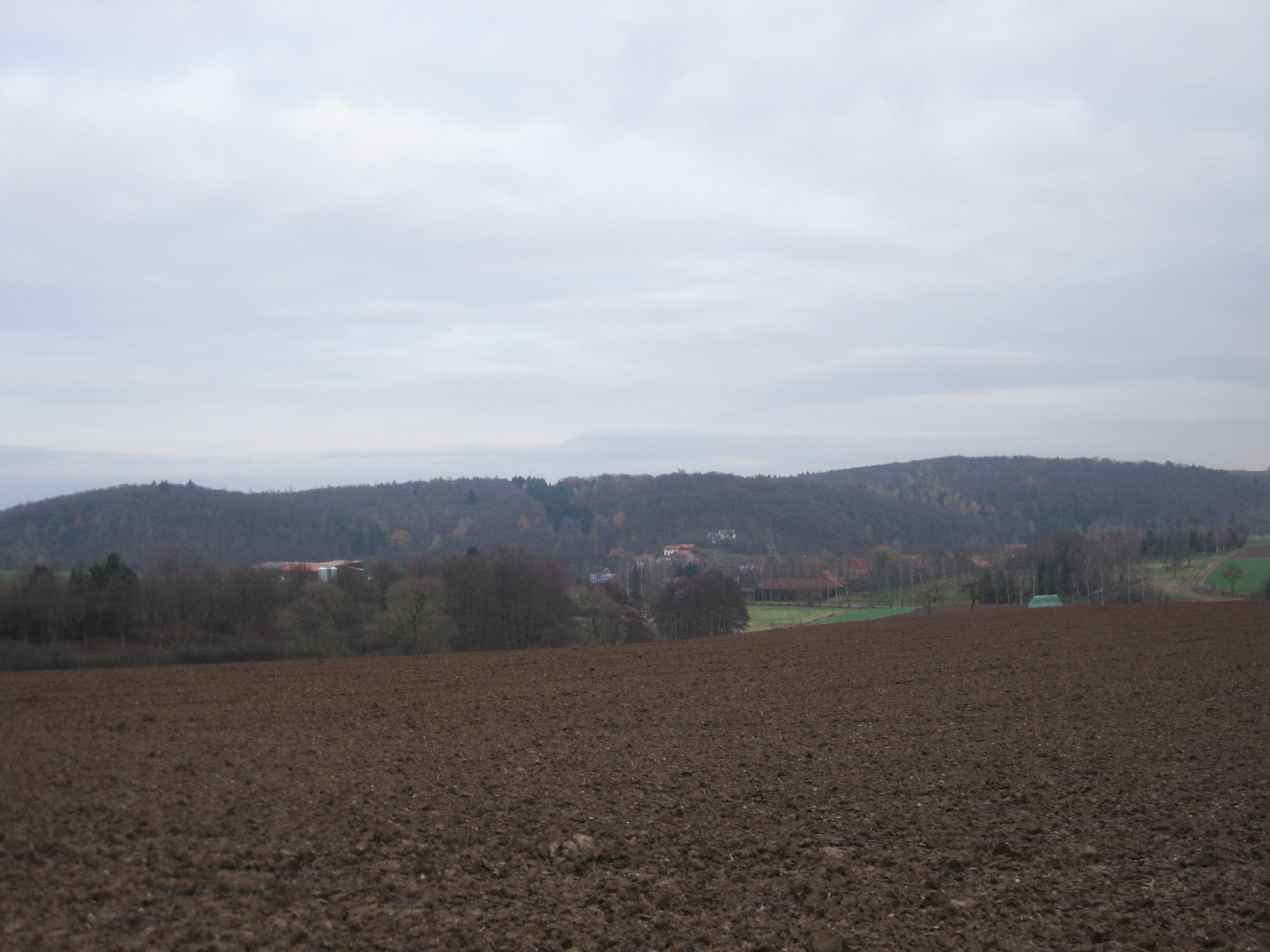
Etzenborn

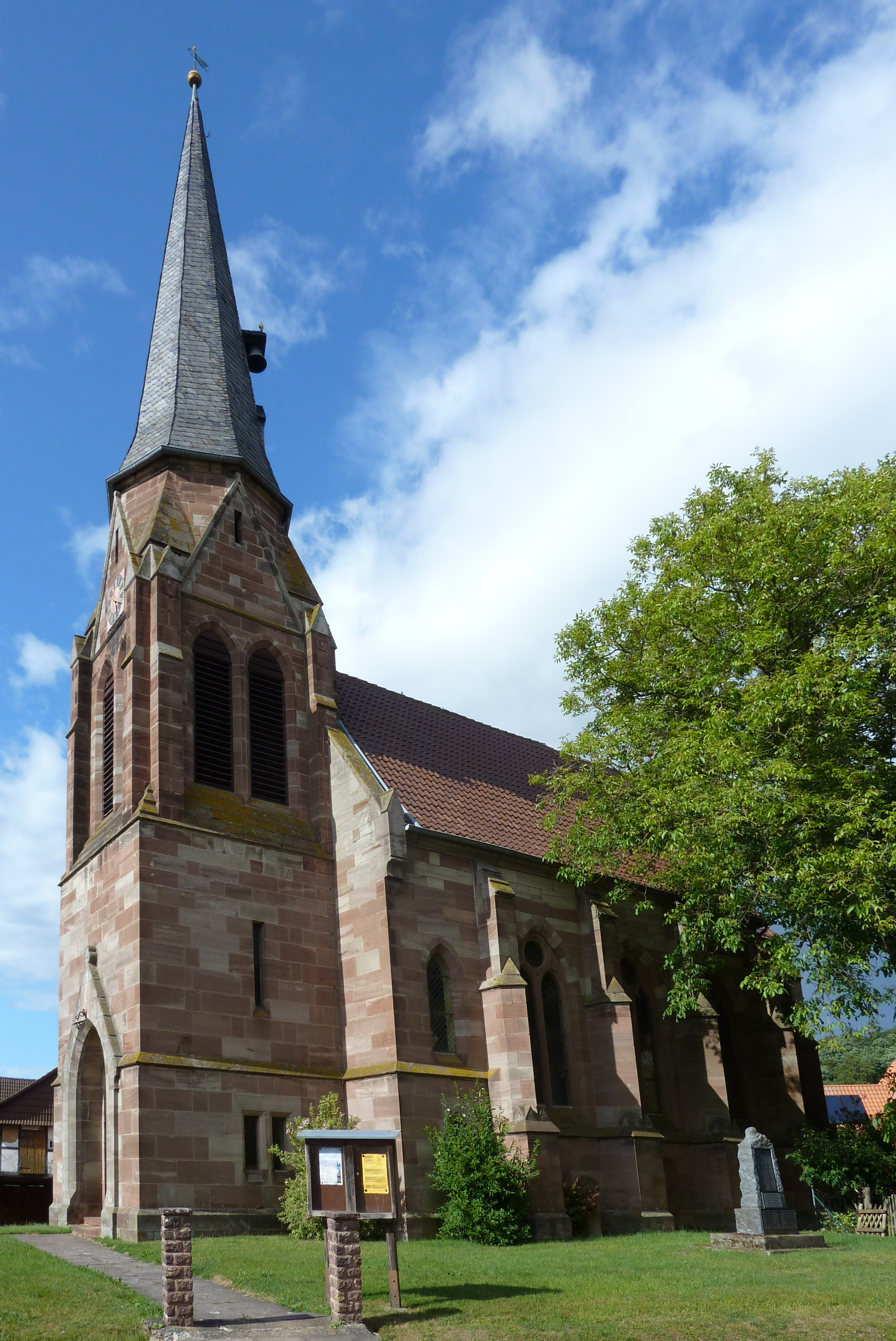
Etzenborn Reformed Church

The agricultural village had 216 inhabitants on the last day of 2010. The village, called Eghenburnen in the fourteenth and fifteenth centuries, before it was abandoned, was rebuilt around 1534 . The village lies in a valley surrounded by the forested hills Stadtberg, Hunoldsberg, Gehlenberg, Silberberg, Klafterberg, and das Rote Ufer. The fields and hills are traversed by farm roads and paths.

The village lies on Kreisstrasse 44. The nearest large city is Göttingen, the Landkreis capital, about 25 km to the north-west by road, with Duderstadt just 12 km to the north-east and Heiligenstadt the same distance south.

The one church in the community was built around the end of the 19th century. The single-nave edifice is in neo-Gothic style. It serves the Reformed (Calvinist) congregation of the community.

Community organizations include Schützenverein e.V. 1924, a mixed chorus, a sports club, and volunteer fire fighters.
