= Garte =

River in Germany

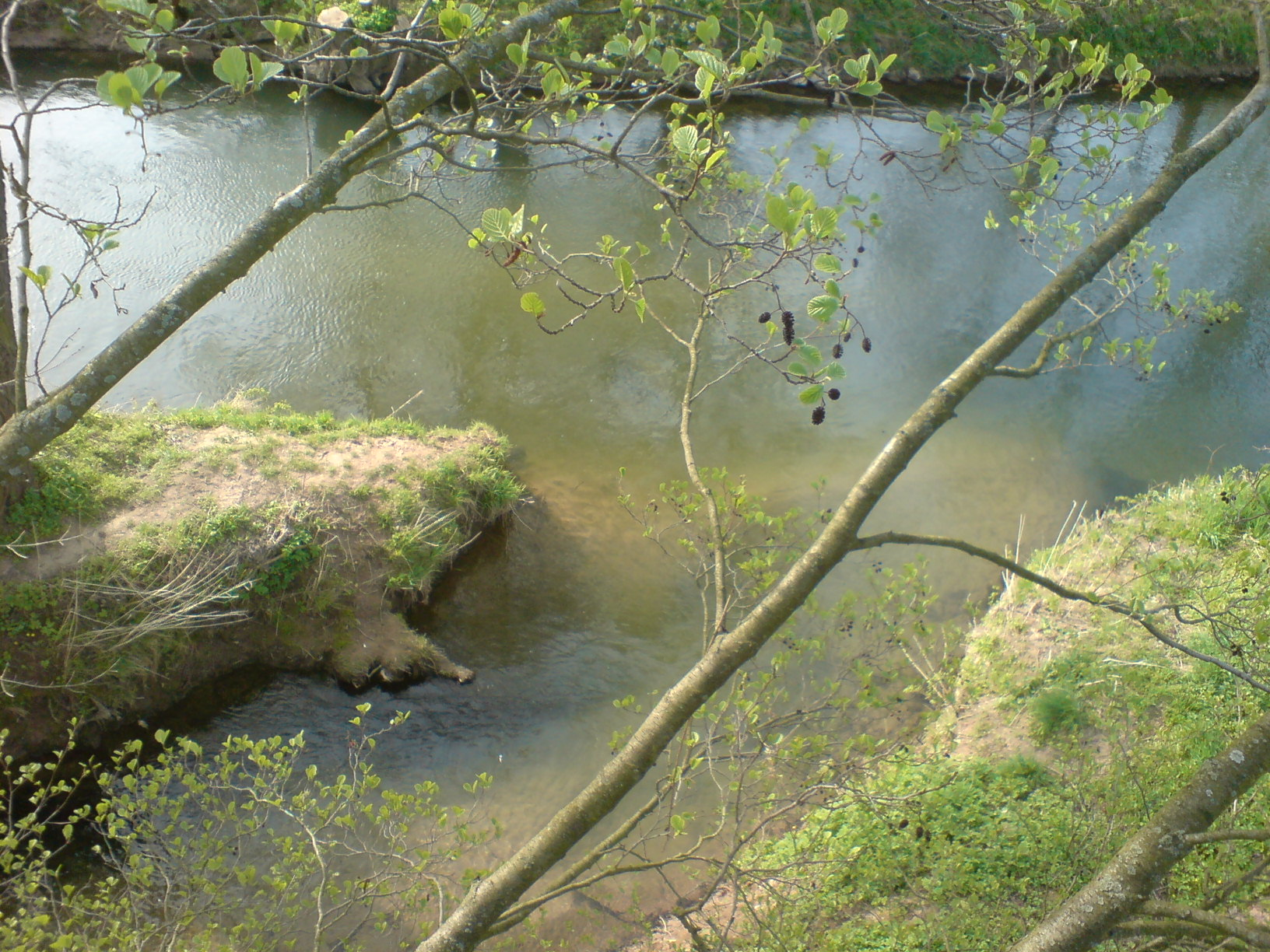
- Mouth of the Garte into the Leine south of Göttingen

Location
- Country: Germany
- State: Lower Saxony
- District: Göttingen

Physical characteristics
- Source
  - location: east of Weißenborn at the confluence of two streams
  - elevation: 303 m above sea level (NN)
- Mouth
  - location: south of Göttingen into the Leine
  - coordinates: 51°30′16″N 9°55′09″E
  - elevation: 152 m above sea level (NN)
- Length: 23.9 km (14.9 mi)
- Basin size: 89 km^{2} (34 sq mi)

Basin features
- Progression: Leine→ Aller→ Weser→ North Sea
- Tributaries
  - left: Moosgrund, Bischhauser Bach
  - right: Glasehausener Bach, Bernsroder Bach, Bramke, Lengder Bach, Eichbach

The Garte is a small tributary to the Leine River in Lower Saxony, Germany.

The Garte is a 23 km (14 mi) long stream that rises to the east of Weißenborn at an elevation of 303 m above sea level (NN). Towns that it runs through or by include Beienrode, Kerstlingerode, Rittmarshausen (where it is joined by the Bernsroder Bach), Wöllmarshausen, Benniehausen (where the Bischhäuser Bach joins it), Klein Lengden (where the Bramke and Eichbach join it), and Diemarden. The stream joins the Leine River south of Göttingen. With a drop of 151 m, the stream averages a bed slope of 6.6‰. The watershed is 87 km^{2} (34 sq mi). It is classified as a third-order (i.e., lowest) stream according to the German system of body-of-water ranking.

The river valley is considered locally as something of a micro-cultural unit, especially solidified by the now-defunct Garte Valley Railway, a 750 mm narrow-gauge railway running from Göttingen to Duderstadt.

== Tributaries ==
from source to mouth

- (unnamed stream, from Weißenborn) (L)
- Glasehauser Bach (R)
- Moosgrund (L)
- Bernsroder Bach (R)
- Bischhäuser Bach (L)
- Bramke (R)
- Lengder Bach (R)
- Eichbach (R)

== See also ==
- List of rivers of Lower Saxony
