= Beienrode =

Village in Germany

Coordinates: 51°28′N 10°07′E

Beienrode (German pronunciation: [baɪənˈʁoːdə]) is a village in the municipality (Gemeinde) Gleichen in the district Göttingen, Germany. The nucleated village of 250 residents (as of December 31, 2005) is primarily agricultural. The village mayor is Marlene Hille. The village's escutcheon is of a green linden tree on a silver background.

== History ==
The village was settled in the High Middle Ages, some time after 1100. The local church was founded in 1432, probably after or about the time the village gained nominal independence from Kerstlingerode, though the church remained an affiliate of the Kerstlingerode church. During the suzerainty battles of the period 1592–1620, the Mainz forces occupied and severely aggrieved the community. In the ensuing Thirty Years' War, the village also suffered, with the dragoons and their horses beggaring the community.

The village church edifice, like so many in the region, dates from the century after the Thirty Years' War. St. Bartholomäi was constructed in 1732.

In 1907 the Garte Valley Railway (Gartetalbahn) was extended from Rittmarshausen to Duderstadt, taking in Beienrode. In 1931, the service between Rittmarshausen and Duderstadt was discontinued due to low use and revenue.

Pursuant to the redistricting law of 1972, on New Year's Day 1973 Beienrode became part of the new Gemeinde Gleichen.

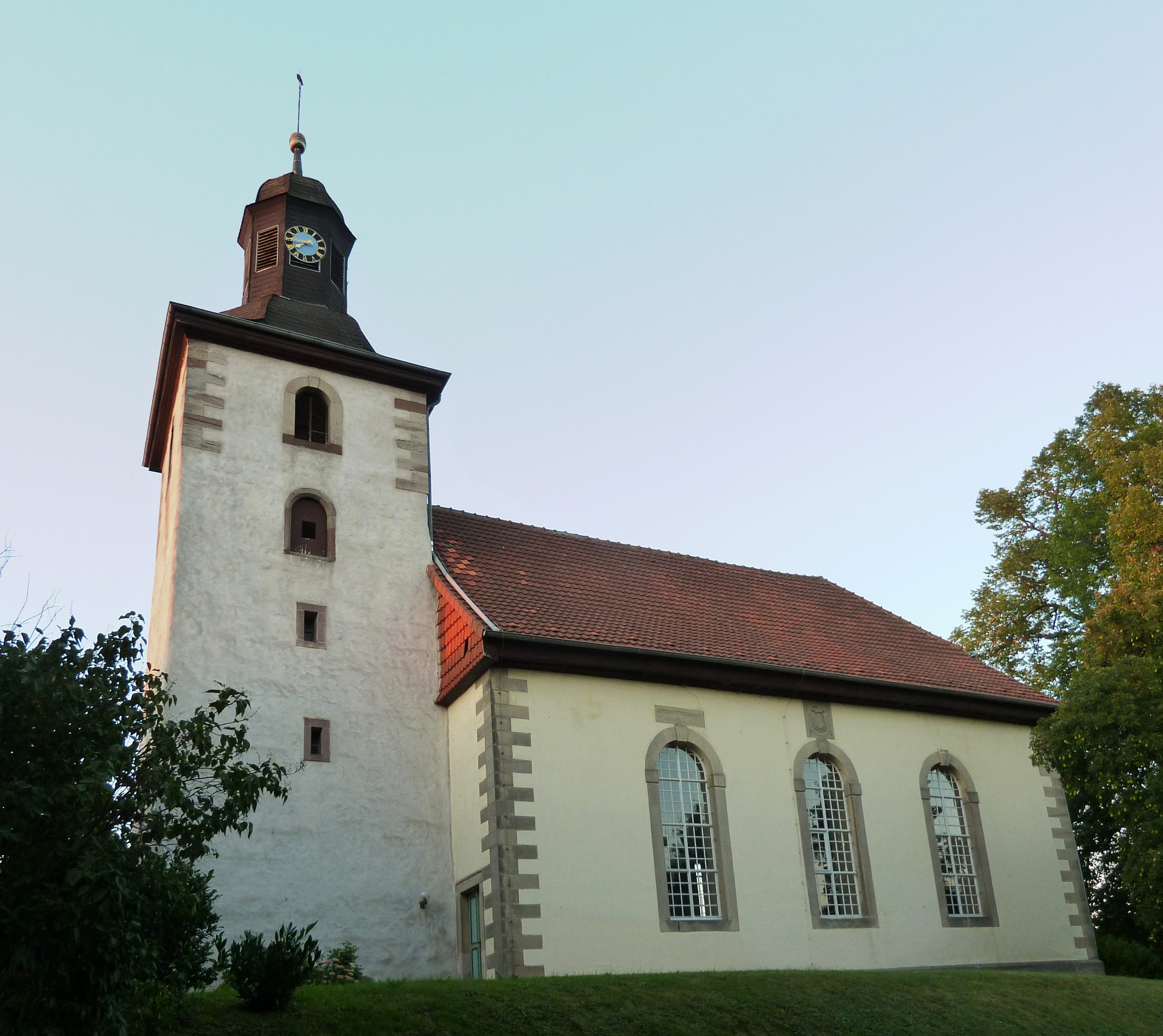
StBartholomaei Beienrode

== Government ==
=== Village Council ===
The village council (Ortsrat) is an elected body consisting of the mayor and four further members.

=== Mayor ===
The current mayor of the village is Andrea Kerll.

== Civic life ==
There are three official organizations in the community: a men's choir, a marksmanship club (Schützenverein), and a community fire department.

== Demographics ==
In 1800, there were about 280 residents. In 2010, there were 224.
