= Bremke =

- Village of Gleichen
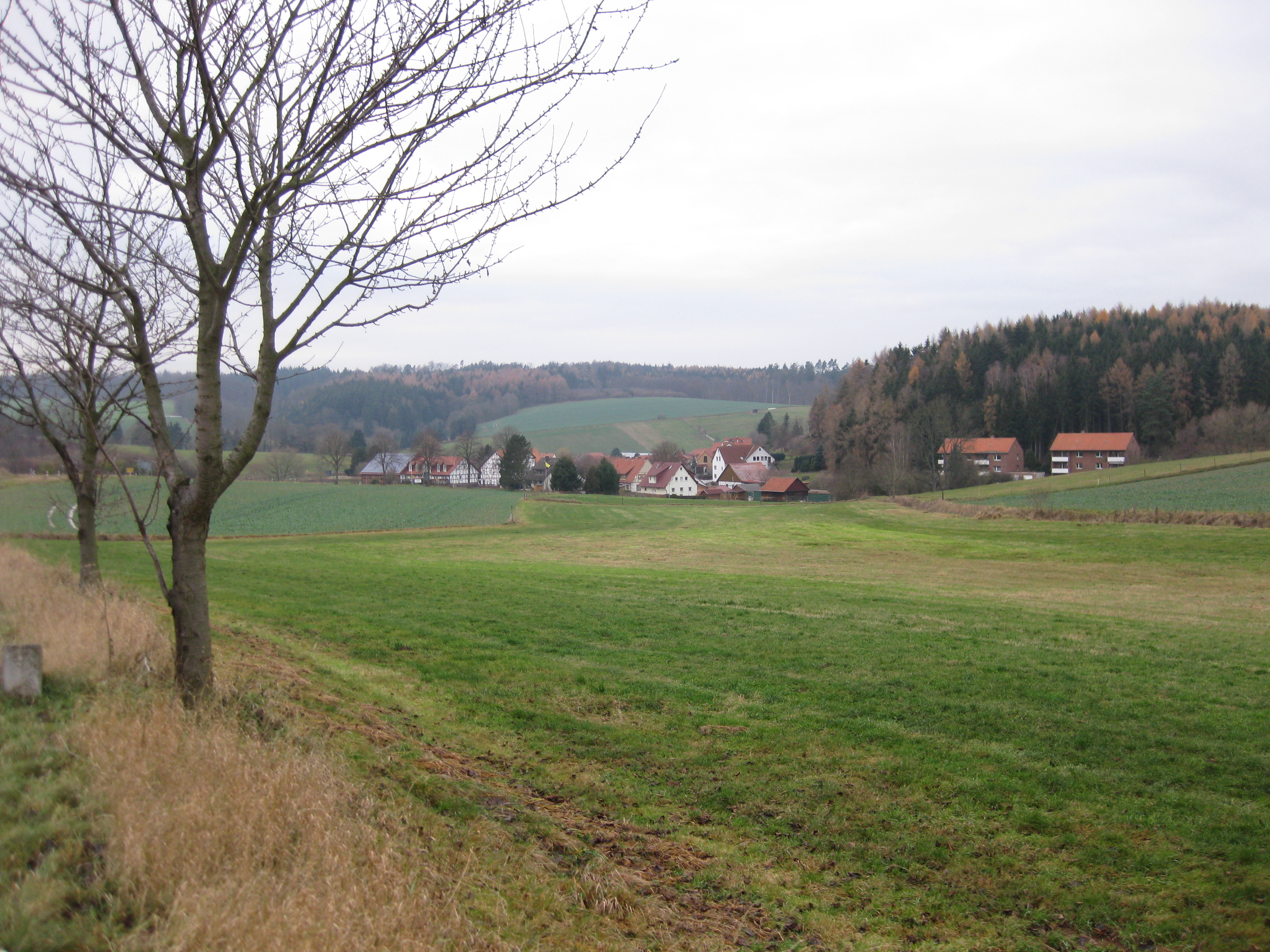

- Coat of arms
- Interactive map of Bremke
- Location within Germany Location within Lower Saxony
- Coordinates: 51°26′49″N 10°2′37″E
- Country: Germany
- State: Lower Saxony
- Admin. region: Braunschweig
- District: Göttingen
- Municipality: Gleichen

Population (2025)
  - Total: 736
- Time zone: UTC+01:00 (CET)
  - Summer (DST): UTC+02:00 (CEST)
- Postal codes: 37130
- Dialling codes: 05592
- Vehicle registration: GÖ
- Website: www.gleichen.digital/doerfer/bremke/

Bremke is a village in the Gemeinde Gleichen in southern Lower Saxony.

The village of 814 residents is located about ten kilometers south-east of Göttingen and lies in the shadow of the two small mountains called the Gleichen for the castles that once stood on their peaks. Bremke is the location of an outdoor stage, the Brüder Grimm Waldbühne, built in 1949, which stages performances in the summer. The local synagogue was destroyed during Kristallnacht in 1938, and the last of the small number of Jews living in the village left the following year. On Eschenberg there are remnants of the village's Jewish cemetery.

== Government ==
The village mayor is Karin Jürgens.

== Education ==
There is a public elementary school (Grundschule) in the village.
