= Bischhausen =

Village in Germany

Coordinates: 51°026′051″N 10°04′057″E

Bischhausen is a village in the Gemeinde Gleichen in southern Lower Saxony with a population of 326 (as of 1 January 2024). The village is located close to the previous border with what was the GDR and near the peaks called the Gleichen, with their castle ruins. It consists almost entirely of residences - primarily those of farmer families and of commuters to Göttingen. In addition, there is a very small village pond and the Lutheran church of St. Martin with its Late Gothic wooden sculpture. The first mention of the community was in 1152, when it was referred to as Biscopenhusen, "Bishop's houses."

The church was built in 1740–42 under the direction of master builder Jost Philipp.

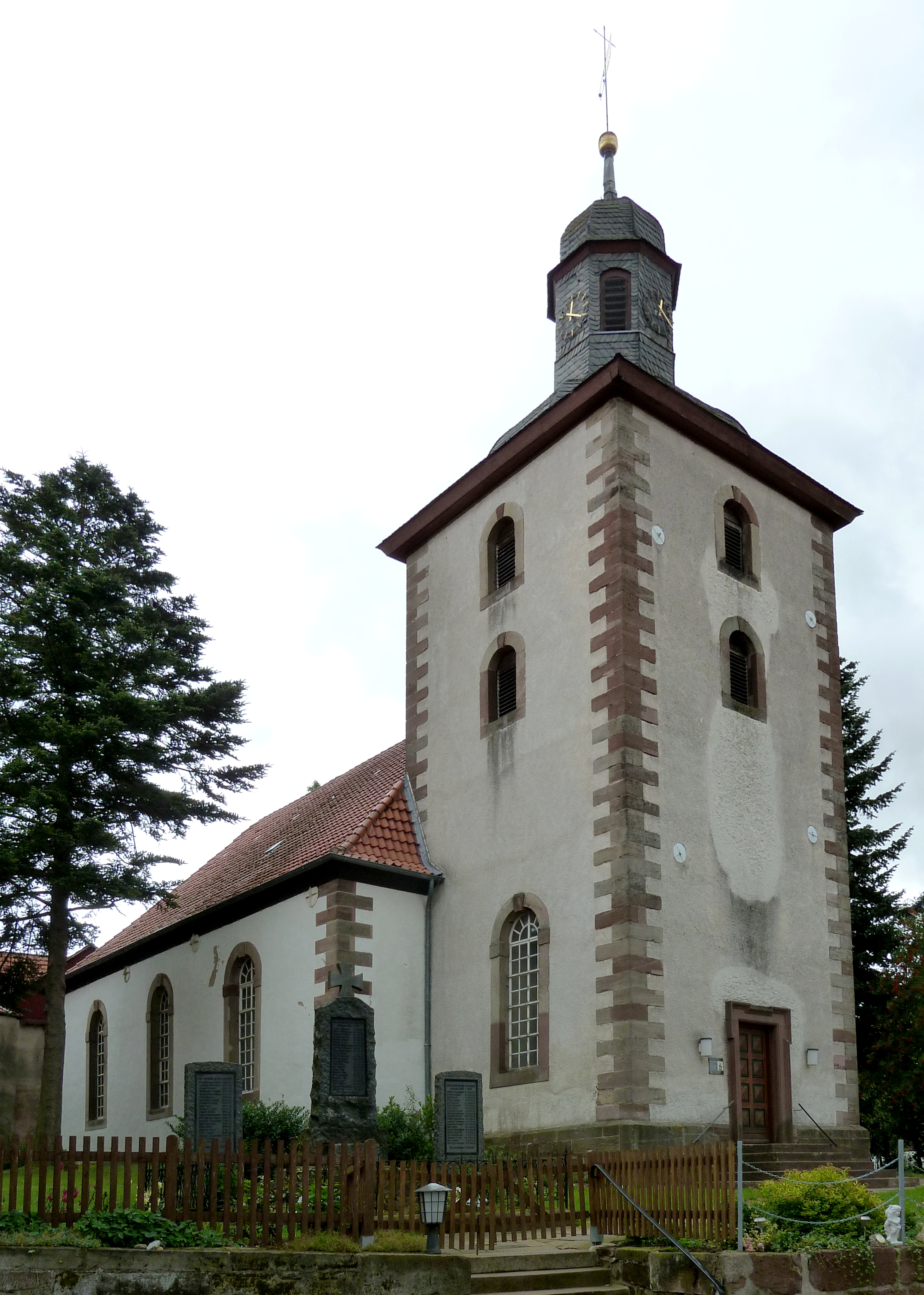
St. Martini, Bischhausen

In 1971, as part of administrative re-districting, the village was made part of the Gemeinde Gleichen.

During the days of the Cold War, the village abutted East Germany, and patrol wagons would drive through the village at night. There was no open crossing in this part of Germany, so the village was almost devoid of traffic not ending or starting there.

The mayor is Michael Dusch.
