= Kerstlingerode =

Coordinates: 51°28′N 10°06′E

Kerstlingerode is a village in the municipality (Gemeinde) Gleichen in the district Göttingen, Germany. It lies on L569 between Beienrode and Rittmarshausen, about ten kilometers south-east of Göttingen. The village of 245 residents (as of December 31, 2010) is primarily agricultural. There is one church and the largest school in the municipality. There is a volunteer fire department and a wind-instrument band. The village mayor is Sabine Lorch.

== History ==
The community was once known as Burg Kerstlingerode. It is said to have been founded in AD 1100.

In 1408 the knight of Bischoffshausen laid waste to some of the lands of Kerstlingerode.

In 1925 and 1933, the population was recorded as being 315 people. In 1939 it was 307.
