= Gross Lengden =

Village in Lower Saxony, Germany

Coordinates: 51°31′N 10°02′E

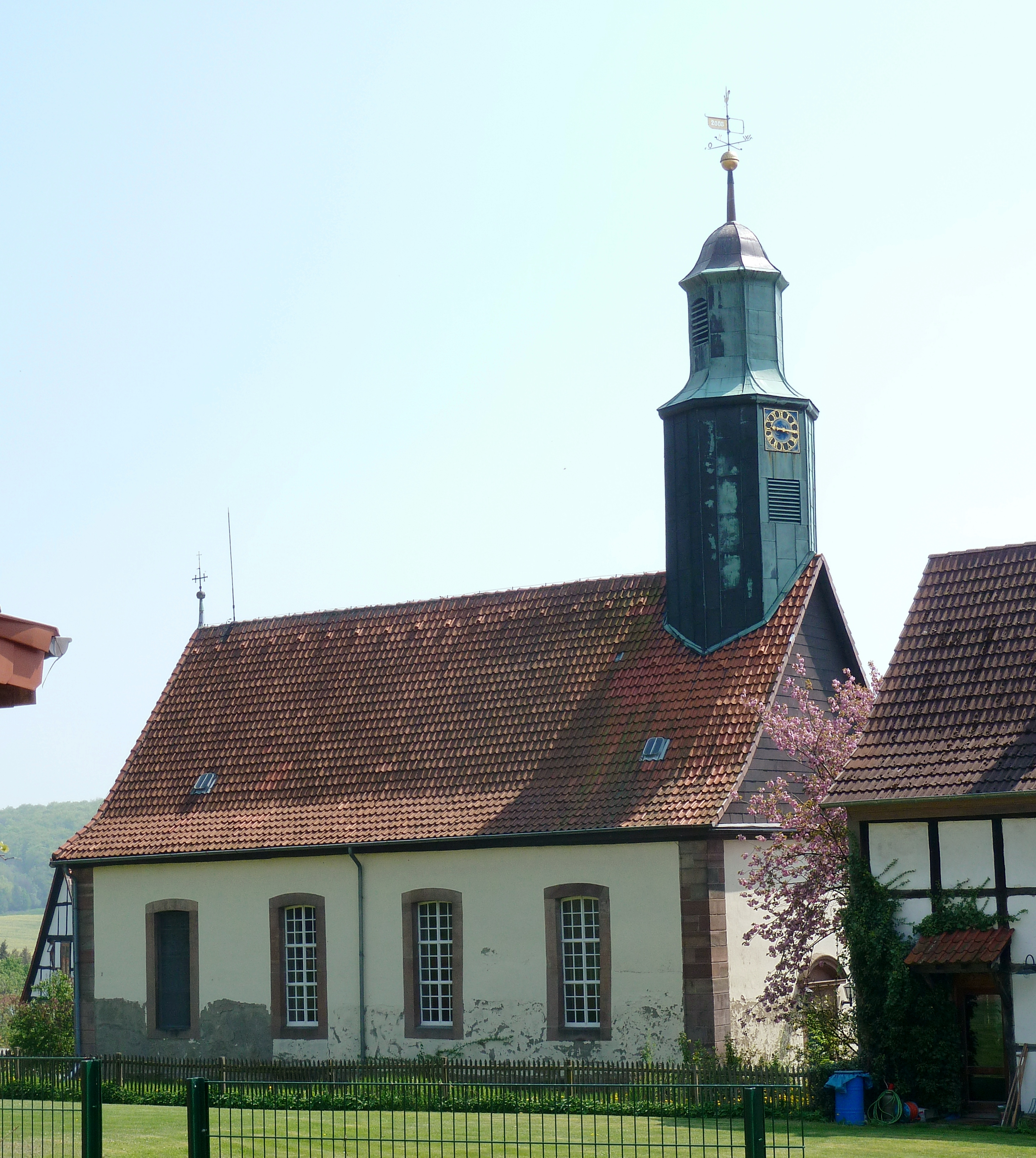
Village church

Gross Lengden is a village in the Gleichen in the Göttingen district of Lower Saxony, Germany, about ten kilometers east of Göttingen. It had 1,040 inhabitants as of 2005. The village lies at the foot of the hills leading to the Mackenröder Spitze.

The village's heart is characterized by small winding streets and well-preserved half-timbered houses. In two years running (1996, 1997), it won prizes for improved village appearance.

The earliest mention of the community is an AD 822 chronicle of the Fulda Abbey, where it is referred to as "Lengidi" and "Lengithi.“

== Government ==
- Mayor: Joachim Johannes Thiery

== Significant people associated with Gross Lengden ==
- Heinrich Albert Lion (born in Bamberg in 1796; died in Groß Lengden in 1867), Classical philologist
- Friedrich Ernst Fehsenfeld (1853–1933), co-founder of the Karl-May-Verlag publishing house

== Sources ==
- Das bietet Groß Lengden: http://www.gleichen.de/gr-lengden/home.htm

- Gross Lengden: http://www.gross-lengden.de/
