= Falkenhagen (Landolfshausen) =

Coordinates: 51°31′14″N 10°05′59″E

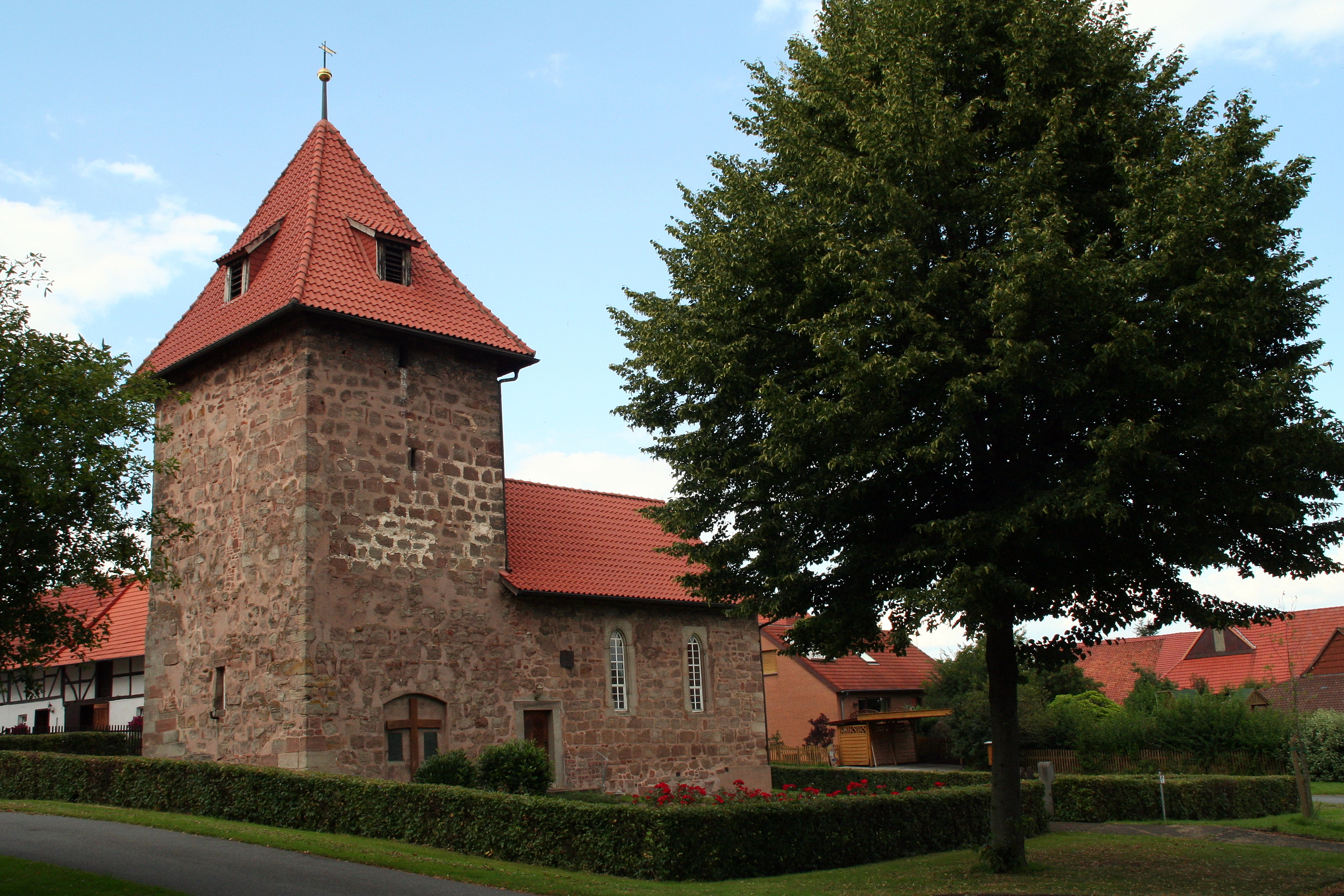
Church in Falkenhagen

Falkenhagen is a village in the municipality Landolfshausen, in the district of Göttingen of Lower Saxony, Germany.
