= Friedland, Lower Saxony =

Friedland
- Municipality
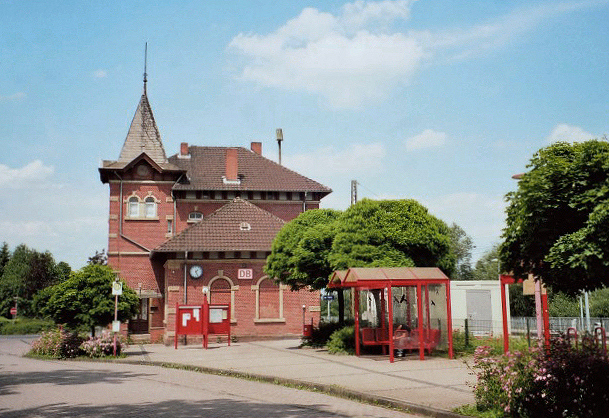
- Friedland railway station in May 2007

- Coat of arms

- Location of Friedland within Göttingen district
- Interactive map of Friedland
- Location within Germany Location within Lower Saxony
- Coordinates: 51°25′18″N 09°54′52″E
- Country: Germany
- State: Lower Saxony
- District: Göttingen
- Subdivisions: 14 districts

Government
  - Mayor (2021–26): Andreas Friedrichs (SPD)

Area
  - Total: 75.87 km^{2} (29.29 sq mi)
- Elevation: 181 m (594 ft)

Population (2025-12-31)
  - Total: 9,060
  - Density: 119/km^{2} (309/sq mi)
- Time zone: UTC+01:00 (CET)
  - Summer (DST): UTC+02:00 (CEST)
- Postal codes: 37133
- Dialling codes: 05504
- Vehicle registration: GÖ, DUD, HMÜ, OHA
- Website: www.friedland.de

Friedland (German pronunciation: [ˈfʁiːtˌlant]) is a municipality in the district of Göttingen, in Lower Saxony, Germany. It is situated on the river Leine, approx. 13 km south of Göttingen. Its seat is in the village of Groß Schneen, one of fourteen communities in the municipality. The others are Friedland proper, Ballenhausen, Deiderode, Elkershausen, Klein Schneen, Lichtenhagen, Ludolfshausen, Mollenfelde, Niedergandern, Niedernjesa, Reckershausen, Reiffenhausen and Stockhausen.

== Friedland Refugee Camp ==
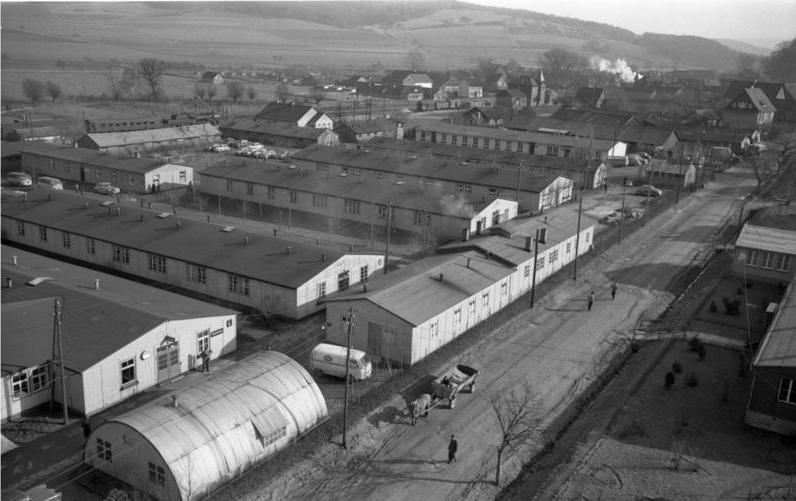
Part of Friedland Refugee Camp in February 1958

In September 1945, the Control Commission for Germany - British Element (CCG/BE) built a camp in Friedland, near the American (Hesse) and Soviet occupation (Thuringia) zones. The camp was designed as the first way station for refugees, evacuees, and returning soldiers. Starting in 1947, the camp was administered by the federal state of Lower Saxony. During the period of mass expulsions from 1944 to 1945, the camp offered services to large waves of refugees. Thereafter, it functioned primarily as a way station for German (or ethnic German) emigrants from Eastern bloc countries, especially from Poland, Romania, and the Soviet Union. Between 1950 and 1987, approximately 1.4 million people of German extraction came to the Federal Republic from the East; more than 60% of these emigrants came from Poland. Today Friedland is an initial reception center for asylum seekers and refugees from all over the world.

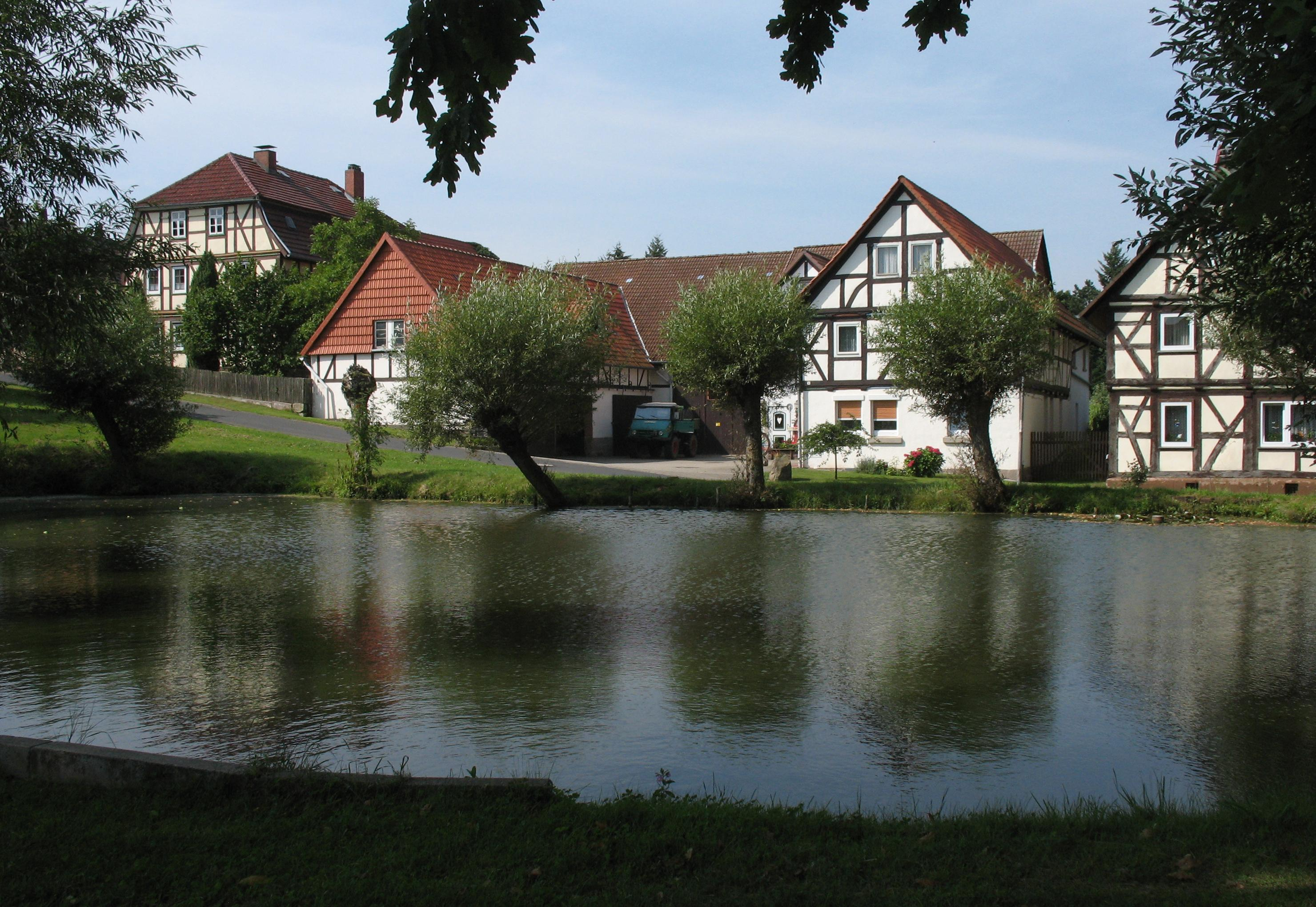
Lichtenhagen

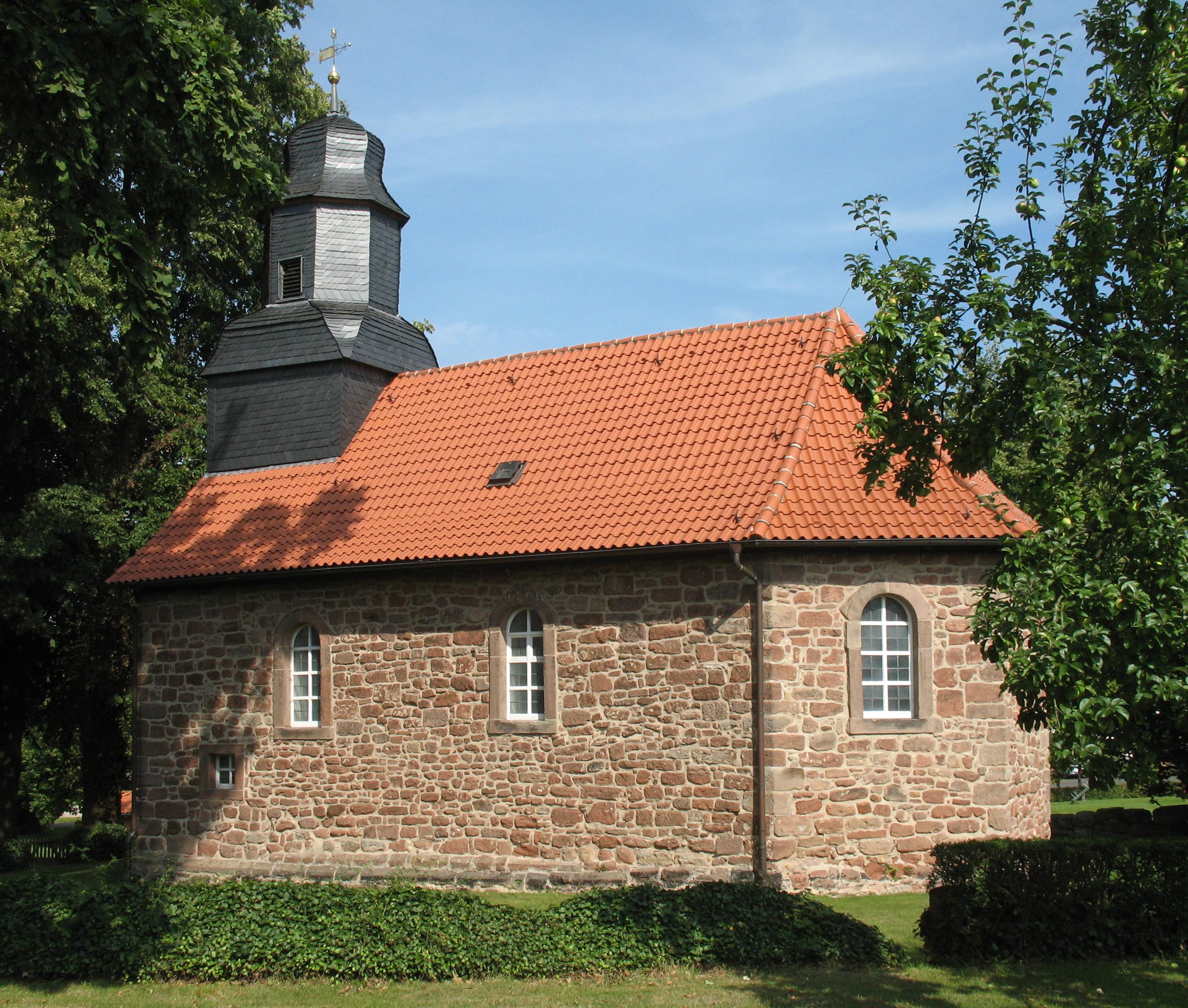
Church in Lichtenhagen
