= Landolfshausen =

- Municipality
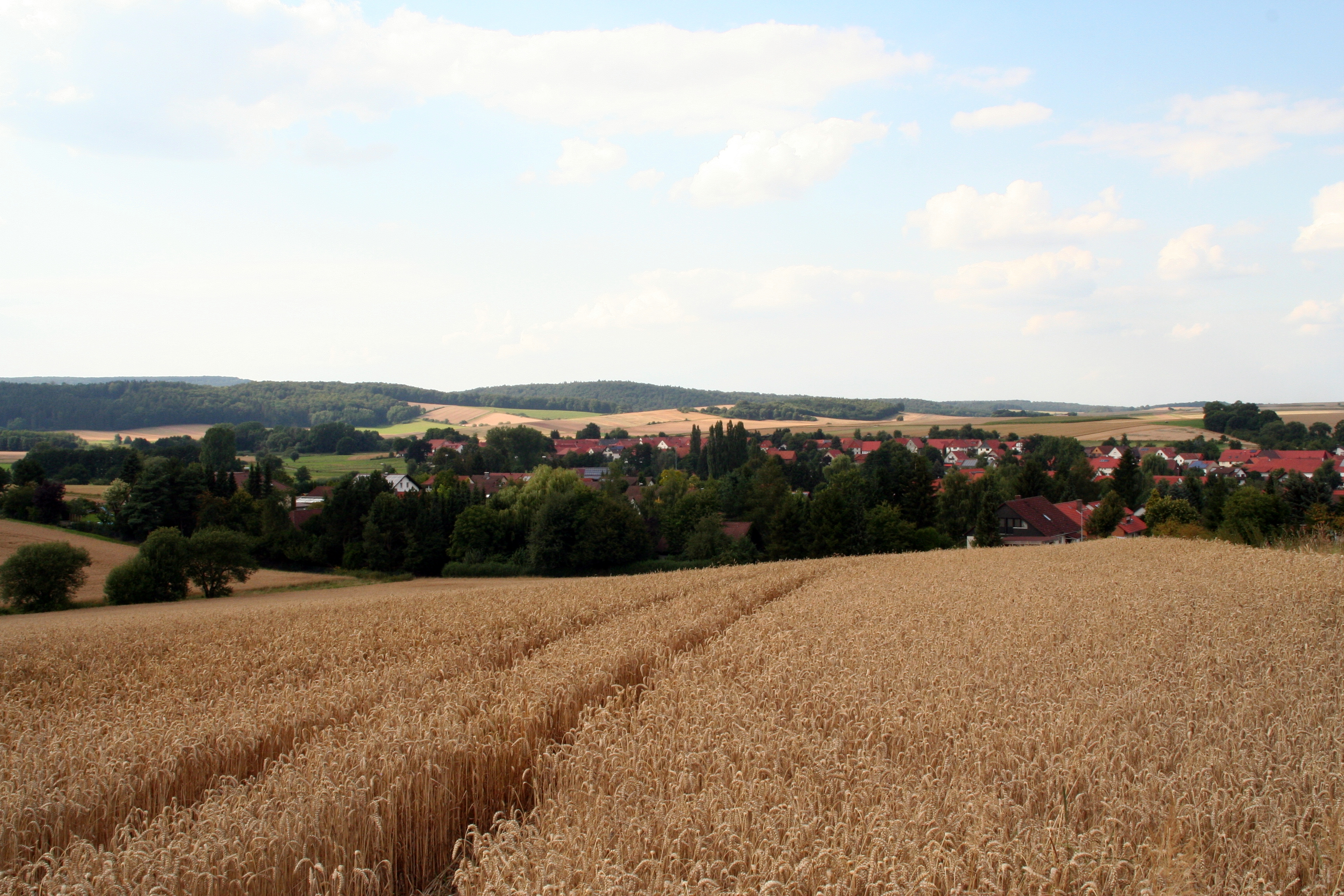

- Coat of arms

- Location of Landolfshausen within Göttingen district
- Interactive map of Landolfshausen
- Location within Germany Location within Lower Saxony
- Coordinates: 51°31′N 10°5′E
- Country: Germany
- State: Lower Saxony
- District: Göttingen
- Municipal assoc.: Radolfshausen
- Subdivisions: 3 districts

Government
  - Mayor: Günther Schlieper

Area
  - Total: 16.22 km^{2} (6.26 sq mi)
- Elevation: 204 m (669 ft)

Population (2025-12-31)
  - Total: 1,088
  - Density: 67.08/km^{2} (173.7/sq mi)
- Time zone: UTC+01:00 (CET)
  - Summer (DST): UTC+02:00 (CEST)
- Postal codes: 37136
- Dialling codes: 05507
- Vehicle registration: GÖ
- Website: www.landolfshausen.de

Landolfshausen is a municipality in the district of Göttingen, in Lower Saxony, Germany. One of the constituent villages of the municipality is Falkenhagen.
