= Benniehausen =

Human settlement in Germany

Coordinates: 51°29′N 10°03′E

Benniehausen is a village in the Gemeinde Gleichen in southern Lower Saxony.

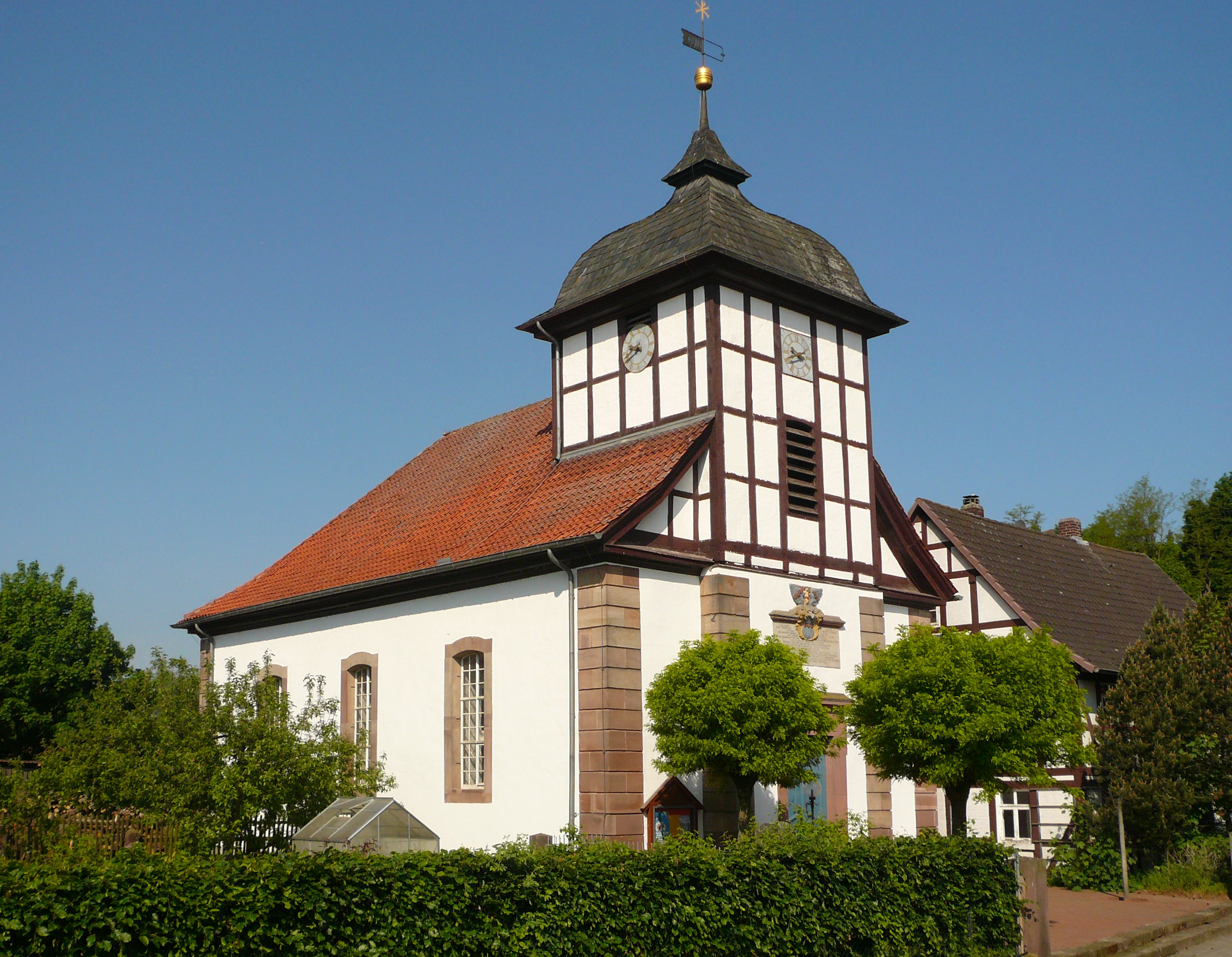
Church Benniehausen

The village of 349 residents (in 2010) is located in the Gartetal {valley} on the old trade route between Göttingen and Duderstadt, lying some eight kilometers south-west of the former city. Construction of the village's half-timbered church began in 1779. The community has a prize-winning volunteer fire department. Community organizations include a senior citizens club (Altenclub Benniehausen).

Benniehausen and the surrounding area have been inhabited since the Paleolithic. In nearby Niedeck, there is the ruin of an ancient fort, which was excavated in the 1990s

The mayor is Dirk Otter.
