= Rittmarshausen =

Village in Göttingen, Germany

Coordinates: 51°29′N 10°06′E

Rittmarshausen is a nucleated village in the municipality (Gemeinde) Gleichen in the district Göttingen, Germany. The village of 776 residents (as of December 31, 2005) is primarily agricultural and home of people working in Göttingen. "Ökozentrum Rittmarshausen" is an association dedicated to the development and marketing of regionally produced natural foods, which are marketed under the Leinehöfe label. The community also sports an athletic association, a volunteer fire department, a chorus, a gun club, and an equestrian association.

The village mayor is Volker Heinemann.

The village's coat of arms is a red shield with a bird sitting on the upper of two yellow horizontal bars, each with three short vertical bars (crenellations).

== History ==
The village was settled by people from the now-abandoned village of Bernsrode due, according to tradition, to flooding at Bernsrode. In 1318 the village was the split property of Dietrich von Kerstlingerode and Ehrenfriede von Berlepsch. The Rittmarshausen "Palace" (Das Rittmarshäuser Schloss) replaced a castle first built in AD 1541 in the early 18th century, being completed in 1716. Extensive underground passages were also built beneath the edifice, though when is not certain. The village church is said to have been built from the stones of the one in abandoned village. The first services weren't held in the church until the early 17th century. Although the village has been predominantly Protestant (Lutheran) since the thirty Years War, a Roman Catholic community exists in the community and has, since 1997, had its own church, serving all twelve Gartetal villages.

The Garte Gericht (regional court) had its seat in the village until 1839.

A brewery was established in the Rittmarshausen Palace in 1852, but production of alcohol was discontinued in the first part of the 20th century.

Toward the end of the 19th century, a narrow-gauge railway linking the Gartetal to Goettingen was built. This, the Gartetalbahn, served the city's population—especially the students—as a convenient excursion vehicle to rural Gaststaetten as well as a means for the residents of Rittmarshausen and the villages along the way to get to market in the city. In 1957, passenger service was discontinued, and a year later the beet service ended and the tracks were torn up. The train station still stands, currently in private ownership.
