= List of mountain and hill ranges in Germany =

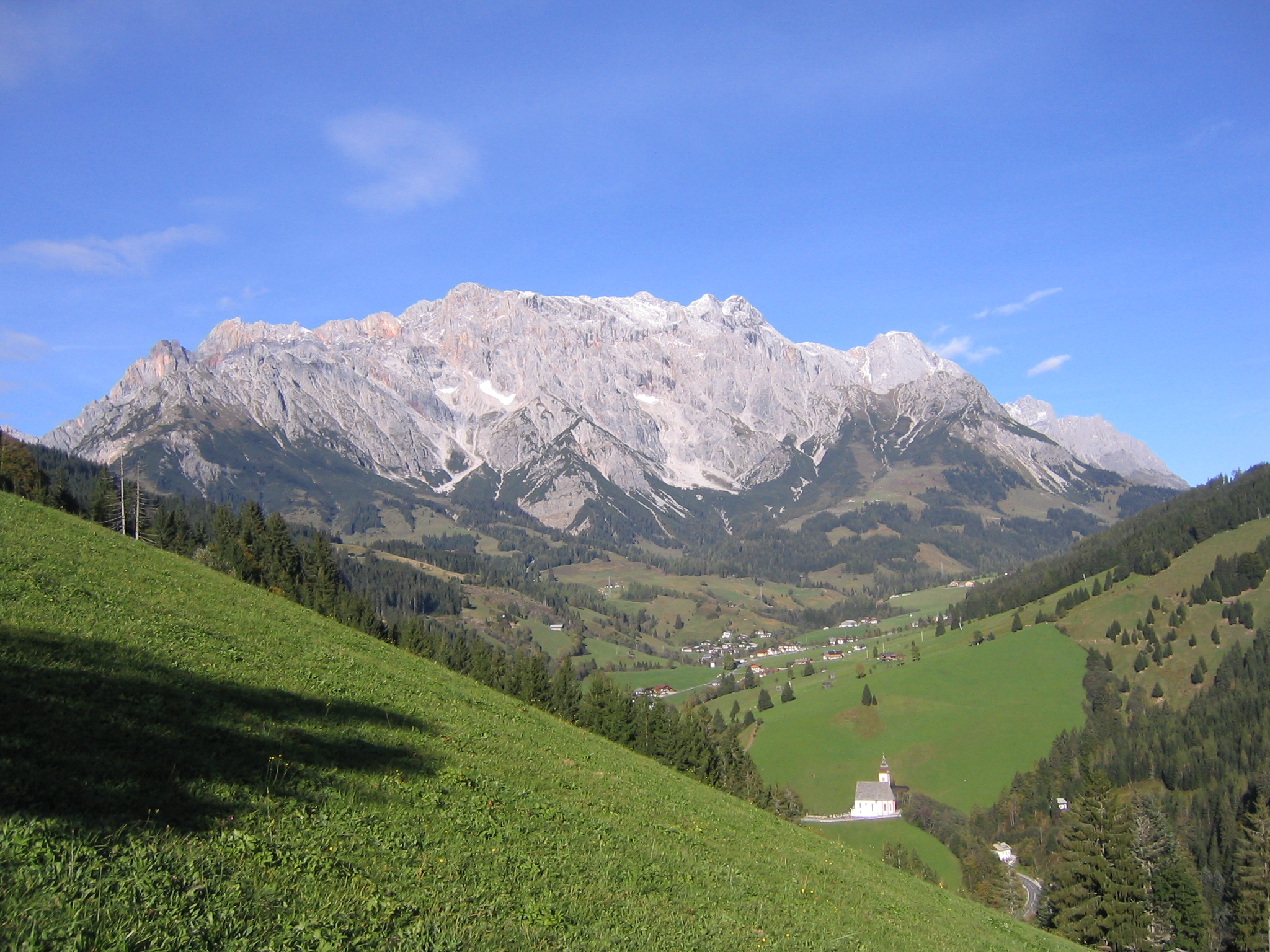
The Hochkönig in the Berchtesgaden Alps

This list of mountain and hill ranges in Germany contains a selection of the main mountain and hill regions in Germany.

In addition the list shows the highest (German) mountain in the range together with its height above sea level (taken as Normalnull (NN)) and the state in which its highest elevation is located. If the highest feature extends into neighbouring states, it is possible, that there are higher summits located there.

The same hill or mountain may be listed more than once; for example the Zugspitze, Germany's highest mountain, belongs to the Alps, the Bavarian Alps, the Northern Limestone Alps and the Wetterstein Mountains.

The ranges are listed in alphabetical order.

Mountain or hill range	Highest peak	Height above NN		State
Mountain or hill range	Highest peak	m	ft	State
Adelegg	Schwarzer Grat	1,118	3,668	Baden-Württemberg
Ahlsburg	Sackberg	411.4	1,350	Lower Saxony
Ahr Hills	Aremberg	623	2,044	Rhineland-Palatinate
Allgäu Alps	Hochfrottspitze	2,649	8,691	Bavaria
Alps	Zugspitze	2,962	9,718	Bavaria
Altdorf Forest	unnamed summit	777	2,549	Baden-Württemberg
Amtsberge	Belzer Berg	392.2	1,287	Lower Saxony
Ankum Heights	Trillenberg	140	460	Lower Saxony
Arnsberg Forest	unnamed summit	581.3	1,907	North Rhine-Westphalia
Atzenberg Heights	unnamed summit	707	2,320	Baden-Württemberg
Baumberge	Westerberg	187	614	North Rhine-Westphalia
Bavarian Alps	Zugspitze	2,962	9,718	Bavaria
Bavarian Forest	Großer Arber	1,456	4,777	Bavaria
Beckum Hills	Mackenberg	173	568	North Rhine-Westphalia
Berchtesgaden Alps	Watzmann	2,713	8,901	Bavaria
Bergstraße	Melibokus	517	1,696	Hesse
Bergisches Land	Homert	519	1,703	North Rhine-Westphalia
Bingen Forest	Kandrich	637	2,090	Rhineland-Palatinate
Black Forest	Feldberg	1,493	4,898	Baden-Württemberg
Bleicherode Hills	Ziegenrück	460.8	1,512	Thuringia
Blauberge	Halserspitz	1,862.8	6,112	Bavaria
Borkenberge	Fischberg	134	440	North Rhine-Westphalia
Bramwald	Totenberg	408	1,339	Lower Saxony
Brohmer Berge	unnamed elevation near Matzdorf	152.9	502	Mecklenburg-Vorpommern
Bückeberg	Bückeberg	367	1,204	Lower Saxony
Burgberg	Großer Everstein	345.2	1,133	Lower Saxony
Burgwald	Knebelsrod	443	1,453	Hesse
Chiemgau Alps	Sonntagshorn	1,961	6,434	Bavaria
Damme Hills	Signalberg	146	479	Lower Saxony
Deister	Bröhn	405	1,329	Lower Saxony
Berge	Tannenbültenberg	104	341	North Rhine-Westphalia
Dinkelberg	Hohe Flum	535	1,755	Baden-Württemberg
Dollberge	Dollberg	695	2,280	Rhineland-Palatinate, Saarland
Dransfeld Municipal Forest	Hoher Hagen	508	1,667	Lower Saxony
Drawehn	Hoher Mechtin	142	466	Lower Saxony
Dresden Heath	Dachsenberg	281	922	Saxony
Duinger Berg	Babenstein	331	1,086	Lower Saxony
Dün	Rondel	522	1,713	Thuringia
Eastern Ore Mountains	Kahleberg	905	2,969	Saxony
Ebbe Mountains	Nordhelle	663	2,175	North Rhine-Westphalia
Egge Hills	Preußischer Velmerstot	468	1,535	North Rhine-Westphalia
Eifel	Hohe Acht	747	2,451	Rhineland-Palatinate
Elbe Sandstone Mountains	Großer Zschirnstein	562	1,844	Saxony
Elfas	Helleberg	410	1,350	Lower Saxony
Ellensen Forest	Scharfenberg	342	1,122	Lower Saxony
Ellwangen Hills	Hohenberg & Schönberg	569	1,867	Baden-Württemberg
Elster Mountains	Hoher Brand	805	2,641	Saxony
Ester Mountains	Krottenkopf	2,086	6,844	Bavaria
Fahner Heights	Abtsberg	413	1,355	Thuringia
Fichtel Mountains	Schneeberg	1,053	3,455	Bavaria
Finne	Künzelsberg	380	1,250	Thuringia
Franconian Forest	Döbraberg	794	2,605	Bavaria, Thuringia
Franconian Heights	Hornberg	554	1,818	Bavaria
Fläming Heath	Hagelberg	200.2	657	Brandenburg
Gatterberge		623	2,044	Bavaria
Gleichberge	Großer Gleichberg	679	2,228	Thuringia
Giesen Hills		162.6	533	Lower Saxony
Göttingen Forest	Mackenröder Spitze	427.5	1,403	Lower Saxony
Gröden Hills	Heidehöhe	201.4	661	Brandenburg
Großer Heuberg	Lemberg	1,015	3,330	Baden-Württemberg
Haarstrang	Spitze Warte	389	1,276	North Rhine-Westphalia
Habichtswald	Hohes Gras	614.7	2,017	Hesse
Hahnenkamm	Hesselberg	689	2,260	Bavaria
Hainberg	Kalter Buschkopf	299	981	Lower Saxony
Hainich	Alter Berg	494	1,621	Thuringia
Hainleite		464	1,522	Thuringia
Harburg Hills	Hülsenberg	155	509	Lower Saxony
Harly Forest	Harlyberg	256	840	Lower Saxony
Harplage		290	950	Lower Saxony
Harrl	Harrlberg	211	692	Lower Saxony
Harz	Brocken	1,141.1	3,744	Lower Saxony, Saxony-Anhalt, Thuringia
Haßberge	Nassacher Höhe	512.2	1,680	Bavaria
Heber	Mechtshäuser Berg	314	1,030	Lower Saxony
Heilingen Heights		368	1,207	Thuringia
Hellberge	Langer Berg	159.9	525	Saxony-Anhalt
Helpt Hills	Helpter Berg	179	587	Mecklenburg-Vorpommern
Hemberg	Hundskopf	471	1,545	Hesse
Hessisches Kegelspiel	Stallberg	553	1,814	Hesse
Hildesheim Forest	Griesberg	358.9	1,177	Lower Saxony
Hils	Bloße Zelle	480.4	1,576	Lower Saxony
Hochgeländ	unnamed summit	678	2,224	Baden-Württemberg
Högl	Högl	827	2,713	Bavaria
Hohe Mark	Waldbeerenberg	146	479	North Rhine-Westphalia
Hoher Meißner	Kasseler Kuppe	753.6	2,472	Hesse
Hohe Schrecke	Schulzenberg	320	1,050	Thuringia
Holstein Switzerland	Bungsberg	168	551	Schleswig-Holstein
Holzberg	Holzberg	444.5	1,458	Lower Saxony
Homburg Forest		406.1	1,332	Lower Saxony
Hörselberge	Großer Hörselberg	484	1,588	Thuringia
Hube	Fuchshöhlenberg	346	1,135	Lower Saxony
Hümmling	Windberg	73	240	Lower Saxony
Hunsrück	Erbeskopf	816	2,677	Rhineland-Palatinate
Hütten Hills	Scheelsberg	106	348	Schleswig-Holstein
Huy	Buchenberg	314	1,030	Saxony-Anhalt
Idar Forest	An den zwei Steinen/Kahlheid	766	2,513	Rhineland-Palatinate
Innerste Uplands	Griesberg	358.9	1,177	Lower Saxony
Ith	Lauensteiner Kopf	439	1,440	Lower Saxony
Kaiserstuhl	Totenkopf	557	1,827	Baden-Württemberg
Karwendel	Östliche Karwendelspitze	2,537	8,323	Bavaria
Kaufungen Forest	Bilstein	641.2	2,104	Hesse
Kellenberg	Kellenberg	77	253	Lower Saxony
Kellerwald	Wüstegarten	675	2,215	Hesse
Kiffing	Heuberg	344.1	1,129	Hesse
Kleiner Deister	Wolfsköpfe	345.7	1,134	Lower Saxony
Knüll	Eisenberg	636	2,087	Hesse
Königshain Hills	Ahlberg	411	1,348	Saxony
Kühlung	Diedrichshagener Berg	129.7	426	Mecklenburg-Vorpommern
Külf		260	850	Lower Saxony
Kyffhäuser	Kulpenberg	477	1,565	Thuringia
Lahnberge	Ortenberg	380	1,250	Hesse
Landrücken	Frauenstein	596	1,955	Hesse
Lange Berge	Buchberg	528	1,732	Bavaria
Lusatian Highlands	Valtenberg	586.6	1,925	Saxony
Laußnitz Heath	Hinterer Buchberg	245	804	Saxony
Latten Mountains	Karkopf	1,738	5,702	Bavaria
Leine Uplands	Bloße Zelle	480.4	1,576	Lower Saxony
Lenne Mountains	Homert	656	2,152	North Rhine-Westphalia
Lichtenberge	Adlershorst	254.2	834	Lower Saxony
Limpurg Hills	Altenberg	564.7	1,853	Baden-Württemberg
Lingen Heights	Windmühlenberg	91	299	Lower Saxony
Lippe Uplands	Köterberg	496	1,627	Lower Saxony, North Rhine-Westphalia
Little Thuringian Forest	Schneeberg	692	2,270	Thuringia
Löwenstein Hills	Stocksberg	538.9	1,768	Baden-Württemberg
Lüneburg Heath	Wilseder Berg	169.2	555	Lower Saxony
Lützelsoon	Womrather Höhe	597	1,959	Rhineland-Palatinate
Mainhardt Forest	Hohe Brach	586	1,923	Baden-Württemberg
Marburg Hills	Vogelheerd	369.8	1,213	Hesse
Märkisch Switzerland	Krugberg	129	423	Brandenburg
Melle Hills	Diedrichsburg	218	715	Lower Saxony
Moselberge	unnamed summit	434	1,424	Rhineland-Palatinate
Müggelberge	Großer Müggelberg	115.4	379	Berlin
Murrhardt Forest	Wüstenberg	544	1,785	Baden-Württemberg
Muskauer Faltenbogen	Hoher Berg	183	600	Brandenburg, Saxony
Muskau Heath		169	554	Saxony
Nesselberg	Grasberg	375	1,230	Lower Saxony
Northern Limestone Alps	Zugspitze	2,962	9,718	Bavaria
North Palatine Highland	Donnersberg	687	2,254	Rhineland-Palatinate
Upper Palatinate Forest	Gibacht	938	3,077	Bavaria
Odenwald	Katzenbuckel	626	2,054	Baden-Württemberg
Oderwald	Hungerberg	205	673	Lower Saxony
Ohm Hills	Birkenberg	533.4	1,750	Thuringia
Ore Mountains	Fichtelberg	1,215	3,986	Saxony
Osburger Hochwald	Rösterkopf	708	2,323	Rhineland-Palatinate
Osterwald	Fast	419	1,375	Lower Saxony
Palatinate Forest	Kalmit	673	2,208	Rhineland-Palatinate
Rammert	Hohwacht	590	1,940	Baden-Württemberg
Rauen Hills		153	502	Brandenburg
Rehburg Hills	Brunnenberg	161	528	Lower Saxony
Reinhardswald	Staufenberg	472.2	1,549	Hesse
Reinsberge	Reinsburg	604	1,982	Thuringia
Richelsdorf Hills	Herzberg	478.2	1,569	Hesse
Rhön	Wasserkuppe	950.2	3,117	Hesse
Rotenberg	Rotenberg	317.3	1,041	Lower Saxony
Rothaar Mountains	Langenberg	843.2	2,766	Hesse, North Rhine-Westphalia
Saxon Switzerland	Großer Zschirnstein	561	1,841	Saxony
Saalhausen Hills	Himberg	687.7	2,256	North Rhine-Westphalia
Sackwald	Ahrensberg	374	1,227	Lower Saxony
Salzgitter Hills	Vier Berge	322.9	1,059	Lower Saxony
Schelderwald	Angelburg	609	1,998	Hesse
Schlierbach Forest	Rabenkuppe	515	1,690	Hesse
Schmücke	Scharfer Berg	249	817	Thuringia
Schönbuch	Bromberg	583	1,913	Baden-Württemberg
Schurwald	Kernen	513.2	1,684	Baden-Württemberg
Swabian Jura	Lemberg	1,015	3,330	Baden-Württemberg
Schwarzwälder Hochwald	Erbeskopf	816	2,677	Rhineland-Palatinate, Saarland
Selter	Hohe Egge	395	1,296	Lower Saxony
Seulingswald	Toter Mann	480	1,570	Hesse
Sieben Berge	Hohe Tafel	395	1,296	Lower Saxony
Siebengebirge	Großer Ölberg	460.1	1,510	North Rhine-Westphalia
Solling	Große Blöße	528	1,732	Lower Saxony
Söhre	Hirschberg	643.4	2,111	Hesse
Soonwald	Ellerspring	657	2,156	Rhineland-Palatinate
Spaar Hills	Juchhöh	192	630	Saxony
Spessart	Geiersberg	586	1,923	Bavaria
Stemweder Berg	Scharfer Berg	181	594	North Rhine-Westphalia and Lower Saxony
Stölzingen Hills	Eisberg	583	1,913	Hesse
Stromberg	Baiselberg	477	1,565	Baden-Württemberg
Süntel	Hohe Egge	437.5	1,435	Lower Saxony
Süchtelner Höhe		90.7	298	North Rhine-Westphalia
Taunus	Großer Feldberg	878.5	2,882	Hesse
Teutoburg Forest	Barnacken	446	1,463	North Rhine-Westphalia
Thuringian Highland	Großer Farmdenkopf	869	2,851	Thuringia
Thuringian Forest	Großer Beerberg	982.9	3,225	Thuringia
Ville	Glessener Höhe	204	669	North Rhine-Westphalia
Virngrund	Hornberg	580	1,900	Baden-Württemberg
Vogelsberg	Taufstein	773	2,536	Hesse
Vogler	Ebersnacken	460.4	1,510	Lower Saxony
Vorberge	Hainberg	353	1,158	Lower Saxony
Vorholz	Knebelberg	243	797	Lower Saxony
Waldeck Forest	Weidelsberg	492	1,614	Hesse
Waldenburg Hills	Mühlberg	523	1,716	Baden-Württemberg
Welzheim Forest	Hagberg	585	1,919	Baden-Württemberg
Weper	Balos	379	1,243	Lower Saxony
Westerwald	Fuchskaute	657	2,156	Rhineland-Palatinate
Weser Uplands	Große Blöße	528	1,732	Lower Saxony
Weser Hills	Hohenstein	330	1,080	Lower Saxony
Wetterstein	Zugspitze	2,962	9,718	Bavaria
Wiehen Hills	Heidbrink	320	1,050	North Rhine-Westphalia
Wieren Hills	Hoher Berg	137	449	Lower Saxony
Windleite	Zimmerberg	374	1,227	Thuringia
Wingst	Silberberg	74	243	Lower Saxony
Zittau Mountains	Lausche	793	2,602	Saxony
Zitter Forest	Weißer Stein	689	2,260	Saxony

== See also ==
- Mountain
  - List of the highest mountains in Germany
  - List of the highest mountains in Austria
  - List of mountains in Switzerland
  - Eight-thousander
  - List of the highest mountains in the continents
