= Central Uplands =

Geographic region of Germany

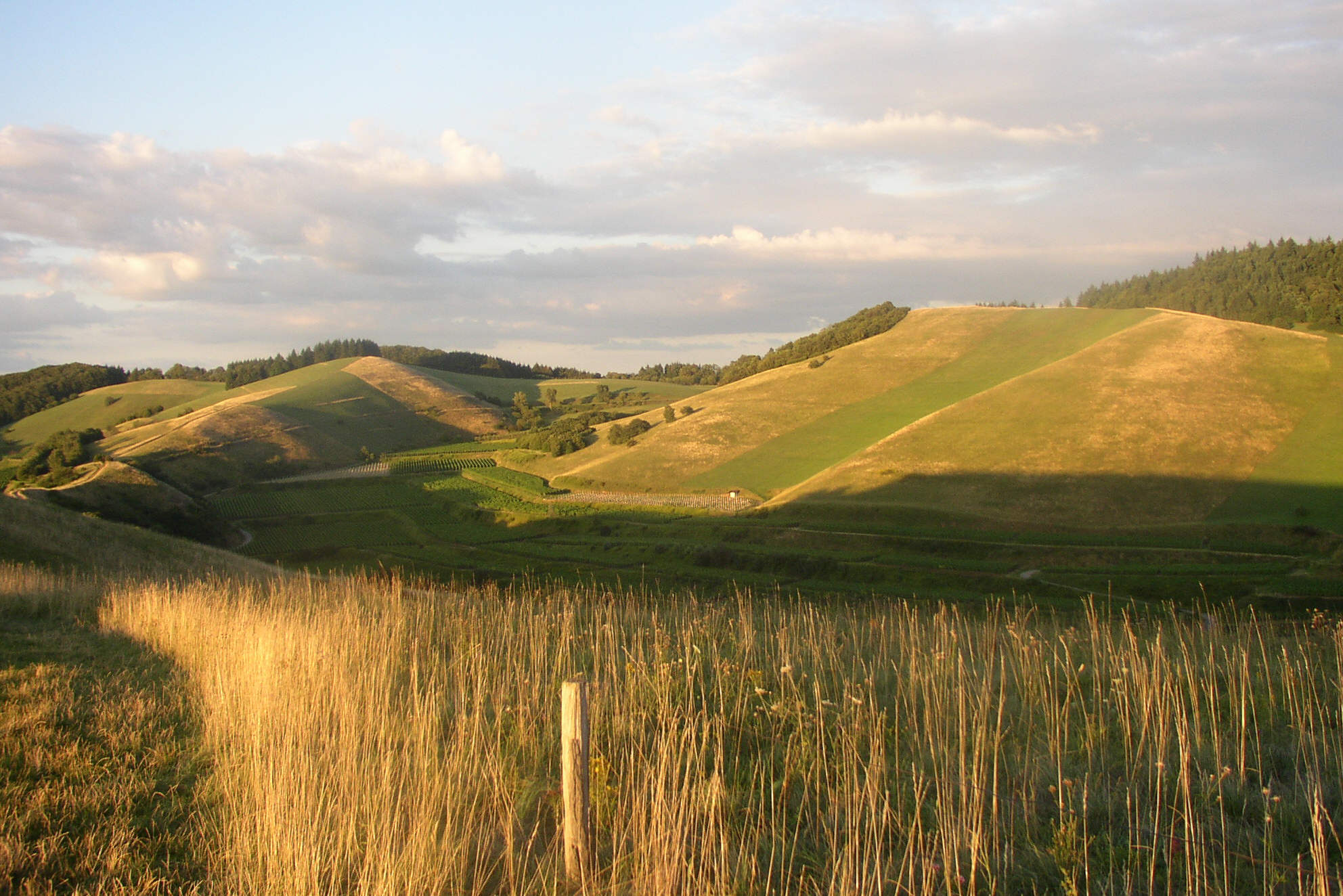
Central Uplands in Baden-Württemberg: the Kaiserstuhl

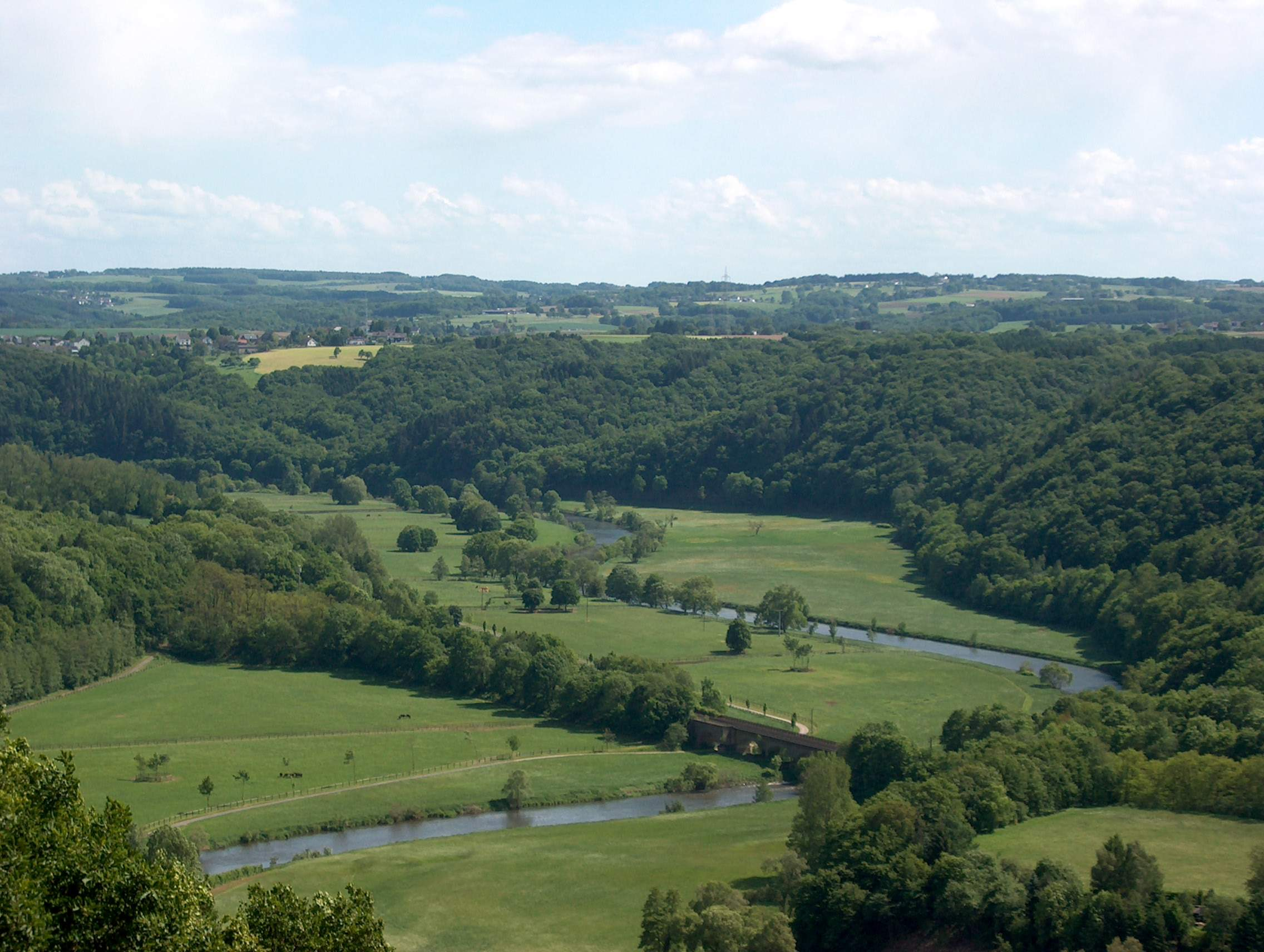
Central Uplands in North Rhine-Westphalia: Siegtal in the Rhenish Massif

The Central Uplands (German: die Mittelgebirge) is one of the three major natural regions of Germany. It stretches east to west across the country. To the north lies the North German Plain or Northern Lowland; to the south, the Alps and the Alpine Foreland.

== Formation ==
The German Central Uplands, like the Scandinavian and British mountain ranges and the Urals, belong to the oldest mountains of Europe, even if their present-day appearance has only developed relatively recently. In the Carboniferous, i.e. about 350 million years ago, Variscan mountain ranges were formed in central Europe by the uplifting caused by tectonic plate collision. Immediately after their formation the erosion of the mountains began under the influence of exogenous processes during the Permian period. During the Triassic period, which began about 225 million years ago, what is now central Europe was sometimes above and sometimes below sea level. As a result, there are various layers of sedimentary rock in the Central Uplands: in most cases new red sandstone has been laid down as the terrestrial layer of rock and keuper and muschelkalk as marine sedimentary layers. The Jurassic period primarily saw the formation of limestone, whilst chalk was the main deposition from the Cretaceous period.

With the beginning of the Cenozoic era, some 70 million years ago, the process of erosion of the Hercynian mountain ranges changed. During the Tertiary, alpidic mountain building took place, in the course of which strong forces deformed the stumps of the Hercynian mountains. As these rocks were already folded, further tension led to cracks and fractures, which in turn created fault blocks. These blocks were later uplifted (forming horsts such as the Harz), or downfaulted (trough faults or graben such as the Upper Rhine Valley) or thrust over one another (tilted fault blocks such as the Ore Mountains). Thus the German Central Uplands exhibit the widest variety of forms, something that is also attributable to the erosion of sediments from the Mesozoic (Triassic, Jurassic and Cretaceous). In some ranges the sediments have been relatively well-preserved, in others they have been carried away completely. The determining factor is the local intensity of exogenous processes.

== Most important ranges ==
The table lists the ranges peaking over 300 m above sea level widely seen as part of the Central Uplands. The coordinates are of the respective peaks. Many of the uplands overlap. The ranges are listed by height.

Mountain or hill range	Highest elevation	Height (m)	Coordinates	Precision
Wiehen Hills	Heidbrink	320	52°17′29″N 08°38′13″E	± 30″
Elm	Eilumer Horn	323	52°12′00″N 10°45′00″E	± 30″
Calenberg Highland	Hohe Egge (Süntel)	437	52°10′30″N 09°23′00″E	± 30″
Teutoburg Forest	Barnacken	446	51°51′30″N 08°54′30″E	± 30″
Siebengebirge	Großer Ölberg	460	50°40′56″N 07°14′54″E	± 1″
Egge Hills	Preußischer Velmerstot	468	51°50′00″N 08°57′30″E	± 30″
Kyffhäuser	Kulpenberg	474	51°24′42″N 11°04′39″E	± 1″
Solling	Große Blöße	528	51°47′00″N 09°26′00″E	± 30″
Kaiserstuhl	Totenkopf	557	48°04′51″N 07°40′14″E	± 1″
Spessart	Geiersberg	586	49°54′00″N 09°26′00″E	± 30″
Gladenbach Uplands	Angelburg	609	50°47′17″N 08°25′43″E	± 30″
Habichtswald	Hohes Gras	615	51°18′30″N 09°21′30″E	± 30″
Odenwald	Katzenbuckel	626	49°28′30″N 09°02′30″E	± 30″
Knüll	Eisenberg	636	50°53′14″N 09°31′02″E	± 1″
Kaufungen Forest	Hirschberg	643	51°14′30″N 09°46′00″E	± 30″
Westerwald	Fuchskaute	656	50°39′30″N 08°06′00″E	± 30″
Ebbe Mountains	Nordhelle	663	51°08′54″N 07°45′23″E	± 1″
Palatine Forest	Kalmit	673	49°19′08″N 08°04′58″E	± 1″
Kellerwald	Wüstegarten	675	51°00′59″N 09°05′03″E	± 10″
North Palatine Highland	Donnersberg	687	49°37′29″N 07°55′38″E	± 10″
Franconian Jura	Hesselberg	689	49°04′00″N 10°32′00″E	± 30″
Elbe Sandstone Mountains	Děčínský Sněžník	723	50°47′30″N 14°07′00″E	± 30″
Eifel	Hohe Acht	746	50°23′30″N 07°00′30″E	± 30″
Hoher Meißner	Kasseler Kuppe	754	51°14′30″N 09°51′30″E	± 30″
Vogelsberg	Taufstein	773	50°31′00″N 09°14′30″E	± 30″
Zittau Mountains	Lausche	793	50°51′00″N 14°39′00″E	± 30″
Franconian Forest	Döbraberg	794	50°17′00″N 11°39′00″E	± 30″
Hunsrück	Erbeskopf	816	49°44′00″N 07°05′30″E	± 30″
Elster Mountains	Počátecký vrch	819	50°19′30″N 12°26′30″E	± 30″
Rothaar Mountains	Langenberg	843	51°16′30″N 08°33′30″E	± 30″
Thuringian Highland	Großer Farmdenkopf	869	50°30′30″N 11°02′00″E	± 30″
Taunus	Großer Feldberg	882	50°13′55″N 08°27′26″E	± 1″
Rhön	Wasserkuppe	950	50°29′53″N 09°56′16″E	± 1″
Thuringian Forest	Großer Beerberg	983	50°39′29″N 10°44′38″E	± 5″
Swabian Jura	Lemberg	1015	48°09′00″N 08°45′00″E	± 30″
Upper Palatine Forest	Čerchov	1042	49°23′00″N 12°47′00″E	± 30″
Fichtel Mountains	Schneeberg	1053	50°03′30″N 11°51′30″E	± 30″
Harz	Brocken	1141	51°48′00″N 10°37′00″E	± 30″
Ore Mountains	Klínovec	1244	50°24′00″N 12°58′00″E	± 30″
Bavarian Forest	Großer Arber	1456	49°07′00″N 13°08′00″E	± 30″
Black Forest	Feldberg	1493	47°52′25″N 08°00′14″E	± 1″

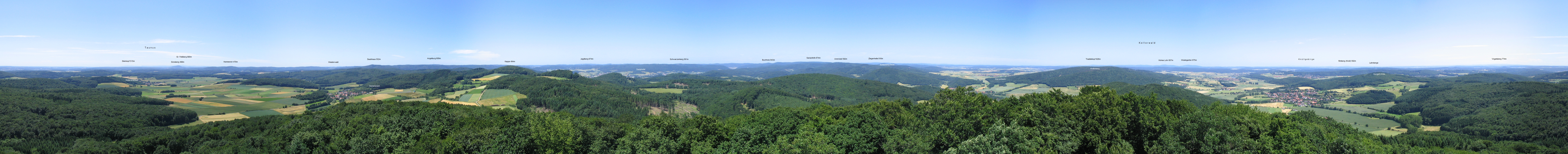
Panorama from Rimberg, interface between Rothaar Mountains (Rhenish Massif) and West Hesse Highlands

== See also ==
- Geography of Germany
- Mittelgebirge, generic German term for low mountain or high hill ranges
- Natural regions of Germany

== Sources ==
- Dickinson, Robert E (1964). Germany: A regional and economic geography (2nd ed.). London: Methuen. ASIN B000IOFSEQ.
