= Mackenröder Spitze =

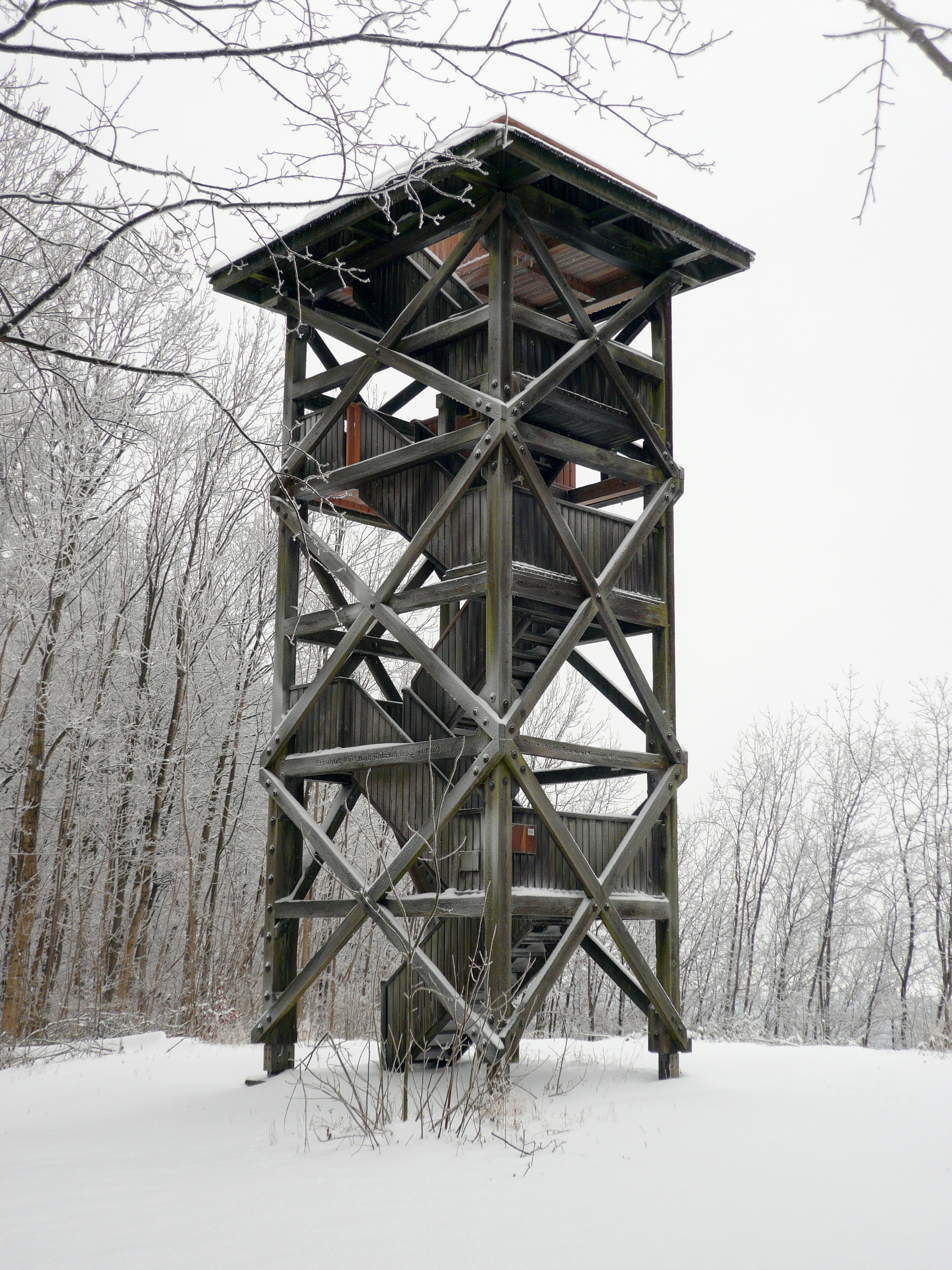

Highest point
- Elevation: 427.5 m above sea level (NN) (1,403 ft)
- Isolation: 7,1 km→ Die Gleichen
- Coordinates: 51°32′13″N 10°03′05″E

Geography
- Location within Lower Saxony
- Location: Lower Saxony, Germany
- Parent range: Göttingen Forest, Leine Uplands

The Mackenröder Spitze, at about 427.5 m above sea level (NN), is the highest hill in the Göttingen Forest and lies on the boundary of the town and district of Göttingen, in South Lower Saxony in Germany.

== Geography ==
The heavily forested hill is located on the eastern escarpment of the Göttingen Forest, a southern part of the Leine Uplands, about 8 km east of the Göttingen town centre and just under 1 kilometre northwest of Mackenrode, a village in the southwest of the municipality of Landolfshausen. From Göttingen (e.g. the borough of Herberhausen), the Mackenröder Spitze can be ascended by a hike through forest on gently sloping terrain. Coming from Mackenrode or Waake, the hill may be reached via short and steep ascents.

== Harzblick observation tower ==
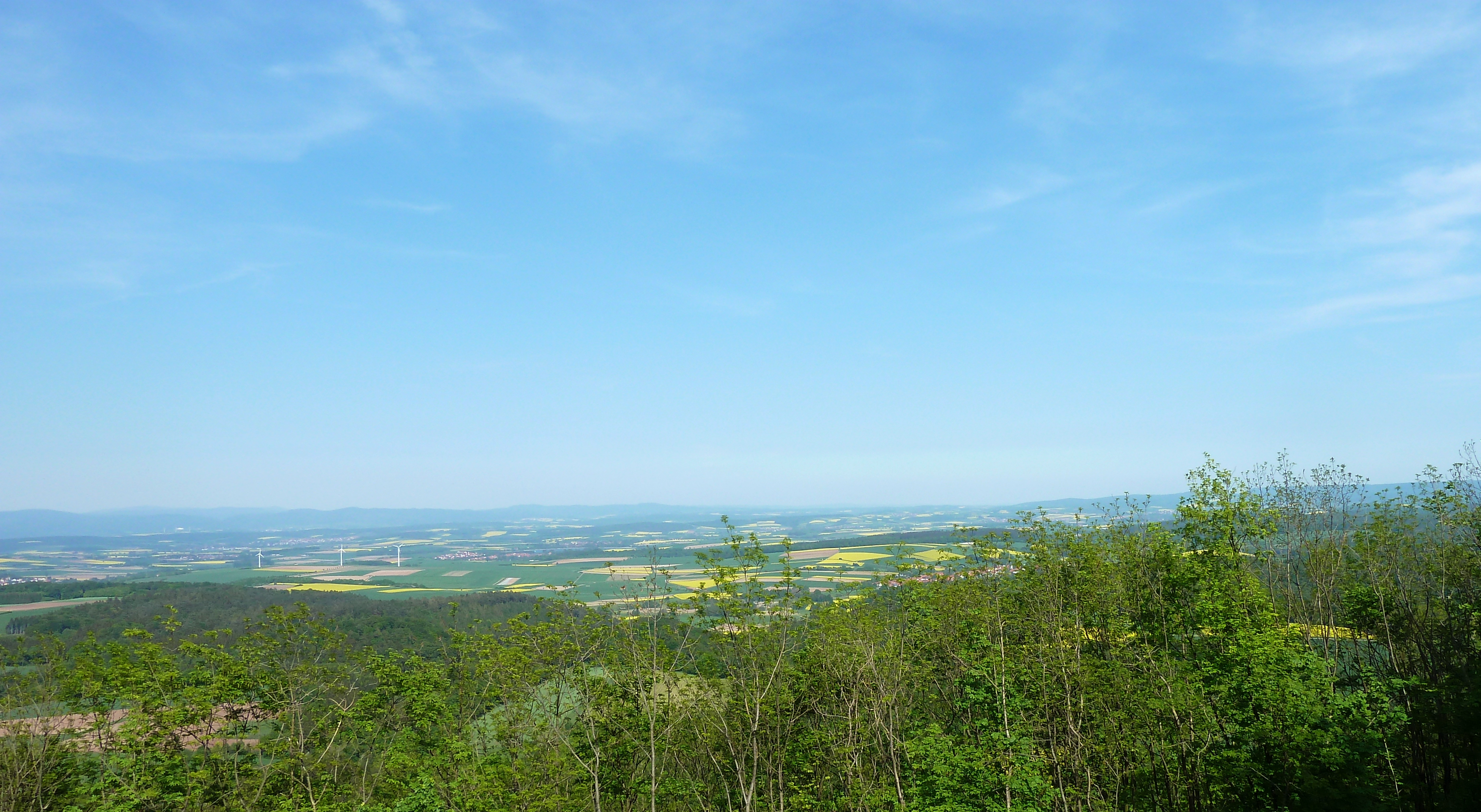
View from the tower over the Eichsfeld Basin to the Harz

Just under 400 metres north of the Mackenröder Spitze and about 1.6 kilometres northwest of Mackenrode stands the Harzblick observation tower at a height of 425 metres. The tower used to stand next to the forest inn at the summit of the Mackenröder Spitze, but due to the construction of a military base in the 1970s it was moved to its present location.

From its viewing platform there are good long-distance views. To the northeast the Harz Mountains and their highest peak, the Brocken, may be seen; to the east is Untereichsfeld and the Seeburger See, southeast are the Ohm Hills, looking south the Hoher Meißner can be seen beyond Die Gleichen, to the southwest lies the Kaufungen Forest, west-southwest is the Gauß Tower on the Hoher Hagen in the Dransfeld Municipal Forest, and to the northwest is the Solling.
