= Olymp =

Olymp may refer to:

- Deutscher Olymp, hill in Cuxhaven, Germany
- RC Olymp, Ukrainian rugby union club
- IL Molde-Olymp, Norwegian sports club
- Olymp-K, a Russian (suspected) spy satellite

== See also ==
- Olimp (disambiguation)
