= Silberberg (Wingst) =

Hill in Landkreis Cuxhaven, Germany

Coordinates: 53°43′53″N 09°04′02″E

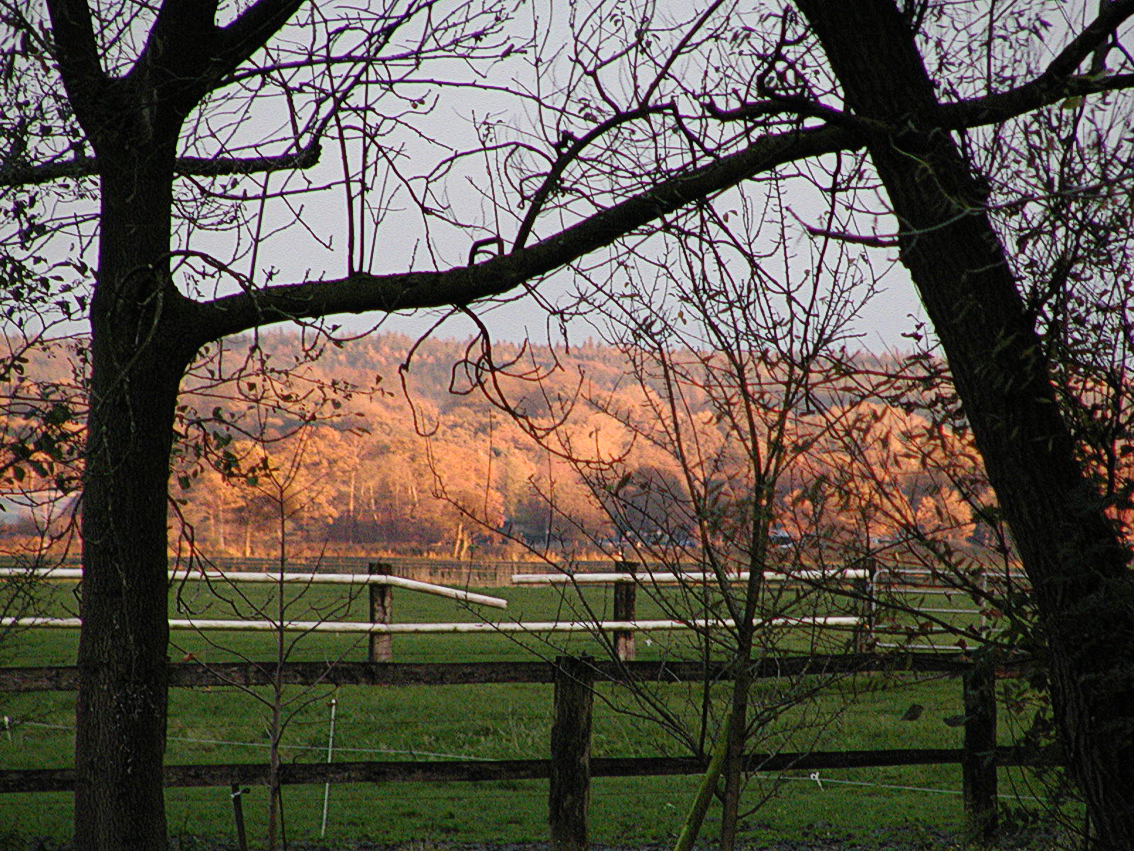
Westside Silberberg

The Silberberg (German pronunciation: [ˈzɪlbɐˌbɛʁk]) is a low hill, 74 metres high, in the Wingst ridge in the district of Cuxhaven in the north German state of Lower Saxony.

It is the highest natural elevation in the Elbe-Weser Triangle, but is overshadowed by the observation tower of the nearby hill of Deutscher Olymp. It was formed from an ice age moraine. There used to be a small silver mine here which gave the hill its name.
