= Olimp =

Olimp may refer to:

- Olimp (organization), a Polish anti-Nazi organization in Wrocław during World War II
- Olimp (brand), brand of reel-to-reel tape recorder
- Olimp, Romania, a summer resort in Romania on the Black Sea
- Olimp, Belgrade, neighbourhood of Zvezdara, Belgrade, Serbia
- Olimp-2, football stadium in Rostov-on-Don, Russia
- JFK Olimps/RFS, known as Olimps, Latvian football club
- FC Olimp Comrat, Moldovan football club

== See also ==
- Olymp (disambiguation)
