= Kulpenberg TV tower =

Coordinates: 51.4119°N 11.0761°E

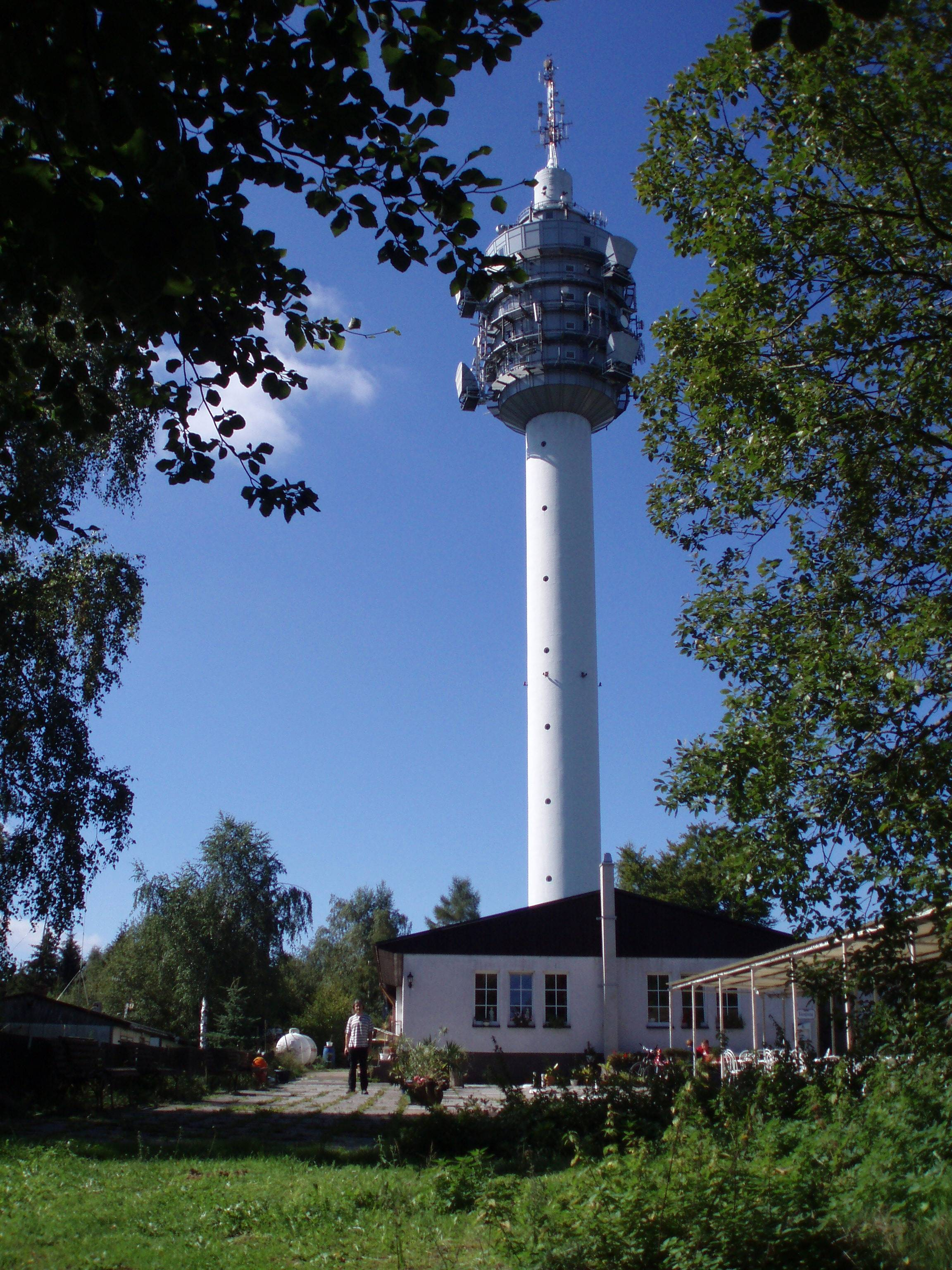
Kulpenberg TV tower, 2006

The Kulpenburg TV tower (German: Sender Kulpenberg) is a 94-metre-high (308 ft) telecommunication tower on Kulpenberg mountain in Thuringia, Germany. It was built of reinforced concrete between 1959 and 1964 and has an observation deck and a restaurant at a height of 76 metres (249 ft). The observation deck and the restaurant are closed to visitors.

== See also ==
- List of towers
