= Gatter Mountains =

Hill range in Germany

- Gattergebirge
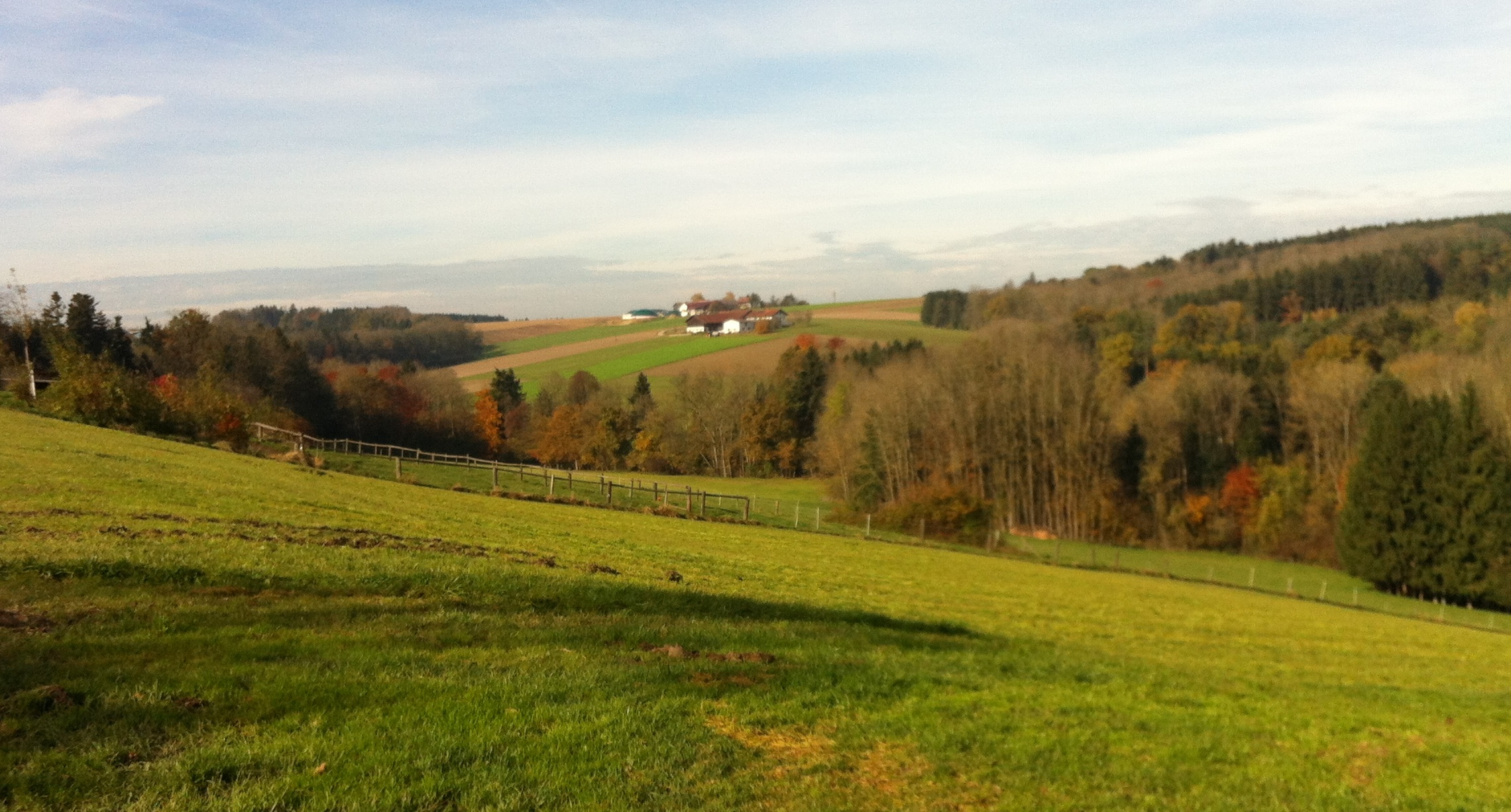
- View from Sankt Wolfgang hamlet of Burdberg looking northwest

Highest point
- Peak: Unnamed kuppe near the Sankt Wolfgang hamlet of Schedenberg
- Elevation: 618 m above NHN
- Coordinates: 48°14′01″N 12°12′23″E

Geography
- Location within Bavaria
- State(s): Counties of Erding and Mühldorf am Inn; Bavaria (Germany)
- Parent range: Isar-Inn Gravel Beds

The Gatter Mountains (German: Gattergebirge) are a large, hill range up to about 618 m above sea level (NHN) and just under 50 km^{2} in area in the province of Upper Bavaria in Germany. They lie near the town of Sankt Wolfgang in the counties of Erding and Mühldorf am Inn.

The German names, Gattergebirge and Gatterberg(e) are often seen colloquially as interchangeable. With height differences of no more than around 160 metres, the landscape does not really appear mountainous, but more like a prominent range of hills made from terminal moraines. They are known in Sankt Wolfgang as "the Tuscany of Upper Bavaria".

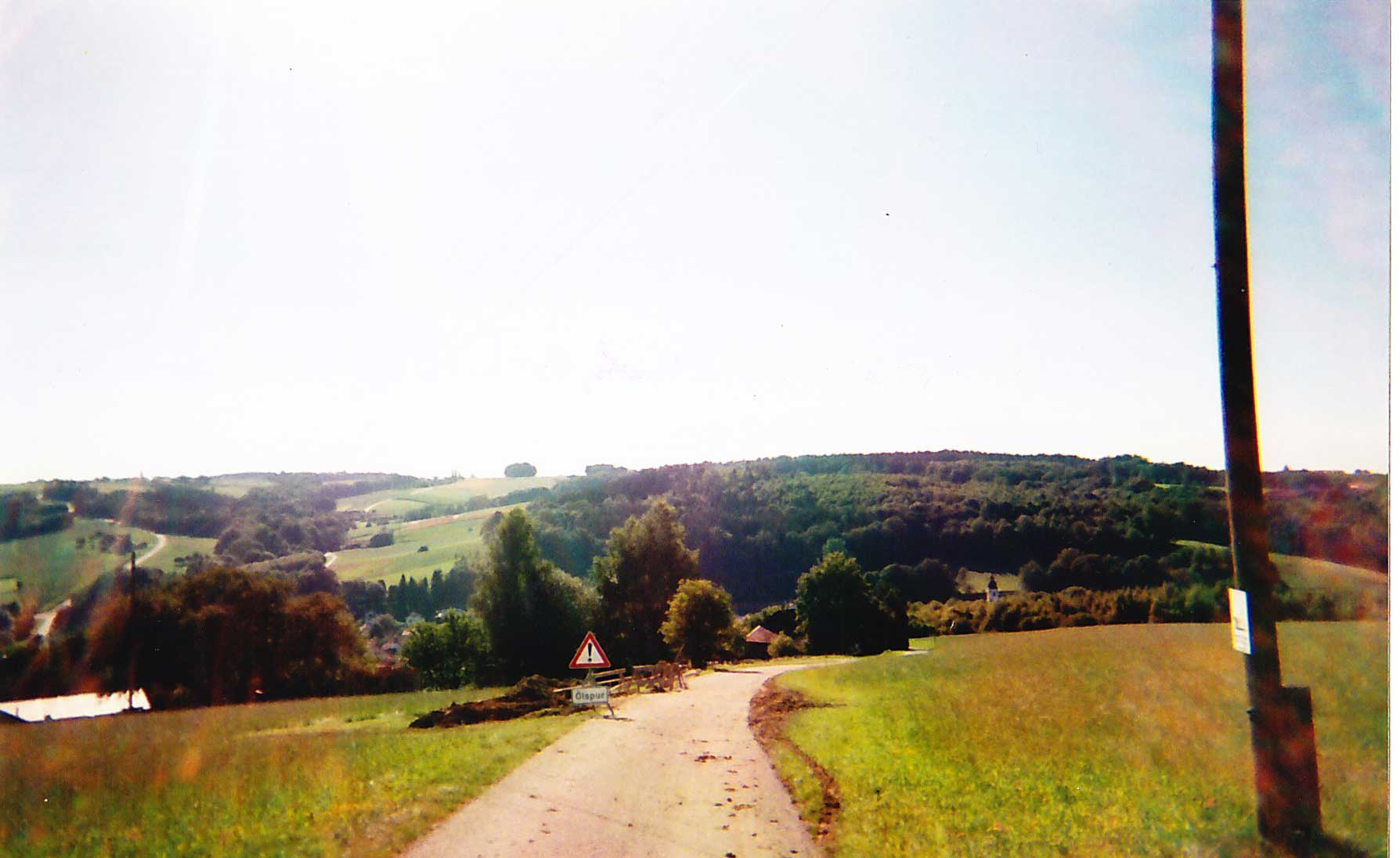
Southeastern foothills of the Gatter Mountains near Oberornau
