= Dransfeld Municipal Forest =

Hill range in Germany

Coordinates: 51.4752°N 9.7646°E

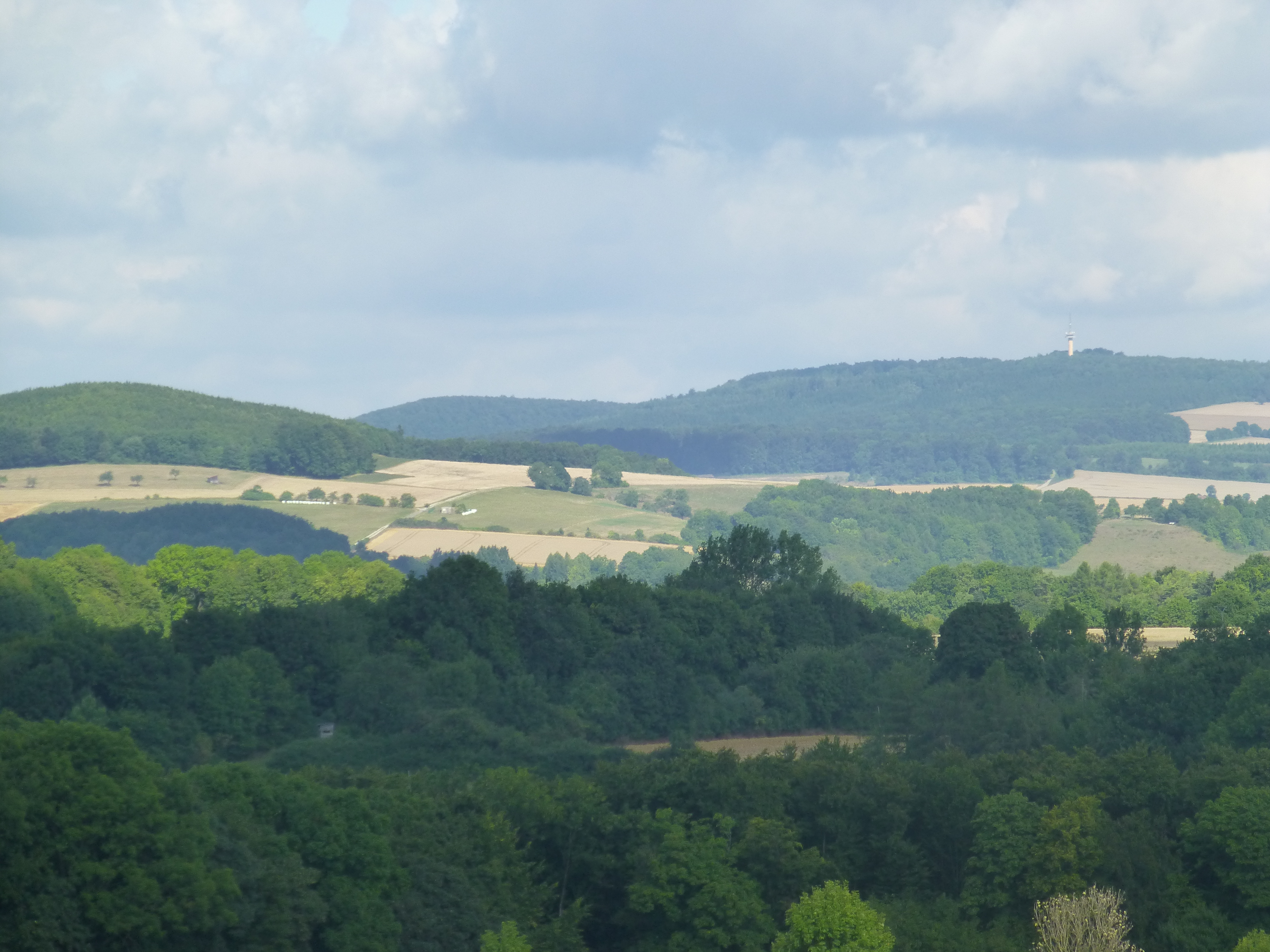

The Dransfeld Municipal Forest (German: Dransfelder Stadtwald) is situated on a ridge in Germany's Central Uplands that ascends to 480 m high. It is located in the district of Göttingen, in South Lower Saxony. Although its name suggests a forest within a town, Dranfeld Municipal Forest is actually a small, heavily forested high ridge that lies about halfway between the city of Göttingen to the northeast and the town of Hann. Münden to the southwest; it is east of the Bramwald and immediately south of the city of Dransfeld. The B3 federal highway runs through the western foothills of the Dransfeld Municipal Forest, located in the northern part of the Münden Nature Park.

Named hills in the Dransfeld Municipal Forest include:

- Hoher Hagen (originally 508 m) - with its Gauß Tower
- Brunsberg (480 m)
- Hengelsberg (463 m) - with the source of the Auschnippe and the nearby "Giesekestein" monument
- Dransberg (422 m)
- Schotsberg (419 m)
- Lohberg (312 m)
