= Diedrichshagener Berg =

- Location within Mecklenburg-Vorpommern

Highest point
- Elevation: 129.8 m above sea level (NHN) (426 ft)
- Listing: highest point in the Kühlung ridge
- Coordinates: 54°06′23″N 11°46′11″E

Geography
- Location: Mecklenburg-Vorpommern, Germany

Geology
- Rock age: 15,600 to 13,700 years ago
- Mountain type(s): Drift of the Pomeranian Stadium of the Weichselian glaciation Ice age terminal moraine

The Diedrichshagener Berg, at 129.8 metres, is the highest point on the forested ridge of Kühlung in the northeast German state of Mecklenburg-Vorpommern.

It is located in the district of Rostock only roughly southeast of the Bay of Mecklenburg, south of the Baltic Sea coast, and immediately south of Kühlungsborn and roughly west of Bad Doberan.

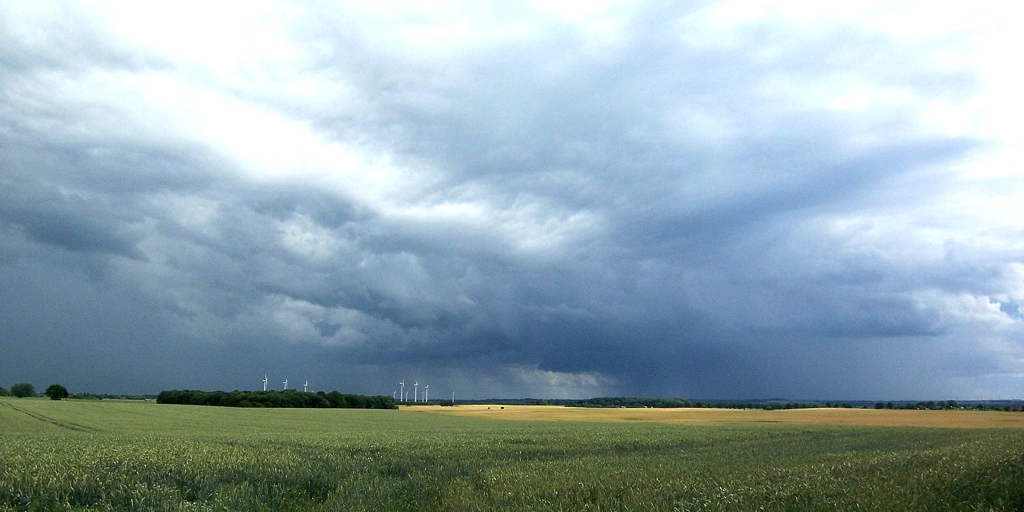
View looking towards Kröpelin

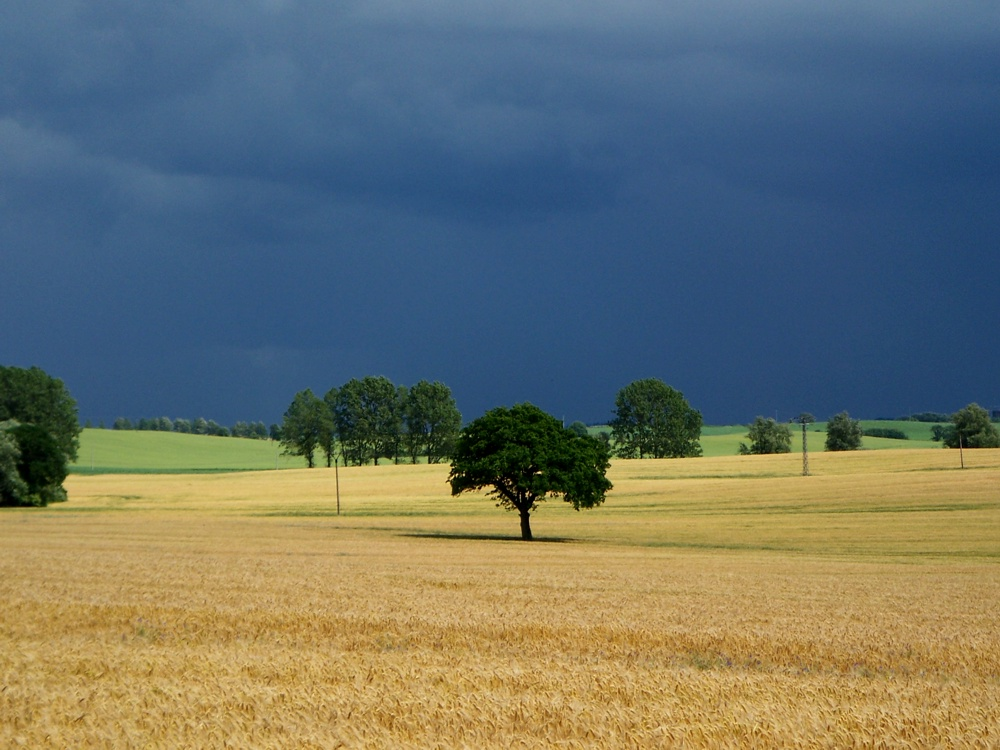
On the Diedrichshagener Berg
