= Kühlung =

Ridge in Mecklenburg-Vorpommern, Germany

Coordinates: 54°6′36″N 11°46′38″E

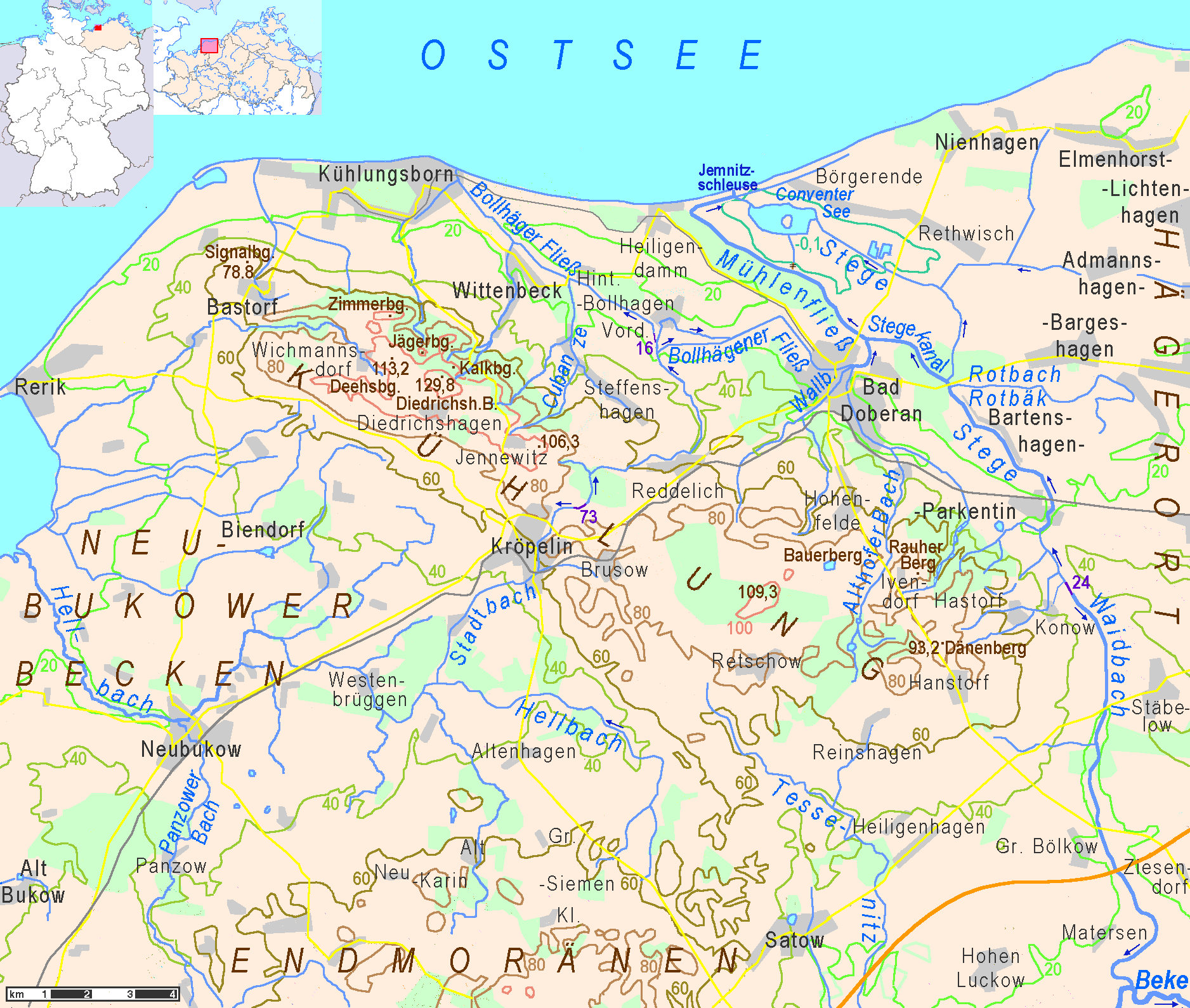
Map of the Kühlung with rivers, forests, and contour lines

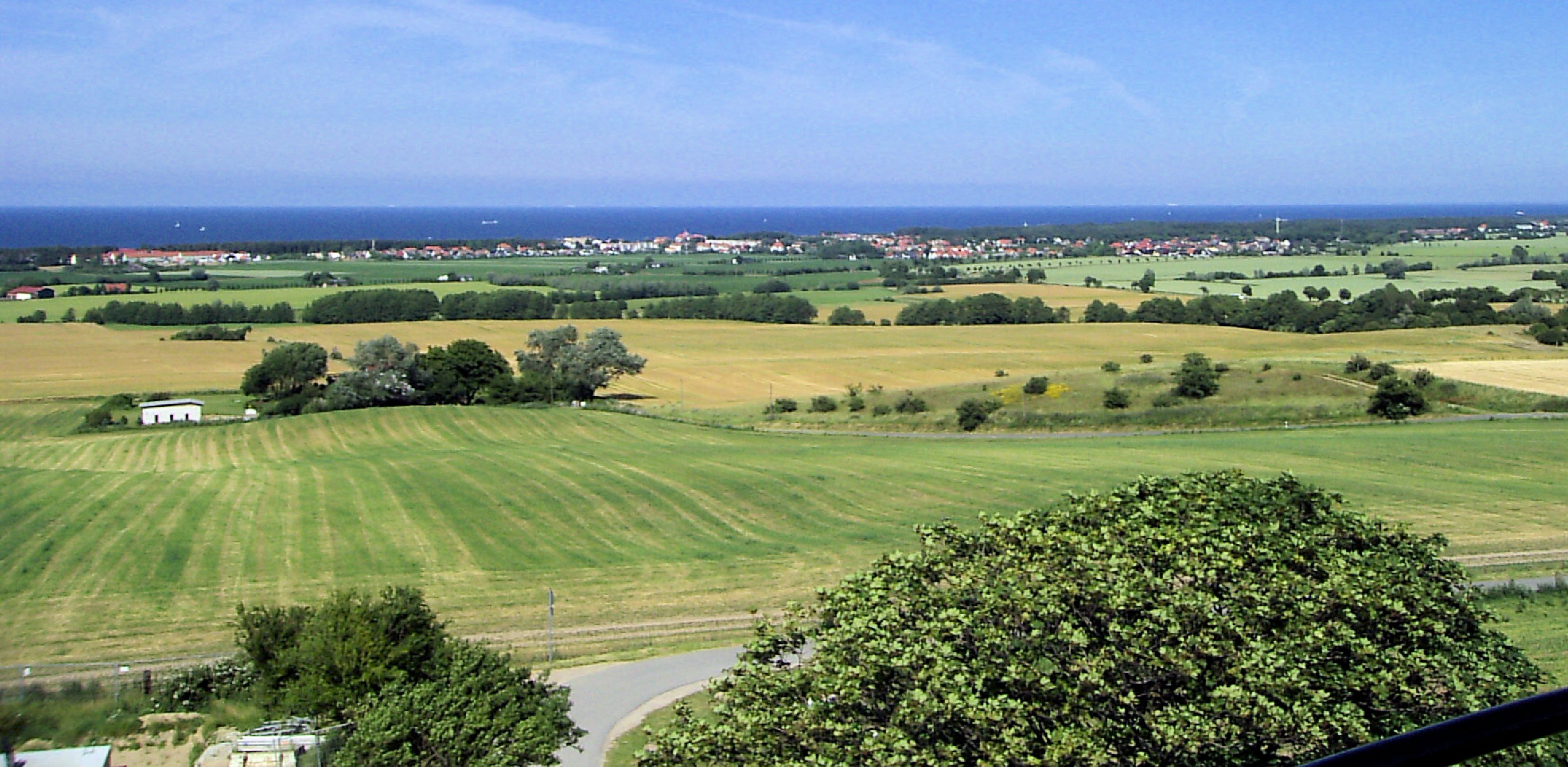
View from Bastorf Lighthouse towards Kühlungsborn

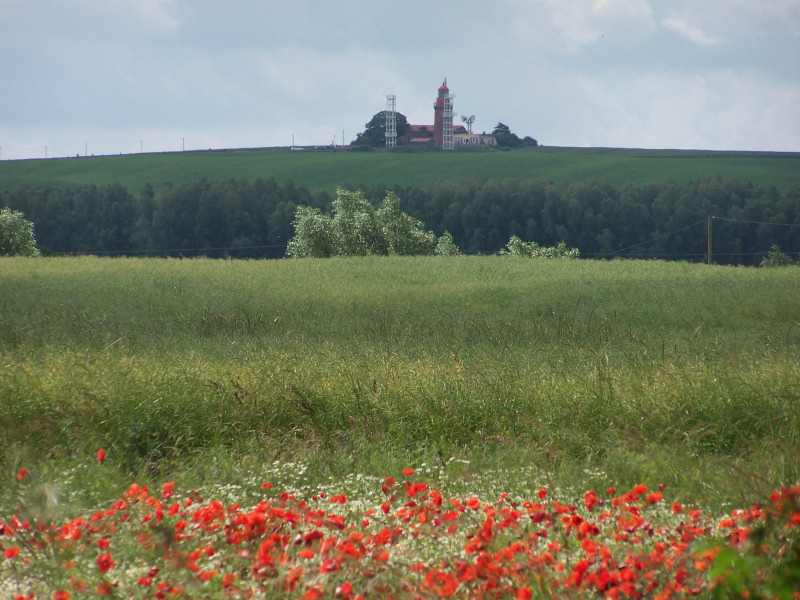
View of the Bastorf Lighthouse from the coast

The Kühlung is a forested ridge, up to 129.8 m above sea level (NHN), in the north German state of Mecklenburg-Vorpommern. The name is derived from the word Kuhlen (referring to the extensive fissuring of the northern slope).

== Geography ==
The Kühlung is situated in the district of Rostock, southeast of the Bay of Mecklenburg, south of the Baltic Sea coast, and south and west of Bad Doberan and its seaside resort Kühlungsborn. The major part of this hilly landscape forms a protected area. The Kühlung is part of the Baltic Uplands that extend along the southern coast of Baltic Sea from Ostholstein to the Baltic republics.

The ridge extends from northwest to southeast for about 23 kilometres and is between three and eight kilometres wide. The northwestern part is a ridge, eleven kilometres long, called the Driedrichshagener Berge ("Driedrichshagen Hills"), or – colloquially – simply "Kühlung". The Driedrichshagener Berge begin near the sea with the hill known as the Bastorfer Signalberg (height 78.8 metres), on which stands the landmark of the Bastorf Lighthouse. The northern slope of this ridge with its short valleys and deep, natural pits (Ger.: "Kuhlen") gave its name to the whole landscape. This slope is covered by a contiguous strip of forest, between 500 metres and one kilometre wide, with a total area of 6,300 hectares. Another important forest on the Kühlung is the Hütter Wohld in the east. In its longest valley there is a series of ponds, the Hüttener Klosterteiche, that are under a higher level of protection than the rest of the Kühlung. The Hütter Wohld is situated on the eastern edge of the eastern Kühlung, called Ivendorfer Höhen ("Ivendorf Heights"). This little upland is almost as broad as it is long. On its heights there are forests on the soil of former mosses. A little over half the Kühlung is used for fields and pasture.

== Geology ==
The hills and the unusual soil composition of the Kühlung were created during the Last glacial period of Europe by the compression of moraines. The natural pits in the northern slope that were created by blocks of slowly melting ice, when the glacier was retreating.

== Hills ==
In the Kühlung, some of the sites referred to as a "Berg" (Eng.: hill or mountain) are merely promontories, while some of its summits are unnamed.

Some of the main hills with heights above sea level:

- Diedrichshagener Berg (129.8 m), highest summit in the range
- Deehsberg (113.2 m)
- Kalkberg (Kühlung)|Kalkberg (111.8 m)
- Großer Jägerberg (110.3 m)
- Zimmerberg (109.7 m)
- unnamed high point of the Ivendorfer Höhen (109.7 m)
- Jägerberg (100.3 m NHN)
- Anningsbarg (99.3 m NHN)
- Dänenberg (93.,2 m, Ivendorfer Höhen)
- Bauerberg (92.8 m, Ivendorfer Höhen)
- Rauher Berg (90.2 m, Ivendorfer Höhen)
- Schlossberg (86 m)
- Budenberg (82.8 m NHN)
- Franzosenberg (82 m)
- Bastorfer Signalberg (78.8 m NHN) with Bastorf Lighthouse

== Places ==
- Kühlungsborn some way to the north
- Bad Doberan to the east
- Kröpelin to the south, near the centre
- Rerik some way to the west
