= Valtenberg =

Coordinates: 51°04′30″N 14°16′42″E

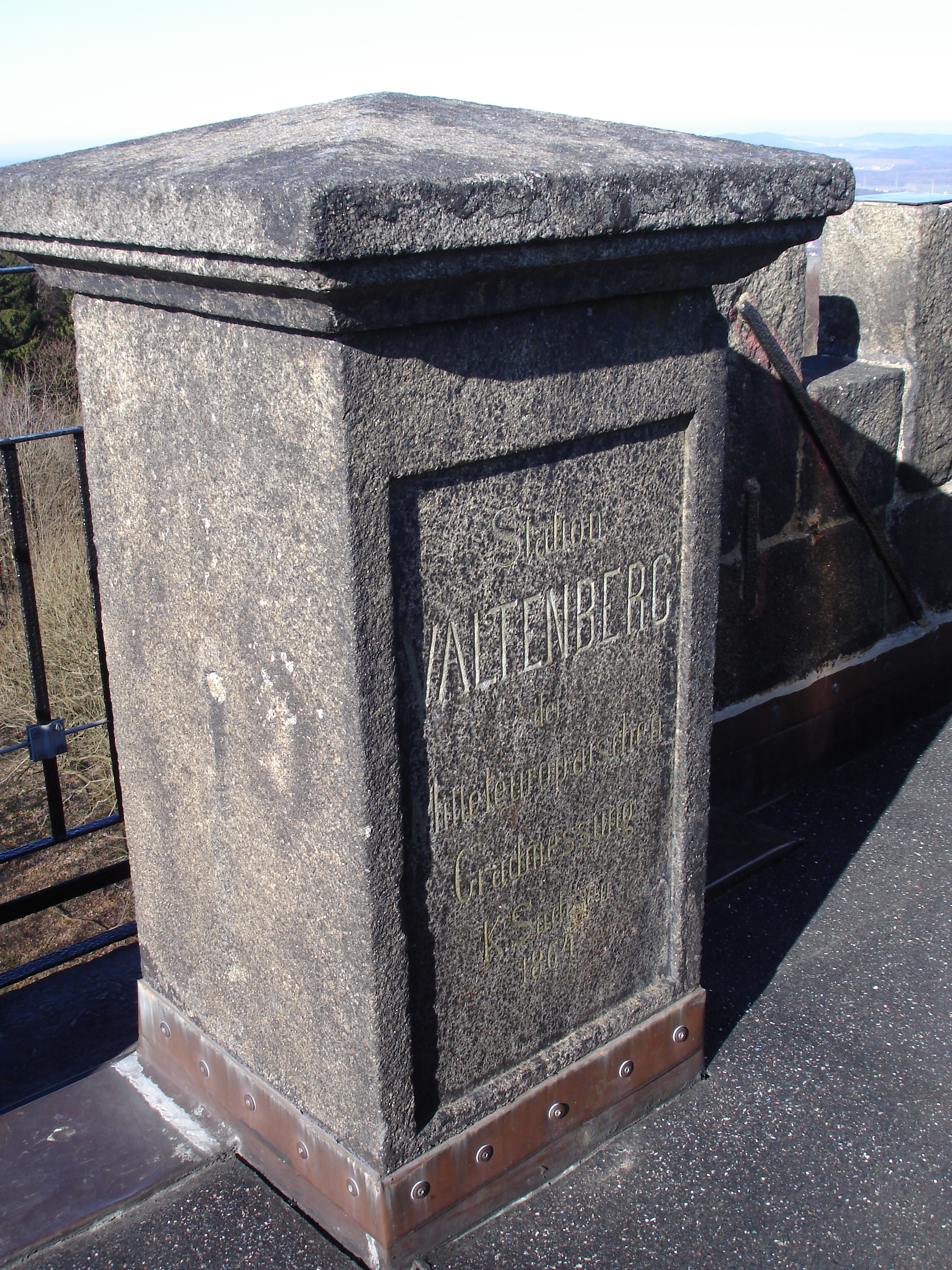
- Surveying Column on the Valtenberg Tower, Saxony

Highest point
- Elevation: 586.6 m (1,925 ft)

Geography
- Location: Saxony, Germany

Valtenberg is a mountain of Saxony, southeastern Germany.
