= Eilumer Horn =

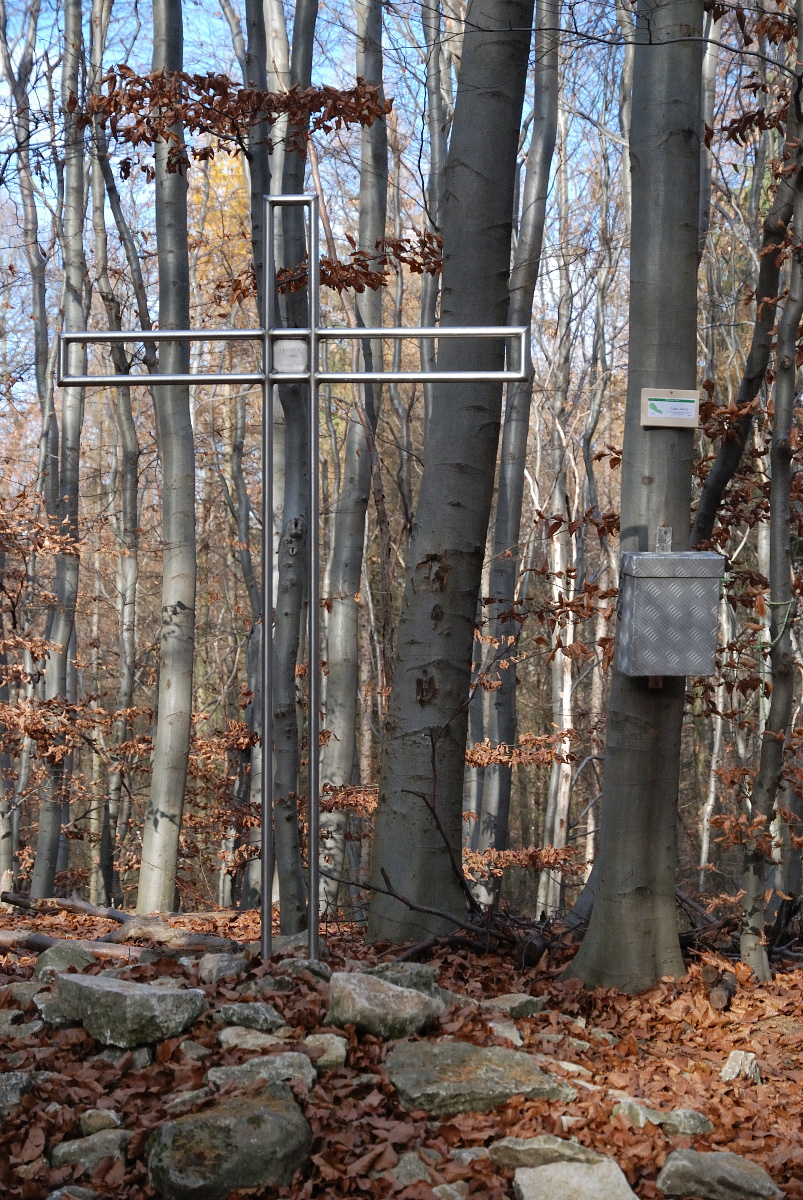

Highest point
- Elevation: 323.3 m (1,061 ft)
- Prominence: 237 m ↓ Bifurcation between the Großer Graben and Schiffgraben south of Winnigstedt → Harz near Goslar
- Isolation: 35 km → Harz Mountains east of Bad Harzburg
- Coordinates: 52°11′45″N 10°44′41″E

Geography
- Location within Lower Saxony
- Location: Lower Saxony, Germany
- Parent range: Elm

The Eilumer Horn, at 323.3 m above sea level (NN), is the highest point in the Elm, a ridge in the north German state of Lower Saxony. Although many maps suggest the Drachenberg is the highest hill in the Elm, the latter only reaches a height of 314 metres according to the State Survey Office of Lower Saxony (Landesvermessungsamt Niedersachsen).

== History ==
For a long time the Eilumer Horn unexplored by the population and was just referred to as Kuxwall.

== Summit ==
At the summit of the Eilumer Horn stands a metal summit cross with a summit register.

== Geography ==
The shape of the Eilumer Horn is very different from that of the other hills in the Elm. It is steeper and rockier. At the foot of the hills lies the valley of Reitlingstal, a popular local destination.

== Origin of the name ==
Its name comes from the direction in which the "horn" faces, namely towards the village of Eilum on the edge of the Elm.

== Sources ==
- http://elm-asse-kultur.de
