= Sankt Wolfgang =

- Municipality
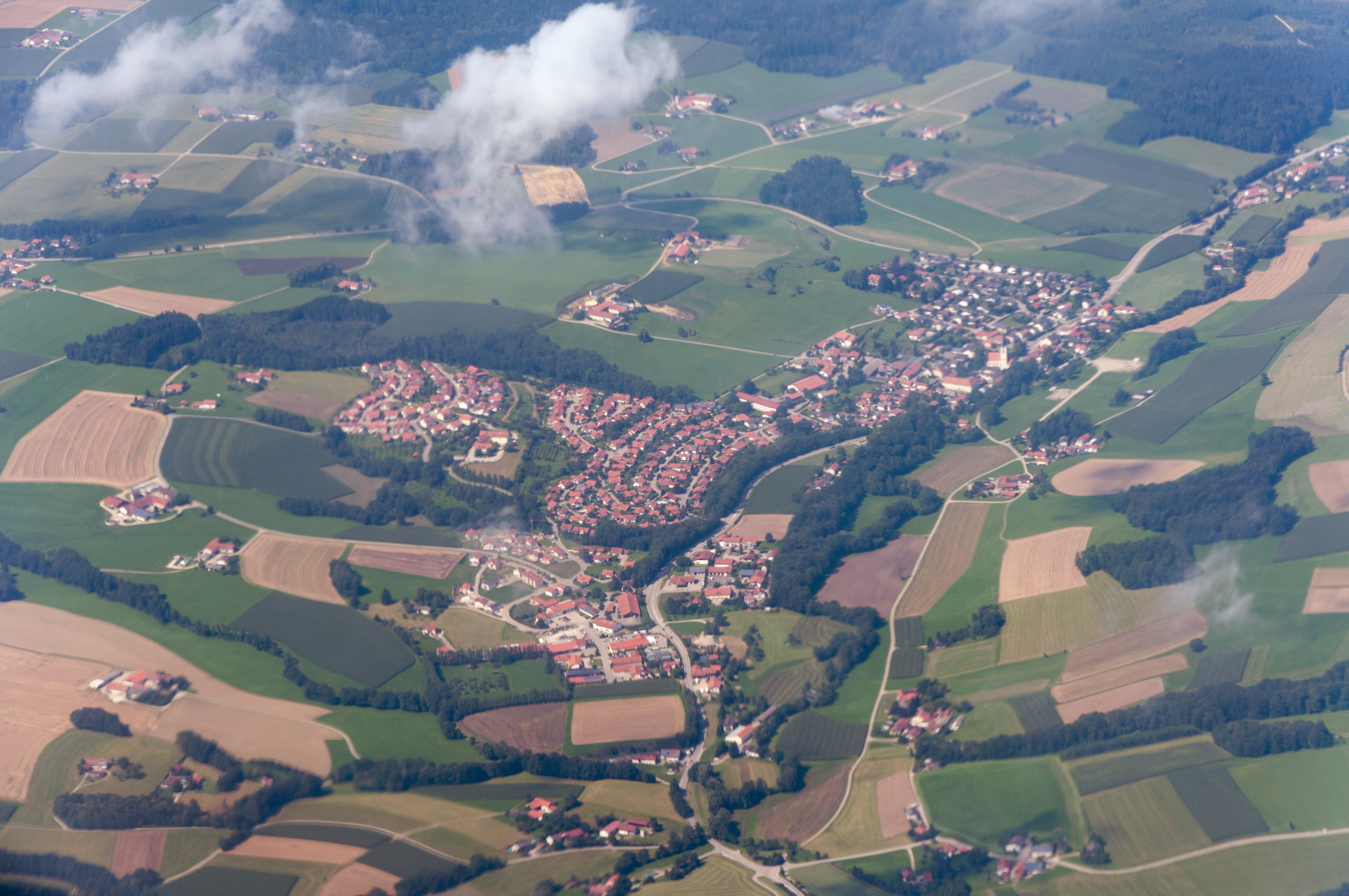
- Aerial view

- Coat of arms

- Location of Sankt Wolfgang within Erding district
- Interactive map of Sankt Wolfgang
- Location within Germany Location within Bavaria
- Coordinates: 48°13′N 12°8′E
- Country: Germany
- State: Bavaria
- Admin. region: Oberbayern
- District: Erding
- Subdivisions: 7 Ortsteile

Government
  - Mayor (2020–26): Ullrich Gaigl (FW)

Area
  - Total: 46.31 km^{2} (17.88 sq mi)
- Elevation: 499–582 m (1,637–1,909 ft)

Population (2025-12-31)
  - Total: 4,581
  - Density: 98.92/km^{2} (256.2/sq mi)
- Time zone: UTC+01:00 (CET)
  - Summer (DST): UTC+02:00 (CEST)
- Postal codes: 84427
- Dialling codes: 08085
- Vehicle registration: ED
- Website: www.st-wolfgang-ob.de

Sankt Wolfgang (German pronunciation: [zaŋkt ˈvɔlfɡaŋ]) is a municipality in the district of Erding in Bavaria in Germany.
