= Wingst (ridge) =

Mountain ridge in Germany

Coordinates: 53.7294°N 9.0567°E

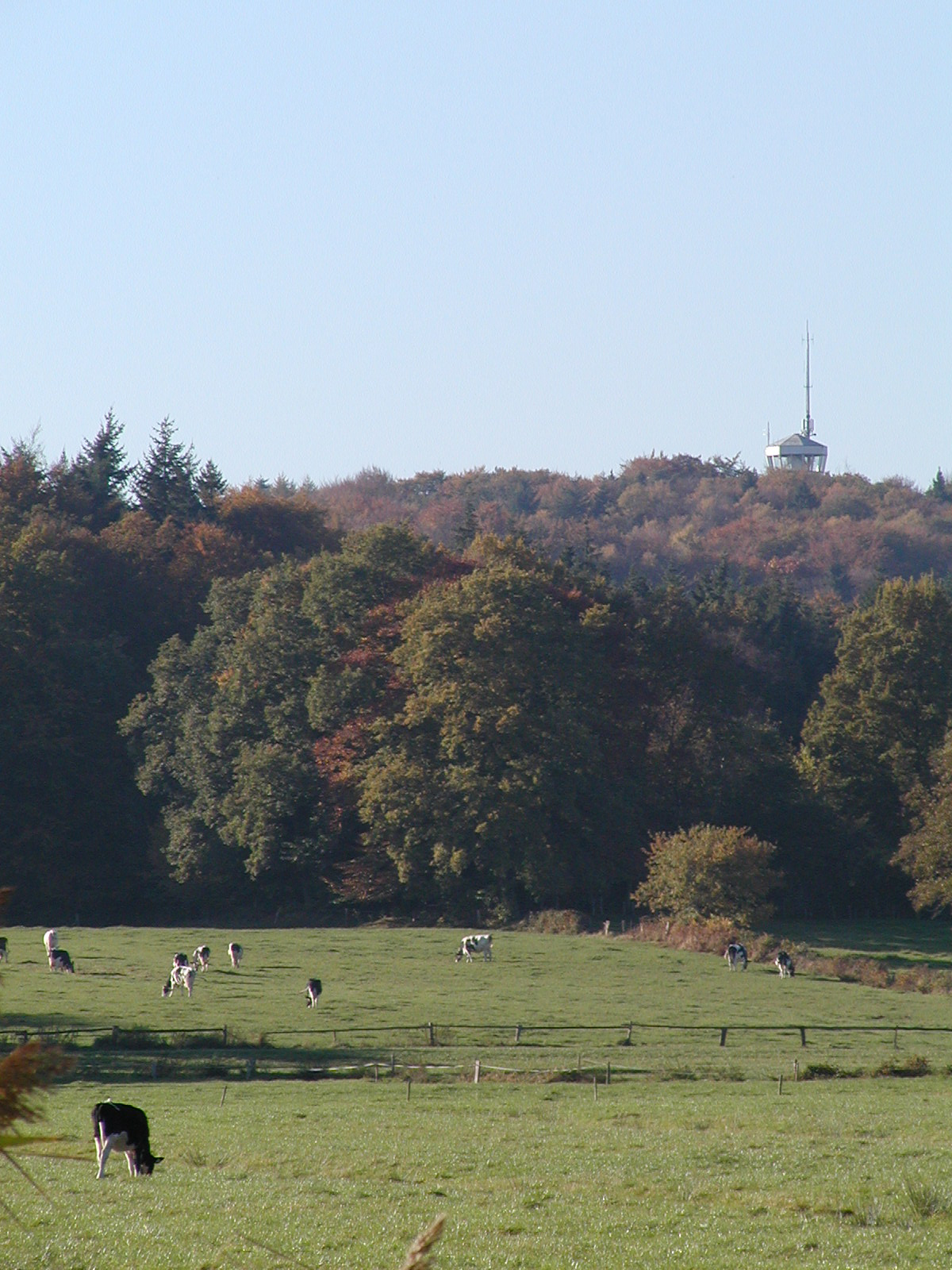
The Deutscher Olymp with its viewing tower

The Wingst is a ridge, up to 74 metres high, in northern Lower Saxony, Germany.

== Geography ==
The ridge is located in northeast part of the district of Cuxhaven, just a few kilometres south of the mouth of the River Elbe on the North Sea coast, and west of the lower reaches of the Oste between Cadenberge to the north and Hemmoor to the south. It is surrounded by villages in the borough of Wingst. Some distance to the south-southwest of the Wingst is the lake of Balksee; south of which is the Varrel Moor.

== Geology and history ==
The Wingst is a small geest ridge, covered by mixed woods, that was formed by an ice age moraine. It is surrounded by flat, divided marsh and bog landscapes, that are sometimes only 1 metre above sea level. Dolmens situated within the Wingst indicate that there were early settlements in the local area.

== Infrastructure ==
The Wingst may be reached via the B 73 federal highway, that grazes the area to the east, as well as its side roads, and also via the Green Coast Road (Grüne Küstenstraße), which passes the ridge to the northwest. The Wingst is crossed by the E9 European long-distance path and also by regional walking trails. The Neuhaus-Bülkau Canal runs in a north-south direction just beyond the western fringes of the Wingst. On the northeastern edge of the Wingst is the Zoo in the Wingst.

== Elevations ==
The highest elevation in the Wingst is the Silberberg (74 m). Amongst its sub-peaks is the Deutscher Olymp (61 m), which has an observation tower of the same name. The other elevations in the Wingst are (in alphabetical order):

- Deutscher Olymp (61 m AMSL)
- Falkenberg
- Fuchsberg
- Gretenberg
- Kleverberg
- Kraienberg
- Silberberg (74 m)
