= Hoher Brand =

Mountain in Germany

Coordinates: 50°20′34″N 12°23′31″E

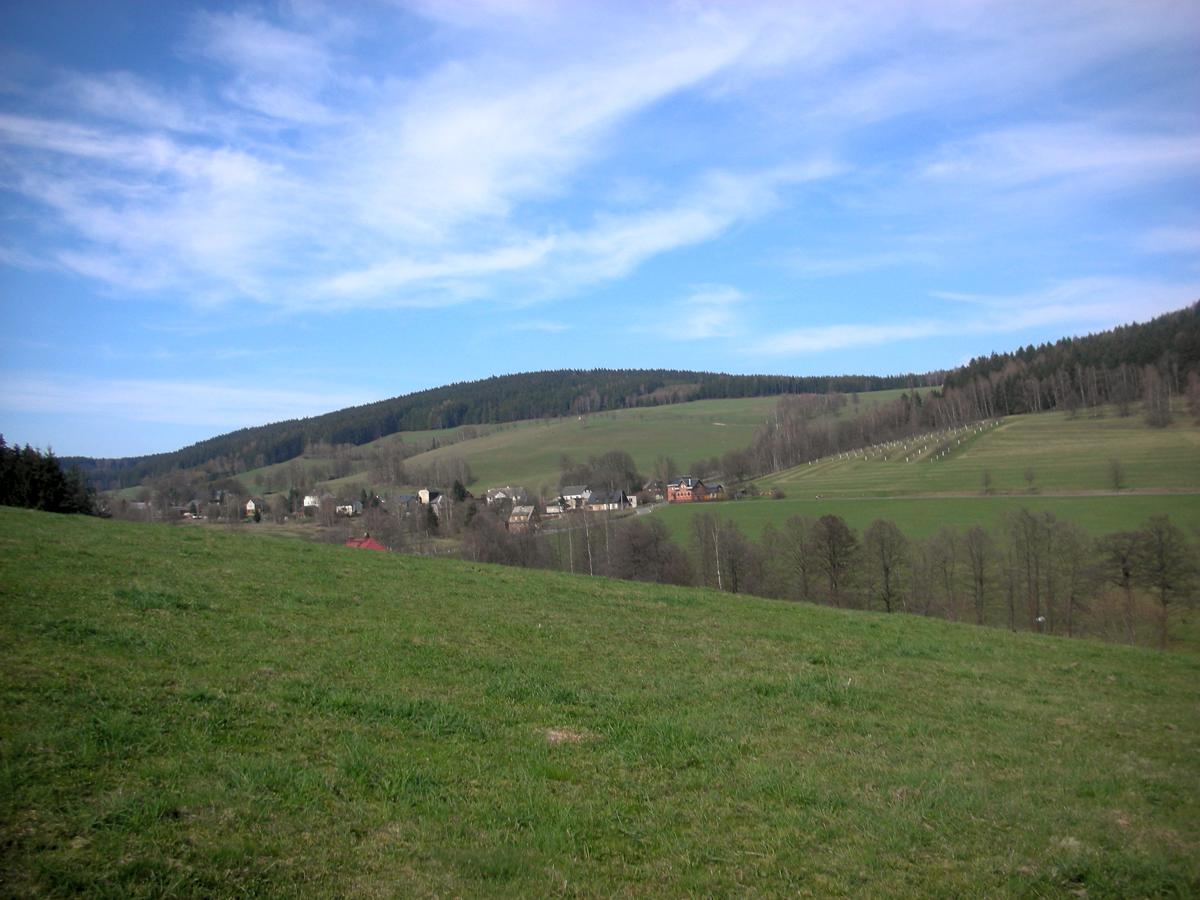
- View of Hoher Brand

Highest point
- Elevation: 802.8 m (2,634 ft)

Geography
- Location: Saxony, Germany

Hoher Brand is a mountain of Saxony, southeastern Germany.
