= Hohes Gras =

Mountain in Germany

Coordinates: 51°18′N 9°21′E

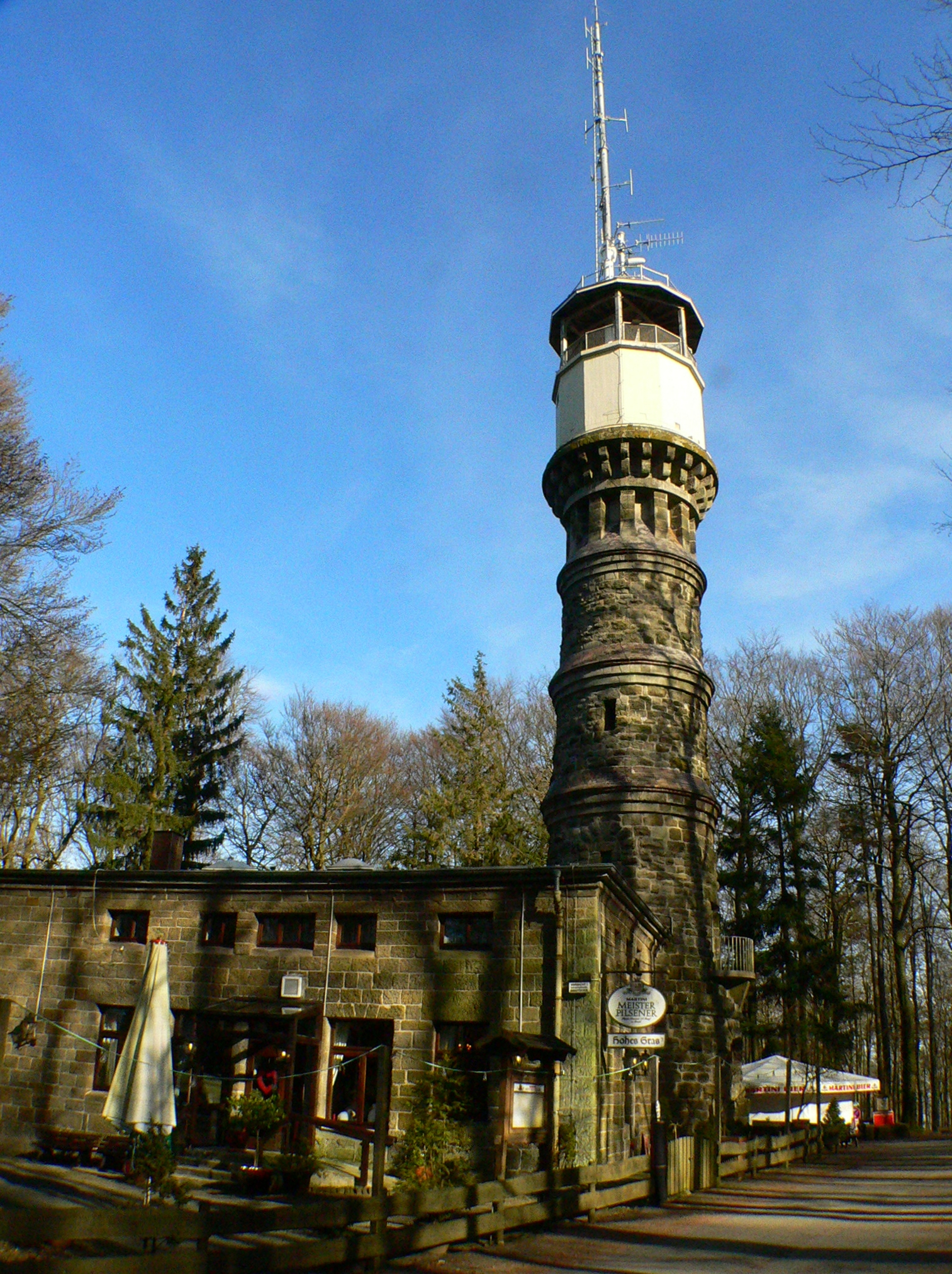
- Observation tower on the "Hohen Gras"

Highest point
- Elevation: 614.8 m (2,017 ft)

Geography
- Location: Hesse, Germany

Hohes Gras is a mountain of Hesse, Germany. There is an observation tower at the summit. A trail for mountain bikers with a lift has been built on the mountain.
