= Deutscher Olymp =

Coordinates: 53°44′32″N 09°04′34″E

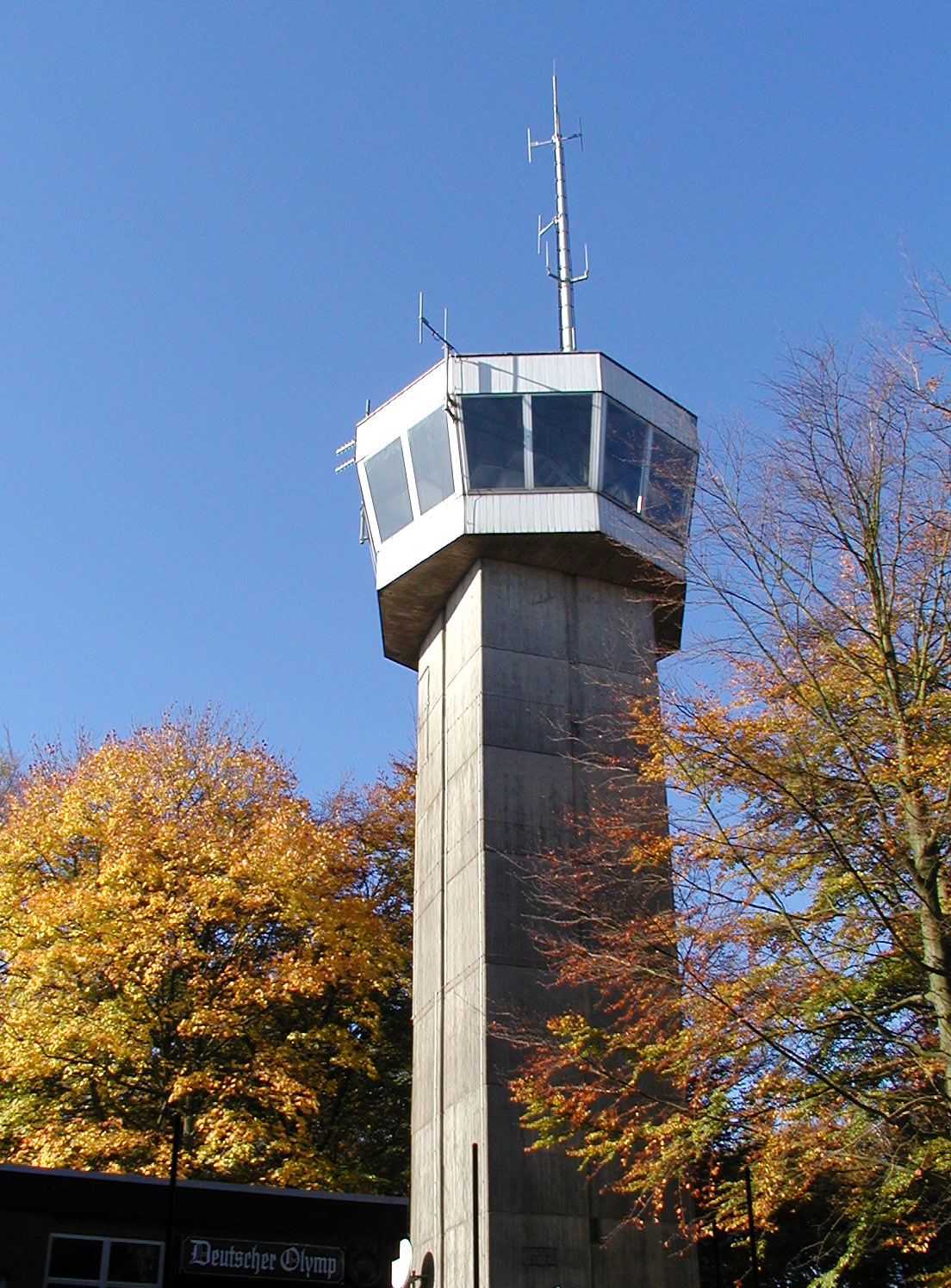
The observation tower

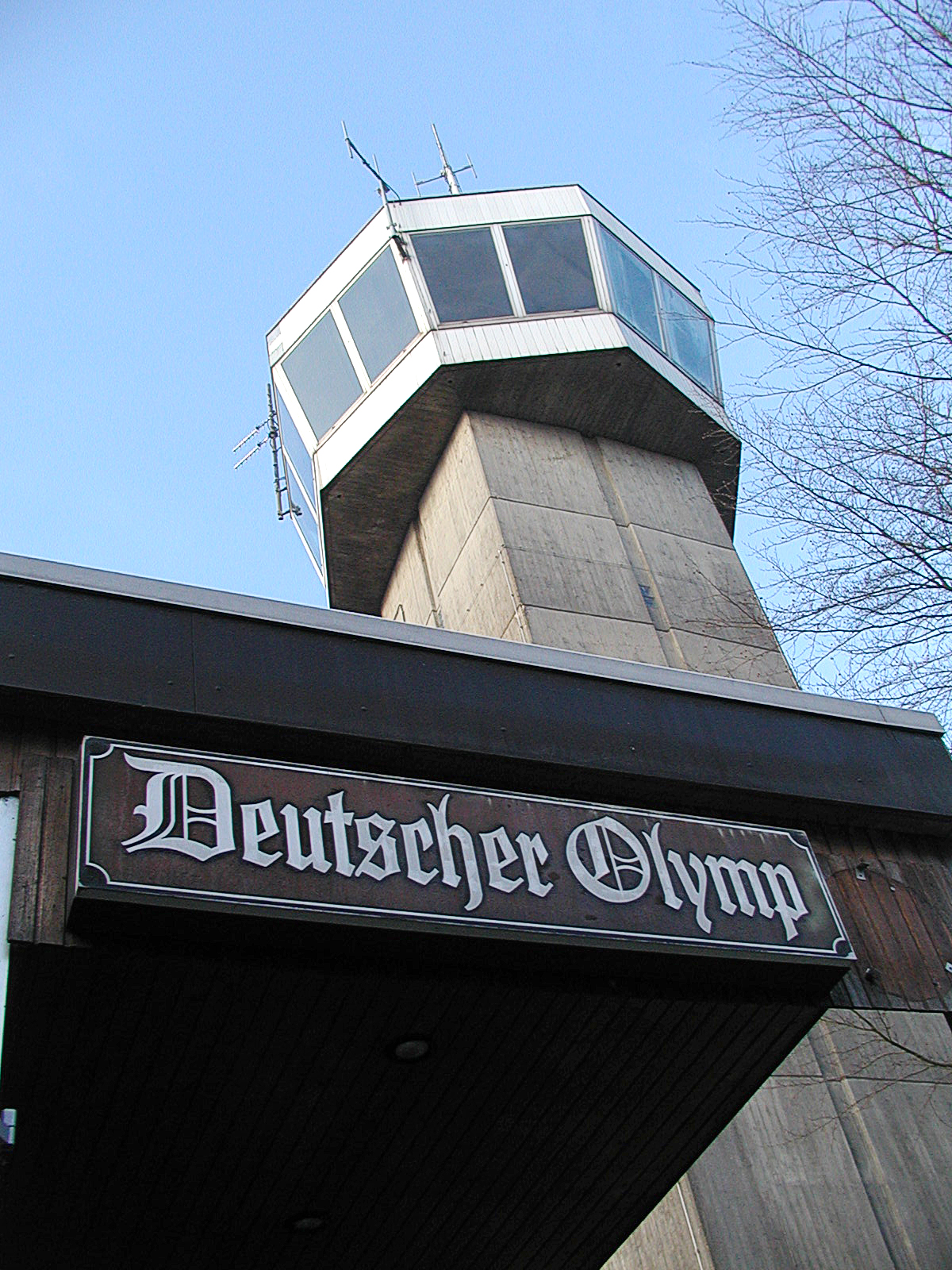
The observation tower

The Deutscher Olymp is a 62-metre-high elevation on the Wingst ridge within the boundary of the homonymous municipality in the district of Cuxhaven in the German state of Lower Saxony.

The Deutscher Olymp was formed from an ice age moraine. On its summit is a 29-metre-high observation tower, from where there are views of the River Elbe and the North Sea.

The hill known as the Deutscher Olymp ("German Mount Olympus") was given this name in 1852 by an innkeeper, thus renaming the 61-metre-high Fahlenberg. In 1974 its wooden observation tower was replaced by a 29-metre-high concrete viewing tower, which now enabled a view from a height of 90 m of the countryside around Kehdingen and Land Hadeln through glass panes. A lift is provided.

In good weather, ships can be seen on the Elbe making their way to Hamburg. On the limit of visibility to the northwest is Cuxhaven with its telecommunication tower, the Friedrich Clemens Gerke Tower and the twin towers of the church in Altenbruch. To the north may be seen the North Sea, the Elbe, the mouth of the Oste and the coast of Schleswig-Holstein with the Brunsbüttel nuclear power station and the large wind farm. From northeast to east the course of the Oste as far as Hemmoor can be seen, from southeast to south are the geest hills of the Westerberg and the Balksee lake. From southwest to west is the expanse of the Hadeln Marsh; its villages are recognisable from their church towers with the aid of a map.

The tower was closed from autumn 2005 to February 2006, because the associated inn was up for sale, but did not find any buyers for a long time. From summer 2006 the observation tower was opened from time to time in cooperation with the municipality of Am Dobrock.
