= Gauss Tower =

Coordinates: 51°28′26″N 9°45′57″E

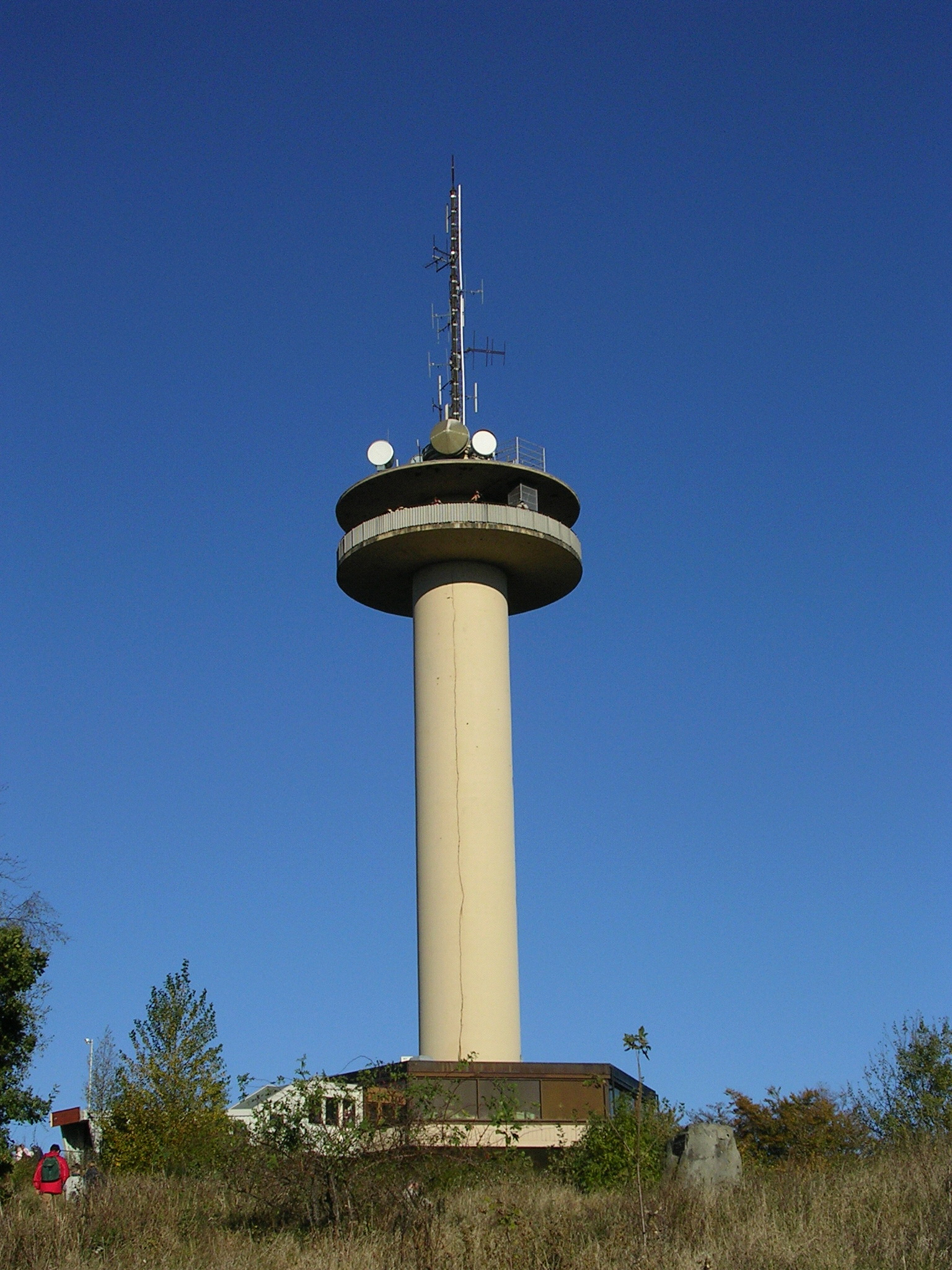
- Gauss Tower
- Interactive map of the Gauss Tower area
- Etymology: Carl Friedrich Gauss

General information
- Type: Observation tower
- Location: Hoher Hagen, Dransfeld, Germany
- Elevation: 528 m (1,732 ft)
- Opened: September 1964

Height
- Height: 51 m (167 ft)

Dimensions
- Diameter: 5 m (16 ft)

Technical details
- Material: Reinforced concrete

The Gauss Tower is a reinforced concrete observation tower on the summit of the Hoher Hagen in Dransfeld, Germany. The tower can be reached directly by car. A restaurant with a panoramic view is located inside the tower.

The tower is named for Carl Friedrich Gauss, who made the large triangle from the Hohen Hagen break into Inselsberg a basis of his survey of Hanover.

== Data ==
- Construction period: 11 months
- Completion: September 1964
- Viewing platform: 528 m over NN
- Tower height: 51 m
- Foundation: 6 m deep, with a diameter of 13 m.
- Diameter of tower shaft: 5 m
  - 1st platform: 18 m (at a value of 14,5 m)
  - Top platform: 13 m
- Elevator capacity: Maximum 8 persons
- Travel time: 55 seconds
- Emergency stairway: 225 steps, leading from the viewing platform to the entrance and/or the cellar

== See also ==
- List of towers
