= Hoher Hagen (Dransfeld) =

Mountain in Germany

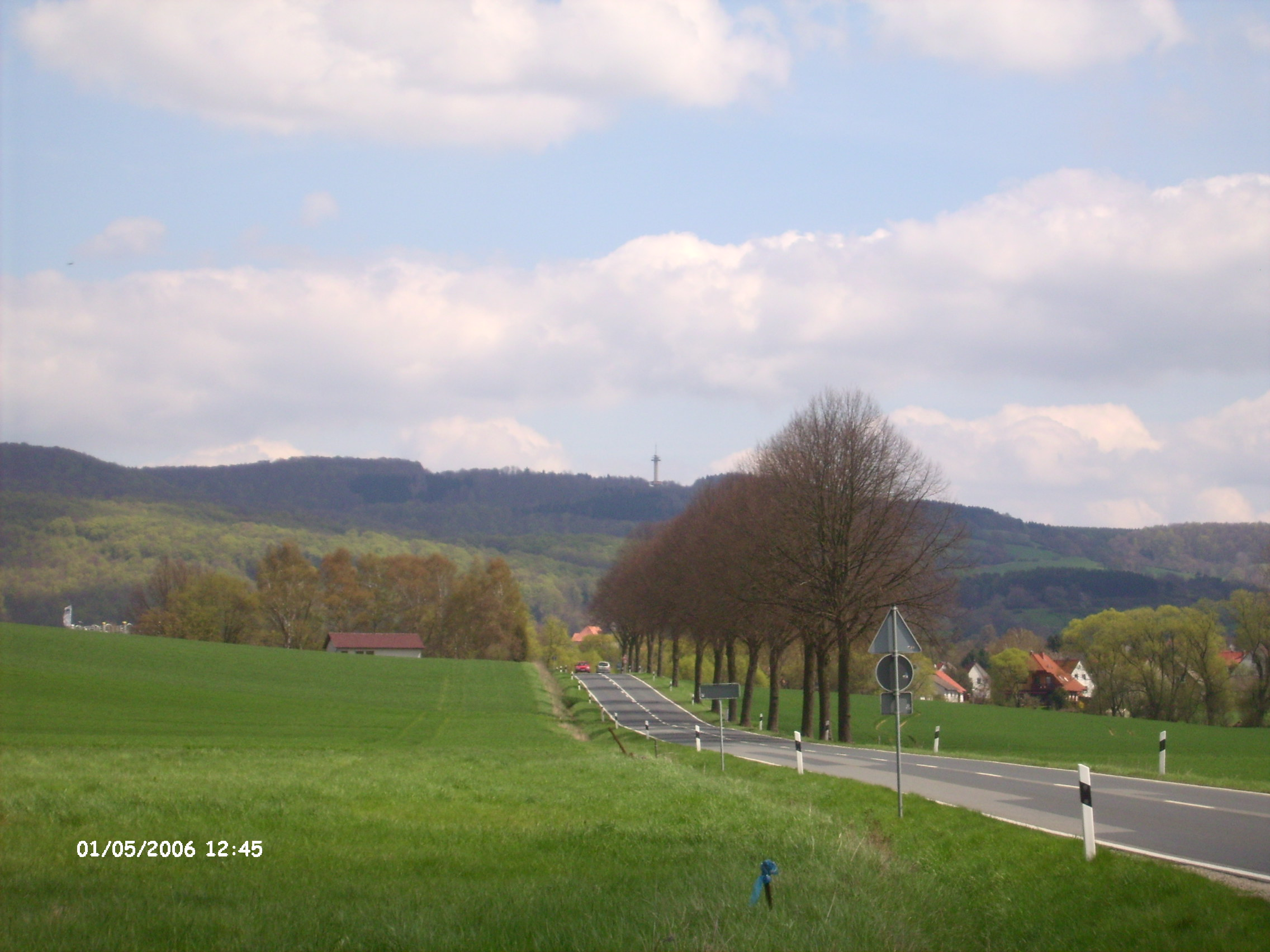
- The Hohe Hagen seen from Scheden. The B 3 is in the foreground.

Highest point
- Elevation: 480 m above sea level (NN) (1,570 ft)
- Coordinates: 51°28′26″N 9°45′57″E

Geography
- Location within Lower Saxony
- Location: Lower Saxony, Germany

Geology
- Mountain type: volcano
- Rock type: basalt extrusion

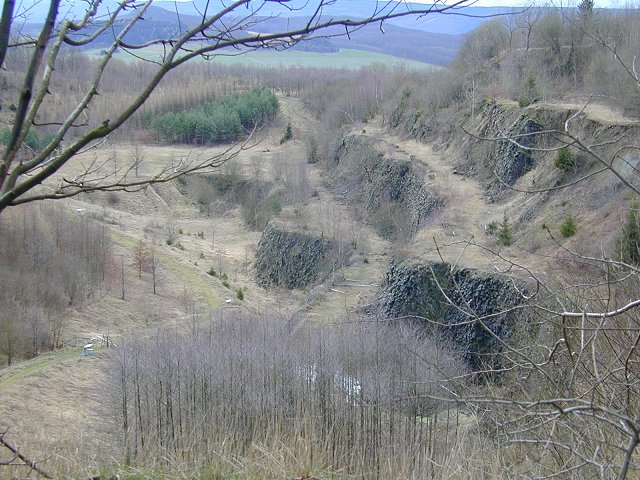
View into the basalt quarry in January 2007

The Hoher Hagen is a volcanic hill that is still 480 m high today, in the Dransfeld Municipal Forest, in the German district of Göttingen in South Lower Saxony.

== Geography ==
The hill, which is located south of Dransfeld, is the highest point in the Dransfeld region by a long way. It lies within the Dransfeld Municipal Forest, a hill massif in the Münden Nature Park that is about halfway between Göttingen to the northeast and Hann. Münden to the southwest.

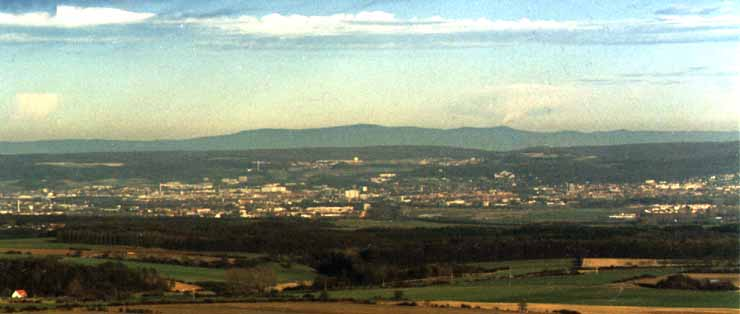
View from Hoher Hagen looking northeast over Göttingen to the Harz

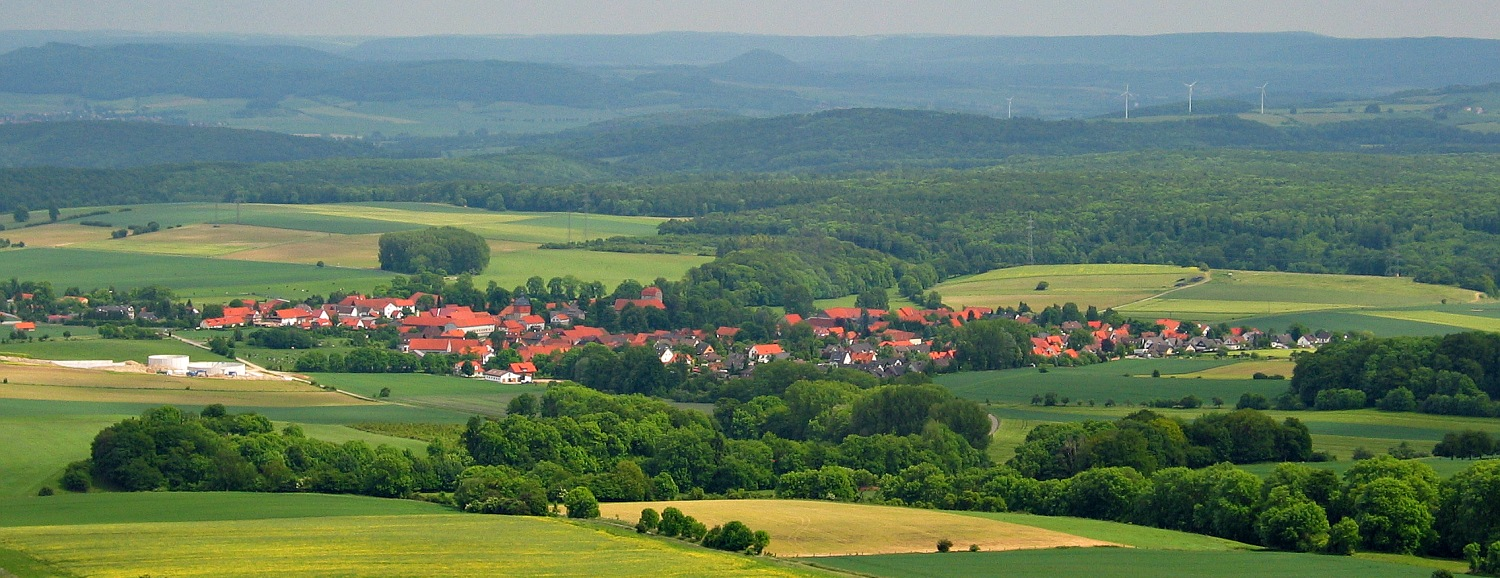
View of Jühnde from the Gauß Tower on the Hoher Hagen

=== Gauß Tower ===
On top of the Hoher Hagen stands the Gauß Tower, a 51 metre high observation tower at 478 m above NN.

== Sources ==
- Rehkop, Friedel: Stadt Dransfeld. Ein geschichtlicher Rückblick vom 19. Jahrhundert bis zur Frühzeit. Vol. 1. Horb am Neckar: Geiger-Verlag, 1999. S.196-200,352-360,387-397. ISBN 3-89570-561-6
