= Kulpenberg =

Mountain in Germany

Coordinates: 51°24′42″N 11°04′39″E

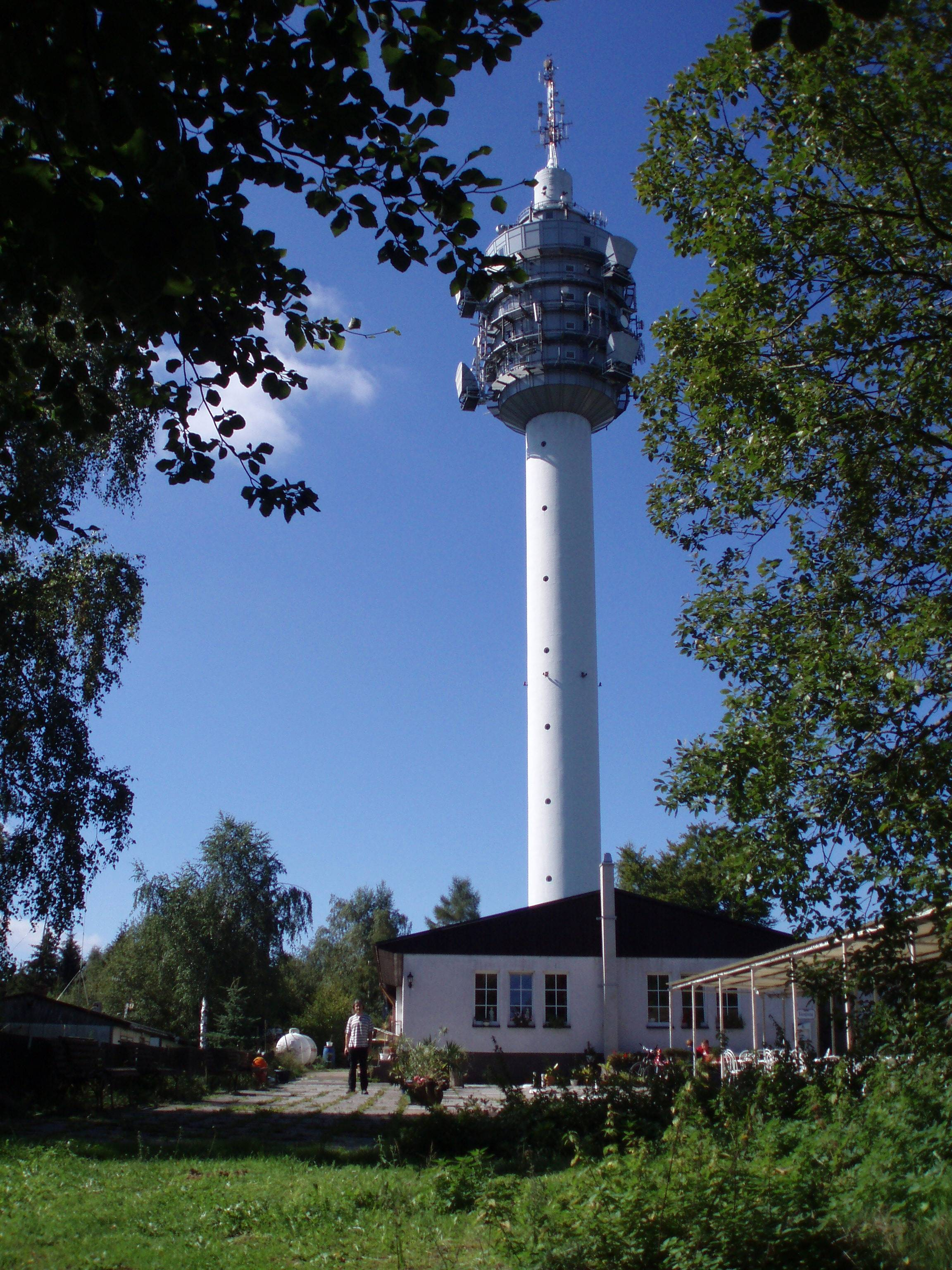
A TV tower on the Kulpenberg summit

The Kulpenberg is a 477-metre-high (1,565 ft) high mountain in the Kyffhäuser mountains, Thuringia, Germany. On it is the Kulpenberg TV tower, a telecommunication tower.
