= Kasseler Kuppe =

Mountain of Hesse, Germany

Coordinates: 51°13′42″N 9°51′48″E

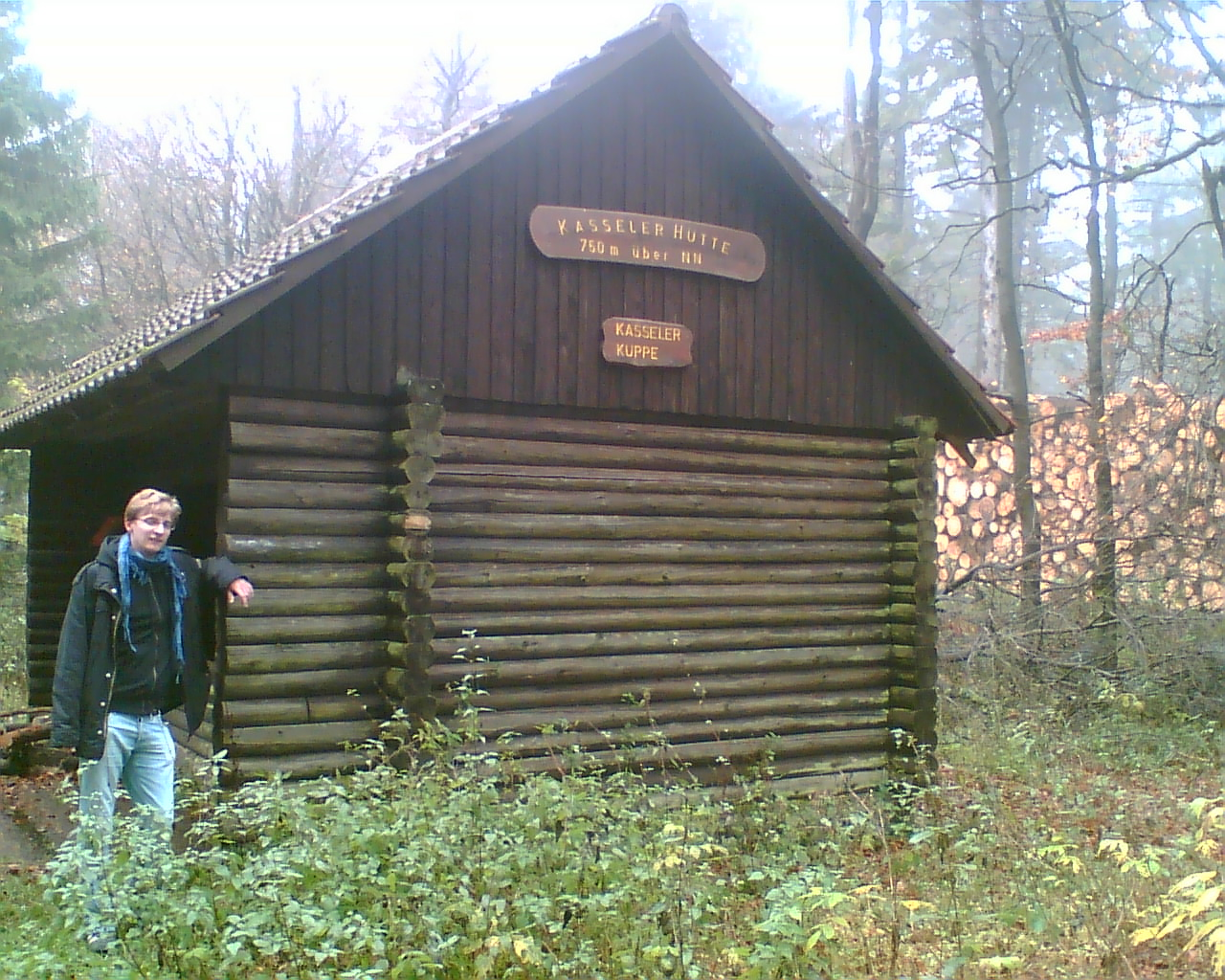

Highest point
- Elevation: 753.6 m (2,472 ft)

Geography
- Location: Hesse, Germany

Kasseler Kuppe is a mountain of Hesse, Germany.
