= Reuberg =

- Location within Lower Saxony

Highest point
- Peak: Main summit of the ridge
- Elevation: 328.2 m above NN

Geography
- Country: Germany
- State: Lower Saxony
- Range coordinates: 51°57′56″N 9°47′08″E
- Parent range: Lower Saxon Hills

Geology
- Orogeny: Hercynian

The Reuberg is a ridge, up to 328.2 m above NN, in the Lower Saxon Hills in the districts of Holzminden and Hildesheim in the German state of Lower Saxony.

== Location ==
The Reuberg lies in the western part of the Leine Uplands, a northern section of the Lower Saxon Hills. It measures about 3.5 kilometres in length and is situated within the triangle formed by the settlements of Alfeld, Delligsen and Duingen. It also lies between Brunkensen to the north, Warzen to the east, Gerzen to the southeast, Grünenplan some distance away to the east-southeast, Hohenbüchen to the west and some way from Coppengrave to the northwest.

The hill ranges around the Reuberg are the Duinger Berg to the northwest, Külf to the north, the Sieben Berge to the east, the Steinberg to the southeast, the ridge of Hils to the southwest and further to the west the knife-edge of the Ith, part of which belongs to the Weser Uplands-Schaumburg-Hamelin Nature Park. The valley of the Glene, a southwestern tributary of the River Leine, runs over to the Duinger Berg.

On the eponymous main summit of the Reuberg (328.2 m above NN), stands a transmission mast belonging to Deutsche Telekom. On the northwestern slopes of the ridge are the Lippold Cave and the cultural monument of Gleneburg. The B 3 federal road runs past the Reuberg some way to the east.

== Hiking ==
Several forest tracks and footpaths pass over the Reuberg, including one that runs over the crest from the valley of the Glene to Warzen. The E11 European long distance path runs past the hill between Grünenplan and Gerzen where the Reuberg transitions to the Steinberg.
