= Duinger Berg =

Hill range in Germany

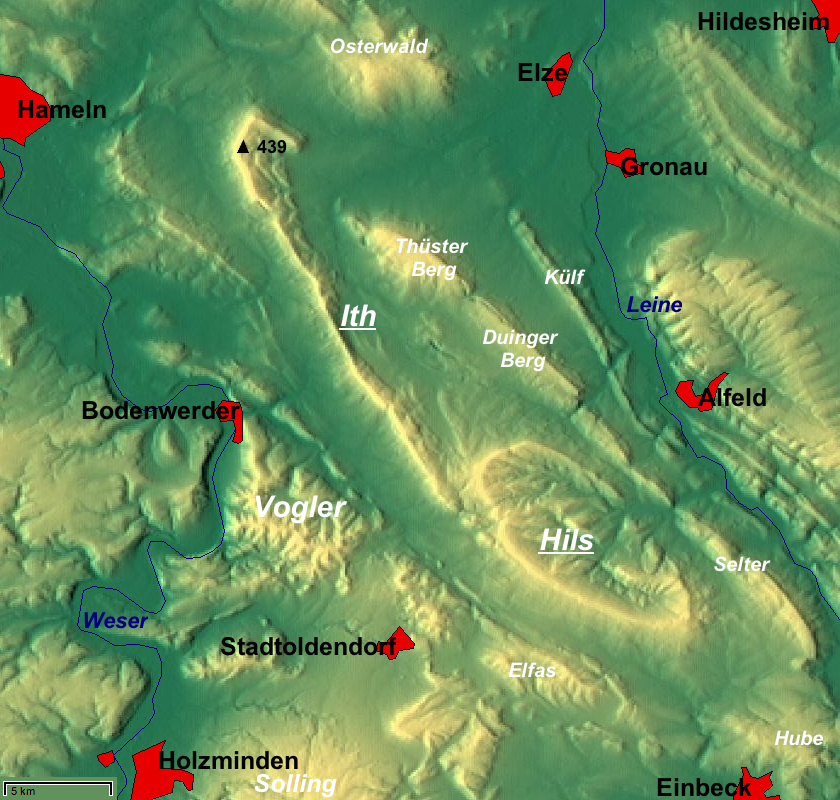
- Overview map with the Duinger Berg just NE of centre

Highest point
- Peak: Babenstein
- Elevation: 331 m above NN

Dimensions
- Length: 7.5 km (4.7 mi)

Geography
- Country: Germany
- State: Lower Saxony
- Range coordinates: 52°00′12″N 9°44′04″E
- Parent range: Leine Uplands

Geology
- Rock age(s): Middle Jurassic, Upper Jurassic
- Rock type(s): limestone, marl, claystone, siltstone, sandstone

The Duinger Berg is a hill range, up to 331 m above NN, in the Lower Saxon Hills and the district of Landkreis in the German state of Lower Saxony.

== Location ==
The Duinger Berg lies in the western part of the Leine Uplands, a northern section of the Lower Saxon Hills. Its highest summit is the Babenstein and it measures some 7.5 km in length. It is situated in the triangle formed by the settlements of Eime, Alfeld and Duingen and also lies between Deinsen and Lübbrechtsen to the north, Rott, Hoyershausen and Lütgenholzen to the east, Brunkensen to the southeast, Coppengrave to the south, Duingen to the southwest and Weenzen and Marienhagen to the northwest.

The main summit of the Duinger Berg is the Babenstein (331 m above NN). A little further southeast is the Kikedal (319 m above NN).

Northwest of the Duinger Berg is the ridge of the Thüster Berg, to the east is the Külf, southeast the Reuberg and west the knife-edge of the Ith, part of which lies within the Weser Uplands-Schaumburg-Hamelin Nature Park. The valley of the Glene, a southwestern tributary of the Leine leads to the Reuberg.

The B 240 runs past the Duinger Berg to the northwest. The B 3 runs by to the east.

== Hiking ==
Numerous forest tracks run over the Duinger Berg. One hiking trail runs over the crest of the ridge from Marienhagen to Brunkensen.
