= Steinberg (Leine Uplands) =

- Location within Lower Saxony

Highest point
- Peak: main summit of the ridge
- Elevation: 300.3 m above NN

Geography
- Country: Germany
- State: Lower Saxony
- Districts: Holzminden and Hildesheim
- Range coordinates: 51°57′08″N 9°48′30″E
- Parent range: Lower Saxon Hills

Geology
- Orogeny: Low hill range

The Steinberg (German pronunciation: [ˈʃtaɪ̯nˌbɛʁk]) is a small hill ridge, up to 300.3 m above NN, in the Lower Saxon Hills in the districts of Holzminden and Hildesheim in the German state of Lower Saxony.

== Location ==
The Steinberg lies in the western half of the Leine Uplands, which in turn are the northern part of the Lower Saxon Hills. It is about 2.8 kilometres long and is situated in the triangle formed by the villages of Alfeld, Freden and Delligsen. It lies between Gerzen to the north, Föhrste and Wispenstein to the east, Imsen to the southeast, Delligsen to the south and Grünenplan some distance to the northwest.

Nordwest of the Steinberg lies the Reuberg, on the other side of the River Leine are the Sieben Berge to the north and the Sackwald to the east. To the southeast is the Selter and to the southwest and west the Hils. The valley of the Wispe, a southwest tributary of the Leine, separates it from the Selter.

The B 3 runs past the Steinberg to the east and southeast.

== Geology and landscape ==
The Steinberg is made of limestone that has undergone folding. On its crest and its, in places, steep flanks, there are limestone crags, usually hidden in the woods, like the Kippnäse in the southeast. Somewhat to the southeast main summit of the ridge (300.3 m above NN) there is an old quarry, which is now designated as a nature reserve.

The Steinberg is thickly wooded, especially by deciduous stands. In the northeast is the Imsen Forest and in the southwest the Delligsen Forest.

== Hiking ==
A number of forest tracks and footpaths run over the Steinberg, including one below the crest that runs through the range in a northwest to southeast direction. The E11 European long distance path runs past the ridge in the area where it transitions to the Reuberg between Grünenplan and Gerzen.
