= Thüster Berg =

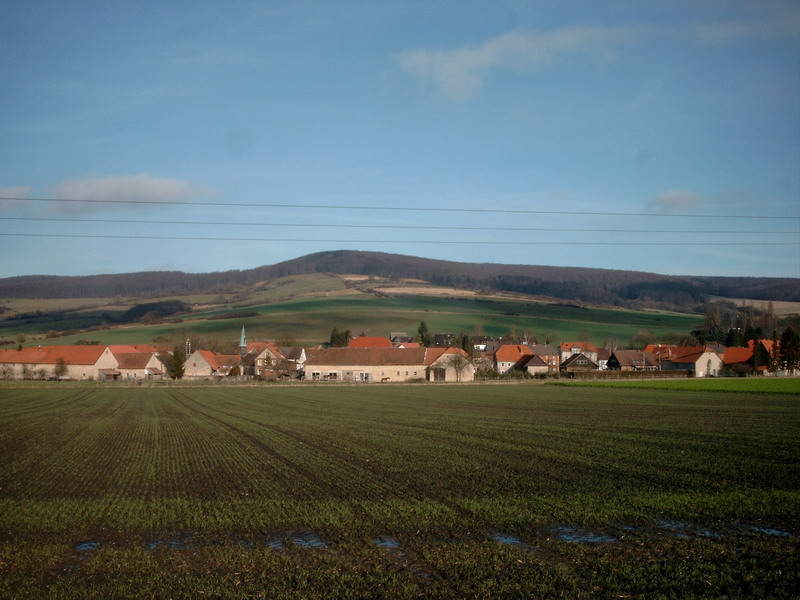
- The Thüste in front of the Thüster Berg

Highest point
- Peak: Kanstein
- Elevation: 441 m above NN

Dimensions
- Length: 7 km (4.3 mi)

Geography
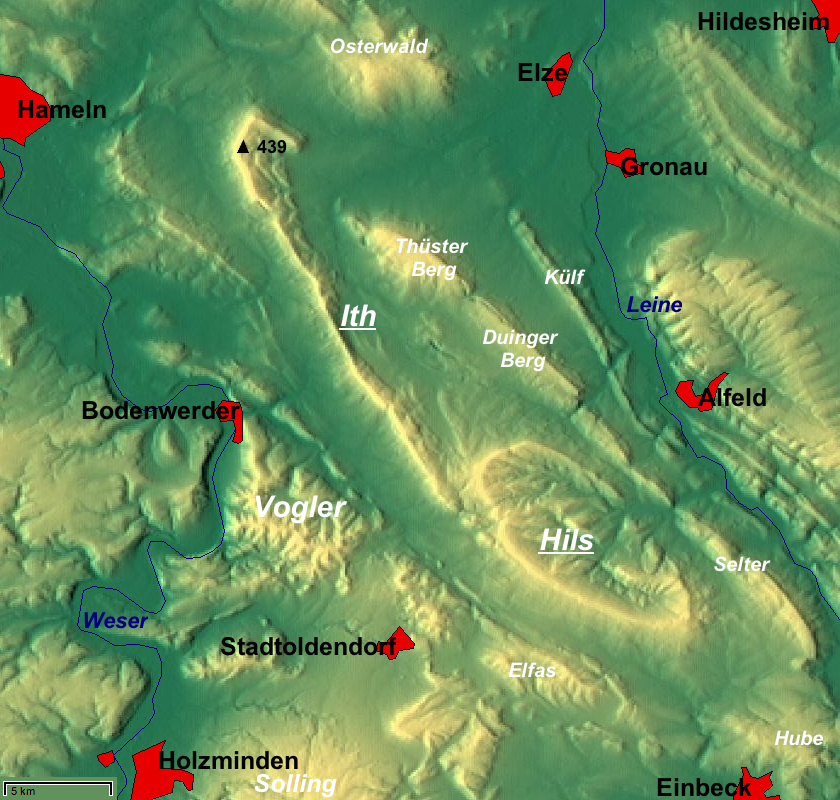
- Overview map: The Thüster Berg is in the upper centre
- State: Lower Saxony
- Range coordinates: 52°03′28″N 9°37′25″E
- Parent range: Leine Uplands, Lower Saxon Hills

Geology
- Rock age: Upper Jurassic
- Rock type(s): Limestone (Thüster limestone), claystone, marl

The Thüster Berg is a ridge, up to 441 m above NN, in the Lower Saxon Hills in central Germany. It is situated in the districts of Hameln-Pyrmont and Hildesheim in the federal state of Lower Saxony.

== Location ==
The Thüster Berg lies within a triangle formed by the villages of Eime, Duingen and Salzhemmendorf in the western half of the Leine Uplands, which itself is in the northern part of the Lower Saxon Hills. It is about 7 kilometres (4.3 mi) long and its highest peak is the Kanstein. It lies between Hemmendorf and Oldendorf in the north, Ahrenfeld, Deilmissen and Deinsen in the south, Marienhagen in the southeast, Weenzen and Thüste in the south, Levedagsen and the Domäne Eggersen in the west and the village of Salzhemmendorf to the northwest.

North of the Thüster Berg is the Osterwald, to the east the Külf, to the southeast the Duinger Berg and to the west the Ith. The River Saale, a southwestern tributary of the Leine flows to the west and north of the ridge. Its northwestern part belongs to the Weser Uplands Schaumburg-Hamelin Nature Park.

The B 1 federal highway runs past the Thüster Berg to the north and the B 240 to the southeast.

== Geology and landscape ==
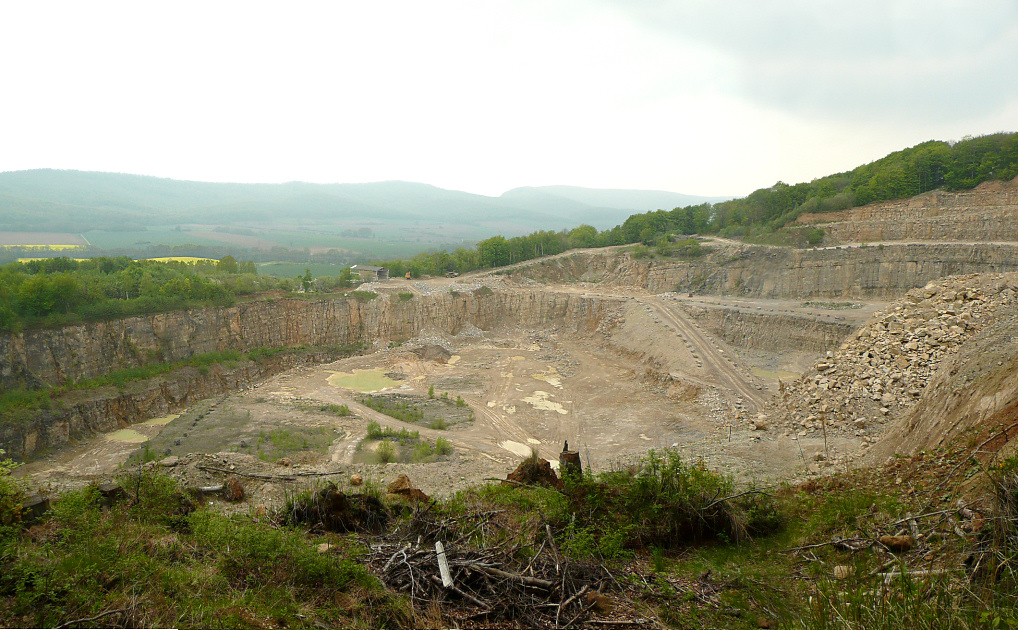
Quarry on the Thüster Berg

The Thüster Berg is an upfold of Thüster limestone. On its steeply sloping northern flanks there are several limestone crags, mostly hidden in forest, which have names such as Eckturm, Dreckturm, Falkenturm and Liebesnadel (literally: "Corner Tower", "Mud Tower", "Falcon Tower" and "Needle of Love"). The rock ledge of the Eckturm (380 m above NN) juts out of the forest towards the northwest below the summit of the Kanstein and forms a natural observation platform. There are disused limestone quarries on the southwestern side of the ridge.

The Thüster Berg is densely wooded, especially with stands of deciduous trees. Amongst the species of tree that thrive here are birch and pine.

== Towers ==
On the Kanstein, the main summit (441 m above NN) of the Thüster Berg, stands an observation tower, known as the Löns Tower (Lönsturm, 440 m above NN) and about 1 km further east-southeast is a telecommunication tower (433 m above NN).

== Walking ==
Numerous forest tracks run over the Thüster Berg. One of them runs over the crest of the ridge from Salzhemmendorf to Marienhagen past the Eckturm, Löns Tower and telecommunication tower.
