= Duingen (Samtgemeinde) =

Former Samtgemeinde in Germany

Coordinates: 52.000°N 9.700°E

Duingen is a former Samtgemeinde ("collective municipality") in the district of Hildesheim, in Lower Saxony, Germany. Its seat was in the village Duingen. On 1 November 2016 it was merged into the new Samtgemeinde Leinebergland.

The Samtgemeinde Duingen consisted of the following municipalities:

1. Coppengrave
2. Duingen
3. Hoyershausen
4. Marienhagen
5. Weenzen
