= Lower Saxon Hills =

Natural region in Germany

Coordinates: 52°0′0″N 9°0′0″E

The Lower Saxon Hills (German: Niedersächsisches Bergland) are one of the 73 natural regions in Germany defined by the Federal Agency for Nature Conservation (BfN). Geographically it covers roughly the same area as the Weser Uplands (German: Weserbergland) in its wider sense.

The region is part of Germany's Central Uplands with hills ranging up to 528 m above sea level (NN) in height that extend across northeast North Rhine-Westphalia, southern Lower Saxony and northern Hesse. It is classified as region number D 36 by the BfN; its full name being the Niedersächsisches Bergland (mit Weser- und Leine-Bergland (Lower Saxon Hills, including the Weser and Leine Hills).

D 36 is a newly defined region that incorporates 3 geographical units from the old system: numbers 36, 37 and 53, and includes all parts of the Weser Uplands (Weserbergland) in both its narrower and a wider sense. That said, all three elements of the region, despite their misleading names, cover far more than is generally meant in everyday language or in atlases by the term Weserbergland.

In addition the Weser-Leine Hills sub-division (37) includes the whole of the Leine Uplands (Leinebergland), whilst the Harz mountains, admittedly are only partly in Lower Saxony, are clearly older in geological time scale and have been given their own natural region (D37) rather than being grouped with the lower Saxon Hills.

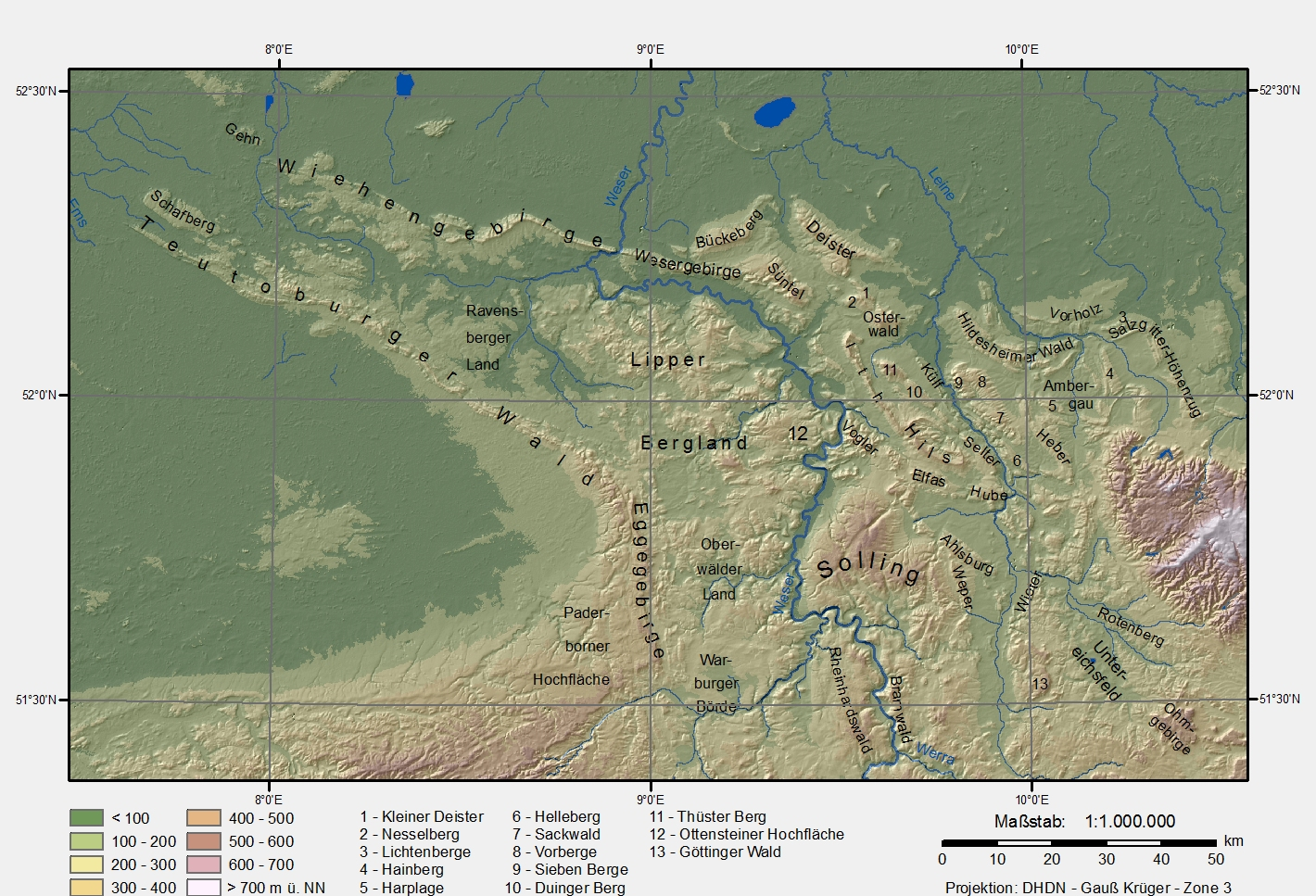
Map of the Lower Saxon Hills or Weser Uplands

== Natural divisions ==
The following tables show the landscape sub-divisions in the Lower Saxon Hills.
Those regions which are normally considered part of the Weser Uplands in its narrower sense are indicated by (W); similarly the which are normally included in the Leine Uplands are annotated with (L):

- 53 Lower Weser Uplands
  - 530 Bielefeld Osning
  - 531 Ravensberg Hills
  - 532 Eastern Wiehen Hills (W)
  - 533 Lübbecke Loessland
  - 534 Tecklenburg Osning
  - 535 Osnabrück Uplands (including the Gehn)
  - 536 Western Wiehen Hills

In addition to the Osning (=Teutoburg Forest) and the Wiehen Hills, historic landscapes like the Tecklenburger Land und Osnabrücker Land are also part of this region.

- 36 Upper Weser Uplands
  - 360 Warburg Börde
  - 361 Oberwälder Land including Nethegau
  - 362 Paderborn Plateau
  - 363 Egge
  - 364 Lippe Uplands
  - 365 Pyrmont Uplands
    - Ottenstein Plateau (W)
  - 366 Rinteln-Hameln Weserland (W)
  - 367 Holzminden Weser Valley (W)
  - 368 Weser Gorge of Bodenwerder (W)

The Weser Valley between Bad Karlshafen and Porta Westfalica also belongs to this area.

- 37 Weser-Leine Uplands

  - 370 Solling (W), Bramwald (W) and Reinhardswald (W)
  - 371 Solling Foreland
    - Vogler (W)
    - Elfas (L)
    - Ahlsburg (L)
    - Weper (L)
  - 372 Leine-Ilme Basin (L)
  - 373 Göttingen-Northeim Forest (L)
    - Wieter
    - Göttingen Forest
  - 374 Eichsfelder Basin (Goldene Mark)
    - Rotenberg
    - Goldene Mark
  - 375 Lower Eichsfeld
    - Ohm Hills
    - Bleicheröde Hills
  - 376 Southwest Harz Foreland
    - Hube (L)
  - 377 Alfeld Uplands (Ith-Hils ridges) (L)
    - Ith (L)
    - Thüster Berg (L)
    - Külf (L)
    - Sieben Berge (L)
    - Vorberge (L)
    - Duinger Berg (L)
    - Sackwald (L)
    - Hils (L)
    - Rettberg (L)
    - Reuberg (L)
    - Steinberg (L)
    - Selter (L)
    - Helleberg (L)
  - 378 Calenberg Uplands
    - Bückeberg
    - Deister
    - Harrl
    - Kleiner Deister
    - Nesselberg
    - Osterwald
    - Süntel (W)
    - Wesergebirge (W)
  - 379 Innerste Uplands
    - Hildesheim Forest
    - Vorholz
    - Salzgitter Ridge
      - Lichtenberge
    - Hainberg
    - Ambergau
    - Harplage
    - Heber

== Literature ==
- Elkins, T.H. (1972). Germany (3rd ed.). London: Chatto & Windus. ISBN 0-7010-0087-2.
- Brunotte, Ernst; Garleff, Karsten (1989). "Structural landforms and planation surfaces in southern Lower Saxony". In Frank Ahnert (ed.). Landforms and Landform evolution in West Germany. Catena Supplement (15). Brunswick. pp. 151–161.
