= Selter (hills) =

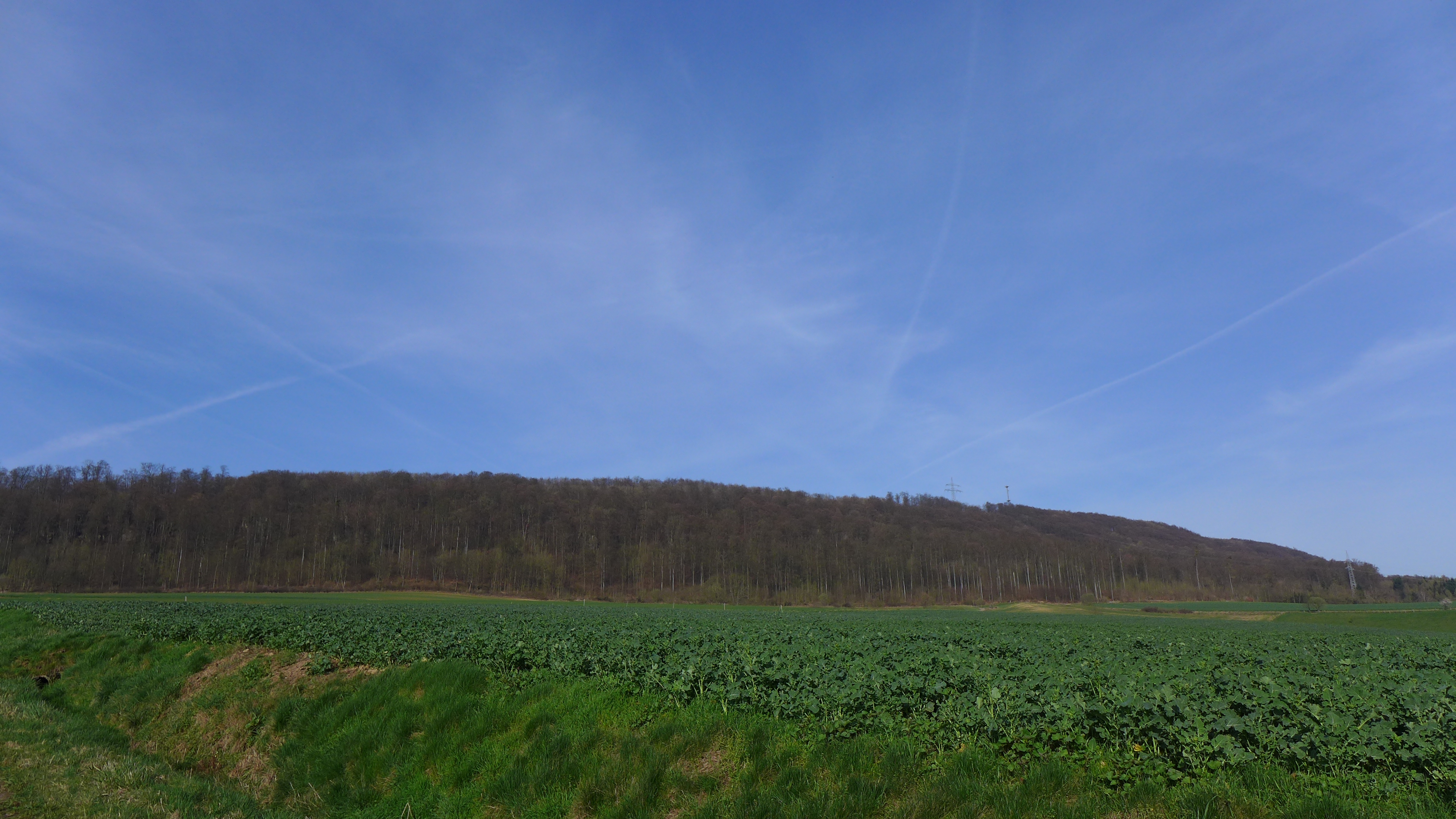

Highest point
- Peak: Hohe Egge (Selter)
- Elevation: 395 m above NN

Dimensions
- Length: 11 km (6.8 mi)

Geography
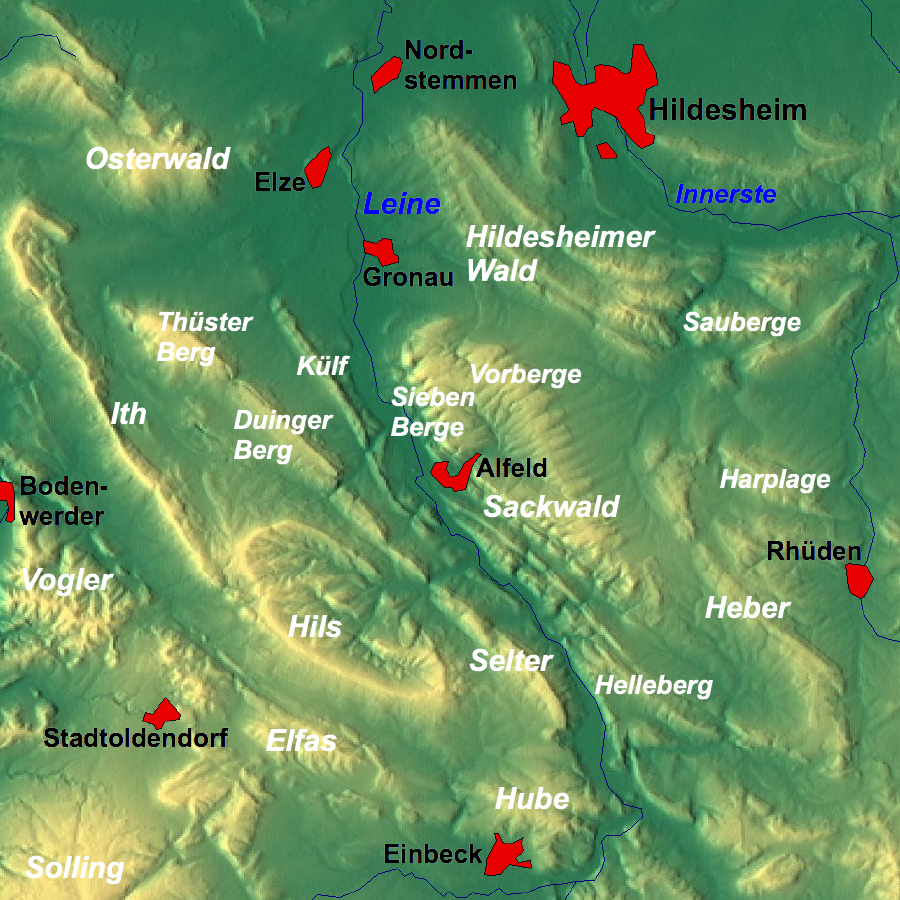
- Overview map: Selter roughly lower centre, Ith and Hils to the left of it with the Wallensen Basin in between
- Country: Germany
- State: Lower Saxony
- Range coordinates: 51°54′18″N 9°53′32″E
- Parent range: Leine Uplands

Geology
- Rock age(s): Middle Jurassic, Upper Jurassic
- Rock type(s): limestone, marl, claystone, siltstone, sandstone

The Selter is a ridge, up to 395 m above NN, in the Lower Saxon Hills in the districts of Hildesheim, Holzminden and Northeim in the German state of Lower Saxony.

== Geography ==
=== Location ===
The Selter is a narrow ridge in the Alfeld Uplands, part of the Leine Uplands in the Lower Saxon Hills. It is about 11 kilometres long and lies in the rectangle formed by the villages of Alfeld, Freden, Kreiensen and Delligsen. It lies between Delligsen to the northwest, Imsen to the north, Freden to the east, Erzhausen to the southeast, Greene to the south-southeast, Naensen to the south, Stroit and Ammensen to the southwest and Varrigsen to the west. Its virtual centre lies near Freden.

=== Hills ===
Amongst the hills of the Selter are the following − sorted by height in metres above sea level (NN)

- Hohe Egge (395.0 m)
- Kohlberg (ca. 380 m)
- Thödingsberg (ca. 366 m)
- Nollen (300.0 m)
- Hasenberg (ca. 290 m)
- Spielberg (ca. 290 m)
- Ziegenrücken (ca. 260 m)
