= Bloße Zelle =

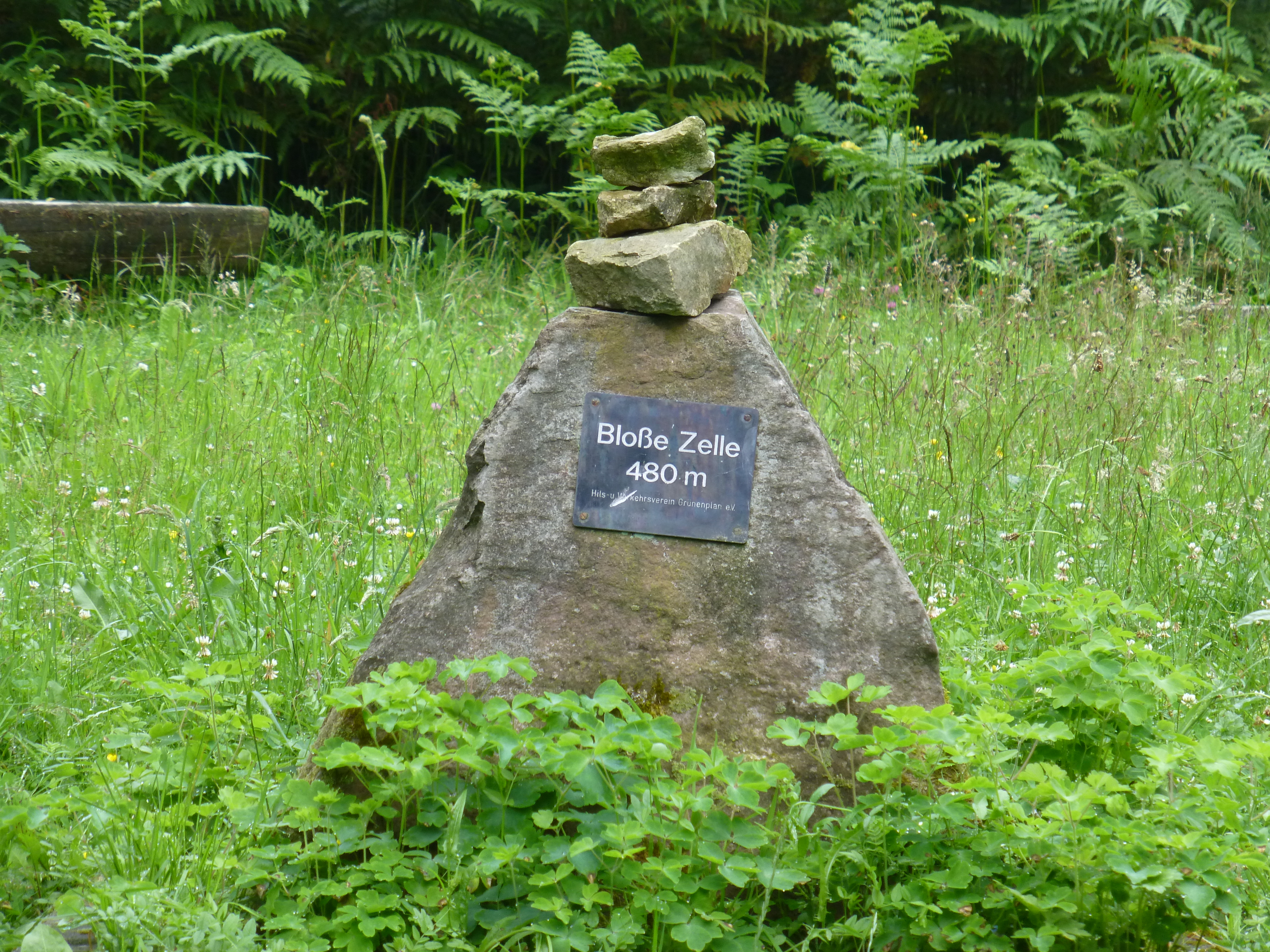

Highest point
- Elevation: 480.4 m above sea level (NN) (1,576 ft)
- Prominence: 237 m ↓ Hillebach-Lenne-watershed north of Eimen-Vorwohle → Solling
- Isolation: 18 km → Großer Ahrensberg, Solling
- Coordinates: 51°57′29″N 9°41′23″E

Geography
- Location within Lower Saxony
- Location: Lower Saxony, Germany
- Parent range: Hils, Alfeld Uplands, Leine Uplands

The Bloße Zelle is, at 480 m, the highest elevation on the Hils and in the Alfeld Uplands (Ith-Hils Upland). It lies on the boundary of the districts of Holzminden and Hildesheim, a good 4 kilometres northeast of Eschershausen.

With a topographic isolation of 18 kilometres and a prominence of about 235 metres, the Hils and the Blöße are among the loftiest ridges and summits, respectively, in the Lower Saxon Hills.
