= Weser Uplands-Schaumburg-Hamelin Nature Park =

Nature park in Lower Saxony, Germany

Coordinates: 52.2033°N 9.3472°E

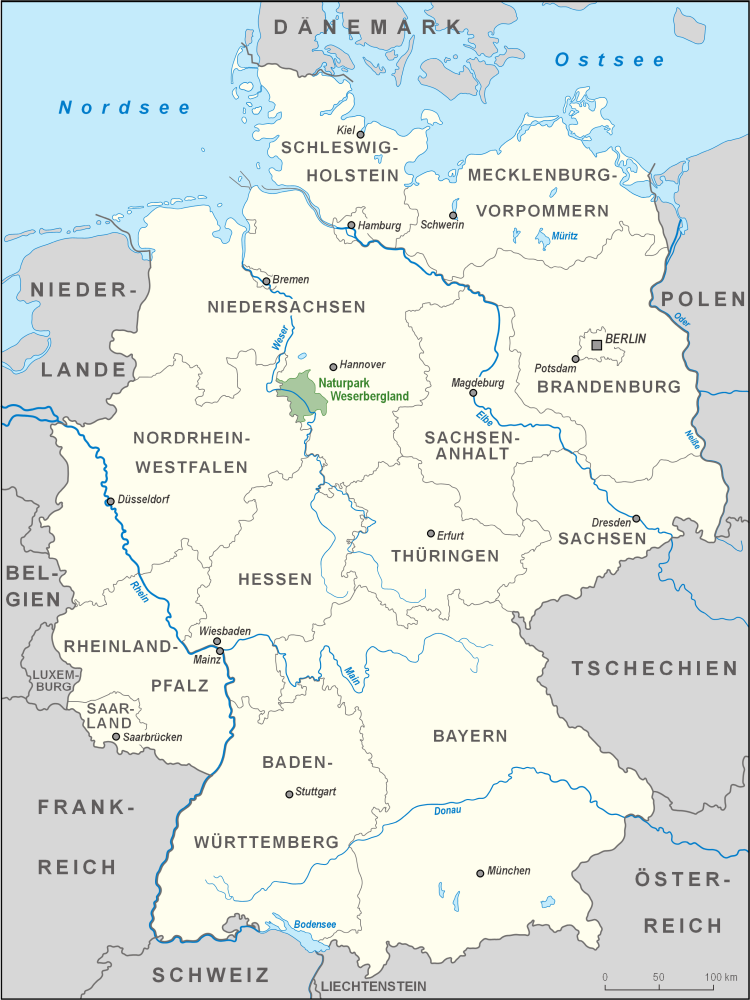
Location of the Weser Uplands Nature Park

The Weser Uplands-Schaumburg-Hamelin Nature Park (German: Naturpark Weserbergland Schaumburg-Hameln) lies on the northern edge of the German Central Uplands where it transitions to the North German Plain, about 50 kilometres (31 mi) southwest of Hanover. The sponsor of the nature park, which was founded in 1975, is the state of Lower Saxony. The park extends along the Weser valley between Rinteln and Hamelin and includes parts of the Schaumburg Land, Calenberg, Lippe and Pyrmont Uplands from Bad Nenndorf in the north to Bad Pyrmont in the south, Bückeburg and Bad Eilsen in the west and Bad Münder and Osterwald in the east. Its highest elevation is in the Süntel hills.

== Location ==
Bordered in the north by the forested ridges of the Bückeberg and the Deister, the nature park covers almost 1,000 square kilometres (390 sq mi) from the eastern Weser Hills, Harrl and Süntel running along both sides of the River Weser southwards to the Ith ridge, the Osterwald and the Thüster Berg, through a very varied landscape of wooded, rolling hills and small valleys with a myriad streams and rivers. In the Süntel, the Ith and on the Kanstein rocky crags tower over the countryside. A colourful mix of nature reserves and protected landscapes, towns, several spas and small villages and castles of the Weser Renaissance period mean that the nature park is a popular local recreation and holiday destination in the north German region.

== Features ==
=== Architecture ===
Architectural sights in the area include the:

- Weser Renaissance buildings, like the castles of Hämelschenburg and Schwöbber
- Medieval market place in the former university town of Rinteln
- Old town centres (Altstädte) of Bückeburg of Hamelin
- Diverse spa towns of Bad Eilsen, Bad Nenndorf, Bad Münder am Deister and Bad Pyrmont
- Numerous early medieval churches, abbeys, convents and town walls

=== Nature ===
Notable nature areas include the:

- 800 hectares (2,000 acres) nature reserve of Hohenstein on the Süntel
- 240 hectares (590 acres) nature reserve of Saubrink/Oberberg Forest
- nature reserve of Weser Hills Crest (Kamm des Wesergebirges)
- very rare, native dwarf beeches (Süntelbuchen)
- Dripstone caves

The most northerly examples of Hartstein rock in Germany occur in the Weser Uplands. As a result, the landscapes and natural regions of the Weser hills are home to numerous quarries belonging to several companies that extract corallian and oolitic Hartstein. These include the Messingsberg near Steinbergen, the Wülpker-Egge near Bückeburg and the Papenbrink near Kleinenbremen in the Weser Hills; as well as the Riesenberg near Langenfeld/Hessisch-Oldendorf and the Mattenberg near Hamelspringe in the Süntel. Schaumburg citizens have founded the Friends of the Weser Uplands and Schaumburg Action Group (Aktionsgemeinschaft Weserbergland - Schaumburger Freunde) to protest the "destruction of the landscape" by the quarry companies.

=== Leisure activities ===
- The amusement park Rasti-Land
- Open-air and indoor swimming pools, swimming lakes
- Golf course
- Cycle and footpaths through hills and valleys along the Weser
- Boat trips on the Weser
- Winter sports on the higher hills
- Rock climbing
- Show caves and mining galleries
- Sommerrodelbahn in Bodenwerder

== See also ==
- Weser Uplands
- List of nature parks in Germany
