= Külf =

Mountain ridge in Germany

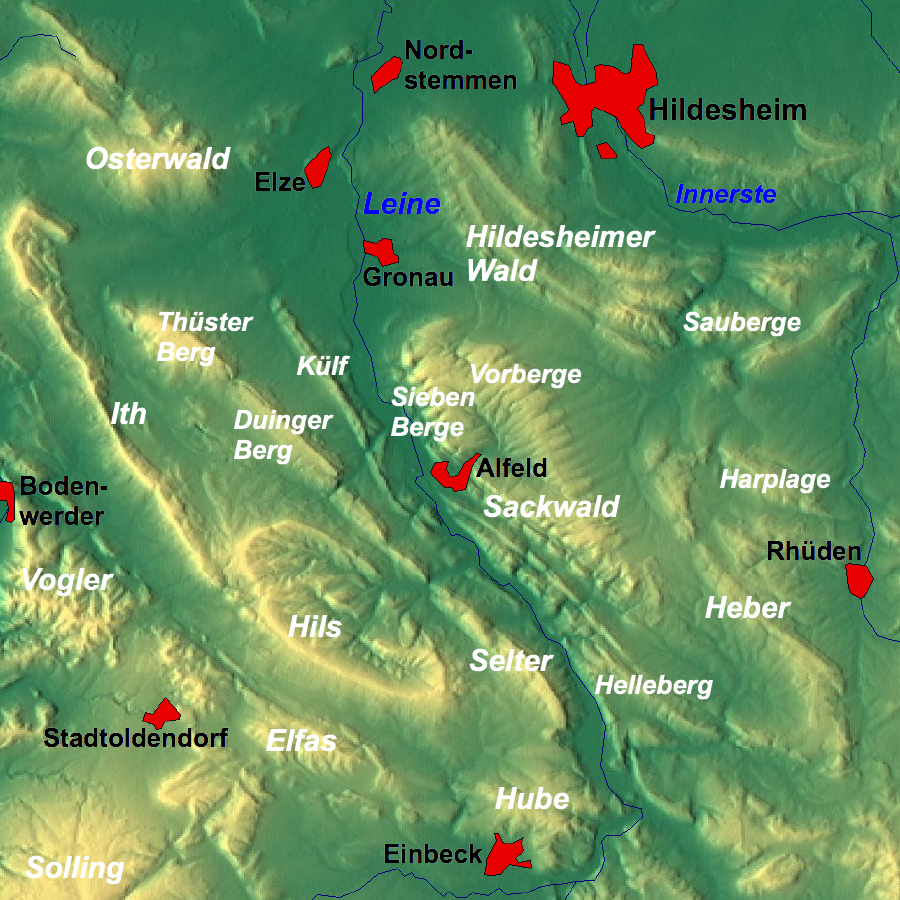
- Overview map: the Külf just above the centre

Highest point
- Peak: unnamed summit
- Elevation: 260 m above NN

Dimensions
- Length: 9 km (5.6 mi)

Geography
- Country: Germany
- State: Lower Saxony
- Range coordinates: 52°02′00″N 9°45′00″E
- Parent range: Leine Uplands

Geology
- Rock age(s): Lower muschelkalk, Bunter Sandstone
- Rock type(s): limestone, marl, sandstone

The Külf is a ridge, up to 260 m above NN, in the Leine Uplands in the district of Hildesheim in the German state of Lower Saxony.

== Location ==
With seven main summits, the Külf stretches for about 9 kilometres, lying in a triangle formed by the settlements of Gronau, Alfeld and Duingen. It is located between Eime and Banteln to the north, Dehnsen to the east, Limmer to the southeast, Brunkensen to the south and Hoyershausen, Lübbrechtsen and Deinsen to the west. West of the Külf is another ridge, the Thüster Berg, to the southwest is the Duinger Berg and to the east are the seven hills of the Sieben Berge. The B 3 federal road runs through the Leine valley from Gronau to Alfeld east of the Külf.

== Geology ==
Geologically the Külf is part of the Alfeld Saddle, to which the Rettberg and Hackeberg to the south also belong (and extending to the north from Freden). Its underlying rocks consist of limestones of the muschelkalk, hard Trochitenkalk (Upper muschelkalk) and Wellenkalk (Lower muschelkalk).

== Name ==
The name of this hill range is alluded to in almost all the settlements that border it, not least the road names Am Külf (in Dehnsen), Külftalstraße (in Hoyershausen) as well as the names of local shops, such as the Külf-Apotheke ("Külf Chemists") and Külf-Backerei ("Külf Bakery"), both in Eime.

== Cölle Tower ==
In the north of the Külf there is an observation tower, the Cölle Tower (Cölleturm), at an elevation of 234 m above NN, that has stood here since about 1835.

== Hiking in the Külf ==
The going on the various hiking trails in the Külf varies depending on the season as a result of forestry activity. Unlike the trails in the better known ridges and hills like the Sieben Berge, Solling and Hils, those of the Külf are less frequently used. The ridgeway itself is very narrow in places and has steep drops to the side. It runs from about 10 kilometres from north to south. On the eastern side there are views over the Leine valley to the Sieben Berge. To the west the view ranges over the villages of Hoyershausen, Lübbrechtsen and Deinsen. On the northern side there are hiking car parks at the entrance to Deinsen. There is a longer path through the Feldmark with a slow climb from Banteln.

== Sources ==
- Bundesanstalt für Landeskunde und Raumforschung: Geographische Landesaufnahme 1:200000. Naturräumliche Gliederung Deutschlands. Die naturräumlichen Einheiten auf Blatt 86 Hannover. Bad Godesberg 1960.
- Bundesanstalt für Landeskunde und Raumforschung: Geographische Landesaufnahme 1:200000. Naturräumliche Gliederung Deutschlands. Die naturräumlichen Einheiten auf Blatt 99 Göttingen. Bad Godesberg 1963.
