= Saale (disambiguation) =

The Saale is a river flowing through Bavaria, Thuringia and Saxony-Anhalt, a tributary of the Elbe.

Saale may also refer to:

== Rivers in Germany ==
- Franconian Saale, flowing through Bavaria, tributary of the Main
- Saale (Leine), flowing through Lower Saxony, tributary of the Leine

== Other uses ==
- SS Saale, ocean liner for North German Lloyd in the late 19th century
- Saale glaciation, glaciation in Northern Europe
