= Upper Weser Valley =

Valley in Germany

Coordinates: 51°51′N 9°28′E

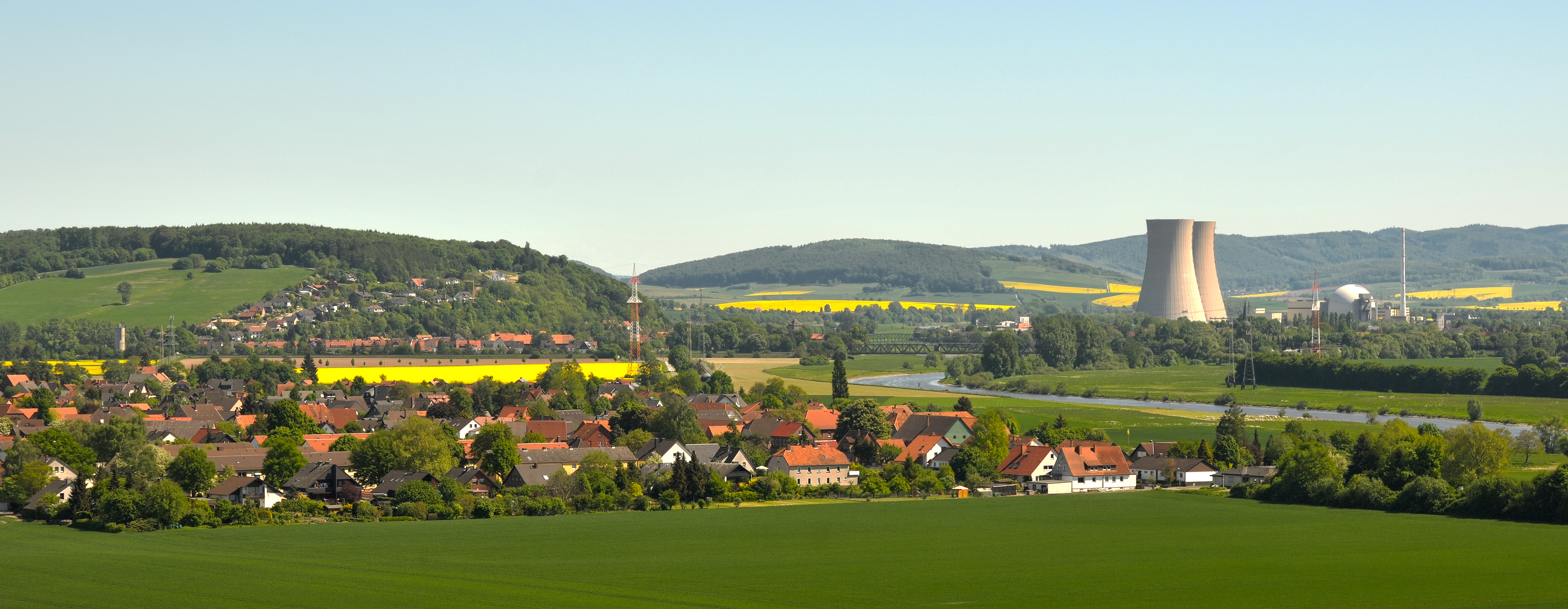
View from the Ohrbergpark to the small village Tündern and to the Grohnde Nuclear Power Plant beside the river Weser in the Upper Weser Valley and the Weser Uplands. The yellow fields are rapeseed fields.

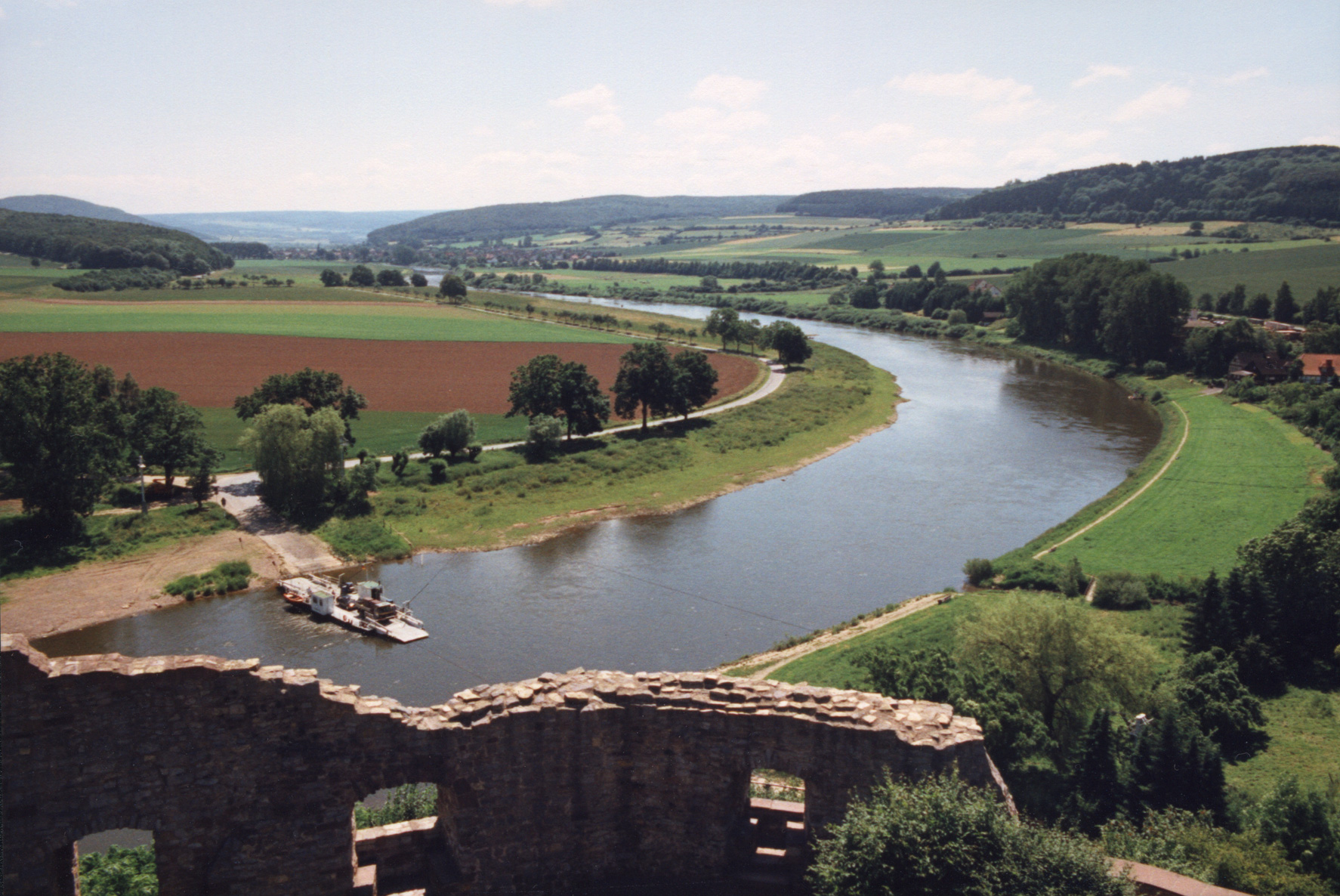
The Upper Weser Valley near Polle

The Upper Weser Valley (German: Oberes Wesertal) in central Germany has been formed by the Upper Weser river cutting through the Weser Uplands for around 200 kilometres (120 mi) between the towns of Hann. Münden and Minden. It lies in the German federal states of Lower Saxony, Hesse and North Rhine-Westphalia.

== Course ==
The Upper Weser Valley begins near Hann. Münden, where the rivers Werra and Fulda join to form the Weser and follows the course of the Upper Weser northwards through the Weser Uplands to Bodenwerder, then continues in a northwestern direction, south of the Süntel hills and the Weser Hills, and ends finally at the great gap of Porta Westfalica, where the Weser breaks through the Wiehen and Weser Hills out into the North German Plain. In the south the Upper Weser Valley crosses the Solling-Vogler Nature Park and, in the north, the Weser Uplands Schaumburg-Hamelin Nature Park.

At its northern end, the Upper Weser Valley is followed by the Middle Weser Valley, part of the Middle Weser Region.

== Hills ==
The Upper Weser Valley is bordered by the following uplands (from south to north):

Left-hand side:

- Reinhardswald
- Pyrmont Uplands
- Lippe Uplands
- Wiehen Hills

Right-hand side:

- Bramwald
- Solling
- Burgberg
- Vogler
- Ith
- Süntel
- Weser Hills

== Towns ==
The towns of the Upper Weser Valley are Hann. Münden, Bad Karlshafen, Beverungen, Höxter, Holzminden, Bodenwerder, Hameln, Rinteln, Vlotho, Bad Oeynhausen and Porta Westfalica.

== Culture and Infrastructure ==
The Upper Weser Valley has is agriculturally and culturally important.

Several tourist routes accompany the Weser Valley: The German Fairy Tale Route, the Weser Valley Road, the German Timber-Frame Road and the Road of Weser Renaissance. The valley is crossed by several railway lines at places like Hann. Münden, Wehrden (Weser), Höxter and Holzminden. From Hamelin the railway lines run parallel to the Weser via Bad Oeynhausen (Weser Railway) to Minden (Hamm–Minden railway).

A long section of the roughly 500 km long cycle path, the Weser Cycle Path runs mostly along the Weser through the Upper Weser Valley.
