= Kanstein =

Kanstein may refer to:

Hills:

- the highest hill in the Thüster Berg, Germany
- a hill in the Harz Foreland near Langelsheim, Germany

People:

- Paul Ernst Kanstein (1899–1980/81), German lawyer, Gestapo official and SS-Führer
