= Hube (hills) =

Ridge in Lower Saxony, Germany

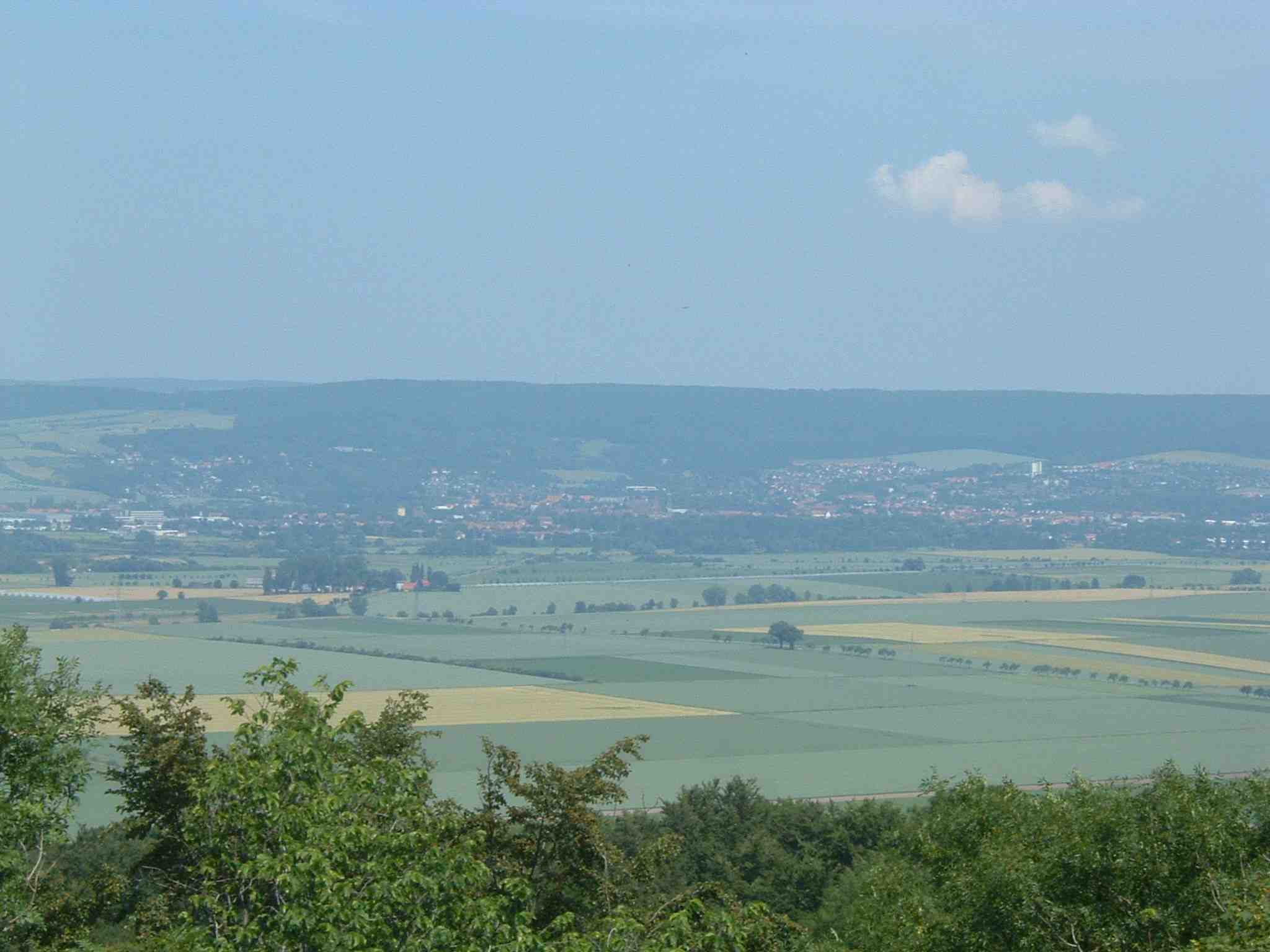
- View from Grubenhagen Castle over the Ilme valley and Einbeck to the Hube

Highest point
- Peak: Fuchshöhlenberg
- Elevation: 346.2 m above NN
- Coordinates: 51°50′30″N 9°54′30″E

Geography
- Location within Lower Saxony
- Location: Near Einbeck; Northeim, Lower Saxony Germany
- Parent range: Southwest Harz Foreland in the Weser-Leine Uplands

The Hube is a ridge, up to 346.2 m above sea level (NN), in the Leine Uplands and district of Northeim, in the German state of Lower Saxony.

== Geography ==
The densely wooded Hube lies immediately northeast of the town of Einbeck, with its pretty, timber-framed houses, west of the River Leine and north of the Ilme valley. Although the ridge, which measures some 8.5 × 5.5 kilometres, is west of the Leine it is counted as part of the southwestern Harz Foreland in Germany's official natural regional classification.

The highest elevation on the Hube is the Fuchshöhlenberg with its transmission mast at 346.2 m. About 150 metres southeast of the tower is the highest point of the actual summit. On the northern edge of the Greene Forest, the northern part of the Hube, are the ruins of Greene Castle above the town of Greene with good views from the castle tower. In the southern part of the Hube, 570 metres north of the Altendorfer Berg and between Einbeck and Negenborn stands the Emperor Frederick Tower (Kaiser-Friedrick-Turm), also called the Einbeck Tower (Einbecker Turm).

== Geology ==
In the Hube region, carbonate rocks predominate. Upper and Middle Muschelkalk occur on its western rim, Lower Muschelkalk in the central area and Bunter Sandstone on its eastern slopes.

== Hills ==
The hills of the Hube, including its foothills, are (sorted by height in metres above sea level (NN):

- Fuchshöhlenberg (346.2 m)
- Kalkrosenberg (336.0 m)
- Greener Berg (334.0 m)
- Burgberg (ca. 325 m)
- Einbecker Berg (308.1 m)
- Breitenberg (305.2 m)
- Eschenberg (304.0 m)
- Lietberg (287.7 m)
- Spillenberg (272.2 m)
- Altendorfer Berg (270.8 m)
- Tauberg (ca. 270 m)
- Röhrenberg (265.8 m)
- Luhberg (210.2 m)
- Knollenberg (202.3 m)
- Oberg (201.4 m)

== Settlements ==
Settlements around the Hube whose built-up areas impinge significantly on the ridge are (sorted alphabetically):

- Andershausen
- Brunsen
- Einbeck
- Garlebsen
- Greene
- Holtershausen
- Ippensen
- Kreiensen
- Kuventhal
- Negenborn (with its holiday village)
- Salzderhelden
- Volksen

== Sources ==
- Fr. Knoll: Topographie des Herzogtums Braunschweig. Verlag Wollermann 1897
- Bundesanstalt für Landeskunde und Raumforschung: Geographische Landesaufnahme 1:200000. Naturräumliche Gliederung Deutschlands. Die naturräumlichen Einheiten auf Blatt 99 Göttingen. Bad Godesberg 1963
