= Weser Uplands =

Hill region in Germany

Coordinates: 51°58′N 9°30′E

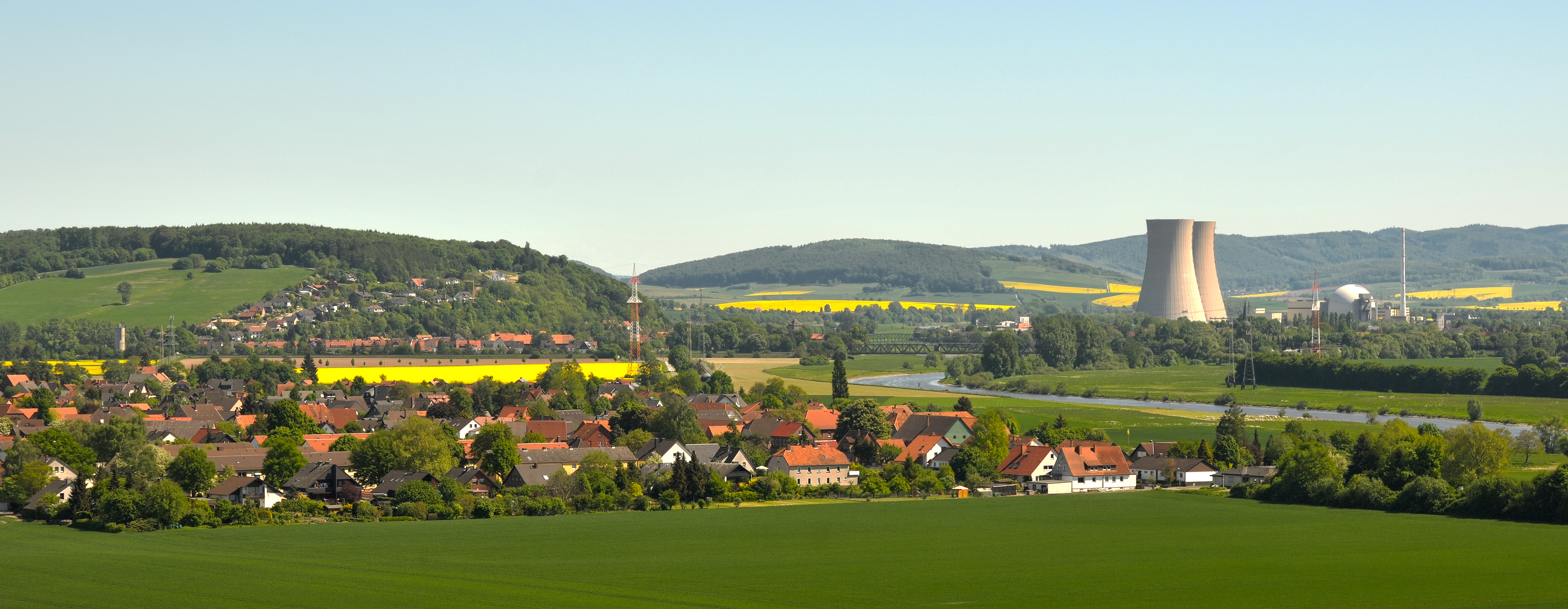
View from Ohrberg Park to the small village of Tündern and Grohnde Nuclear Power Plant, next to the River Weser in the Upper Weser Valley and the Weser Uplands. The yellow fields are rapeseed.

The Weser Uplands (German: Weserbergland, German pronunciation: [ˈveːzɐˌbɛʁklant]) is a hill region in Germany, between Hannoversch Münden and Porta Westfalica, along the river Weser. The area reaches into three states, Lower Saxony, Hesse, and North Rhine-Westphalia. Important towns of this region include Bad Karlshafen, Holzminden, Höxter, Bodenwerder, Hameln, Rinteln, and Vlotho.

The tales of the Brothers Grimm are set in the Weser Uplands, and it has many renaissance buildings, exhibiting a peculiar regional style, the Weser Renaissance style. The region roughly coincides with the natural region of the Lower Saxon Hills defined by the Federal Agency for Nature Conservation (BfN).

== Geography ==
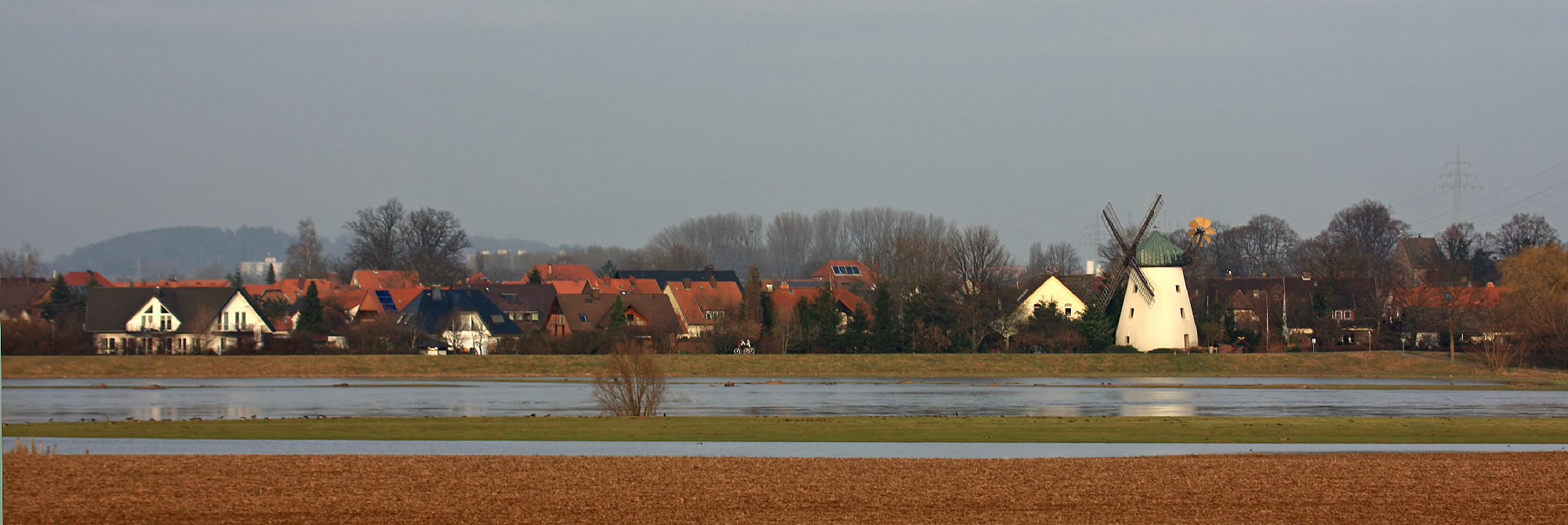
The Weser. Behind: Tündern

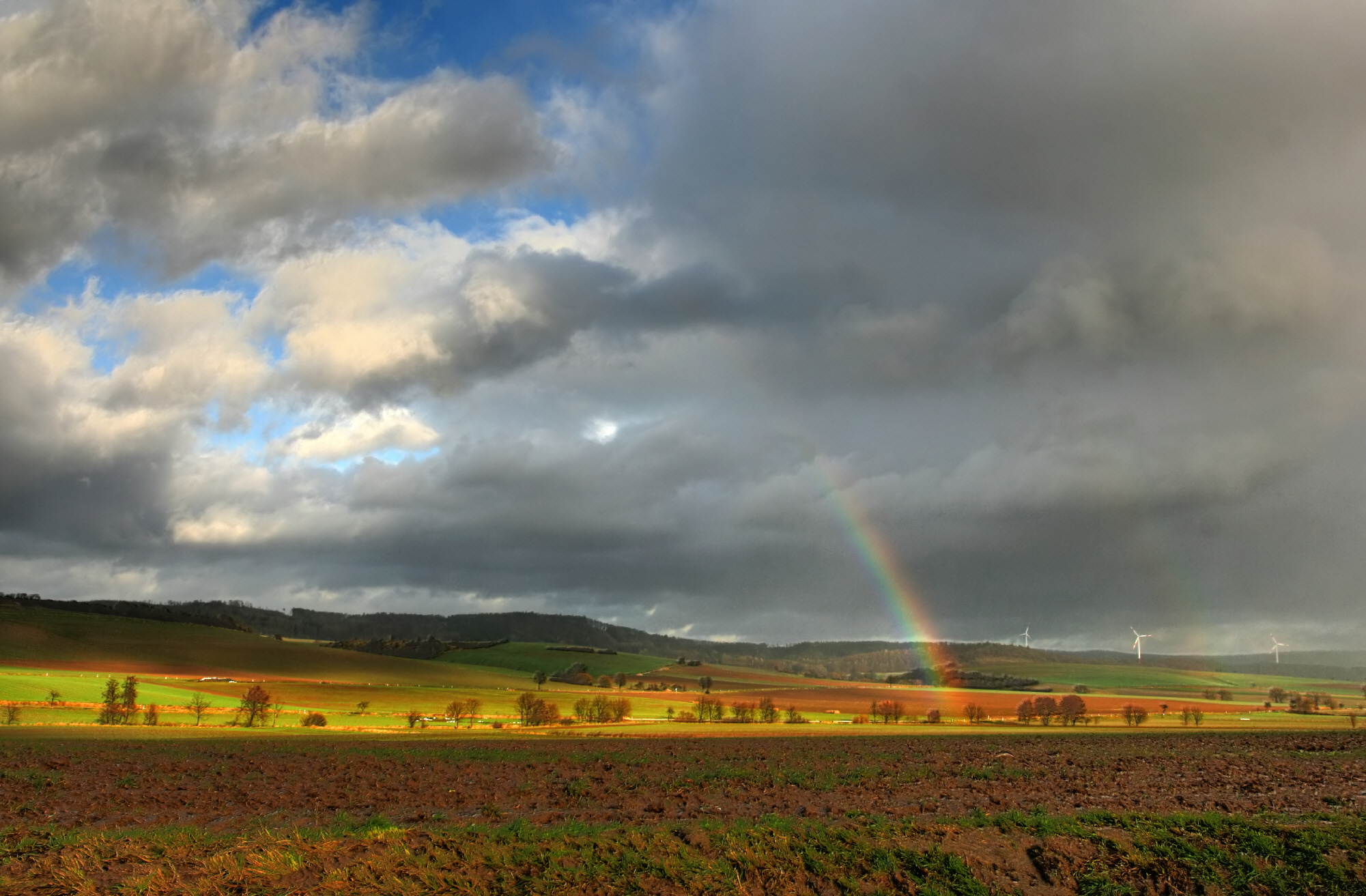
The Weser Uplands

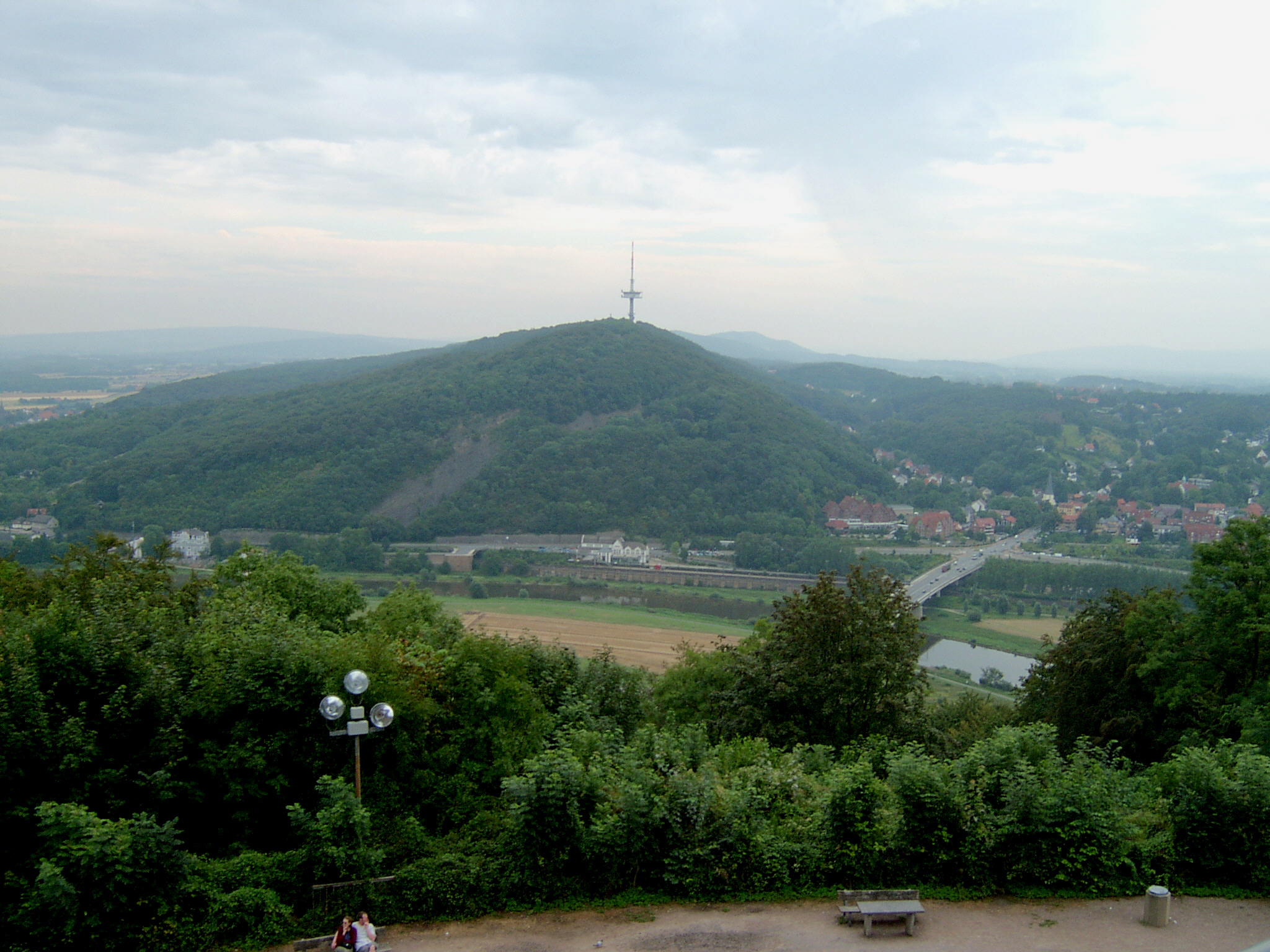
View of the Weser Hills. The hill with the TV tower is the Jakobsberg.

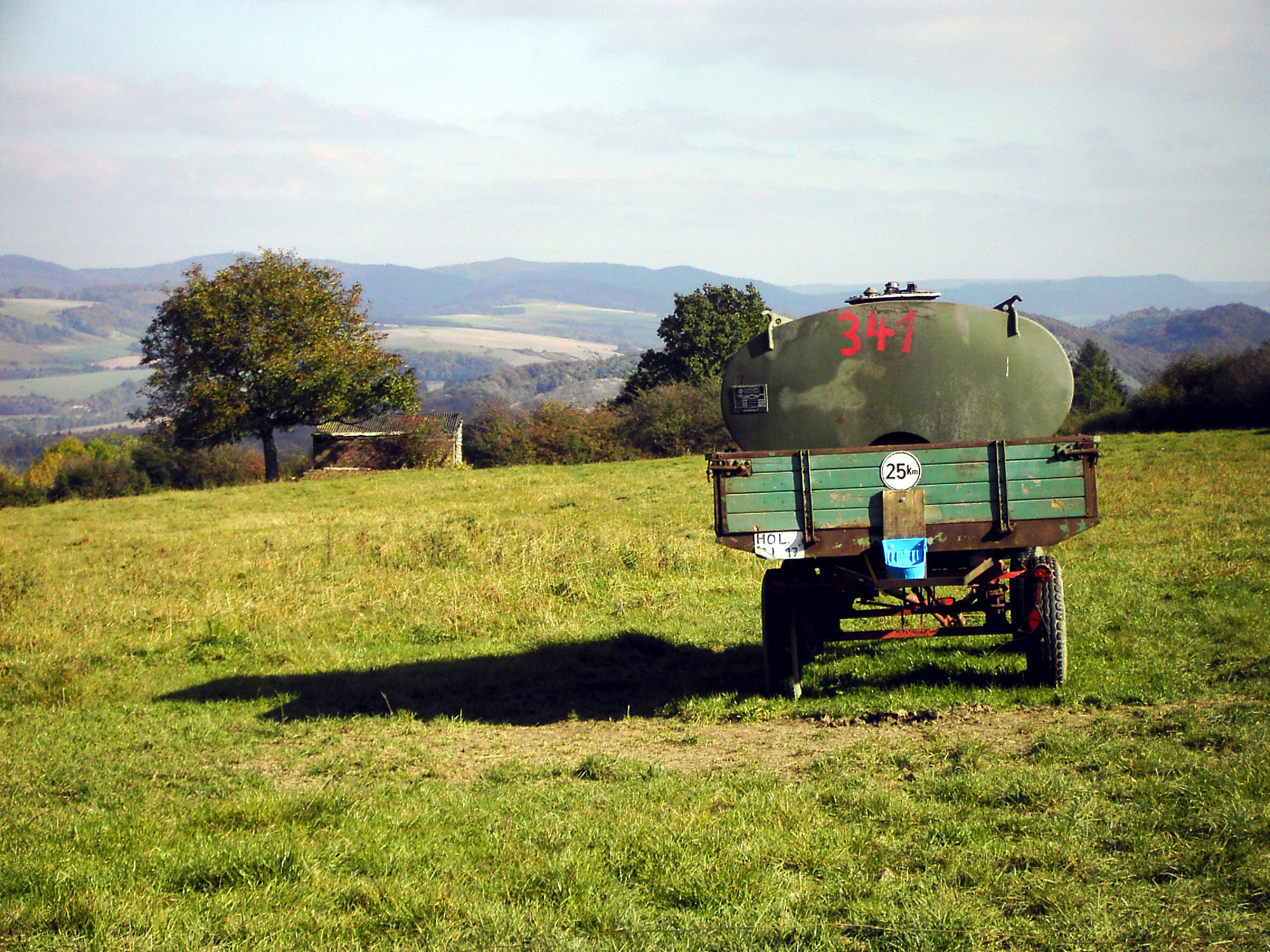
Weser Uplands between Heinsen and Polle

In addition to the whole of the Weser Valley between Hann. Münden und Porta Westfalica, several geologically associated, but clearly separate chains of uplands, ridges and individual hills are considered part of the Weser Uplands. In its narrowest sense, the following would be included (running from north to south):

Name	Height above NN
Weser Hills	326.1 m
Süntel	440 m
Ottenstein Plateau	376 m
Vogler	460.4 m
Burgberg	357.5 m
Solling	527.8 m
Reinhardswald	472.2 m
Bramwald	408 m

The largest contiguous area of forest in the Weser Uplands lies on the Solling in the Solling-Vogler Nature Park. Its woods stretch southwards as far as the Reinardswald (on left bank of the Weser) and Bramwald (right bank), interrupted only by the island-like Uslar Basin and the narrow Weser valley. Even on the far side of the rivers Fulda and Werra - and thus beyond the Weser Uplands - the dense forest continues further south without significant interruption to the Kaufungen Forest.

=== Notable ridges ===
In addition to the aforementioned core ridges, other ranges and ridges are also sometimes considered part of the Weser Uplands. These mainly include the following (with maximum elevations given in metres above sea level (NN):

- Ahlsburg (411.4 m)
- Amtsberge (392.2 m)
- Bückeberg (367 m)
- Burgberg (355.0 m)
- Deister (405.0 m)
- Elfas (409.6 m)
- Hils (480.4 m)
- Holzberg (444.5 m)
- Homburg Forest (406.1 m)
- Ith (439 m)
- Kleiner Deister (345.7 m)
- Lippe Uplands (495.8 m)
- Nesselberg (378.2 m)
- Oberwälder Land
- Osterwald (419.2 m)
- Weper (379 m)
- (Eastern) Wiehen Hills (319.6 m)

The last major changes to the landscape were made during the course of the ice ages by the glacial advances of the Scandinavian ice sheet which gave rise to much of Germany's present-day Northern Lowland.

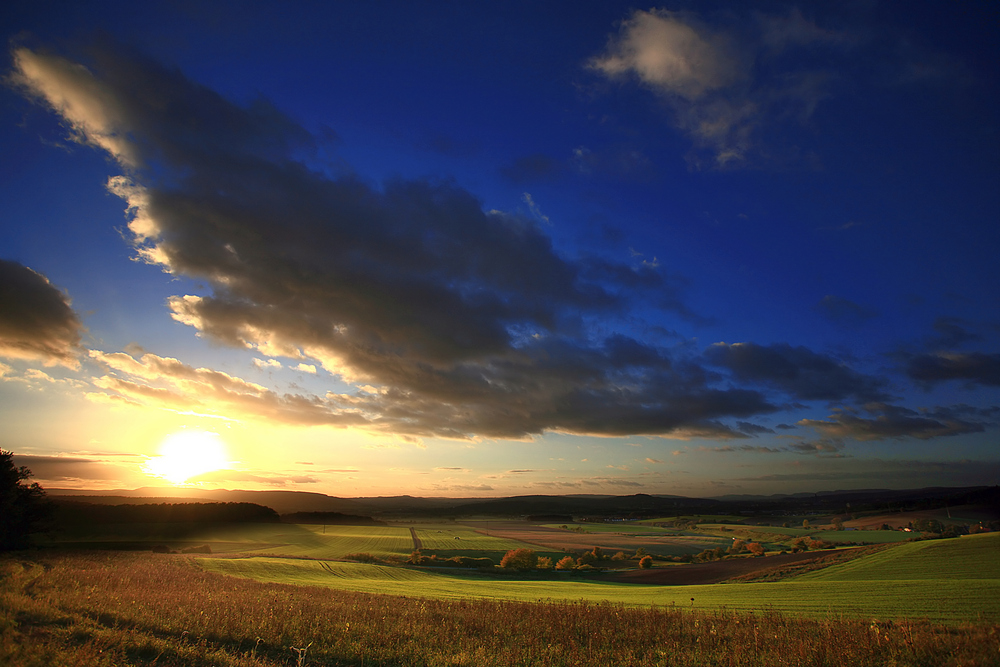
Sunset in the Weser Uplands

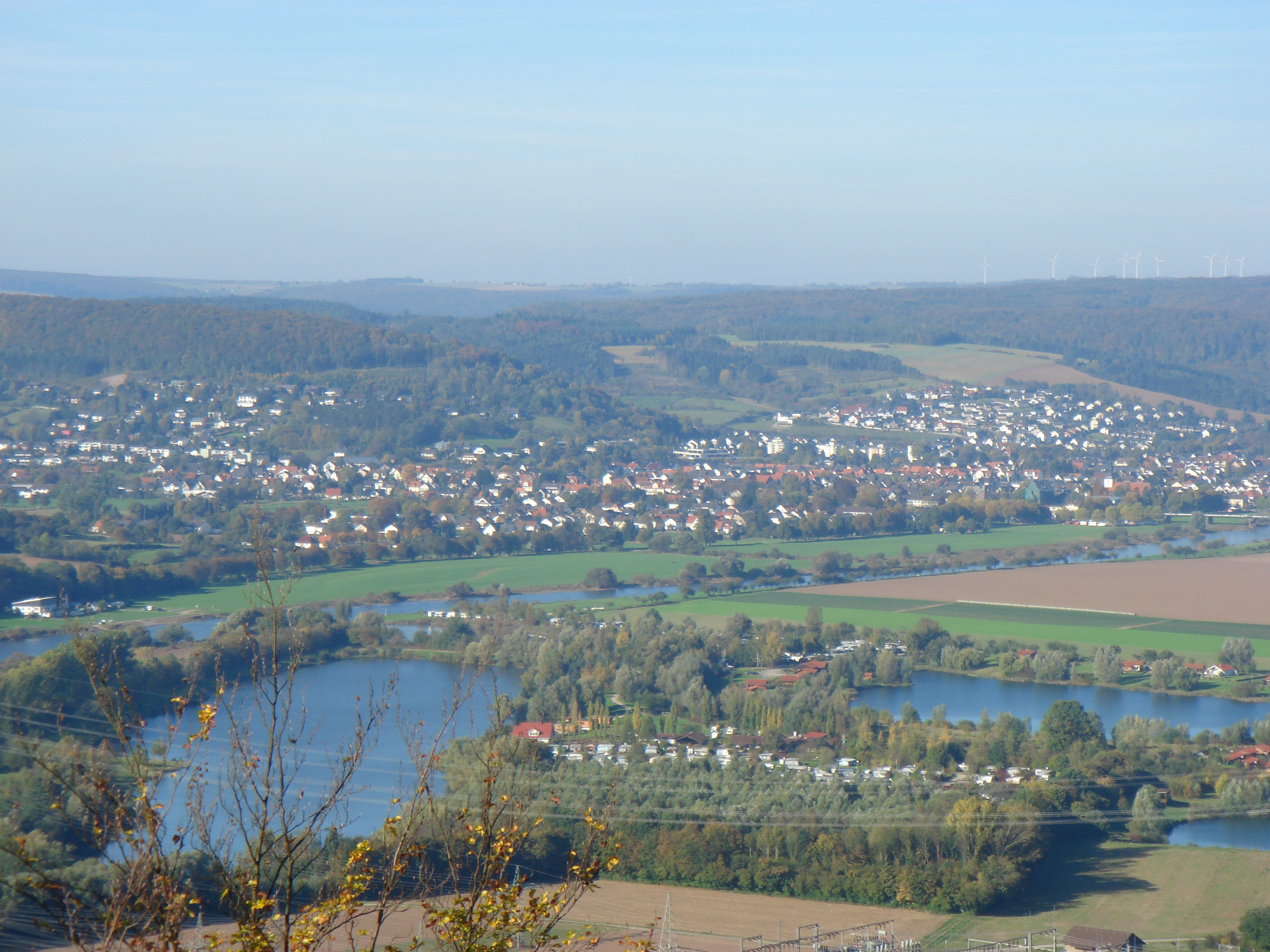
Weser Uplands, view of Beverungen looking north

== Important towns ==
- Bad Karlshafen
- Bad Münder am Deister
- Bad Nenndorf
- Bad Oeynhausen
- Bad Pyrmont
- Bad Salzuflen
- Bevern
- Beverungen
- Bodenwerder
- Dassel
- Emmerthal
- Eschershausen
- Hameln
- Hann. Münden
- Hessisch Oldendorf
- Höxter
- Holzminden
- Lemgo
- Minden
- Porta Westfalica
- Rinteln
- Salzhemmendorf
- Uslar
- Vlotho

== Culture ==
The Weser Uplands once developed its own style of architecture. Between 1520 and 1640 a great number of buildings were built in the so-called Weser Renaissance style.

Characters from the area who have achieved international renown include the legendary Pied Piper of Hamelin, the Lying Baron, Baron Munchausen, whose real-life inspiration came from Bodenwerder, and Doctor Eisenbarth who died in Hann. Münden.

In addition, many fairy tales by the Brothers Grimm were set in the region, for example, Snow White, which is supposed to have taken place in Alfeld, Rapunzel, who let down her long hair for her prince from a tower at Trendelburg Castle, or Sleeping Beauty, whose castle was based on the now ruined Sababurg near Hofgeismar.

== Artistic reception ==
The picturesque landscape of the Weser Uplands has inspired many landscape painters and artists: Jacob Pins (1917–2005), Robert Batty, Christian Andreas Besemann, Carl Ferdinand Fabritius, Robert Geißler, Wolfgang Heinrich, Karl Arthur Held, Alfred Hesse, Rudolf Jahns, Herbert Mager, Anton Wilhelm Strack (1758–1829), Pascha Johann Friedrich Weitsch and August Wenderoth.

== Tourism ==
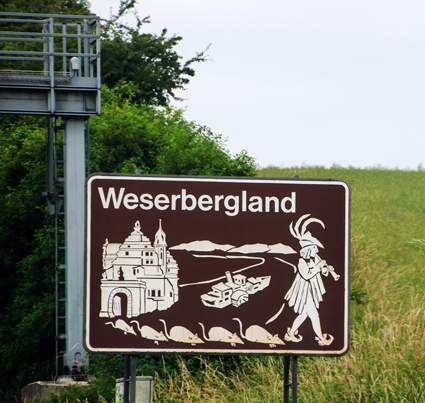
Tourist sign by the A 2 motorway in the Weser Hills

The more significant tourist destinations in the region, in addition to the historic towns mentioned above are the Weser Uplands Schaumburg-Hamelin Nature Park, the Solling-Vogler Nature Park, the roughly 500 kilometre long-distance cycle path, the Weser Cycleway along the River Weser. A botanic feature are the rare dwarf beech trees (Süntelbuchen).

Of increasing importance is motorcycle tourism. The Weser Uplands, like the Harz, is a popular motorcycle destination in northern Germany. In particular, the Köterberg, as the highest elevation from that point to the North Sea, is a popular motorcycle meeting point with a magnificent panoramic view up to 80 kilometres.

Other notable attractions are the Schillat Cave, the Tonenburg in Höxter-Albaxen, the Neuhaus Wildlife Park, the Weserstein in Hann. Münden and several museums such as the Agricultural Technology Museum in Börry, the hammer mill in Dassel, The German Huguenot Museum in Bad Karlshafen and the Motorcycle Museum in Wickensen.

== Economy ==
The region is heavily influenced by tourism. Large areas are also utilized by agriculture and forestry and firms involved in processing the products of these industries, such as sawmills. A porcelain factory in Fürstenberg has been working since 1747.
