= Calenberg Uplands =

Landscape unit in Lower Saxony, Germany

Coordinates: 52°15′N 9°19′E

The Calenberg Uplands (German: Calenberger Bergland) are a landscape unit in the Weser-Leine Uplands in Lower Saxony, Germany. They border on the Calenberg Land to the north and merge into the Weser Uplands in the west and the Leine Uplands in the east. They are dissected by the Deister-Süntel and Aue valleys.

The following ridges belong to the Calenberg Uplands:

- Bückeberg – 367 m above sea level (NN)
- Deister – 405 m above NN
- Harrl – 211 m above NN
- Kleiner Deister (L) – 346 m above NN
- Nesselberg (L) – 378 m above NN
- Osterwald (L) – 419 m above NN
- Süntel (W) – 437 m above NN
- Wesergebirge (W) – 340 m above NN

Whilst the southwestern ridges of the Süntel and Weser Hills also belong to the Weser Uplands (W), the eastern heights of the Osterwald, Nesselberg and Kleiner Deister are grouped with the Leine Uplands (L).
