= Pyrmont Uplands =

Coordinates: 51°57′N 9°24′E

The Pyrmont Uplands (German: Pyrmonter Bergland) are a muschelkalk region within the Lower Saxon Hills and covers an area of 180 km^{2}. Their maximum elevation is about 350 metres above sea level (NN). The valley of the Emmer divides the uplands into the Ottenstein Plateau in the east and Pyrmont Heights (Pyrmonter Höhen) in the west. In these muschelkalk hills lies the Pyrmont Basin (Pyrmonter Talkessel) on the fault lines of which mineral and brine springs rise, and to which the town of Bad Pyrmont owes its status as a spa town.

The Ottenstein Plateau is used for agriculture. On the hill of Pyrmonter Berg is the only large area of deciduous forest. In spite of its poor soils, agriculture dominates: grasslands follow the rivers in the valleys. Forestry is carried out on the Pyrmont Heights.

The valley of the Emmer stream has been declared as a Special Area of Conservation; part of it also has nature reserve status.
