= Saale (Leine) =

River in Lower Saxony, Germany

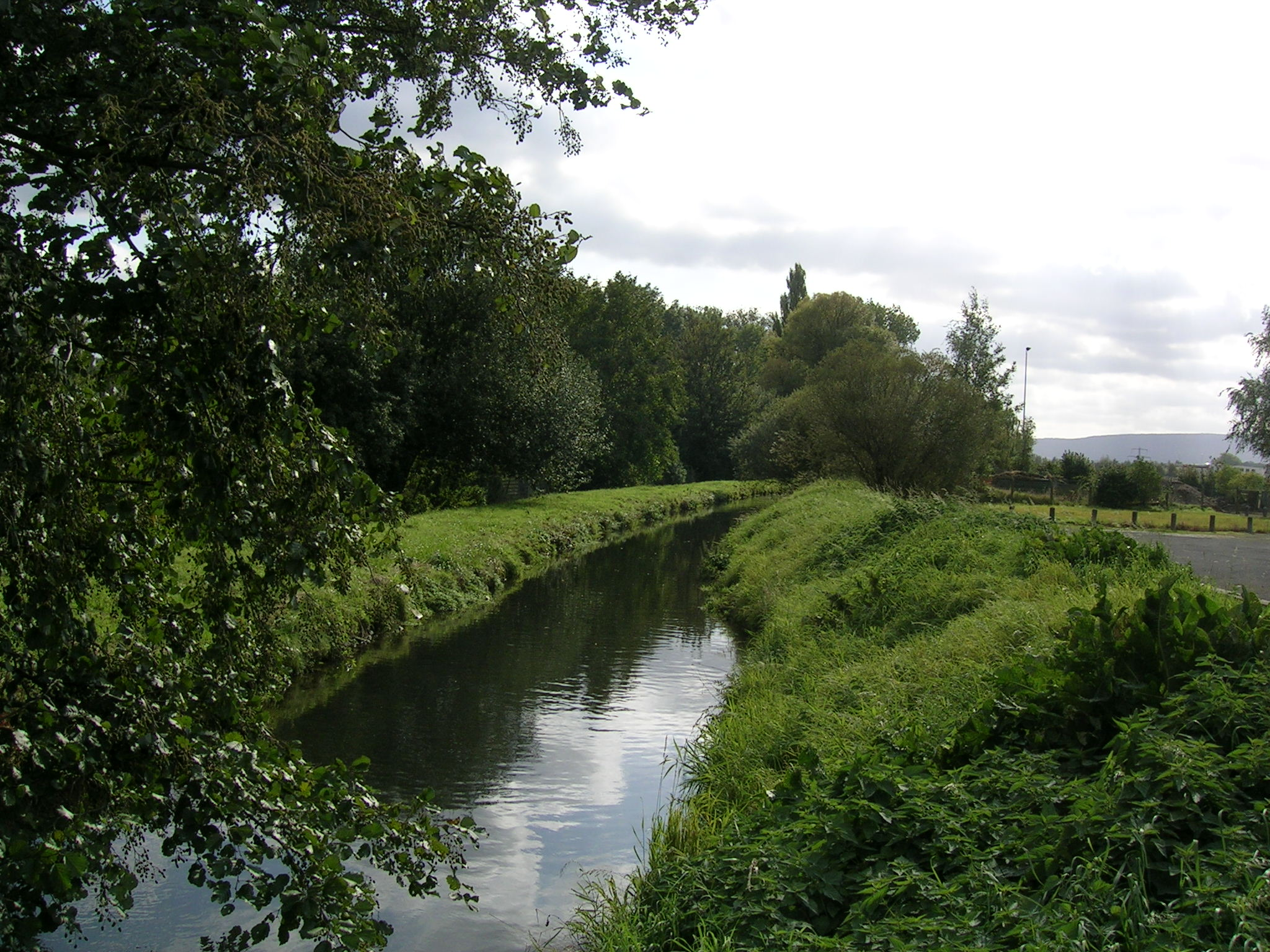

Location
- Country: Germany
- State: Lower Saxony

Physical characteristics
- Mouth
  - location: Leine
  - coordinates: 52°07′56″N 9°45′13″E
- Length: 30.2 km (18.8 mi)

Basin features
- Progression: Leine→ Aller→ Weser→ North Sea

Saale is a river of Lower Saxony, Germany. It is a left tributary of the Leine. Its source is near the village Duingen. It flows into the Leine in Elze.

== See also ==
- List of rivers of Lower Saxony
