= Holzen =

- Municipality
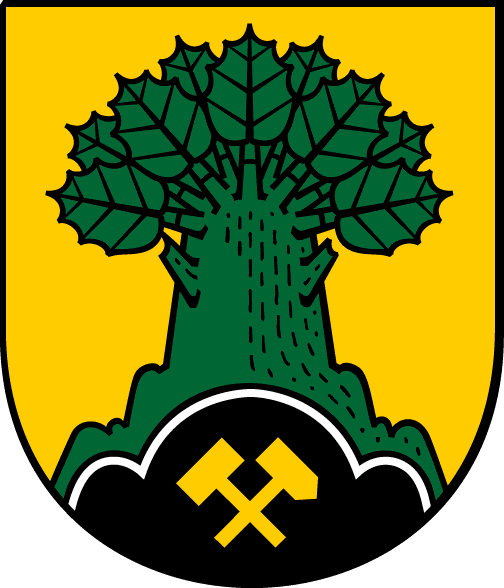
- Flag Coat of arms

- Location of Holzen within Holzminden district
- Interactive map of Holzen
- Location within Germany Location within Lower Saxony
- Coordinates: 51°56′N 9°40′E
- Country: Germany
- State: Lower Saxony
- District: Holzminden
- Municipal assoc.: Eschershausen-Stadtoldendorf

Government
  - Mayor: Helmut Alms (SPD)

Area
  - Total: 7 km^{2} (2.7 sq mi)
- Elevation: 190 m (620 ft)

Population (2025-12-31)
  - Total: 475
  - Density: 68/km^{2} (180/sq mi)
- Time zone: UTC+01:00 (CET)
  - Summer (DST): UTC+02:00 (CEST)
- Postal codes: 37632
- Dialling codes: 05534
- Vehicle registration: HOL
- Website: www.holzen.info

Holzen is a municipality in the district of Holzminden, in Lower Saxony, Germany.
