= Hils =

Hill range in Germany

Coordinates: 51°56′N 9°45′E

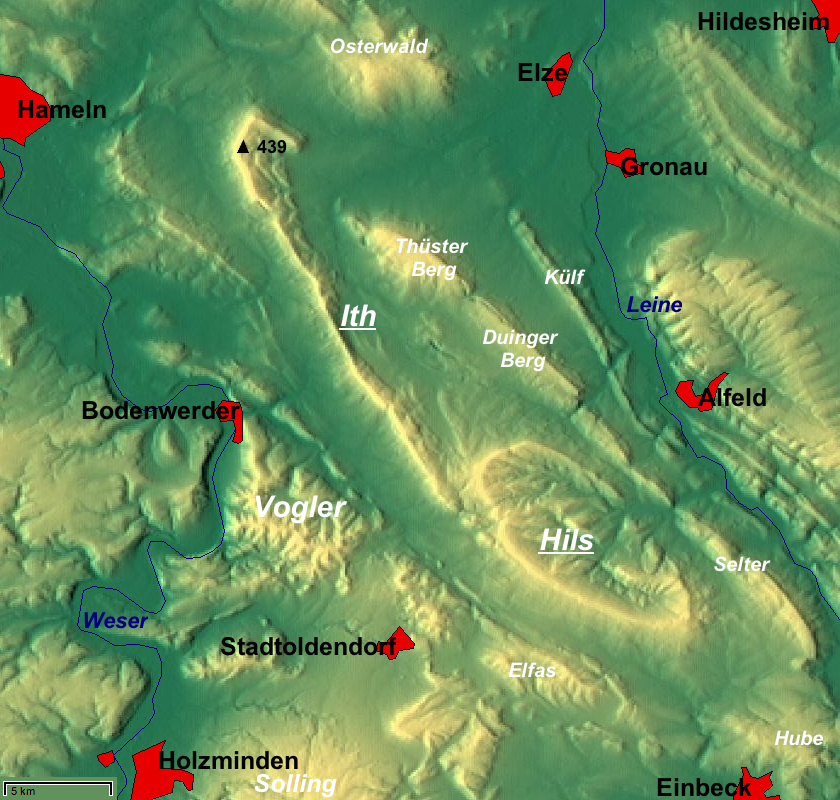
Overview map: the Ith and Hils are in the centre

The Hils is a range of hills in Germany's Central Uplands that is up to 480.4 m high. It is located in the districts of Holzminden, Hildesheim and Northeim, in the state of Lower Saxony.

== Geography ==
The heavily forested massif of the Hils, which is part of the Leine Uplands and Weser-Leine Uplands, is immediately southeast of the knife edge ridge known as the Ith. It is located roughly northwest of Einbeck between Holzen to the west and Delligsen to the east.

The highest elevation in the Hils is the 480.4 m high Bloße Zelle, the second highest the nearby Großer Sohl (472 m), on which a monument to the poet, Wilhelm Raabe, has been erected next to the Wilhelm Raabe Tower named after him.

Numerous walking trails run through the Hils, which is accessible from the B 3, B 64 and B 240 federal highways.

== Towns and villages in and around the Hils ==
The towns and villages which lie immediately in and around the Hils are:

Coppengrave, Delligsen, Duingen, Eschershausen, Fölziehausen, Grünenplan, Hohenbüchen, Hohe Warte, Holzen, Kaierde, Varrigsen.
