= Ottenstein Plateau =

Coordinates: 51°57′N 9°24′E

The Ottenstein Plateau (German: Ottensteiner Hochebene or Ottensteiner Hochfläche) is part of the Lower Saxon Weser Uplands and lies between Bodenwerder and Bad Pyrmont.

Compared with the surrounding area of the Weser and Emmer valleys, the plateau is a largely open plain, about 200 m higher, and which lies between 250 and 350 metres above sea level. Its highest elevation is 376 m above sea level (NN) and lies not far from the village of Eichenborn.

Agriculture and wind power characterise the landscape. In the centre is the small town of Ottenstein. Other villages are Kleinenberg, Großenberg, Eichenborn, Baarsen and Neersend in the borough of Bad Pyrmont, Lüntorf in the borough of Emmerthal, Lichtenhagen in the borough of Ottenstein and Vahlbruch. The Ottenstein Plateau lies near the tourist attractions of the Köterberg and the so-called Rühle Switzerland (Rühler Schweiz).

At the beginning of 2004 twelve villages started the AEP (Agricultural Development Planning) of the Ottenstein Plateau. Since 2005 a rapeseed flower queen has been chosen at the annual rapeseed flower festival; she then represents the region.
