= Leine Uplands =

Region in Germany's Central Uplands

Coordinates: 51°58′0″N 9°49′0″E

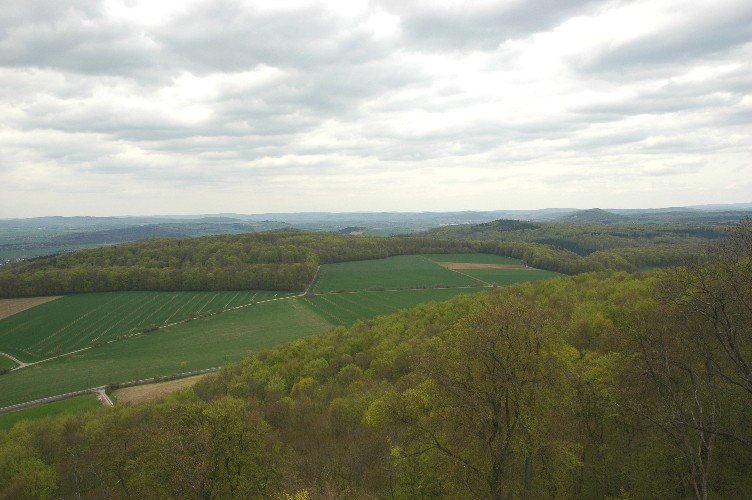
View over the Leine Uplands north of Göttingen

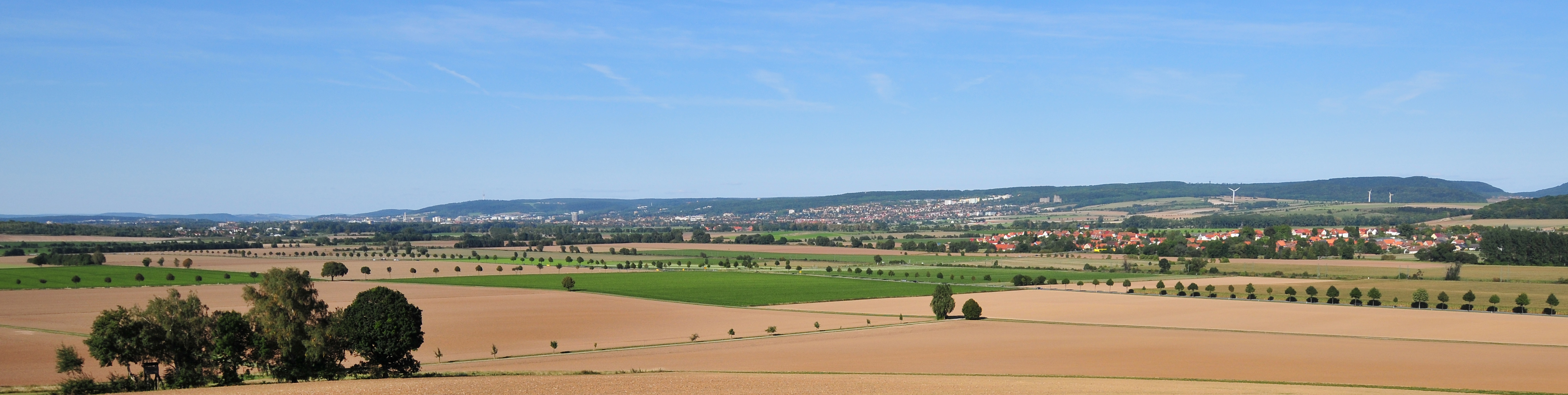
The Leine trough between Göttingen and Niedernjesa with the Leine Uplands.

The Leine Uplands (German: Leinebergland, German pronunciation) is a region in Germany's Central Uplands which forms a part of the Lower Saxon Hills and lies along the River Leine between Göttingen and Hanover. It borders on the Weser Uplands in the west, the Innerste Uplands in the northeast, the Harz in the east and Untereichsfeld in the southeast.

== Geography ==
The Leine Uplands, which merge into the Weser Uplands to the east and the Harz to the west, are not a clearly defined landscape in terms of being a natural region but are nevertheless relatively easily delineated. Their extent from south to north is determined by the river that lends them their name and their extent from east to west by high ridges.

From north to south the uplands can be broadly divided into a southern half around the wide trough of the River Leine's middle course and a northern half by the lower reaches of the same river.

=== Landscapes either side of the Leine trough ===
The River Leine flows from Friedland via Göttingen and Northeim to Einbeck through the Leine trough (Leine-Ilm Basin), an important north–south orientated geological rift valley. On the hilltops along the valley of the Leine there are many castles that controlled the north–south road network in the valley during the Middle Ages and could also block it entirely.

In the southeastern part of the Leine Uplands, east of the valley, is the plateau of the Göttingen-Northeim Forest which is founded on Bunter sandstone and Muschelkalk. The western edge of the forest (in a northerly direction) reaches from Friedland via Göttingen and Nörten-Hardenberg to Northeim. It is here that the largest group of abris in central Europe may be found. They are often located in the narrowest places in the ravine-like rocky valleys between the Leine and the Eichsfeld. In an area about 30 km long and 6 to 10 km wide around 1600 abris have been discovered. The woods (largely beech forests) are utilised by the forestry industry.

To the north this landscape transitions into the equally thickly wooded escarpments and fault-block landscape of the Southwest Harz Foreland, in which Jurassic limestone is found alongside Bunter and Muschelkalk. Immediately north of Einbeck the Hube, an outlier of the Southwest Harz Foreland, reaches the western side of the Leine and "blocks" the Leine trough to the north.

West of the trough is the heath landscape of the latter opposite the intensively farmed Solling Foreland.

Not counted as part of the Leine Uplands is the extreme east of the Southwest Harz Foreland and the extreme northwest of the Solling Foreland around the Vogler.

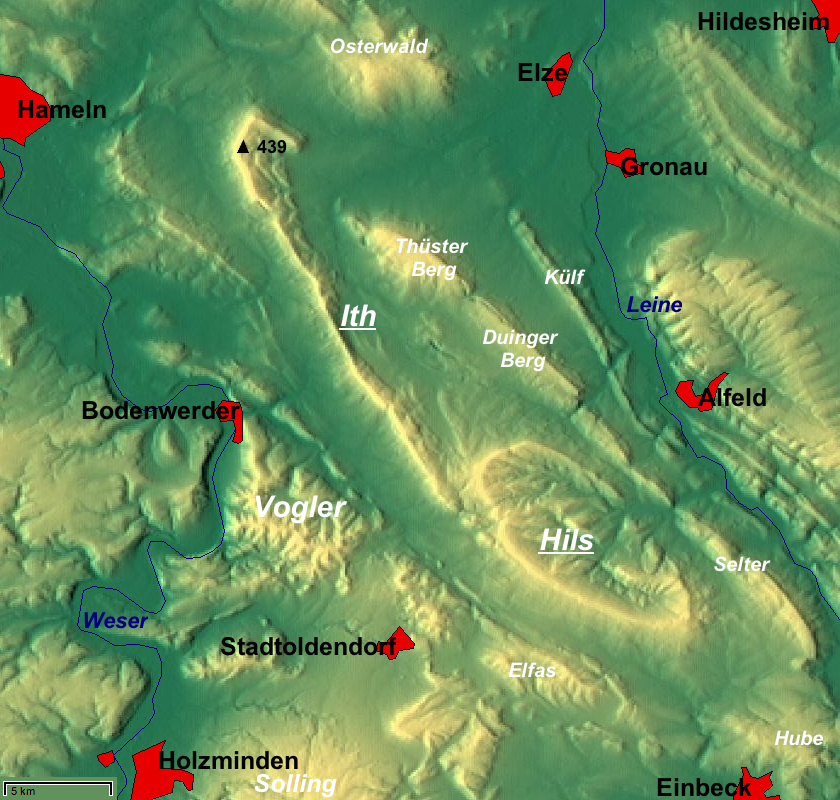
Overview map: The Leine at its exit from the Alfeld Uplands into the Calenberg Loess Börde

=== Alfeld Uplands ===
After the Leine trough has been blocked and flows around the Hube, it runs through the Alfeld Uplands (Alfelder Bergland), also called the Ith-Hils Upland (Ith-Hils-Bergland), which is characterised by a succession of closely spaced ridges and finger valleys running in a northwest–southeast direction.

East of the massifs that give the region its alternative name, the Ith and the Hils, which are up to 480 m high, the ridges fall steeply on both sides of the Leine into the valley and are dissected by various tributaries. Beech woods dominate the heights whilst the valleys are used for arable farming.

Large areas of the countryside are protected. On the ridges east of the Leine, besides the mesophilic beech and ravine woods, there are xeric grasslands, dry bushlands, mesophilic grasslands and dry chalk hillside forests that are particularly worthy of conservation.

Near Gronau the Leine finally leaves the Leine Uplands and, simultaneously, the Central Uplands and enters funnel-shaped basin of the Calenberg Loess Börde which opens out into the North German Plain and which abuts on the Calenberg Uplands in the west and the Innerste Uplands and Hildesheim Forest in the east.

=== Natural regions ===
The landscape regions of the Leine Uplands are grouped into the following major units, whereby the numbers not prefixed by the letter D represent the old categorisation into major unit groups (double figures) and major units (triple figures), whilst the new major unit group, D 36, contains the two older groups.

- D 36 Lower Saxon Hills
  - 37 Weser-Leine Uplands
    - 377 Alfeld Uplands (Ith-Hils ridges)
    - 371 Solling Foreland (less the extreme northwest which is part of the Vogler)
    - 372 Leine-Ilme Basin
    - 376 Southwest Harz Foreland (less the extreme east)
    - 373 Göttingen-Northeim Forest

=== Hills ===
The following hills are counted as part of the Leine Uplands (roughly north to south):

Name	Height above NN	Landscape region
Kleiner Deister	345,7 m	Calenberg Uplands (l)
Nesselberg	378,2 m	Calenberg Uplands (l)
Osterwald	419,2 m	Calenberg Uplands (l)
Ith	439 m	Alfeld Uplands (l)
Thüster Berg	441 m	Alfeld Uplands (l)
Külf	260 m	Alfeld Uplands (l)
Sieben Berge	395 m	Alfeld Uplands (r)
Vorberge	353,0 m	Alfeld Uplands (r)
Duinger Berg	330 m	Alfeld Uplands (l)
Sackwald	374 m	Alfeld Uplands (r)
Hils	480,4 m	Alfeld Uplands (l)
Selter	395,0 m	Alfeld Uplands (l)
Helleberg	297,5 m	Alfeld Uplands (r)
Elfas	409,6 m	Solling Foreland (l)
Hube	346,2 m	Southwest Harz Foreland (l)
Heber	317,6 m	Innerste Uplands (r)
Ahlsburg	411,4 m	Solling Foreland (l)
Amtsberge	392,2 m	Solling Foreland (l)
Holzberg	444,5 m	Solling Foreland (l)
Weper	379 m	Solling Foreland (l)
Imbshausen Forest	323,3 m	(r)
Edesheim Forest	270 m	(r)
Wieter	358,4 m	Göttingen-Northeim Forest (r)
Göttingen Forest	427,5 m	Göttingen-Northeim Forest (r)

== Towns ==
Towns in the Leine valley (from north to south): Elze; Gronau (Leine); Alfeld (Leine); Einbeck; Northeim; Göttingen	other towns in the Leine Uplands: Bad Gandersheim; Moringen; Hardegsen

== Literature ==
- Horst Vesterling: Das Leinebergland. Landschaft – Kultur – Freizeit. PDV-Sachbuchverlag, Hannover 1986. ISBN 3-925490-02-7.
- Gerhard Kraus: Rund um die sieben Berge. Ein historischer Freizeitführer durch das Leinebergland. Harenberg, Hannover 1983. ISBN 3-89042-007-9.
- Heinz Jordan: Geologische Wanderkarte Leinebergland. Maßstab 1:100.000. 1. Auflage. Verkehrsverein Leinebergland, Niedersächsisches Landesamt für Bodenforschung (Hrsg.), Hannover 1979.
- Verkehrsverein Leinebergland (Hrsg.): Leinebergland. Geschichte, Landschaft, Freizeit. Verkehrsverein Leinebergland, Alfeld (Leine) 1976.
- Arthur Rühl: Das südliche Leinebergland. Eine forstlich-vegetationskundliche und pflanzengeographische Studie. Pflanzensoziologie Band 9. Verlag G. Fischer, Jena 1954.
- Bundesanstalt für Landeskunde und Raumforschung: Geographische Landesaufnahme 1:200000. Naturräumliche Gliederung Deutschlands. Die naturräumlichen Einheiten auf Blatt 86 Hannover. Bad Godesberg 1960
- Bundesanstalt für Landeskunde und Raumforschung: Geographische Landesaufnahme 1:200000. Naturräumliche Gliederung Deutschlands. Die naturräumlichen Einheiten auf Blatt 99 Göttingen. Bad Godesberg 1963
- Dr. Dietrich Flieder: Landeskunde Niedersachsen., 1. Auflage. Paul List Verlag, München 1970, ISBN 3-471-18876-2 . S. 284 ff.

== See also ==
- Leine Uplands region
- Hödeken
