= Delligsen =

- Municipality
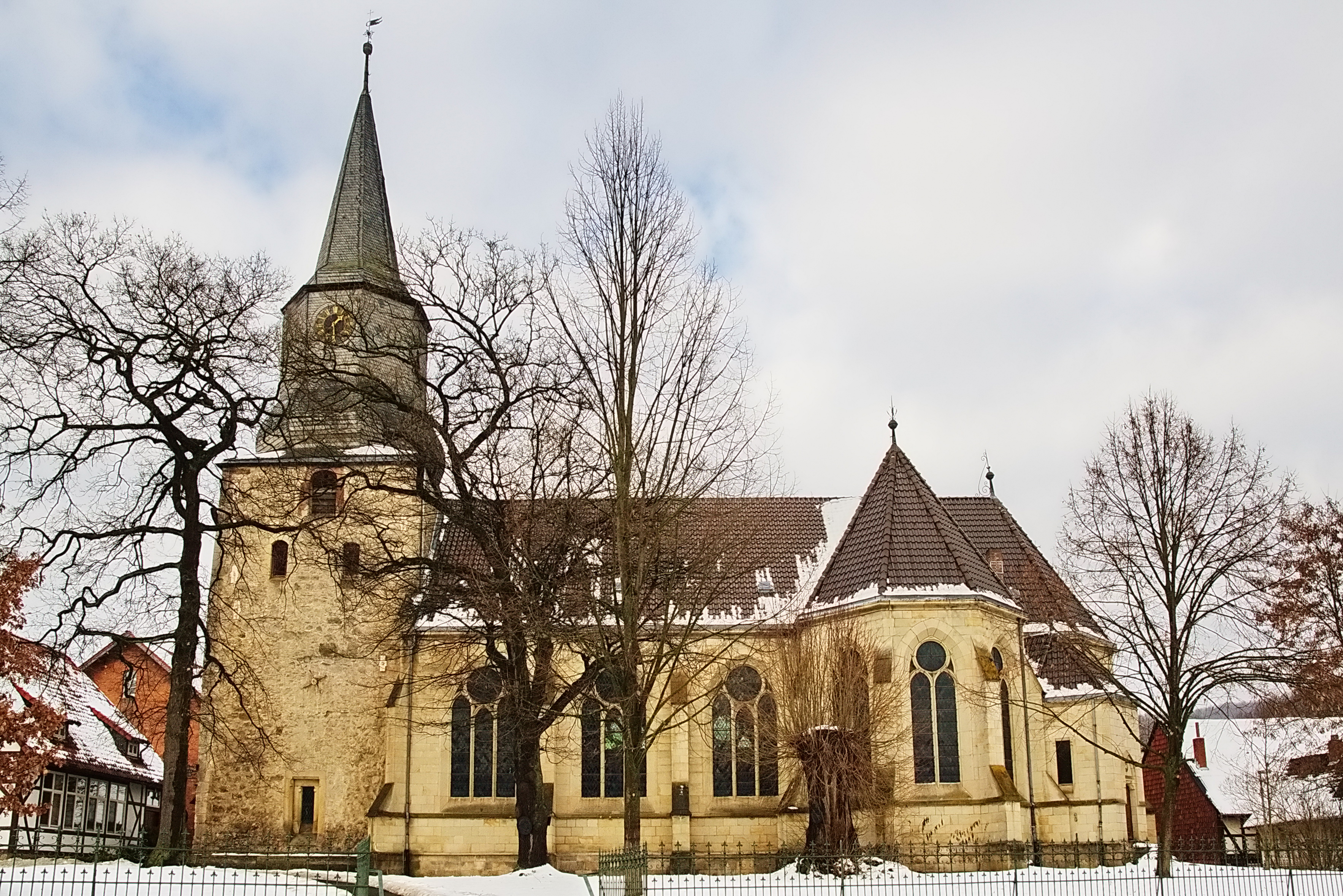
- Church in Delligsen

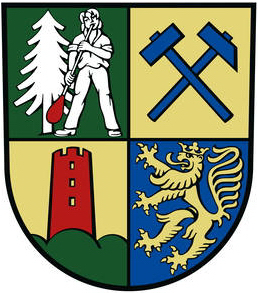
- Coat of arms

- Location of Delligsen within Holzminden district
- Interactive map of Delligsen
- Location within Germany Location within Lower Saxony
- Coordinates: 51°57′N 9°48′E
- Country: Germany
- State: Lower Saxony
- District: Holzminden
- Subdivisions: 6 districts

Government
  - Mayor (2019–24): Stephan Willudda

Area
  - Total: 36.01 km^{2} (13.90 sq mi)
- Elevation: 191 m (627 ft)

Population (2025-12-31)
  - Total: 7,218
  - Density: 200.4/km^{2} (519.1/sq mi)
- Time zone: UTC+01:00 (CET)
  - Summer (DST): UTC+02:00 (CEST)
- Postal codes: 31073
- Dialling codes: 05187
- Vehicle registration: HOL
- Website: www.delligsen.de

Delligsen is a municipality in Holzminden district, in Lower Saxony, Germany. It consists of six localities which were independent until 1974: Delligsen itself, Grünenplan, Ammensen, Hohenbüchen, Kaierde and Varrigsen. The area is dominated by the massif of the Hils hills

Delligsen itself has been an industrial settlement dominated by the Friedrich-Carls-Hütte ironworks which closed down in 1984.

Grünenplan further up in the Hils is an officially designated climate health resort. It has three centuries of history in glass manufacturing and still has a Schott AG glass factory. The factory was founded in 1744 by the prince of Brunswick's government in order to produce large mirrors.
