= Marienhagen =

- Ortsteil of Duingen
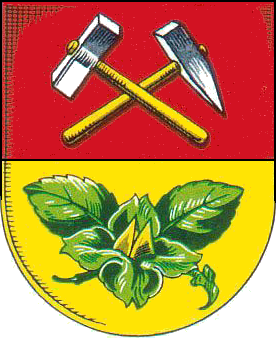
- Coat of arms
- Interactive map of Marienhagen
- Location within Germany Location within Lower Saxony
- Coordinates: 52°02′07″N 09°41′16″E
- Country: Germany
- State: Lower Saxony
- District: Hildesheim
- Municipality: Duingen

Area
  - Total: 6.23 km^{2} (2.41 sq mi)
- Elevation: 179 m (587 ft)

Population (2015-12-31)
  - Total: 727
  - Density: 117/km^{2} (302/sq mi)
- Time zone: UTC+01:00 (CET)
  - Summer (DST): UTC+02:00 (CEST)
- Postal codes: 31094
- Dialling codes: 05185
- Vehicle registration: HI
- Website: www.marienhagen.de

Marienhagen is a village and a former municipality in the district of Hildesheim in Lower Saxony, Germany. Since 1 November 2016, it is part of the municipality Duingen.
