= Hoyershausen =

- Ortsteil of Duingen
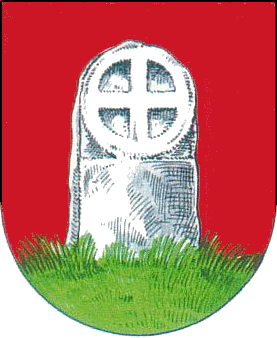
- Coat of arms
- Interactive map of Hoyershausen
- Location within Germany Location within Lower Saxony
- Coordinates: 52°1′6″N 9°45′12″E
- Country: Germany
- State: Lower Saxony
- District: Hildesheim
- Municipality: Duingen

Area
  - Total: 15.3 km^{2} (5.9 sq mi)
- Elevation: 139 m (456 ft)

Population (2015-12-31)
  - Total: 439
  - Density: 28.7/km^{2} (74.3/sq mi)
- Time zone: UTC+01:00 (CET)
  - Summer (DST): UTC+02:00 (CEST)
- Postal codes: 31093
- Dialling codes: 05185, 05181
- Vehicle registration: HI
- Website: www.hoyershausen.de

Hoyershausen is a village and a former municipality in the district of Hildesheim in Lower Saxony, Germany. Since 1 November 2016, it is part of the municipality Duingen.
