= Weenzen =

- Ortsteil of Duingen
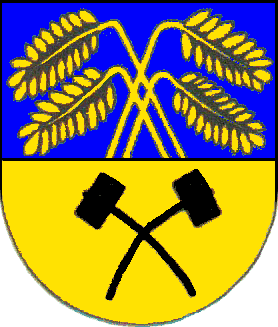
- Coat of arms
- Interactive map of Weenzen
- Location within Germany Location within Lower Saxony
- Coordinates: 52°02′N 09°40′E
- Country: Germany
- State: Lower Saxony
- District: Hildesheim
- Municipality: Duingen

Area
  - Total: 4.16 km^{2} (1.61 sq mi)
- Elevation: 230 m (750 ft)

Population (2015-12-31)
  - Total: 362
  - Density: 87.0/km^{2} (225/sq mi)
- Time zone: UTC+01:00 (CET)
  - Summer (DST): UTC+02:00 (CEST)
- Postal codes: 31096
- Dialling codes: 05185
- Vehicle registration: HI
- Website: www.Weenzen.de

Weenzen is a village and a former municipality in the district of Hildesheim in Lower Saxony, Germany. Since 1 November 2016, it is part of the municipality Duingen. As of 2025, it has approximately 380 residents.

Long-standing businesses based in Weenzen include an international haulage company and a funeral company. There are both active and inactive farmsteads.

Notable landmarks in Weenzen include the St. Maternus Chapel built in 1887 and an old school built from limestone. The southwestern part of the village was mined from the Middle Ages onward. Lignite was mined through 1966, after which was the area was recultivated. Today the Weenzer Bruch is a geologic educational and recreational area.

As of February 2023, Weenzen has its own volunteer fire brigade.
