= Coppengrave =

- Ortsteil of Duingen
- Coat of arms
- Interactive map of Coppengrave
- Location within Germany Location within Lower Saxony
- Coordinates: 51°59′21″N 9°43′30″E
- Country: Germany
- State: Lower Saxony
- District: Hildesheim
- Municipality: Duingen

Area
  - Total: 3.20 km^{2} (1.24 sq mi)
- Elevation: 154 m (505 ft)

Population (2015-12-31)
  - Total: 616
  - Density: 192/km^{2} (499/sq mi)
- Time zone: UTC+01:00 (CET)
  - Summer (DST): UTC+02:00 (CEST)
- Postal codes: 31091
- Dialling codes: 05185
- Vehicle registration: HI
- Website: www.coppengrave.de

Coppengrave is a village and a former municipality in the district of Hildesheim in Lower Saxony, Germany. Since 1 November 2016, it is part of the municipality Duingen.
