= Duingen =

- Municipality
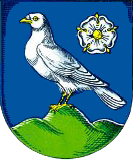
- Coat of arms

- Location of Duingen within Hildesheim district
- Interactive map of Duingen
- Location within Germany Location within Lower Saxony
- Coordinates: 52°00′N 09°42′E
- Country: Germany
- State: Lower Saxony
- District: Hildesheim
- Municipal assoc.: Leinebergland

Area
  - Total: 59.62 km^{2} (23.02 sq mi)
- Elevation: 193 m (633 ft)

Population (2025-12-31)
  - Total: 4,647
  - Density: 77.94/km^{2} (201.9/sq mi)
- Time zone: UTC+01:00 (CET)
  - Summer (DST): UTC+02:00 (CEST)
- Postal codes: 31089
- Dialling codes: 05185
- Vehicle registration: HI
- Website: www.Duingen.de

Duingen is a village and a municipality in the district of Hildesheim, in Lower Saxony, Germany. It is situated approximately 25 km southwest of Hildesheim, and 40 km south of Hanover. Since 1 November 2016, the former municipalities Coppengrave, Hoyershausen, Marienhagen and Weenzen are part of the municipality Duingen.

Duingen was the seat of the former Samtgemeinde ("collective municipality") Duingen.
