= Ith =

Mountain range in Germany

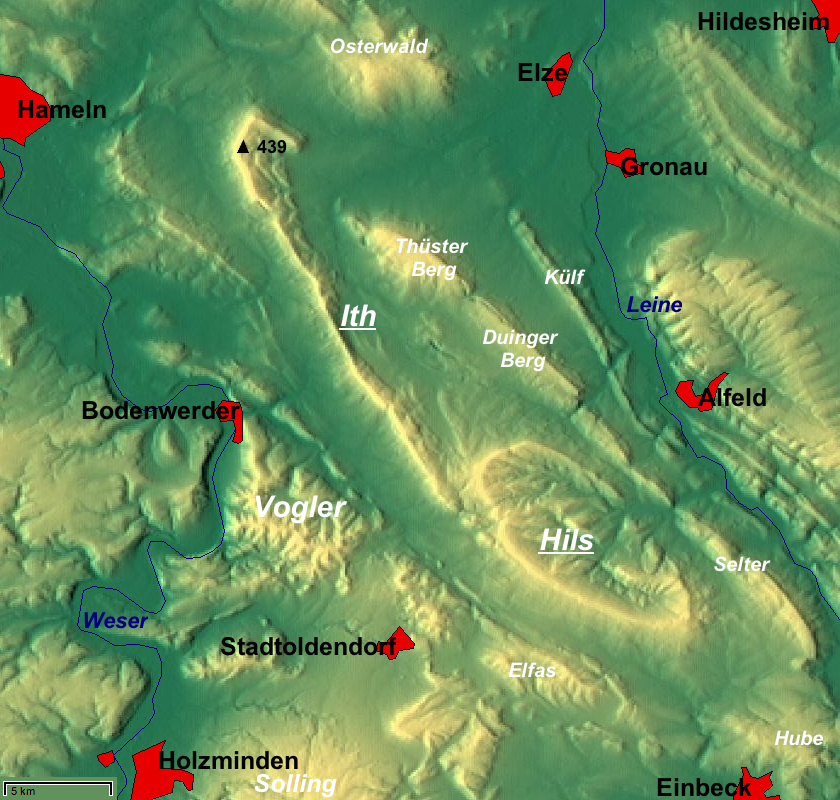
- Overview map: The Ith and Hils in the centre

Highest point
- Peak: Lauensteiner Kopf
- Elevation: 439 m (1,440 ft)

Dimensions
- Length: 22 km (14 mi)

Geography
- Country: Germany
- State: Lower Saxony
- Range coordinates: 52°03′00″N 9°34′00″E
- Parent range: Leine Uplands

Geology
- Rock age: Upper Jurassic
- Rock type: Limestone

The Ith (German: [iːt]) is a ridge in Germany's Central Uplands which is up to 439 m high. It lies about 40 km southwest of Hanover and, at 22 kilometers, is the longest line of crags in North Germany.

== Geography ==
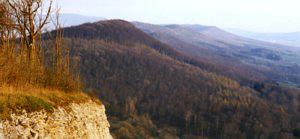
View over the forested crest of the Ith to the southeast. Its light-coloured limestone can be seen in the foreground

=== Location ===
The Ith is immediately northwest of the Hils ridge in the Leine Uplands. It runs in a northwest–southeast direction from Coppenbrügge in the north to Holzen in the south. The highest elevation on this forested knife-edge ridge is the Lauensteiner Kopf at 439 m above NN which has an observation tower, the Ithturm, and is located in the northern half of the Ith, the so-called Krüllbrink, between the villages of Bisperode and Lauenstein.

The streams on the Ith flow west via the Ilse, Remte and Lenne into the Weser or east via the Saale into the Leine.

The Ith is crossed by two roads: in the north by the L 425 between Haus Harderode and Lauenstein over the Lauenstein Pass, and in the south by the B 240 between Lüerdissen and Capellenhagen over the Holzener Pass.

=== Hills ===
The highest hill on the densely forested Ith is the Lauensteiner Kopf at 439 m above NN. It is located in the Krüllbrink, the name of the northern part of the Ith and has an observation tower, the Ith Tower.

This hill, together with other summits, crags and foothills of the Ith are given below in order of their height in metres (m) above Normalnull (NN unless stated otherwise):

- Lauensteiner Kopf (ca. 439 m), between Bisperode and Lauenstein; with the Ith Tower
- Hunzener Klippen (ca. 412 m), near Hunzen
- Oberberg (ca. 407 m), between Coppenbrügge and Lauenstein; with the Falkenstein natural monument
- Rothestein (ca. 395 m), near Holzen-Ith; with Ithwiesen Glider Airfield and near the Rothestein Cave
- Eggerser Berg (ca. 380 m), between Bremke and Domäne Eggersen
- Hohenstein (307.2 m), between Lauenstein and Marienau
- Krähenberg (ca. 270 m), near Lauenstein
- Dornbrink (ca. 233 m), near Lauenstein

== Sport and tourism ==
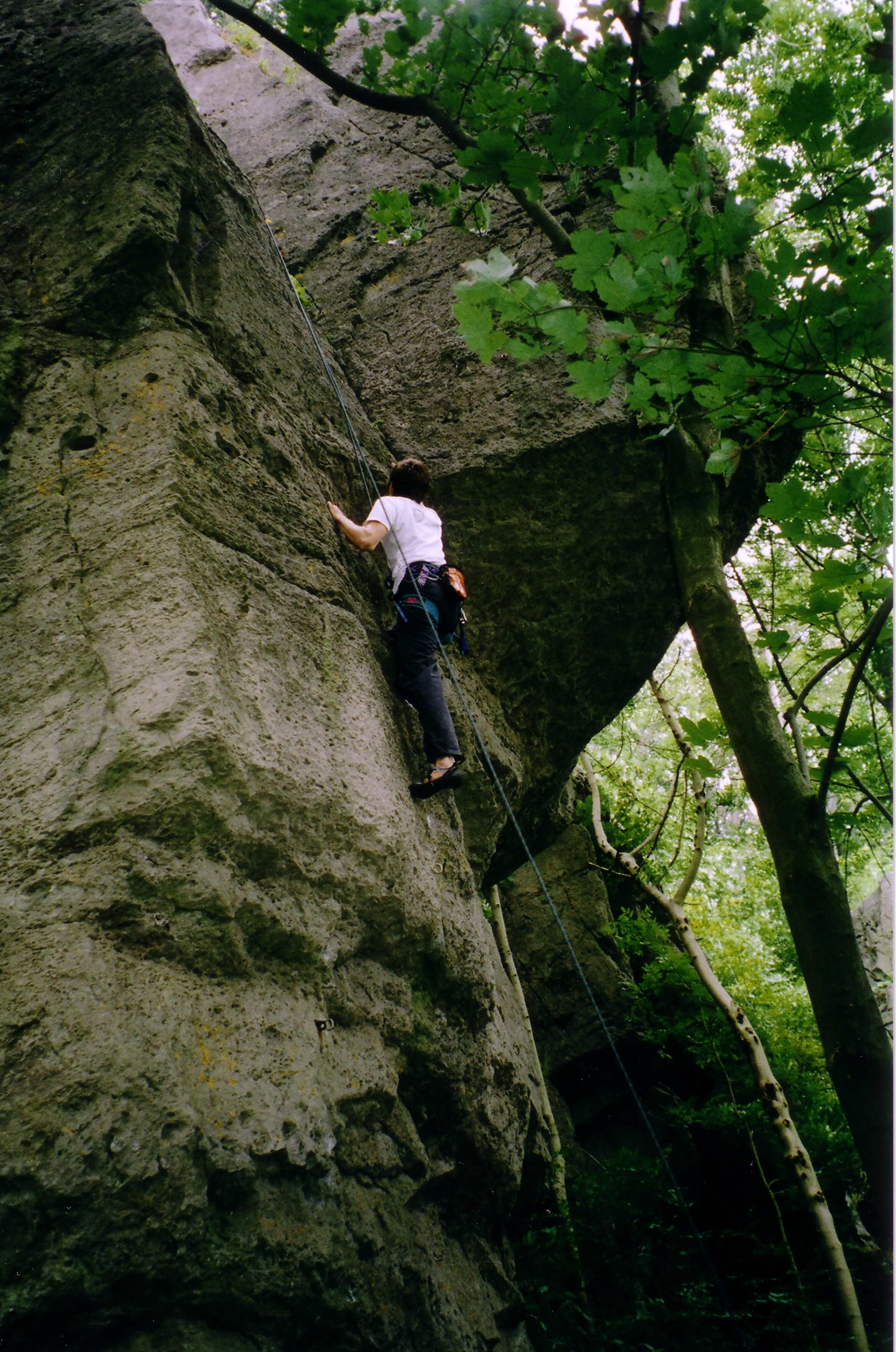
Climbers on the Ith crags

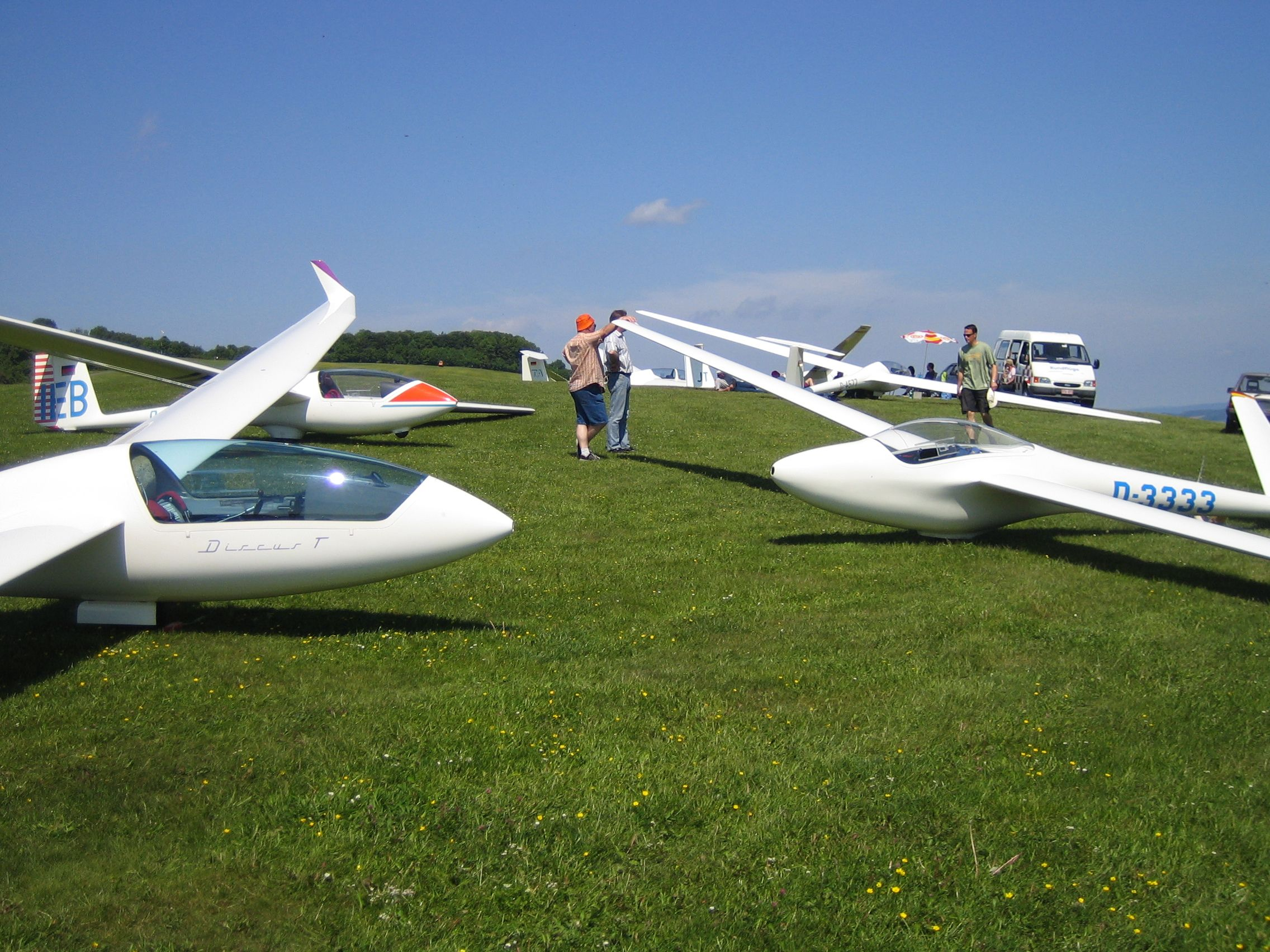
Gliders on Ithwiesen airfield

The Ith is a popular destination especially for hikers, climbers and glider pilots. The ridgeway draws many walkers especially in the springtime, when trees and flowers are blossoming, due to the distinctive stands of Wood Anemone and Bulbous Corydalis. There are several well-signed footpaths on the Ith heights. The section from Bisperode to Holzen of European walking route E11 runs along the crest of the Ith.

There are a large number of striking rock formations (Klippen) along the Ith ridge, some of which may be used for climbing. These include the Lüerdissener Klippen that are up to 30 m high. As a result, the Ith is the busiest climbing area in the state of Lower Saxony. Almost all the rocks are named; examples include the Adam und Eva, the Kamel, the Teufelsküche ("Devil's Kitchen"), the Mönchstein ("Monk's Rock"), the Krötenkopf ("Frog's Head"), and the Garwindelstein.

At the southern end of the ridge, north of the parish of Holzen – reached over the Holzen Pass (B 240) – lies below the 395 m high Rothenstein the Ithwiesen Glider Airfield used by the aviation sports club of Ithwiesen. There has been an airfield on the crest of the Ith since the early 1930s. In 1942, the Nazi leadership established the Ith Reichs Glider School in Holzen-Ith. Many pilots received their basic flying training there until the end of the war. After the war ended British occupation forces used the terrain as a "Rest Centre", a type of recreation centre. In 1949, the AHQ Gliding Club, to which up to 30 active pilots in the RAF belonged, took over training on the site. In 1971 the first community service school in Germany was established here, the Zivildienstschule I. The present glider airfield is located somewhat south east of the original one and no longer uses the old buildings. On 8 June 1979, a Bundeswehr helicopter of the Alouette II type crashed on landing on the Ith airfield. The pilot from the 12th Army Aviation Squadron (Heeresfliegerstaffel 12) and two accompanying soldiers of the 352nd Panzergrenadier Battalion (Panzergrenadierbataillon 352) were killed. Since 8 June 1987, there has been a monument on the Ith in their memory.

On the Ith, but not at the top, there are two other glider airfields: Hellenhagen Airfield in Halle-Bremke and Ith-West Airfield in Bisperode.

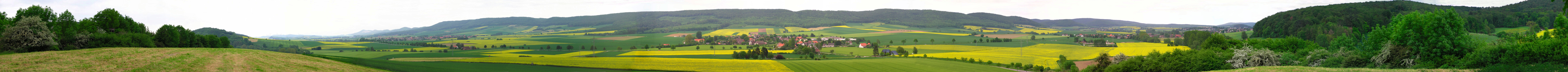
View of the Ith ridge from the southwest at Oelkassen on the Vogler looking towards Dielmissen (left), Lüerdissen (centre) and Scharfoldendorf (right); in the background is part of the Hils

== Literature ==
- Bundesanstalt für Landeskunde und Raumforschung: Geographische Landesaufnahme 1:200000. Naturräumliche Gliederung Deutschlands. Die naturräumlichen Einheiten auf Blatt 86 Hannover. Bad Godesberg 1960
- Hans-Jürgen Klink: Naturräumliche Gliederung des Ith-Hils-Berglandes. Bundesforschungsanstalt für Landeskunde und Raumforschung. 1966. ISBN B0000BS19H
- Friedmut Lehmeier: Regionale Geomorphologie des nördlichen Ith-Hils-Berglandes auf der Basis einer grossmaßstäbigen geomorphologischen Kartierung. Goltze Druck, Göttingen. 1981. ISBN 3-88452-078-4
- Michael Geschwinde: Höhlen im Ith. Urgeschichtliche Opferstätten im südniedersächsischen Bergland. o.O. 1988. ISBN 3-7848-1233-3
- Richard Goedeke: Weser-Leine-Bergland. Verlag J. Berg, München. 1991. ISBN 3-7634-1049-X (zum Ith: S. 76–217)
- Ludger Feldmann, Hans Joachim Franzke, Rainer Müller: Die geologische Entwicklung der Tiefebene und der Mittelgebirge in Niedersachsen. (pdf) In: Veröffentlichungen der Akademie für Geowissenschaften zu Hannover. 20/2002. S. 8–19
