= Weper =

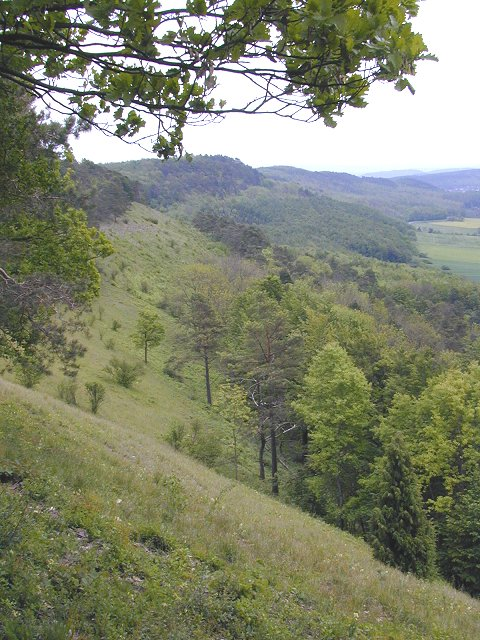
- Western slope of the Weper (the dry grassland of the Weper Nature Reserve in the foreground)

Highest point
- Peak: Balos
- Elevation: 379 m (1,243 ft)

Geography
- State(s): Northeim, Lower Saxony, Germany
- Range coordinates: 51°41′25″N 9°49′6″E
- Parent range: Leine Uplands, Lower Saxon Hills

The Weper is a long, high ridge of hills up to 379 m above sea level (NN) located in the district of Northeim in the German state of Lower Saxony.

Part of the Weper is a nature reserve with the same name which, with an area of 200 hectares (490 acres), is the large protected region of dry grassland in Lower Saxony.

== Geography ==
The Weper, which lies in South Lower Saxony and reaches a height of 379 m at the summit of the Balos, belongs to the southern part of the Leine Uplands. The ridge is located between the southeastern foothills of the Solling to the west and the rather distant valley of the Leine to the east. It runs in a north–south direction west of the town of Moringen, between Fredelsloh in the north and Hardegsen in the south. North of the Weper is the Ahlsburg ridge (up to 411.4 m), south is the small Gladeberg ridge (up to 360.2 m). To the west and south the Weper is bypassed by the upper reaches of a left-hand, western tributary of the Leine, the Espolde.

== Description ==
The Weper, much of which is covered by the eastern part of the Hardegsen State Forest, is heavily wooded in its narrow south, but largely open in the more extensive north. On the western slopes in the Weper Nature Reserve, large areas are kept artificially open in order to preserve the dry chalk grasslands with their rare plant and animal species. Prior to the 19th century, virtually the whole of the Weper was open before it was reforested. In the north, there is a glider airfield on south-southeast of the Tönniesberg and not far west of Nienhagen. On the Balos, is the Sohnrey Hut (Sohnreyhütte), named after Heinrich Sohnrey who once lived in Nienhagen, from where the entire surrounding countryside can be viewed.

== Hills ==
The hills and elevations of the Weper ridge include:

- Balos (379 m above sea level (NN); in the centre)
- Tönniesberg (369.6 m; in the north)
- Wackelberg (365.3 m; in the north)
- Schweineschraube (357.3 m; in the north)
- Thausegesberg (357.3 m; in the south)
- Hohe Rodt (313.0 m; in the centre)
- Hünscheburg (274 m; in the south)
- Eichelberg (260 m; in the south)

== Rivers ==
The rivers in and on the Weper ridge include (all in the catchment area of the Leine):

- Bölle (rises on the southern edge of the Ahlsburg, passes the northeastern foothills of the Weper and is a western tributary of the Leine)
- Dieße (rises on the eastern edge of the Solling, passes the northwestern foothills of the Weper and is a south-southwestern tributary of the Ilme)
- Espolde (rises on the eastern edge of the Solling, passes the Weper to the west and south and is a western tributary of the Leine)
- Moore (rises on the eastern slopes of the Weper and flows eastwards. It is a western tributary of the Leine)
- Ummelbach (rises on the southeastern slopes of the Weper and flows eastwards. It is a northwestern tributary of the Espolde)

== Towns and villages ==
The towns, villages and hamlets around the Weper ridge are:
(clockwise from the north)

- Moringen (in the northeast)
  - Lutterbeck (in the northeast)
  - Oldenrode (in the northeast)
  - Nienhagen (in the east)
  - Blankenhagen (in the southeast)
  - Thüdinghausen (in the southeast)
  - Tönnieshof (in the northwest)
  - Fredelsloh (in the north-northwest)
- Hardegsen (to the south)
  - Lutterhausen (in the southeast)
  - Leisenrode (in the southwest)
  - Ludwigshöhe (in the southwest)
  - Trögen (in the west)
  - Üssinghausen (in the west)
  - Espol (in the west)
