= Köterberg =

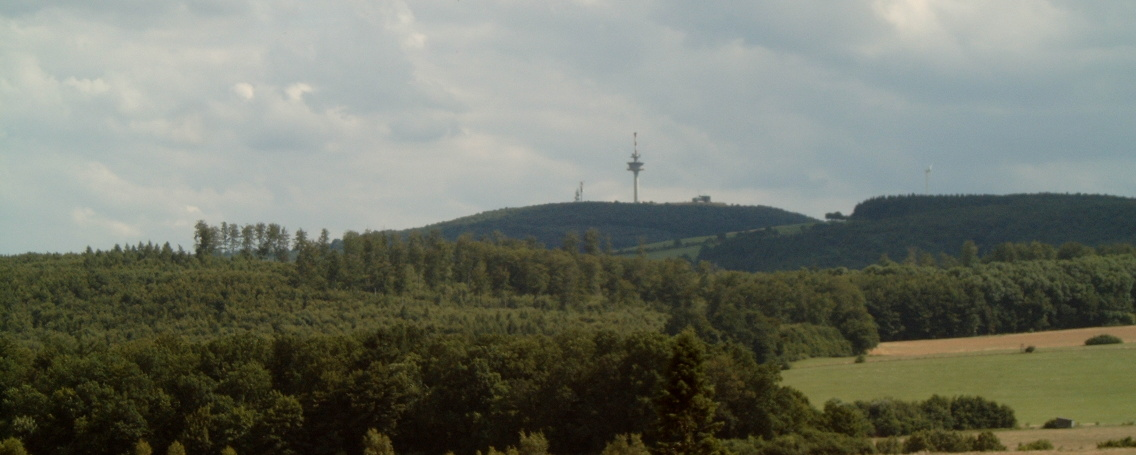
- Köterberg, north side

Highest point
- Elevation: 495.8 m above sea level (NN) (1,627 ft)
- Coordinates: 51°51′20″N 9°19′30″E

Geography
- Location within North Rhine-Westphalia
- Location: North Rhine-Westphalia, Lower Saxony, Germany
- Parent range: Lippe Uplands

The Köterberg (German pronunciation: [ˈkøːtɐˌbɛʁk]), at 495.8 m (1,627 ft) above sea level, is the highest hill in the Lippe Uplands and lies on the state border between North Rhine-Westphalia and Lower Saxony in North Germany. On its northern slopes is the village of Köterberg.

== Geography ==
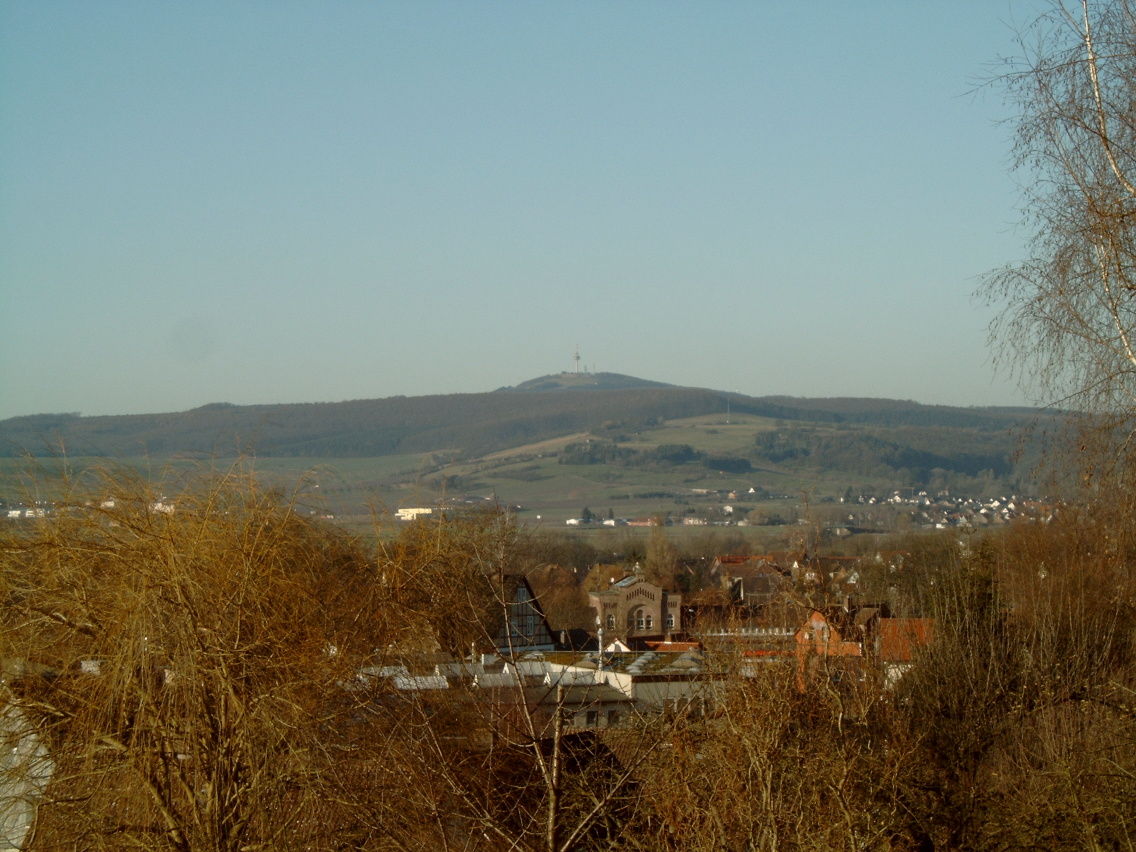
View of the Köterberg from Holzminden

The Köterberg is located in the centre of the Weser Uplands, towering high above the surrounding land northwest of the town of Höxter and south-southeast of Lügde within whose municipal area its summit lies.

Its peak and much of the crest lie in North Rhine-Westphalia. Only a very narrow tongue of land belongs to Lower Saxony, albeit reaching to the summit with its lower reaches lying mainly within the valley of a stream. At the western end of this strip of land the districts of Lippe, Höxter and Holzminden meet at the summit.

In the German Main Triangulation Network (Deutsches Hauptdreiecksnetz or DHDN), the Köterberg is a major triangulation station with the name Lügde, Köterberg. The area of the summit is only wooded to the north which is why the hill is easy to recognise from a distance and offers good views (see below).

== Geology ==
The Köterberg is part of the Lippe Uplands, a region whose basis is formed by Mesozoic strata of Muschelkalk and Keuper. The hills itself is built on sandstones and marls of the Upper Keuper.

== History ==
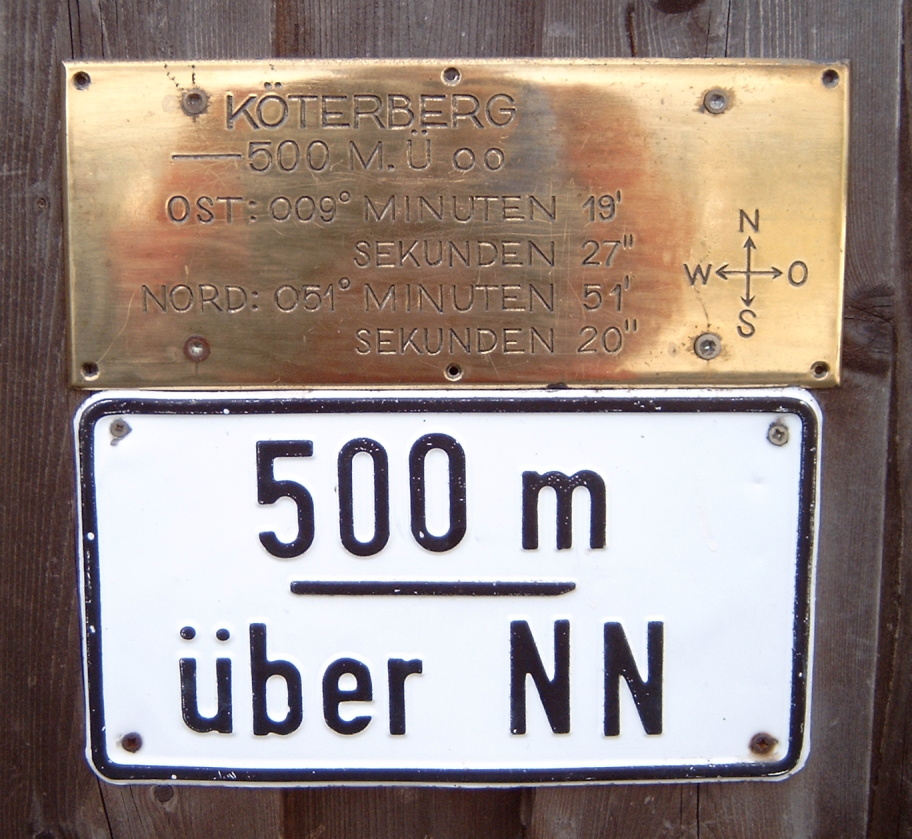
Summit signs on the Köterberghaus

The Köterberg was already being mentioned in Lippe's boundary deeds in the 16th century. The Brothers Grimm called it the Götzenberg in their German Legends (Nos. 9, 20), because it was here that folk prayed to the gods of the heath. The Köterberg was also the setting for their fairy tale The Three Little Birds. Between 1796 and 1801, Karl Ludwig von Lecoq incorporated the Keutersberg as a triangulation point in his military-topographical surveys.

In 1831/32, the first solid structure appeared on the highest point of the hill: a 15½-foot (4.9 m) high tower as a category 1 triangulation mark. The Köterberg was a station in the Prussian semaphore system, which acted as a communication link between Berlin and Koblenz from 1832 to 1849. Since 1929, the Köterberghaus has stood on the summit. Two signs on the Köterberghaus give the height of the Köterberg, incorrectly, as 500 m AMSL. This error is often repeated in the advertising. Since 1971, a telecommunication tower has stood on the summit.

Today the Köterberg is sometimes referred to jokingly as Monte Wauwau. Both "Köter" ("mutt") and "Wauwau" ("bow-wow") are vernacular terms for a dog.

== Telecommunication tower ==
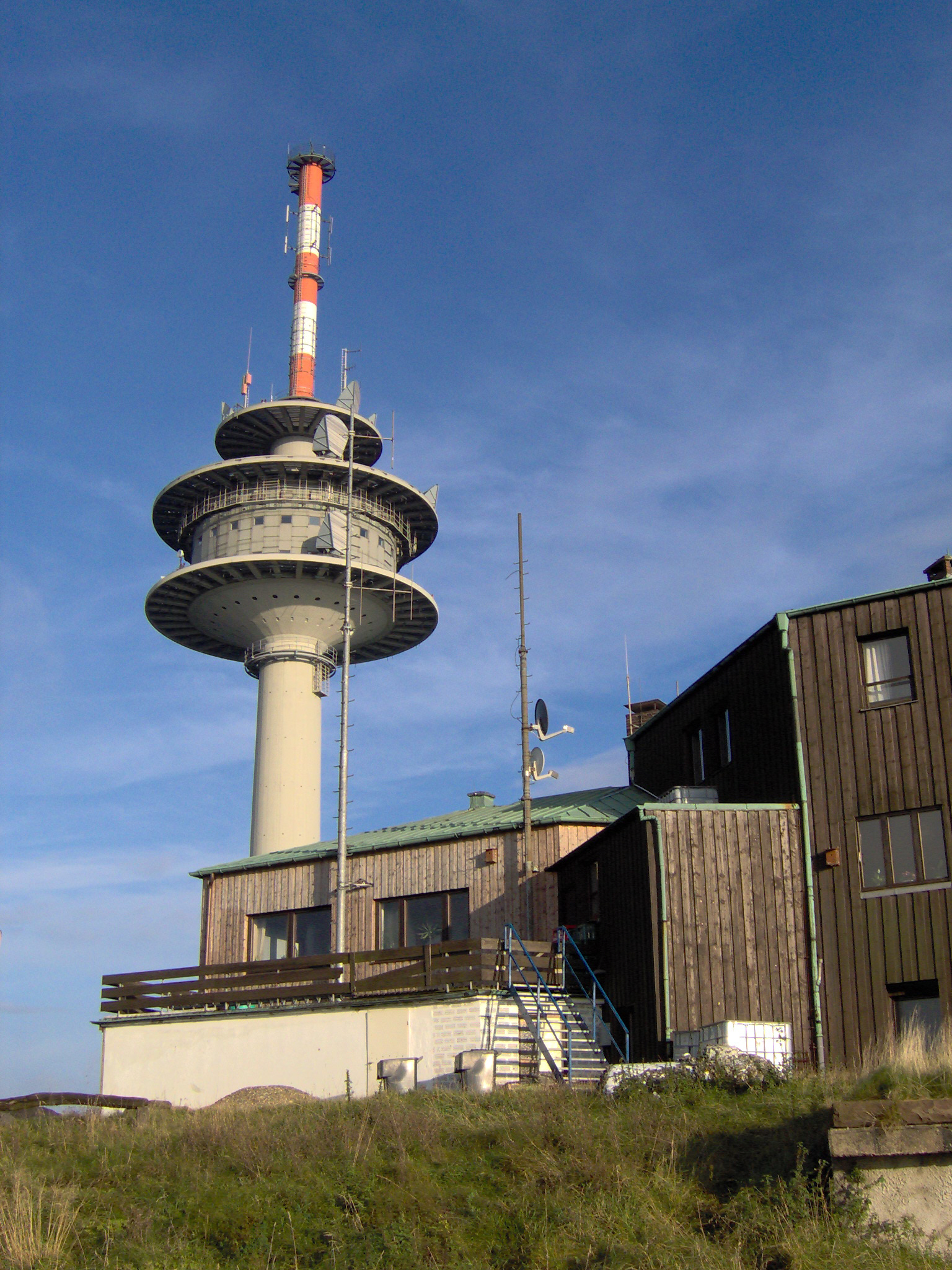
The Köterberghaus and telecommunication tower

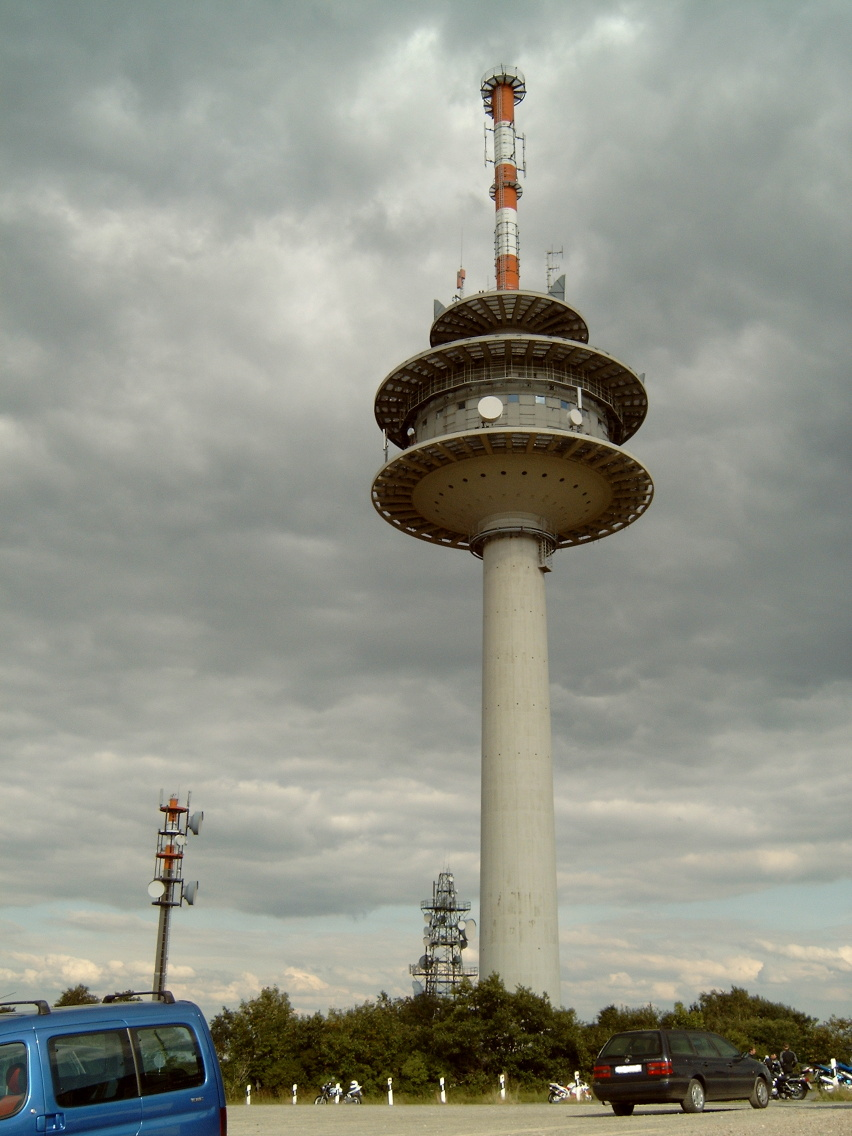
The telecommunication tower and related facilities

The telecommunication tower (a 'standard' tower; 100 m or 330 ft high) on the summit of the Köterberg was built in 1971 by the Deutsche Bundespost and handles wireless telephone traffic.

The three different antenna towers on the hilltop are microwave radio relay stations, used for police, fire service and amateur radio relays as well as Bundeswehr communications. The 70 cm amateur radio relay station, DB0KB, works on a frequency of 439.425 MHz.

The relay coupling (Relaiskopplung) is out of service.

The U.S. Army Communications Engineering and Installation Agency (USACEIA) installed a transmission and radio facility here from May 1984 to May 1985.

== Field of view ==
Since the summit plateau on the Köterberg, which can be accessed via a cul-de-sac road from Lügde-Köterberg, has little forest-coverage, it provides an all-round view of the surrounding regions. This view includes more than just of the border region of the above-mentioned federal states; for example, the Habichtswald and Kaufungen Forest in Northe Hesse and to the Harz mountains that stretch across Lower Saxony, Saxony-Anhalt and Thuringia are visible.

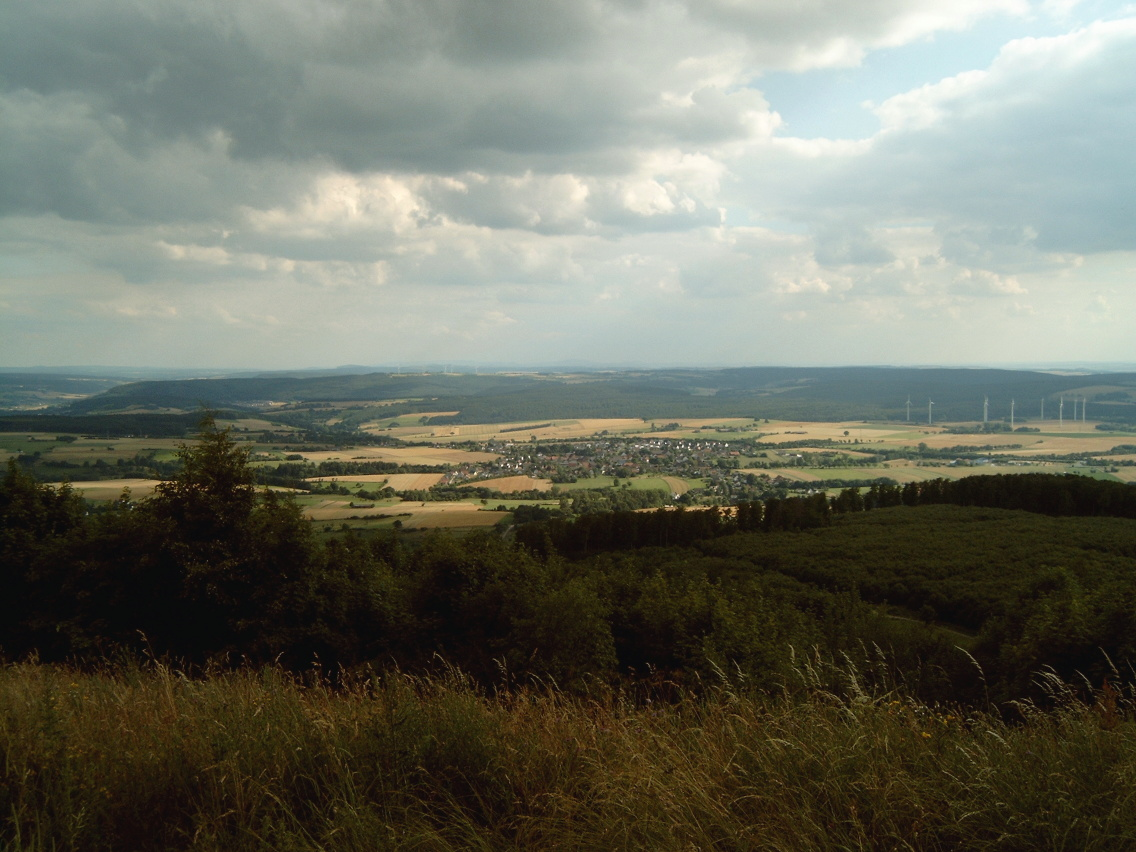
View from the summit towards the south

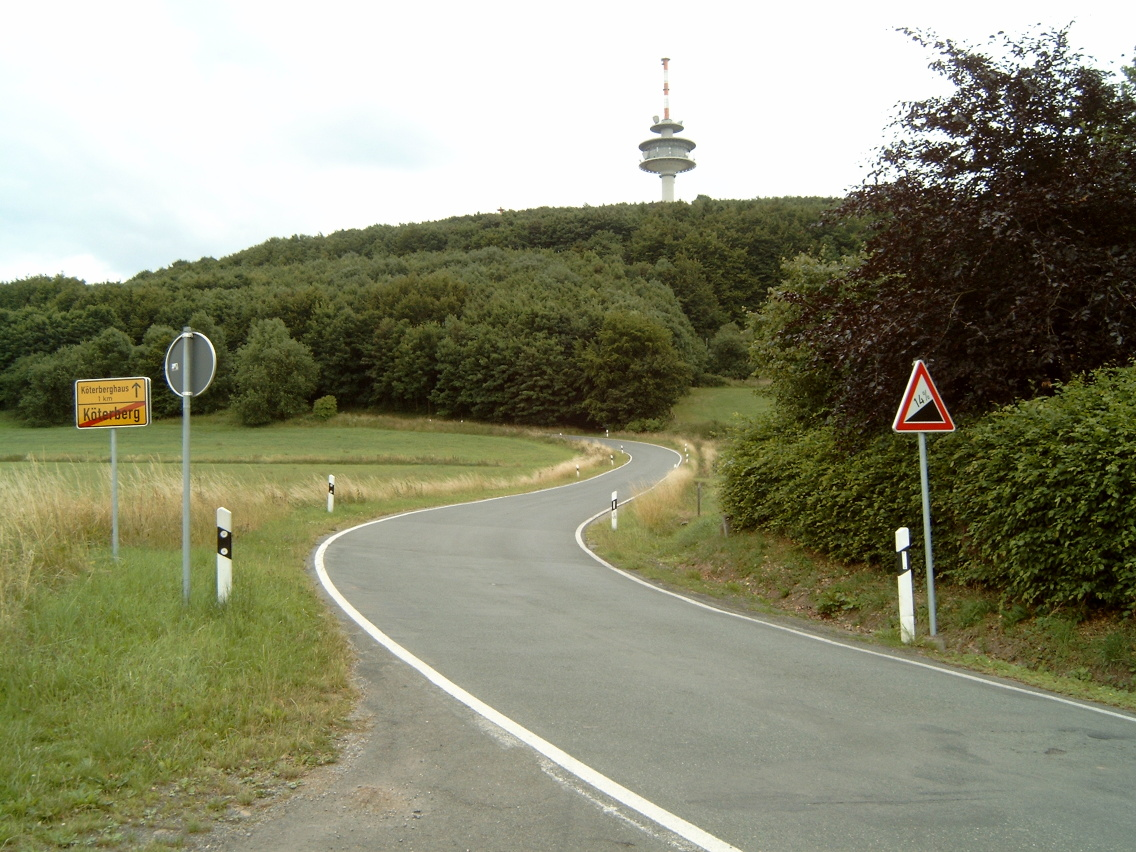
Road to the top

The landmarks that can be seen include:

- Biesterfeld to the northwest
- Desenberg near Warburg
- the Harz mountains including the Brocken
- Holzminden
- the Kaufungen Forest
- Höxter
- the High Habichtswald including the Hercules monument
- the Eggegebirge including the Externsteine
- the Teutoburg Forest including the Hermannsdenkmal

As a result of the good views and especially its open isolated location, in both respects similar to the Brocken in the Harz, the Köterberg gives the impression of being the highest point in the Weser Uplands, although the Solling is actually higher in four places (Große Blöße, Großer Ahrensberg, Moosberg and Vogelherd). The hills of the Solling are, however, all heavily wooded, mostly featureless and, from a distance, indistinguishable. The Köterberg is therefore known as the "Brocken of the Weser Uplands".

== Tourism ==
During the summer months, many bikers often meet on the summit at weekends to converse which results in a considerable number of motorbikes in the car park. Likewise, keen cyclists also ride up the Köterberg. The road between the village of Köterberg and the summit has a maximum gradient of 14%. Radio hams use the peak because it is an excellent site for transmission and reception. In the Köterberghaus is a restaurant.
