= Ahlsburg =

Hill range in Germany

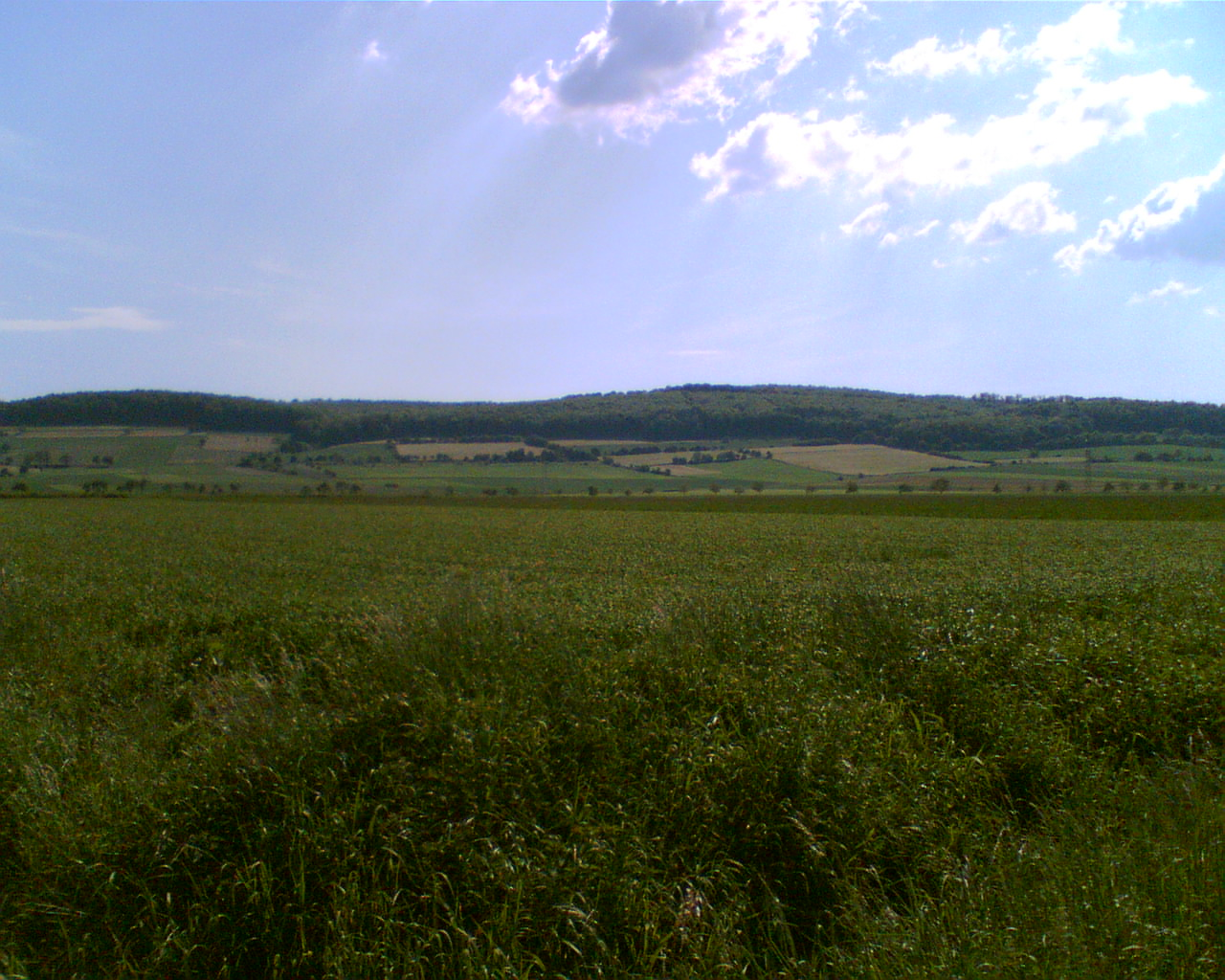
- Northeast side of the Ahlsburg ridge

Highest point
- Peak: Sackberg
- Elevation: 411.4 m above NHN

Dimensions
- Length: 7 km (4.3 mi)

Geography
- Location within Lower Saxony
- State(s): Northeim county, South Lower Saxony, Germany
- Range coordinates: 51°44′46″N 9°49′12″E
- Parent range: Solling Foreland, Weser-Leine Uplands

The Ahlsburg is a range of bunter sandstone hills, relatively small in area and up to 411.4 m above sea level (NN), in the southern part of Lower Saxony, Germany. It lies within the Solling foreland and is part of the Weser-Leine Uplands.

== Geography ==
The Ahlsburg hills run in a northwest to southeast direction and are around 10 km long and up to about 3 km wide. They are heavily wooded and belong to the Leine Uplands. They are located in the district of Northeim southeast of Dassel, east of the Solling, south of Einbeck and the valley of the Ilme, west of Northeim and the Leine valley and north of Moringen and northeast of Fredelsloh.

=== Natural regions ===
The Ahlsburg is grouped within the following natural regions:

- (to 37 Weser-Leine Uplands)
  - (to 371 Solling Foreland)
    - 371.1 South Solling Foreland
      - 371.12 Ahlsburg

== Hills ==
The following hills and elevations belong to the Ahlsburg ridge – with their heights in metres above sea level (Normalnull or NN):

- Sackberg (411.4 m)
- Ochsenberg (371.5 m)
- Ducksteinberg (360.1 m)
- Eichfast (355.5 m)
- Südlieth (325.9 m)
- Weidenberg (317.5 m)
- Iberg (303.0 m)
- Klagesberg (298.2 m)
- unnamed hill, site of Grubenhagen Castle (298.0 m)
- Böllenberg (297.5 m)
- Wolfsberg (297.5 m)
  Subpeaks from southeast to northwest:
  - Bärenberg/Bährenberg (262.5 m)
  - Grundberg (257.5 m)
  - Kahlenberg (247.5 m)
  - Lith (262.5 m)
  - Ziegenberg (250.3 m)
  - Wellerser Dicke (237.5 m)
- Vorberg (289.1 m)
- Behrensberg (277.9 m)
- Drogenberg (247.5 m)
- Katenstein (240.7 m)

== Streams ==
The following streams flow in and around the Ahlsburg (all in the catchment area of the Leine):

- Bölle (rises on the southern edge of the ridge, passes its southern foothills and is a western tributary of the Leine)
- Dieße (rises on the eastern edge of the Solling, passes the western slopes of the ridge and is a south-southwestern tributary of the Ilme)
- Ilme (passes the ridge some way to the north and is a western tributary of the Leine)
- Leine (passes the ridge some way to the east and is a southern tributary of the Aller)
- Rebbe (rises in the central part of the ridge and is a southern tributary of the Ilme)
- Rotte (rises north of the ridge and is a southern tributary of the Ilme)
- Hane (rises in the central part of the ridge and is a southern tributary of the Dieße)

== Places of interest ==
Places of interest in and on the Ahlsburg ridge – with heights in metres above sea level ( NN) - include:

- Grubenhagen Castle (298.0 m)
- Fredelsloh (ca. 270 m; art and pottery village)
- Kaisereiche (ca. 240 m)
- Quastbuche (331 m)
- Stahlbuche (ca. 310 m)
- Bengerode ruined village (ca. 265 m; medieval pottery settlement)
