= Ellensen Forest =

Hill range in Germany

Coordinates: 51.7812°N 9.7115°E

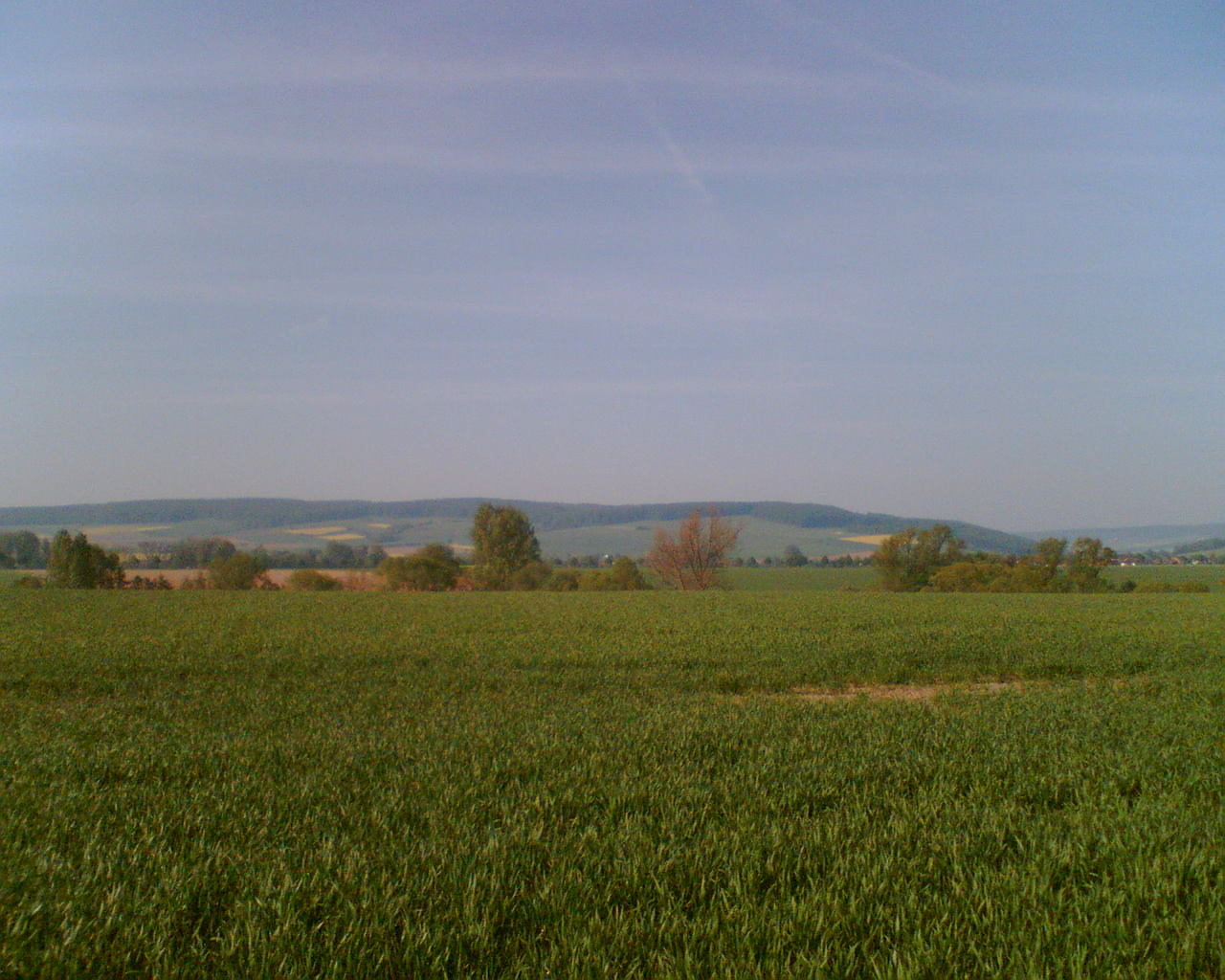
In the background: Ellensen Forest

Ellensen Forest (German: Ellenser Wald) is a low mountain range in the Leine Uplands, sited at the city of Dassel in South Lower Saxony, Germany. It is named for Ellensen, a district of Dassel.

Ellensen Forest lies between Solling and Ahlsburg mountain ranges and is separated from the Ahlsburg by the valley of the Dieße river. Among the hills of Ellensen Forest are Scharfenberg (342 m) and Burgberg (306 m), where the Ilme valley is adjoining.

The forest is mainly made up of common beech (Fagus sylvatica), which is almost unchanged for more than 200 years, as land surveying has shown. The forest grounds on limestone of the Muschelkalk age.
