= Krummes Wasser =

River in Germany

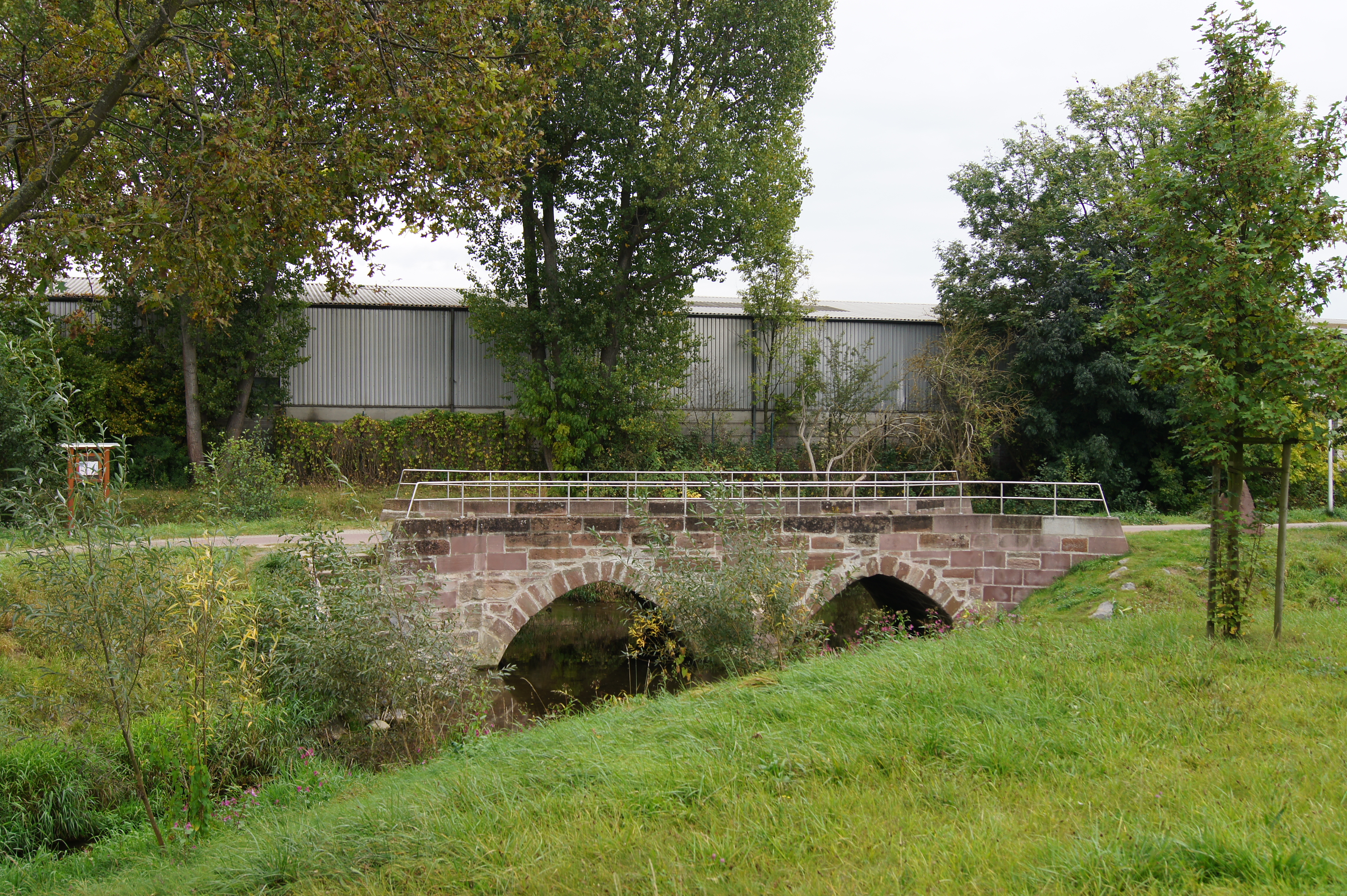
- Bridge over the Krummes Wasser at Einbeck

Location
- Country: Germany
- State: Lower Saxony

Physical characteristics
- Mouth
  - location: Ilme
  - coordinates: 51.8106°N 9.8687°E
- Length: 18.2 km (11.3 mi)

Basin features
- Progression: Ilme→ Leine→ Aller→ Weser→ North Sea

Krummes Wasser (in its upper course: Hillebach) is a river of Lower Saxony, Germany. It flows into the Ilme in Einbeck.

== See also ==
- List of rivers of Lower Saxony
