= Großer Steinberg (Solling) =

- Location within Lower Saxony

Highest point
- Elevation: 493 m above sea level (NN) (1,617 ft)
- Coordinates: 51°42′18″N 9°39′57″E

Geography
- Location: Lower Saxony, Germany
- Parent range: Solling, Weserbergland

The Großer Steinberg is a 493 m above sea level (NN) high hill in the south of the Solling range. It lies within the district of Northeim, in the southwestern part of the German state of Lower Saxony.

== Geography ==
The densely wooded hill of the Großer Steinberg is in the southern part of the Solling-Vogler Nature Park just under 6 km north-northeast of the town of Uslar. The hill may be climbed on several paths from the villages of Meinte and Vahle north of Uslar.

The summit region of the Großer Steinberg comprises two gently sloping hilltops that lie around 500 metres apart in a northwest-southeast orientation and have the following heights and coordinates:

- Northwest hilltop (Nordwestkuppe): 493 m above sea level (NN) (51°42′18″N 9°39′57″E)
- Southeast hilltop (Südostkuppe): 491 m above NN (51°42′3″N 9°40′2″E)

== Harzblick Observation Tower ==
On the southern slopes of the Großer Steinberg at a height of around 430 m is the Harzblick ("Harz View") observation tower, which is made of wood. Originally a tower was supposed to have been erected on this hill, the Solling Tower (Sollingturm), but after this had been built on the neighbouring Strutberg around 4.5 km away to the west, the Harzblick was set up on the Großer Steinberg.

From its viewing platform there are excellent views, for example, east to the Harz Mountains where the Brocken may be made out, south-southeast to the Gauß Tower on the Hoher Hagen in the Dransfeld Town Forest, south to the Kaufungen Forest and southwest to the Reinhardswald.
