= Emperor William Tower (Holzminden) =

Tower in Germany

Coordinates: 51°48′31.4″N 9°27′12.4″E

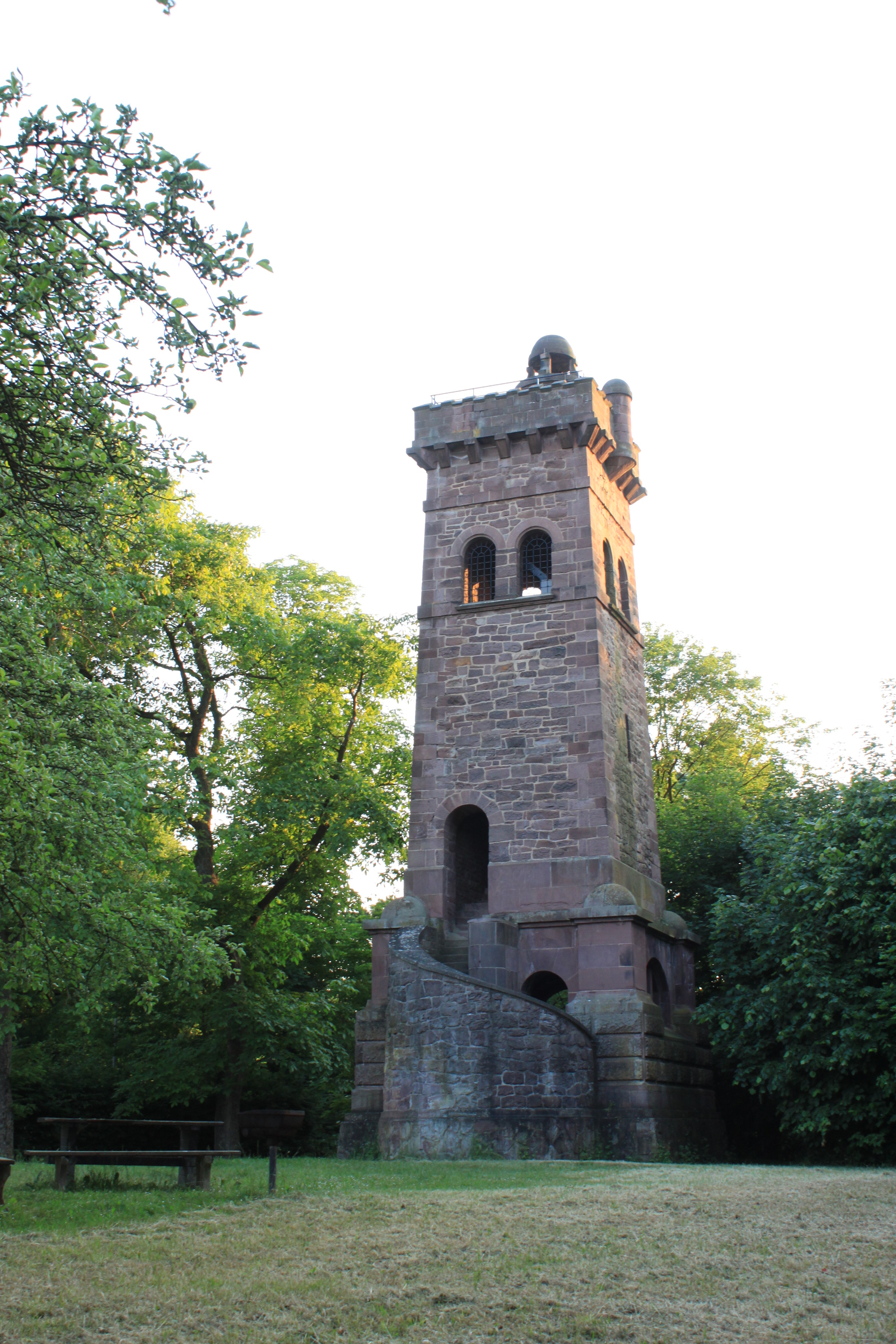
Emperor William Tower (2015)

The Emperor William Tower (German: Kaiser-Wilhelm-Turm) or Kaiser Wilhelm Tower is an observation tower near Holzminden in the German state of Lower Saxony, built in honour of the German emperor, [[[Wilhelm I]]. It was erected in 1908 and is 17 metres high.

== Location ==
The tower stands in the borough of Holzminden on the western slopes of the Sylbecker Berg (174 m above sea level (NHN)) south of the town. It is located on the southern edge of the municipal park at a height of about 170 m. About 400 metres to the west is a section of the road from Holzminden to Lüchtringen, the Landesstraße 550.

== History and description ==
The tower, built in 1908 of Weser sandstone to a square plan, has a viewing platform above the tower room. The western side of the platform has a round, decorative turret.

From the platform are views of the River Weser and the Solling hills.
