= Sonderturm =

Communication tower in Germany

Sondertürme (German for special towers) are communications towers of the former federal post office (now Deutsche Telekom AG), constructed of reinforced concrete, which were planned specially for a given location. A Sonderturm is typically better equipped than the Typenturm towers, and nearly always with a visitor centre. Sonderturm towers were established in close vicinity to large cities.
