= Moosberg =

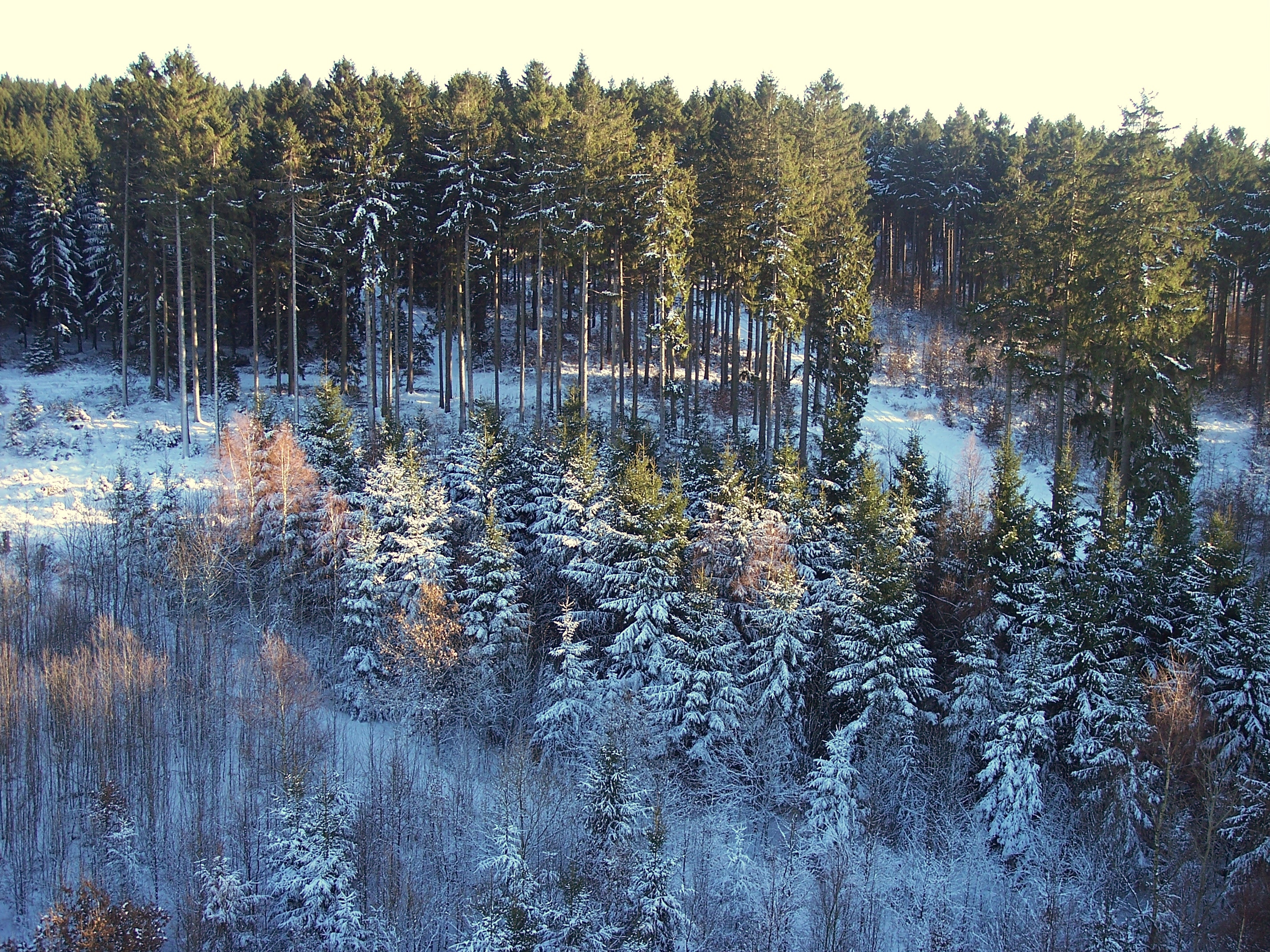
- The wooded summit of the Moosberg

Highest point
- Elevation: 513 m above sea level (NN) (1,683.1 ft)
- Coordinates: 51°45′13″N 9°33′09″E

Geography
- Location within Lower Saxony
- Location: Lower Saxony, Germany
- Parent range: Solling, Weser Uplands

The Moosberg is a 513.0 m high hill in the Solling range, which is located in southwestern Lower Saxony (Germany).

== Geography ==
The hill lies in the "Hochsolling", the central and highest part of the Solling, which is surrounded by the Solling-Vogler Nature Park. This heavily wooded hill is a little south of the halfway point between Boffzen and Dassel, as the crow flies, and around 1.5 km east of Neuhaus.

From topographical maps it is clear, for example from trigonometric points that there are three different summit on the Moosberg at 513.0 m (north), 508.7 m (centre) and 508.6 m (south).

On the western slope of the Moosberg is the Hochsolling Observation Tower.

== Sights ==
- Hochsolling Observation Tower
- Mecklenbruch (raised bog and nature reserve)
- Neuhaus Deer Park (and forest museum)
