= Typenturm =

Coordinates: 54°54′40″N 8°18′25″E

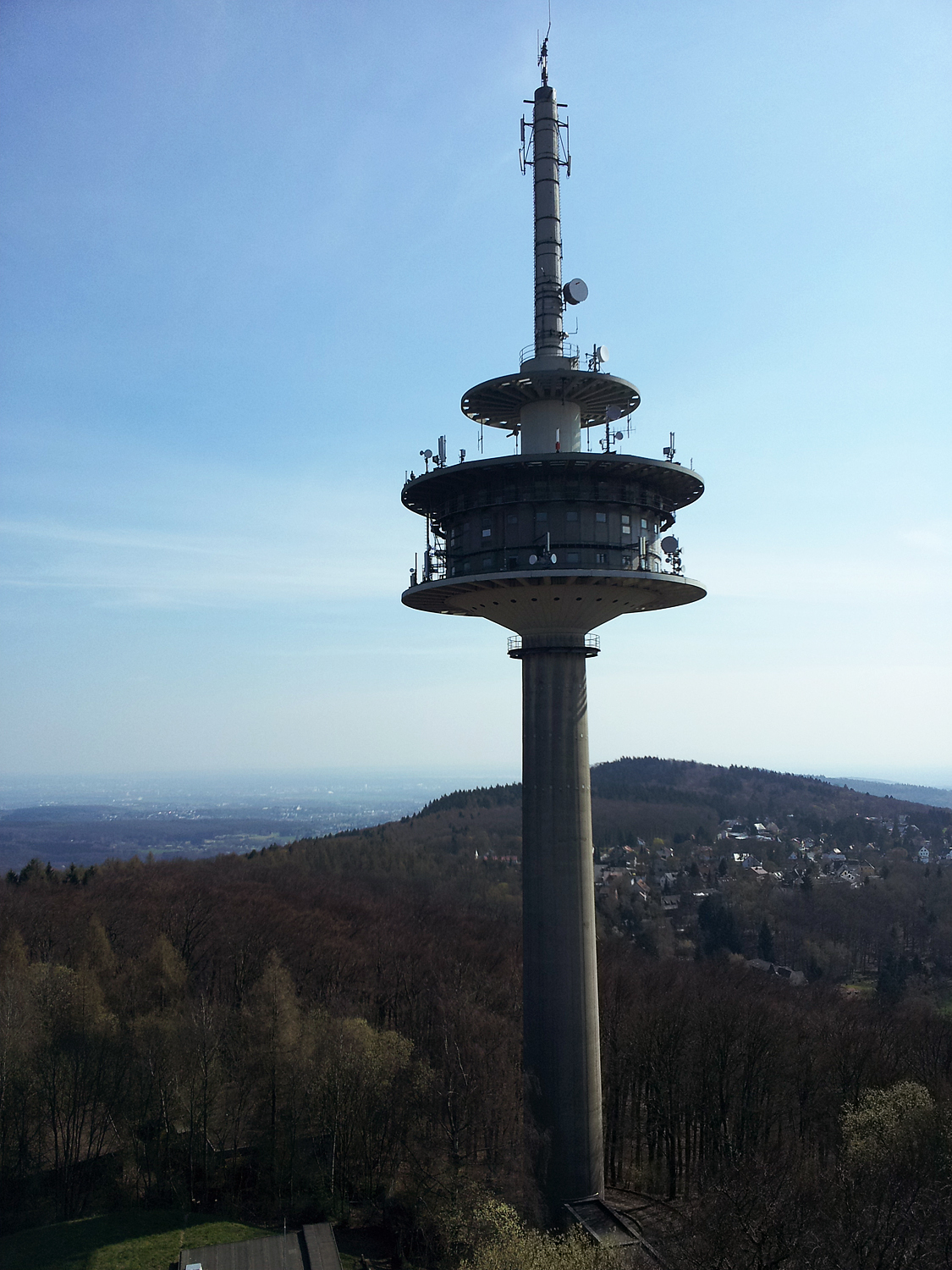
The Typenturm radio tower at Atzelberg mountain, with Rossert mountain in the back above the roofs of Kelkheim-Eppenhain

A Typenturm (German for standard tower) is a standardised telecommunications tower built of reinforced concrete the former German federal post office (now Deutsche Telekom AG).

Different types of tower were developed and built at different locations, like the series FMT 1 to FMT 16. The individual series differ in each case in the number of antenna platforms and the size of the operating projectile. The types FMT 7 to 10 are without pulpit. The type towers were usually designed on the basis of economic and functional criteria and only secondarily for aesthetics. Compared with structural steelworks, the reinforced concrete construction way is easier in the establishment and maintenance. In Germany there are about 300 towers of this type.

The establishment of these towers began in the mid-1960s, when the Federal Postal Administration developed its radio relay system clearly. In the planning of the type towers engineer Fritz Leonhardt and the architect Erwin Heinle were considerably involved.

Examples of type towers are among other things: Köterberg (FMT 1), Ober-Olm (FMT 1/72), Hüfingen (FMT 1/73), Karlsruhe-Grünwettersbach (FMT 2), Waldenbuch (FMT 2/72), Hoherodskopf (FMT 2/73), Hemmoor (FMT 2/81), Hunau (FMT 3), Bielefeld (FMT 3/72), Gramschatzer Wald (FMT 5), Cleebronn (FMT 6), Seesen (FMT 7), Heidenheim an der Brenz (FMT 8), Saarlouis (FMT 8/73), Landau (FMT 9), Lahr/Schwarzwald (FMT 10), Fehmarn (FMT 11), sending refuge (FMT 12), Moers (FMT 13), Blauen (FMT 14), Schöppingen (FMT 15), Hamburg-Bergedorf (FMT 16).

The communications towers in Münster, Kiel, Bremen and Cuxhaven were planned by an architect of the regional directorate Kiel and actually do not belong to this type of tower. They are therefore called Sondertürme, to which e.g. also the Rheinturm, the Heinrich-Hertz-Turm and the Fremersbergturm belong. In addition, the telecommunication tower Koblenz reminded strongly of the type towers FMT 11 to 13, is a special tower, since it is larger substantially more highly and the pulpit than with the type towers.

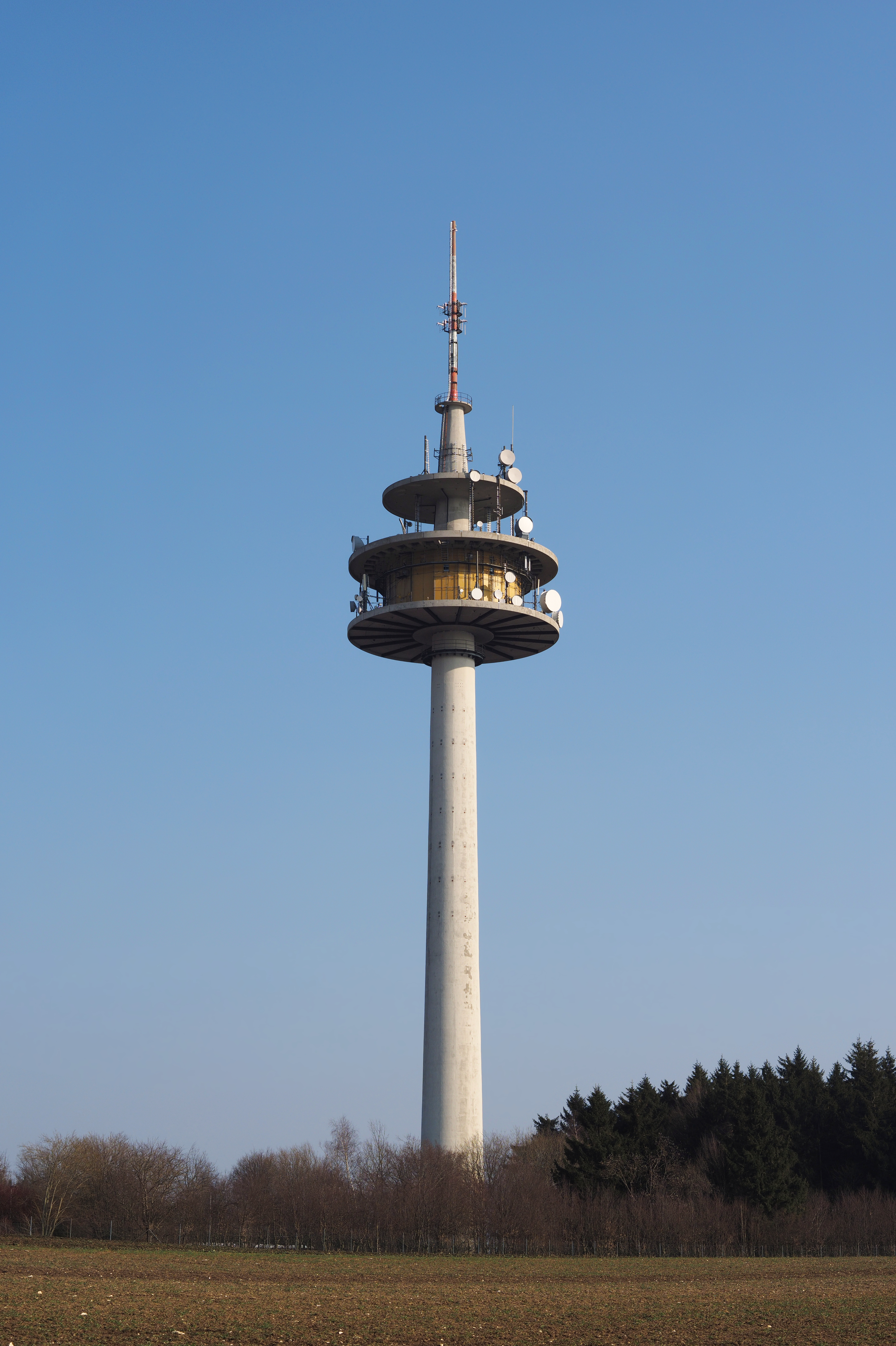
Schnittlingen communication tower

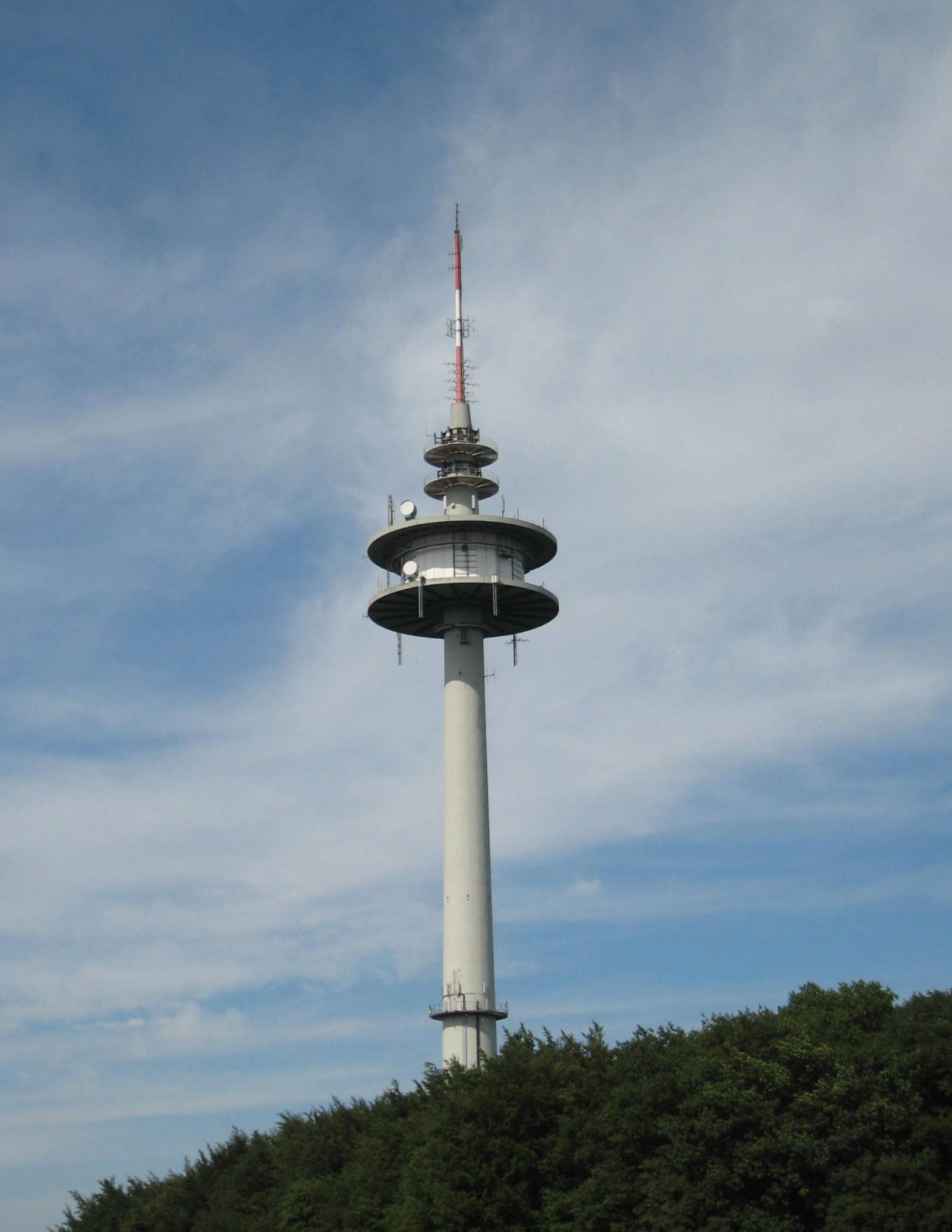
Schwerte communication tower

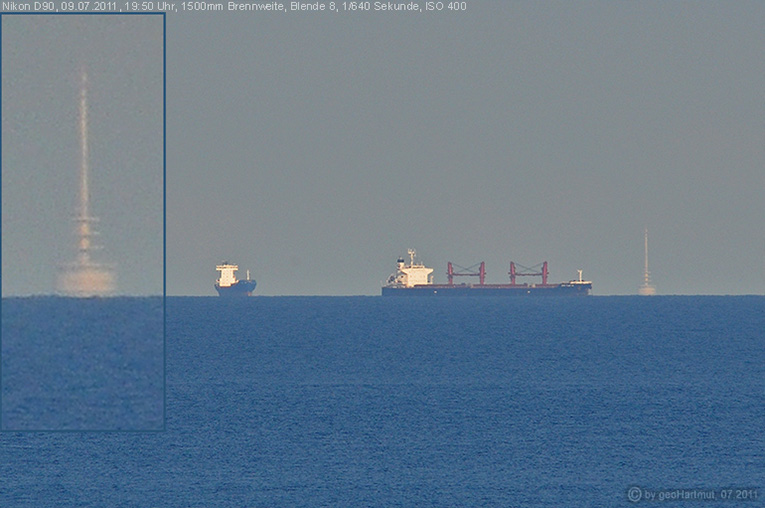
Friedrich clemens gerke tower

== See also ==
- A Tower
