= Fredelsloh Abbey =

Church building in Fredelsloh

Coordinates: 51°44′10″N 9°47′28″E

Fredelsloh Abbey is a former monastery in Fredelsloh, district Northeim, Germany.

== History ==
It was founded by Adalbert, archbishop of Mainz in 1132. At first, Augustinian Canons lived there, but by about 1145 a switch to a double monastery took place, so that from then on nuns lived there as well. As it lay in the northern boundary region of their territory, the bishops authorized the counts of Dassel to act as their vogts until 1277. Soon thereafter, the canons left the monastery.

It ceased to exist about one century after the Protestant Reformation, soon after the Thirty Years' War. The buildings were demolished with the exception of the church, which was used for crop storage until the Evangelical-Lutheran Church of Hanover resumed church service in the 20th century.

== Abbey church ==
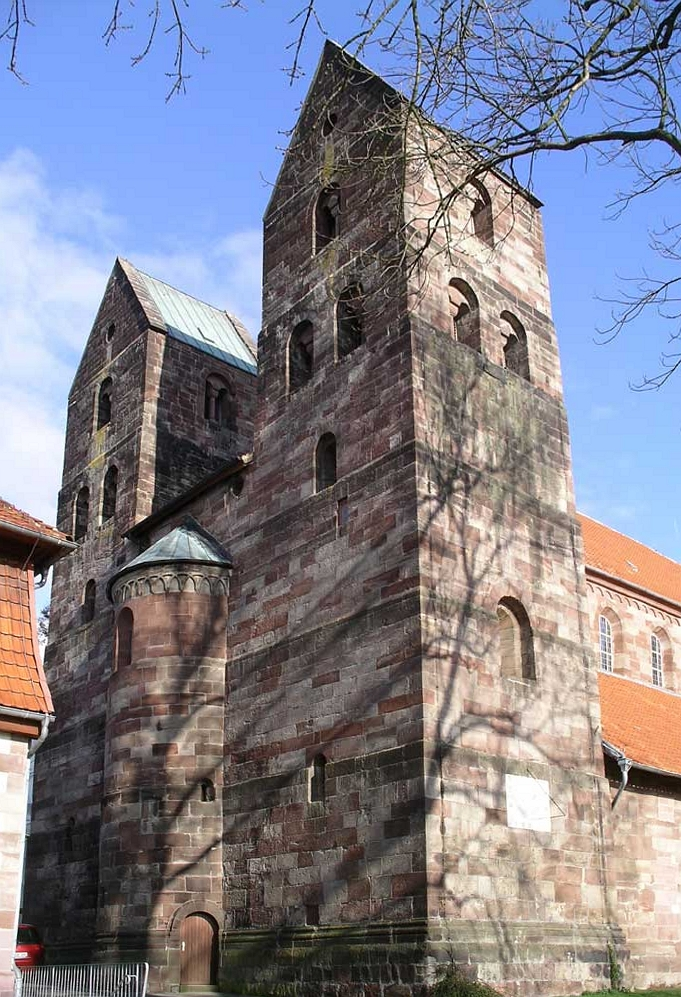
Fredelsloh church, view from southwest

The church is a well-preserved example of Romanesque architecture. It is a basilica with two towers, built of reddish ashlar sandstone. Right below the gable roof, lombard bands decorate the outer walls. The northern portal nowadays serves as entrance, its masonry arch dating back to the 1130s, thus one of the oldest true arches in Germany.

A unique double helix circular stairs is one of the architectural highlights but not publicly accessible due to a supporting wall that was built in the 17th century. These stairs are classified as 13th-century work, the builder most likely stemming from the Levant region. One of the counts of Dassel had participated in the Third Crusade.

Remarkable masonry reliefs of the apostles are placed in the choir.
