= Große Blöße =

Hill in Lower Saxony, Germany

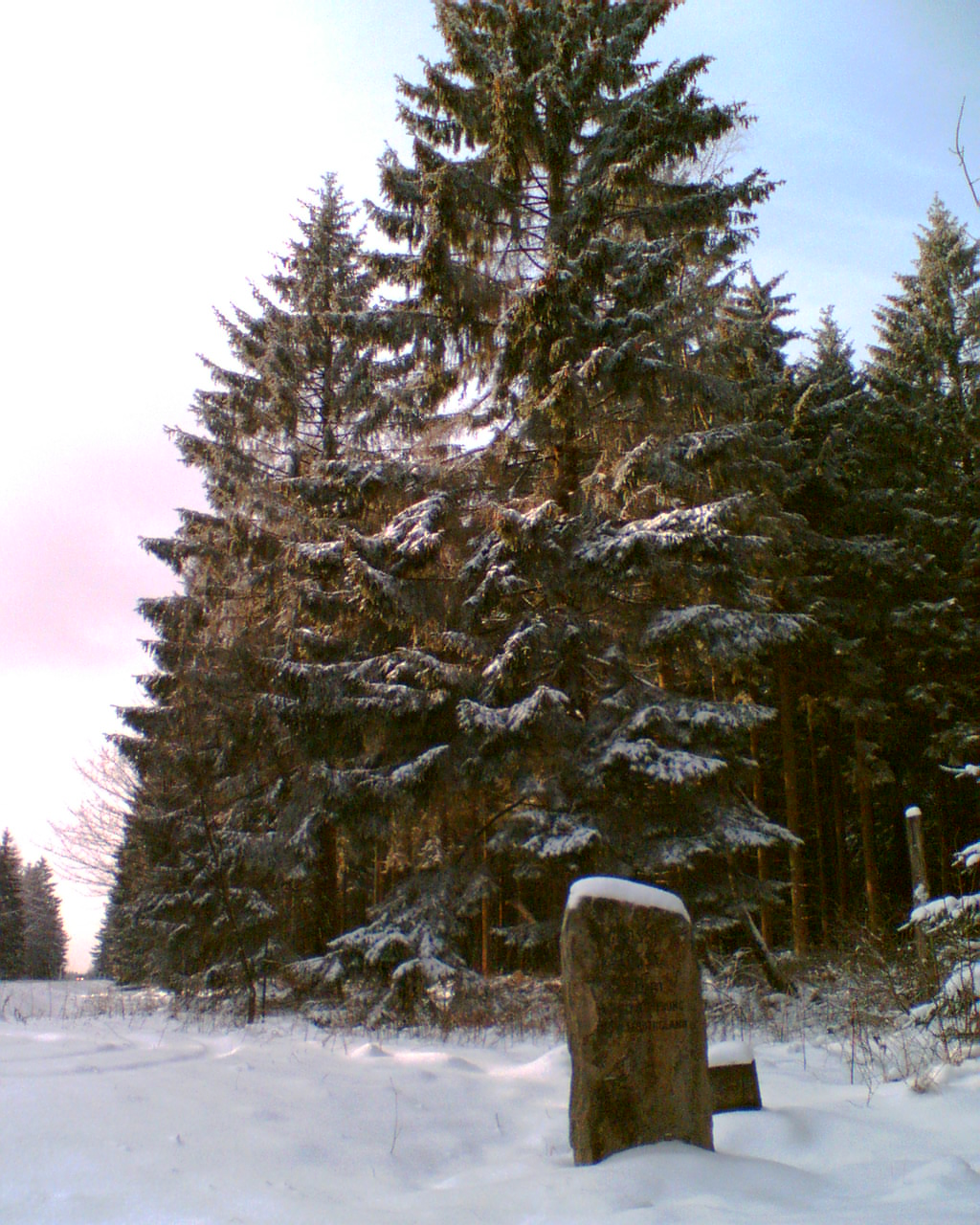
- Summit region

Highest point
- Elevation: 527.8 m above sea level (NN) (1,732 ft)
- Prominence: 333 m ↓ Erbsen
- Isolation: 44.8 km → Große Wulpke (Harz)
- Listing: highest point of the Solling
- Coordinates: 51°46′50″N 9°35′32″E

Geography
- Location within Lower Saxony
- Location: Northeim, Lower Saxony, Germany
- Parent range: Solling, Weser Upland

At 527.8 m (1,732 ft) above sea level, the Große Blöße is the highest hill in the Solling-Vogler Nature Park, the Solling and the Weser Uplands (Lower Saxony, Germany).

Despite its name (literal translation: 'large bareness' or 'large opening'), the summit is forested.

== Geographical location ==
The thickly forested hill is located about 7 km (4 mi) (as the crow flies) southwest of Dassel between the villages of Hellental to the north and Silberborn to the south. It rises on the southeastern flank of the Helle Rift Valley (Hellentaler Graben), through which the River Helle flows. On the far, northwestern, side of this graben is the Großer Ahrensberg, the second highest hill in the Solling range.

== Summit area ==
The L 549 country road runs just past the unassuming summit of the Große Blöße through dense woods. The road runs from Dassel via Silberborn and Neuhaus to Boffzen.

== Photographs ==
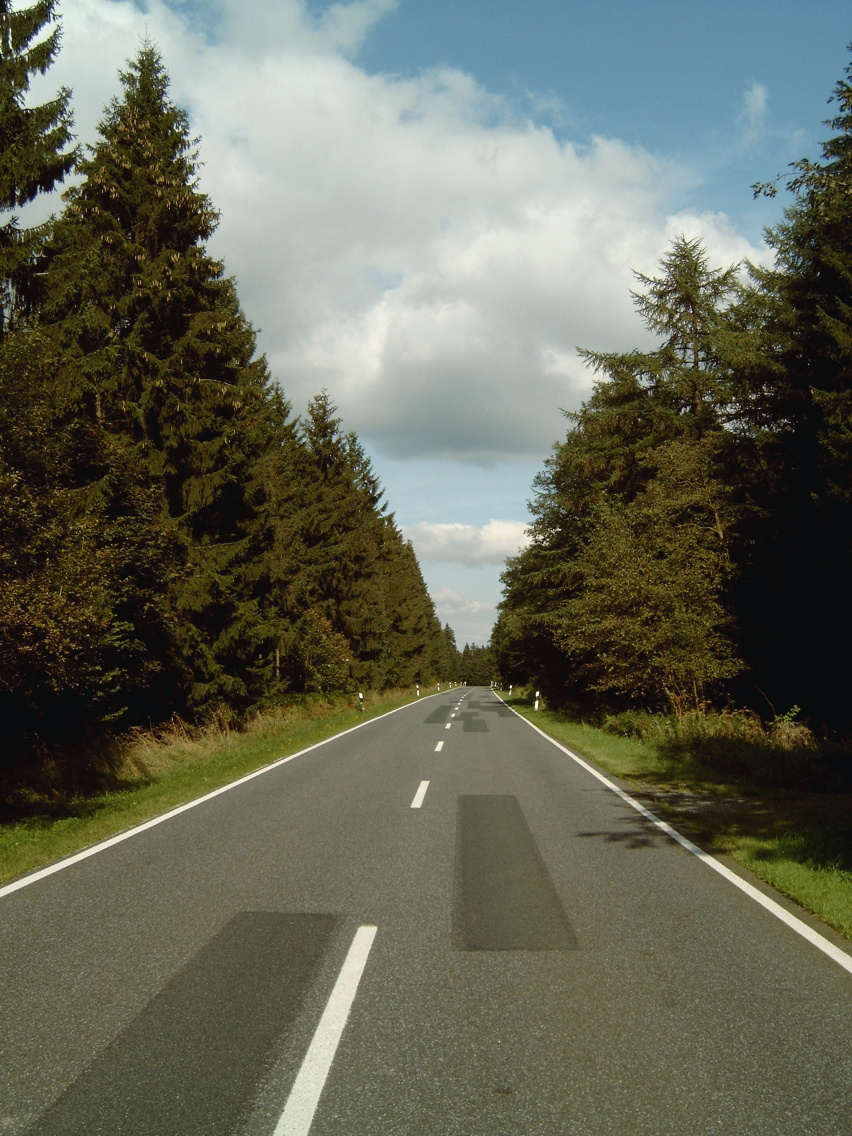
The L 549 near the summit, view looking east (towards Dassel)

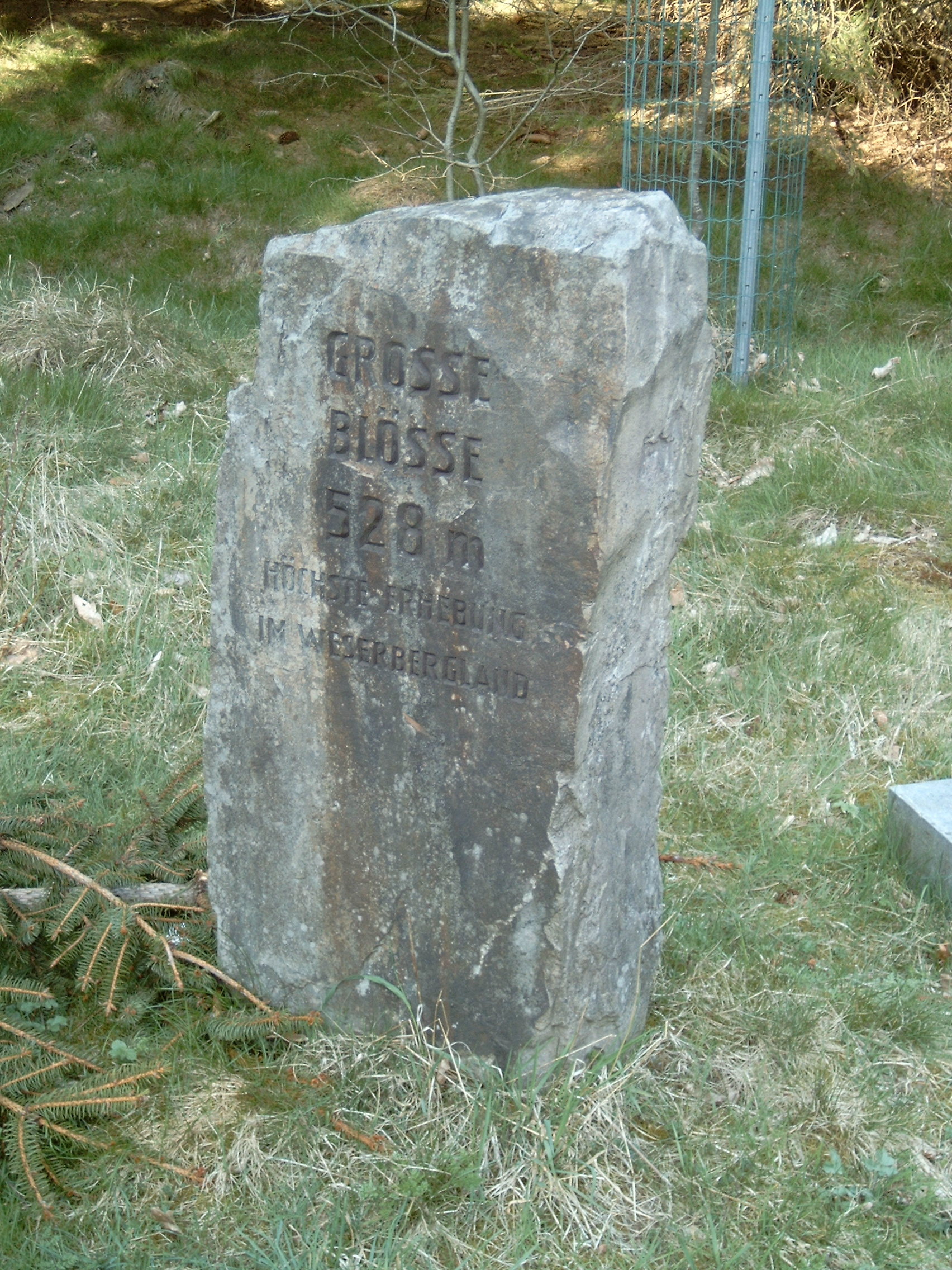
Stone near the L 549 in the summit area
