= Espolde =

River in Germany

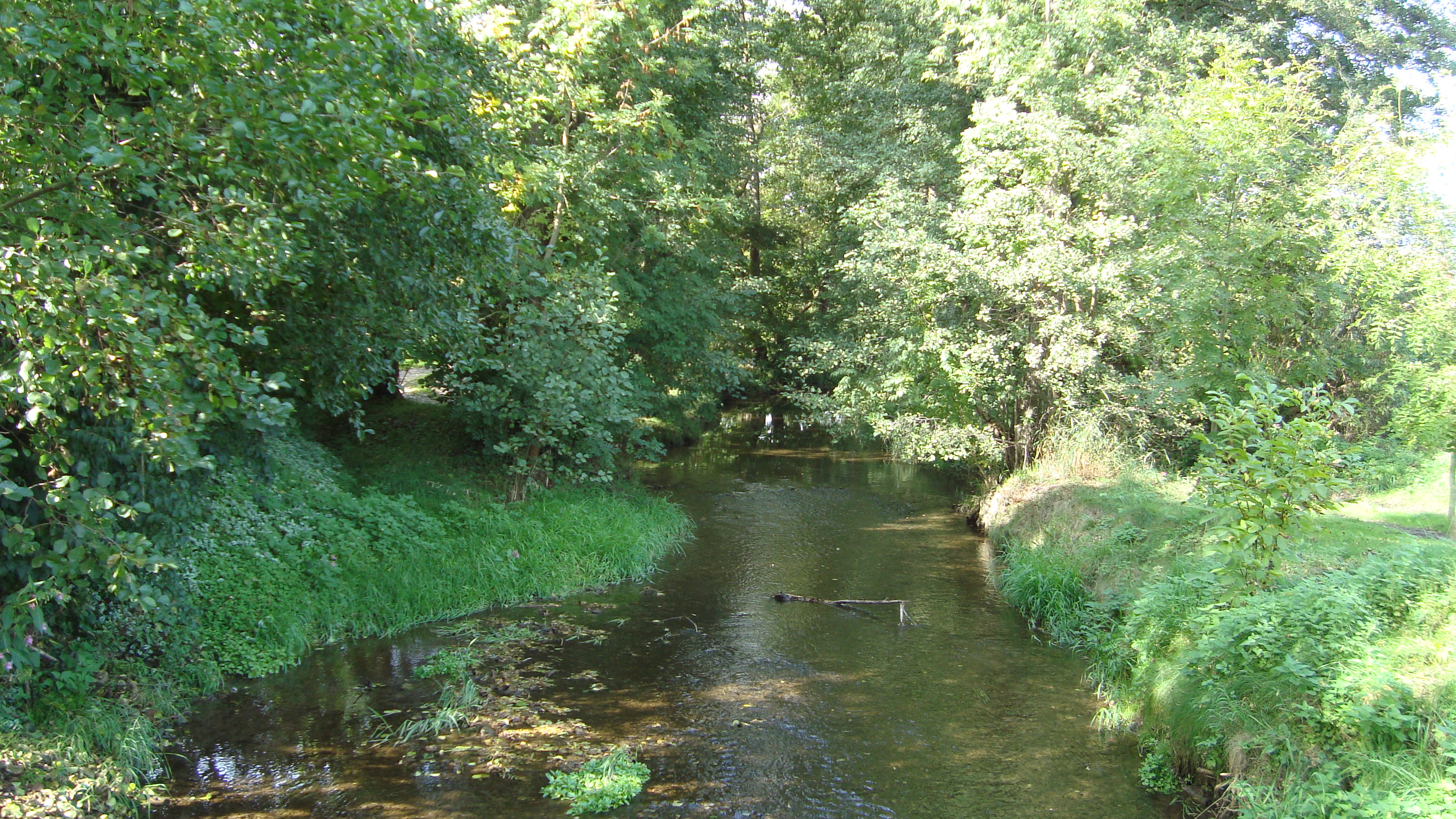

Location
- Country: Germany
- State: Lower Saxony

Physical characteristics
- Mouth
  - location: Leine
  - coordinates: 51.6266°N 9.9263°E
- Length: 16.1 km (10.0 mi)

Basin features
- Progression: Leine→ Aller→ Weser→ North Sea

Espolde is a river of Lower Saxony, Germany. It flows into the Leine near Nörten-Hardenberg.

The Espolde springs in the eastern foothills of the mountain range Solling. Its source is located just north of the village Espol (part of Hardegsen) at about 311 m above sea level (NN).

== See also ==
- List of rivers of Lower Saxony
