= Dieße =

River in Germany

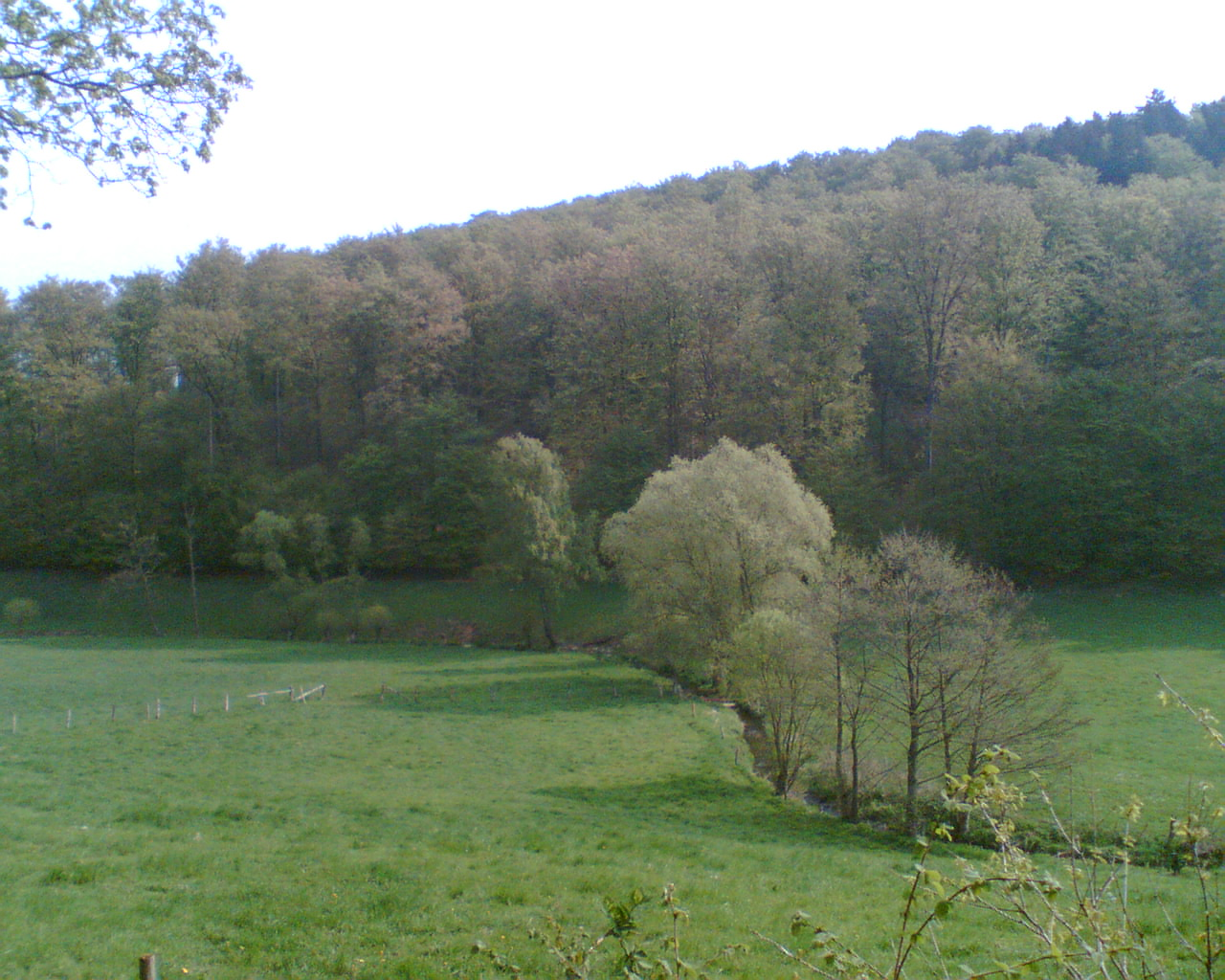
- Valley of the Dieße south of Lauenberg

Location
- Country: Germany
- State: Lower Saxony

Physical characteristics
- Mouth
  - location: Ilme
  - coordinates: 51.8166°N 9.8076°E
- Length: 14.5 km (9.0 mi)

Basin features
- Progression: Ilme→ Leine→ Aller→ Weser→ North Sea

Dieße is a river of Lower Saxony, Germany. It passes Ahlsburg and Ellensen Forest.

== See also ==
- List of rivers of Lower Saxony
