= Lutterbeck =

- Part of Moringen
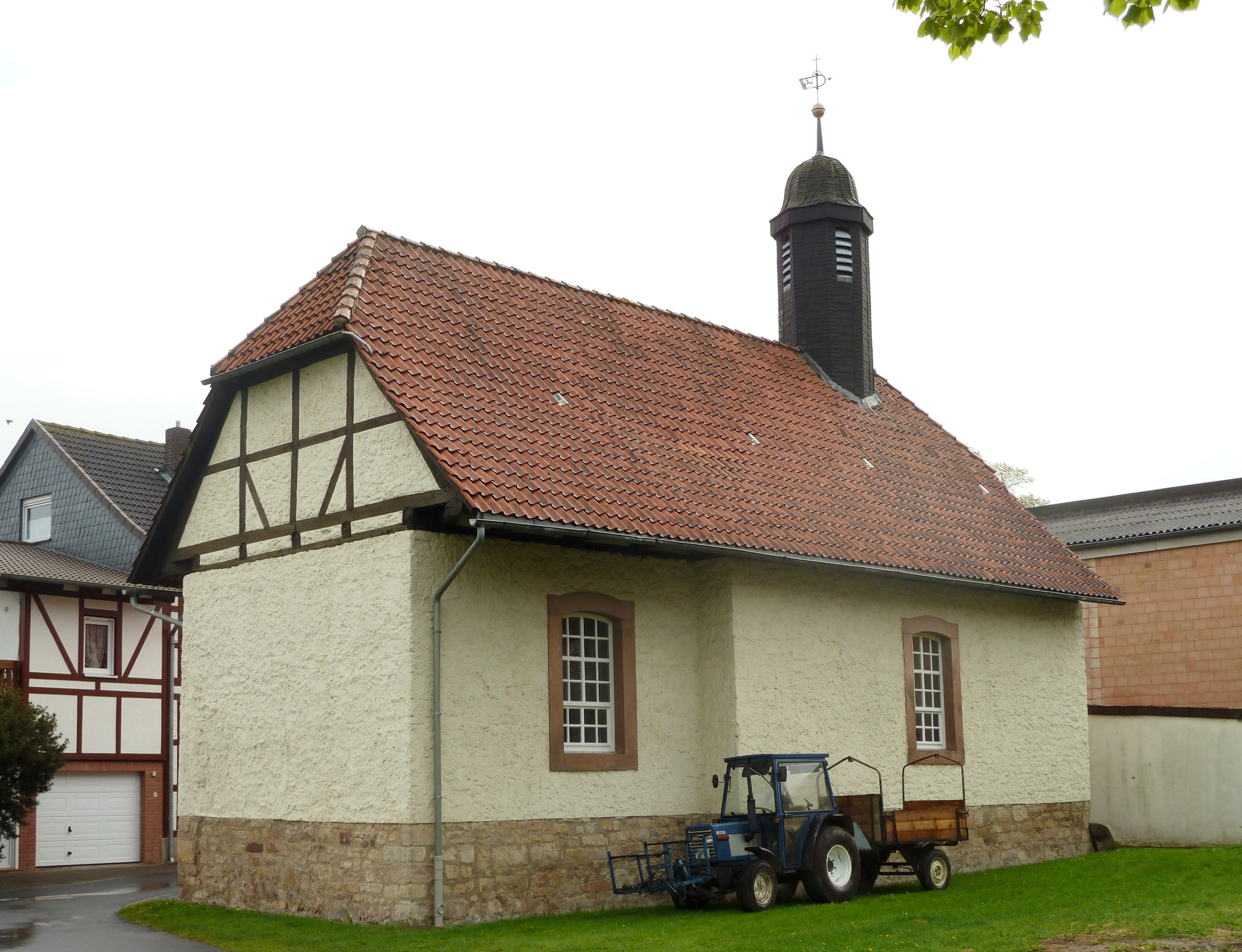
- St. George's chapel

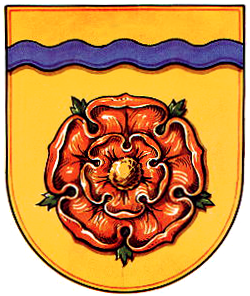
- Coat of arms

- Location of Lutterbeck within Moringen
- Interactive map of Lutterbeck
- Location within Germany Location within Lower Saxony
- Coordinates: 51°42′N 9°50′E
- Country: Germany
- State: Lower Saxony
- District: Northeim
- City: Moringen

Population (January 2024)
  - Total: 167
- Time zone: UTC+01:00 (CET)
  - Summer (DST): UTC+02:00 (CEST)
- Dialling codes: 05554

Lutterbeck is a small community about 4 km north of Moringen's center in Lower Saxony, Germany. Its history goes back to at least AD 1100, though it was totally destroyed in 1490 and rebuilt shortly after 1500. Lutterbeck's damaged chapel was completely torn down and rebuilt in 1736. In 1974, it was incorporated into the Moringen district. Today, there are 167 residents.
