= Großer Ahrensberg =

Hill in Lower Saxony, Germany

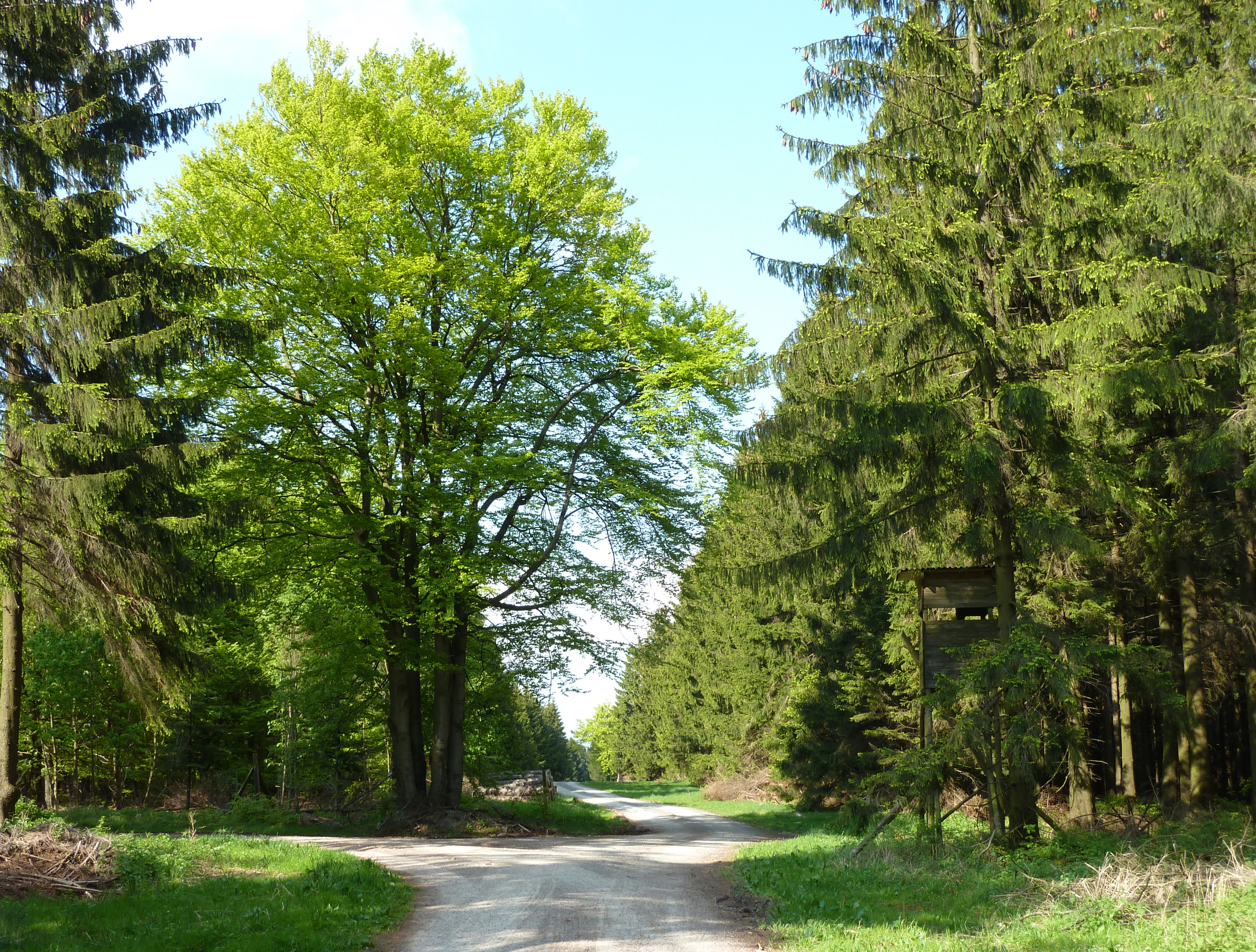
- Summit area of the Großer Ahrensberg

Highest point
- Elevation: 524.9 m above sea level (NN) (1,722 ft)
- Coordinates: 51°48′04″N 9°34′52″E

Geography
- Location within Lower Saxony
- Location: Lower Saxony, Germany
- Parent range: Solling, Weser Uplands

At 524.9 m above sea level (NN) the Großer Ahrensberg is one of the highest hills in the Solling range, which is located in southern Lower Saxony in Germany.

This densely wooded hill lies about 7 kilometres (4.3 mi) as the crow flies west-southwest of Dassel between the villages of Hellental and Schießhaus to the north and Silberborn to the south. It is located on the western flanks of the Hellental Graben, through which the river Helle flows, and is surrounded by the Solling-Vogler Nature Park. On the far (south-southeast) side of this graben is the Große Blöße.

The region of the Großer Ahrensberg belongs to the Hoher Solling climatic zone above 400 m, which has high levels of precipitation and low temperatures. These climatic conditions are e.g. still provide a sufficiently healthy environment for beech woods.

Several forest tracks and footpaths meet at the very top of the Großer Ahrensberg.
