= Ilme =

River in Germany

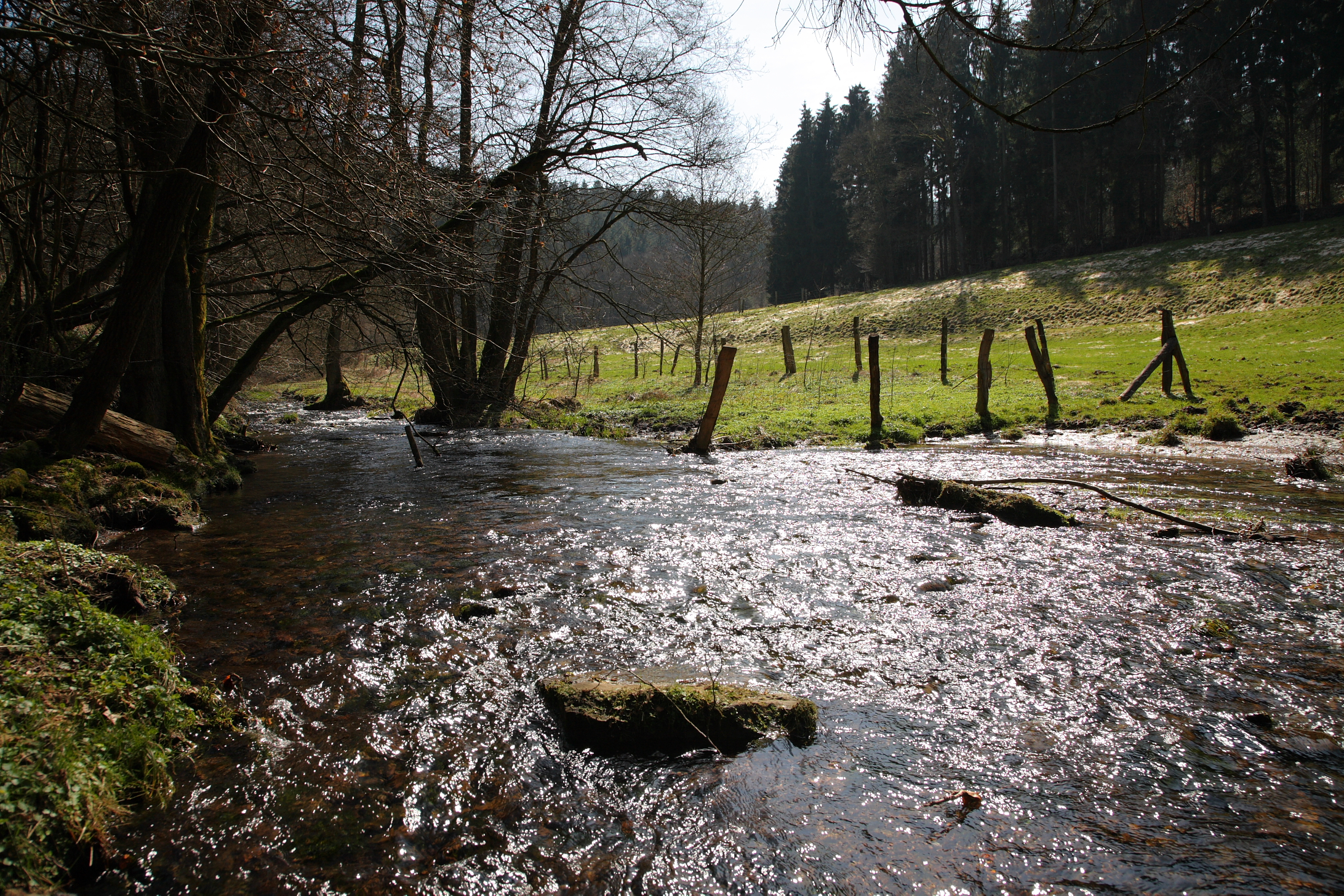
- Ilme in the Solling-Vogler Nature Park along the L548 (Sievershausen - Abbecke)

Location
- Country: Germany
- State: Lower Saxony

Physical characteristics
- Source
  - location: In the Solling, by the L 548 between Uslar and Dassel
  - coordinates: 51°43′16″N 9°37′00″E
  - elevation: 340 m above sea level (NN)
- Mouth
  - location: East of Einbeck into the Leine
  - coordinates: 51°48′54″N 9°55′30″E
  - elevation: 105 m above sea level (NN)
- Length: 33.0 km (20.5 mi)
- Basin size: 393 km^{2} (152 sq mi)

Basin features
- Progression: Leine→ Aller→ Weser→ North Sea
- Landmarks: Large towns: Einbeck; Small towns: Dassel; Villages: Relliehausen, Ellensen, Markoldendorf, Hullersen,
- Tributaries
  - left: Abbecker Bach, Repkebach, Schlingenbach, Spüligbach, Bewer, Krummes Wasser
  - right: Wolfsbach, Hülsebach, Lummerke, Riepenbach, Dieße, Rotte, Rebbe

The Ilme is a left-bank, western tributary of the River Leine in Lower Saxony, Germany. It is 33.0 km (20.5 mi) long.

The river begins at the pond Neuer Teich in the centre of the Solling hills at an elevation of 340 m above sea level (NN) and flows initially northwards to Dassel, then in an easterly direction through Markoldendorf (a district of Dassel) to Einbeck, after which it discharges into the Leine near Volksen at an elevation of 105 m (344 ft).

== See also ==
- List of rivers of Lower Saxony
