= Moringen =

- Town
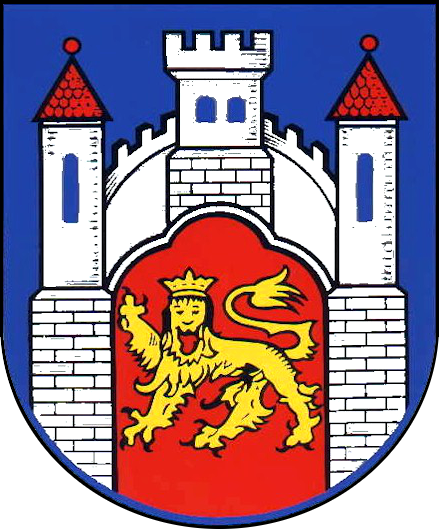
- Coat of arms

- Location of Moringen within Northeim district
- Interactive map of Moringen
- Location within Germany Location within Lower Saxony
- Coordinates: 51°42′N 9°52′E
- Country: Germany
- State: Lower Saxony
- District: Northeim
- Subdivisions: 9 districts

Government
  - Mayor (2021–26): Heike Müller-Otte (Ind.)

Area
  - Total: 82.39 km^{2} (31.81 sq mi)
- Elevation: 137–457 m (449–1,499 ft)

Population (2025-12-31)
  - Total: 6,517
  - Density: 79.10/km^{2} (204.9/sq mi)
- Time zone: UTC+01:00 (CET)
  - Summer (DST): UTC+02:00 (CEST)
- Postal codes: 37186
- Dialling codes: 05554
- Vehicle registration: NOM
- Website: www.moringen.de

Moringen (German pronunciation: [ˈmoːʁɪŋən]) is a town in the district Northeim, in the southern part of Lower Saxony, Germany. The town consists of the center Town and eight surrounding villages, Fredelsloh being one of them.

== History ==
The town and its villages were founded over a thousand years ago.

It is the seat of a psychiatric hospital, founded in late 19th century. During World War II the hospital was emptied and used by the Nazis as the Moringen concentration camp. Today it is again a psychiatric hospital.

== Economy ==
Among the larger firms operating in the community is Piller, a maker of industrial fans. The Northeim district's major waste landfill is in Moringen.

== Museum ==
- house KZ Gedenkstätte
- historic gas holder.

== Literature ==
- The Women's Camp in Moringen: A Memoir of Imprisonment in Nazi Germany 1936–1937

by Gabriele Herz (Author), Jane Caplan (Editor), Hildegard Herz (Translator), Howard Hartig (Translator). Berghahn Books (15 Nov 2005). ISBN 1-84545-077-9; ISBN 978-1-84545-077-9.

== See also ==
- Lutterbeck
