= Solling-Vogler Nature Park =

Nature park in Germany

Coordinates: 51.76°N 9.55°E

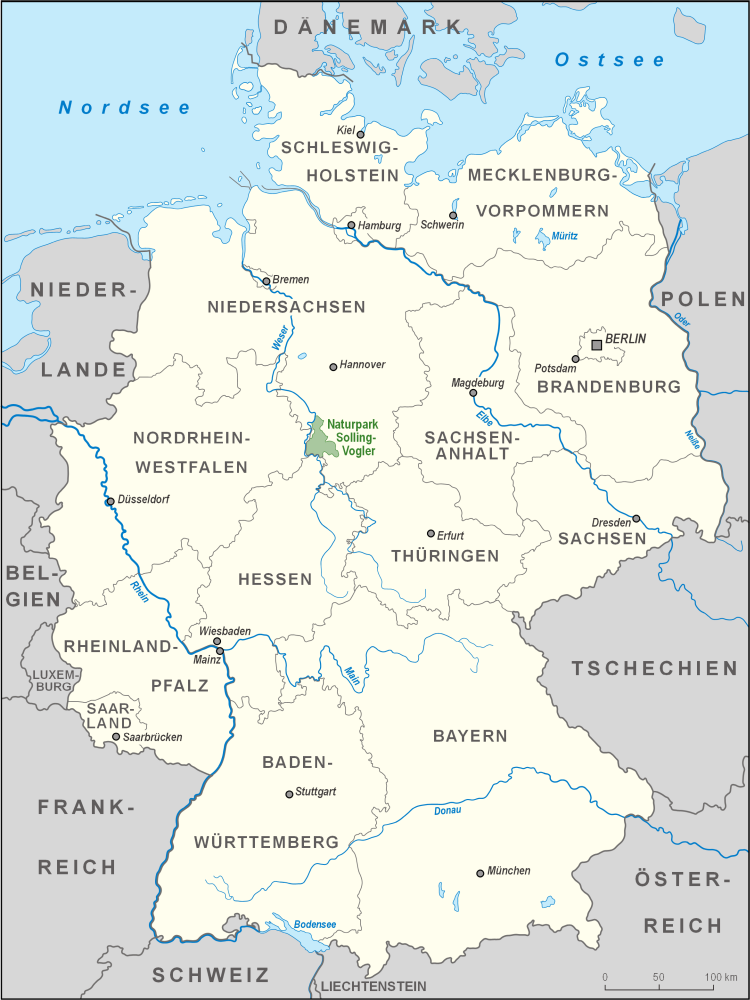
Location of the Solling-Vogler Nature Park

The Solling-Vogler Nature Park (German: Naturpark Solling-Vogler) is a nature park in South Lower Saxony in Germany. It has an area of 52,000 hectares (200 sq mi) and was established in 1966.

The nature park includes the hill ranges of the Solling and the Vogler but also the Burgberg which lies east of Weser valley between the two upland regions. It is looked after by the Zweckverband Naturpark Solling-Vogler, whose sponsors are the districts of Holzminden and Northeim and the state of Lower Saxony.

== Geography ==
The Solling-Vogler Nature Park lies northwest of the city of Göttingen in the two aforementioned districts between the rivers Weser in the west and Leine in the east. It is located between the villages of Bodenwerder to the north, Stadtoldendorf and Dassel to the northeast, Moringen to the east Hardegsen and Uslar to the southeast, Bad Karlshafen to the south, Beverungen to the southwest, Höxter to the west and Holzminden to the northwest.

The nature park lies between its neighbours, the Weser Uplands-Schaumburg-Hamelin Nature Park to the north, the Münden Nature Park to the south, the Harz National Park to the east and the Eggegebirge and Southern Teutoburg Forest Nature Park to the west.

The Bunter sandstone ridge of the Solling (up to 528 m AMSL) has the appearance of a high plateau with mixed forests, wet meadows and moors. The Vogler (460 m) is also a sandstone upland, but with many hills and valleys with steep rock faces.

== Flora and fauna ==
The Solling-Vogler Nature Park comprises 106 ha (260 acres) old oak wood pasture, 33 ha (82 acres) European spruce–larch mixed forest stands, about 6 ha (15 acres) former grazing and farmland, and some streams and brooks surrounded by riparian forest. Several species have been recorded that are endangered on the national Red List, including several Lichenes, ceramic fungus (Xylobolus frustulatus), stag beetle (Lucanus cervus) and darkling beetle (Corticeus fasciatus). Bird species recorded include middle spotted woodpecker (Dendrocopos medius). Exmoor ponies and heck cattle have been released in 2000 to maintain the park's ecosystem.

Elements of the nature park enjoy the additional protected status of the EU Birds Directive. The designated areas are habitats for the Tengmalm's owl, black stork and other protected bird species.

== Sights ==
The abbeys of Amelungsborn and Corvey as well as Bevern Castle are outstanding historic buildings and are all located within the nature park. In Fürstenberg there is an old porcelain works. Between Silberborn and Neuhaus is the Hochsolling Observation Tower. Close to the tower is the nature reserve of Hochmoor Mecklenbruch near Silberborn and the Neuhaus Deer Park (see external links), with its forest museum, near Neuhaus.

The Weser Cycle Path runs west of the nature park along the Weser, as do the tourist routes of the German Fairy Tale Route, German Timber-Frame Road and the Road of Weser Renaissance.

== See also ==
- List of nature parks in Germany
