= Fredelsloh =

Coordinates: 51°45′N 9°48′E

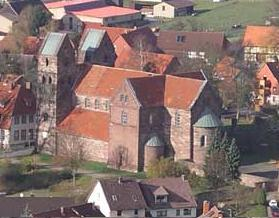
The former double monastery at Fredesloh

Fredelsloh (German pronunciation: [ˈfʁeːdl̩sloː]) is a village in Lower Saxony in Germany close to the town of Northeim. The town is historically agricultural, but today derives much income from its traditional pottery shops. The village is centred on a very large church, Klosterkirche Fredelsloh, which was formerly a mediaeval nunnery. The von Ohlen family historically owned much of the land in and around the village, and still has a strong presence in the area.
