= Leine =

River in Germany

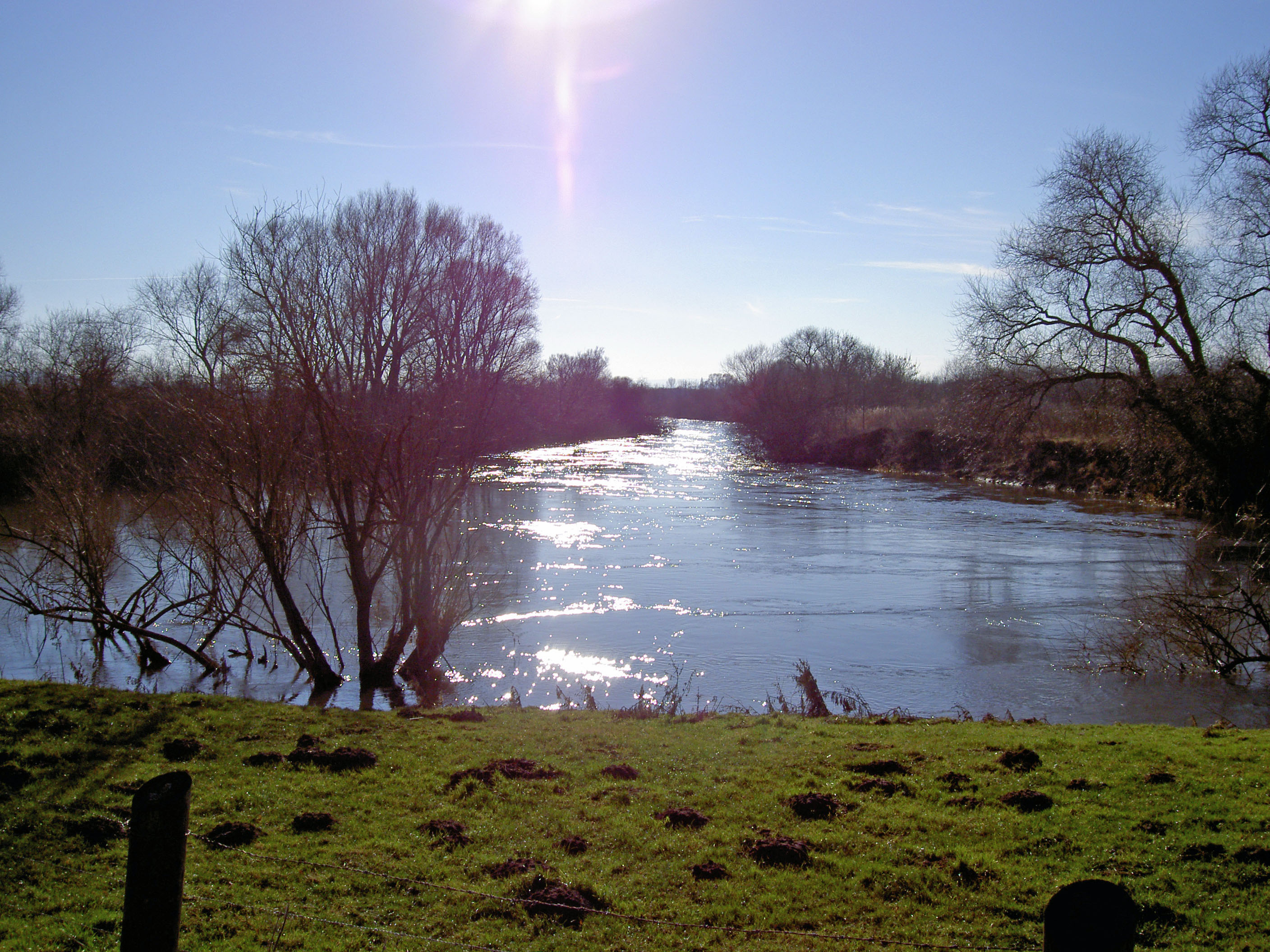
- The Leine near Sarstedt-Ruthe

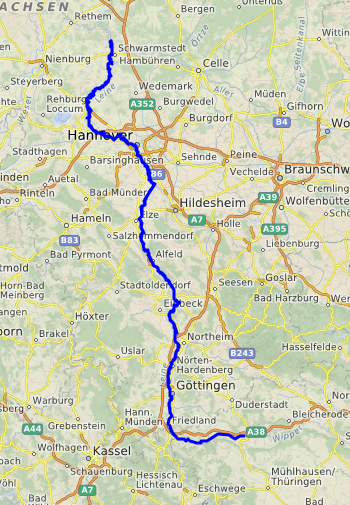
- Course of the Leine

Location
- Country: Germany
- States: Thuringia and Lower Saxony
- Reference no.: DE: 488

Physical characteristics
- Source
  - location: In Leinefelde in the Eichsfeld
  - elevation: 340 m above sea level (NN)
- Mouth
  - location: Near Schwarmstedt into the Aller at km 52.26
  - coordinates: 52°43′22″N 9°35′38″E
  - elevation: 25 m above sea level (NN)
- Length: 281 km (175 mi)
- Basin size: 6,517 km^{2} (2,516 sq mi)
- Discharge
  - location: at Göttingen gauge
  - average: 5.3 m^{3}/s (190 cu ft/s)
- Discharge
  - location: Greene
  - average: 32.0 m^{3}/s (1,130 cu ft/s)
- Discharge
  - location: Herrenhausen
  - average: 52.3 m^{3}/s (1,850 cu ft/s)
- Discharge
  - location: Schwarmstedt
  - average: 61.7 m^{3}/s (2,180 cu ft/s)

Basin features
- Progression: Aller→ Weser→ North Sea
- Landmarks: Cities: Göttingen, Hanover; Large towns: Leinefelde, Northeim, Einbeck, Freden, Alfeld, Laatzen, Seelze, Garbsen, Neustadt am Rübenberge; Small towns: Heilbad Heiligenstadt, Gronau, Elze, Pattensen; Villages: Freden, Burgstemmen, Bordenau, Bothmer
- Tributaries
  - left: Espolde, Ilme, Saale, Haller, Westaue
  - right: Garte, Rhume, Aue, Gande, Innerste, Auter

The Leine (German: [ˈlaɪnə]; Old Saxon Lagina) is a river in Thuringia and Lower Saxony, Germany. It is a left-bank tributary of the Aller and the Weser and is 281 km (175 mi) long.

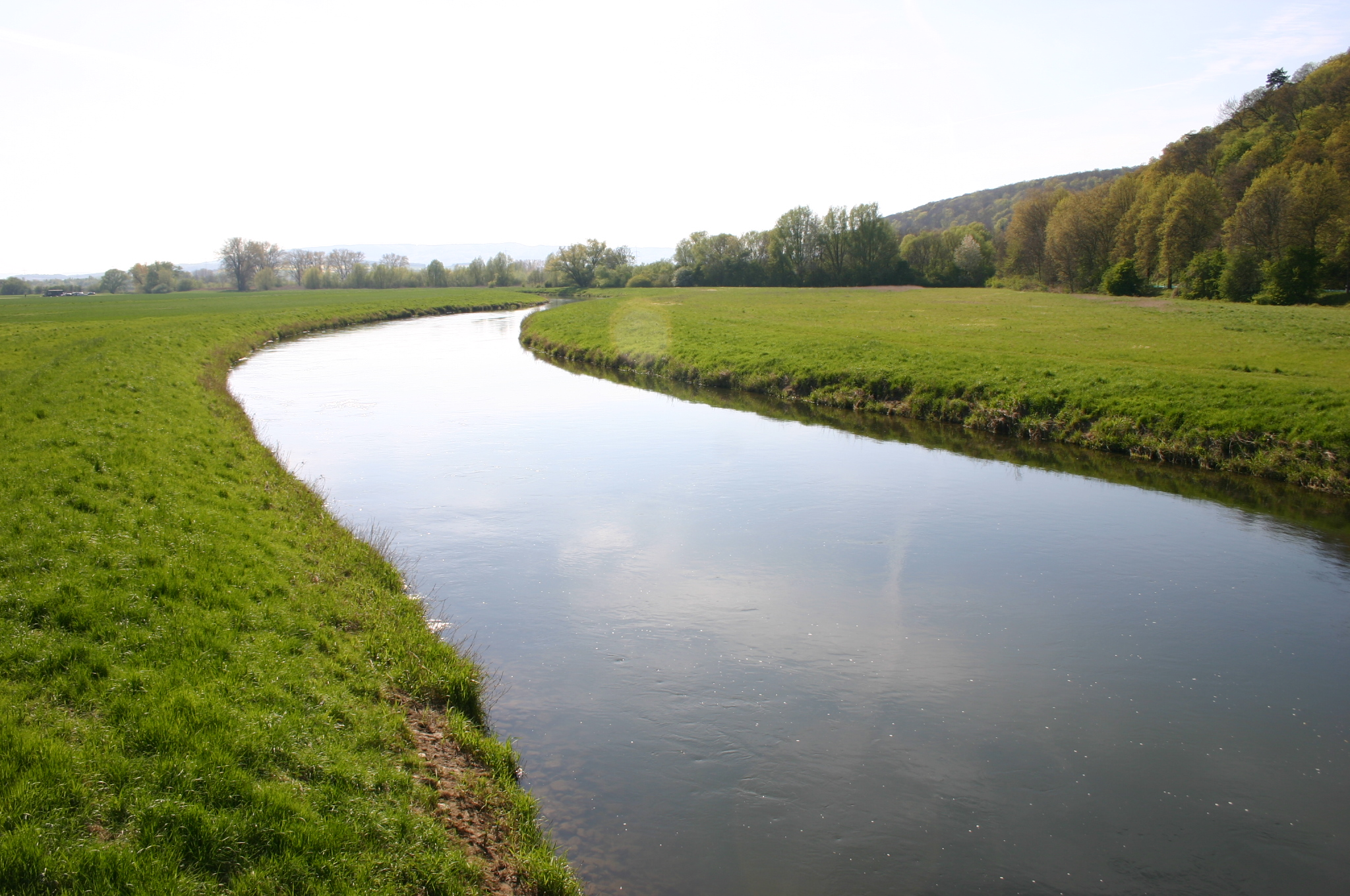
Leine near Nordstemmen

The river's source is located close to the town of Leinefelde in Thuringia. About 40 km (25 mi) downriver, the river enters Lower Saxony and runs northwards.

Important towns along its course, from upstream to downstream, are Göttingen, Einbeck, Freden, Alfeld, and Gronau, before the river enters Hanover, the largest city on its banks. Downstream some 40 km (25 mi) north of Hanover, near Schwarmstedt, the river joins the Aller and reaches the North Sea via the Weser. Its northern (lower) reaches are only navigable today by the smallest commercial carriers, though in the past, it served as an important pre-railway barge transport artery as far upriver as Göttingen.

The river is somewhat polluted by industry, so the water is not used for drinking, but the pollution has never been severe enough to prevent fish from living in it. Like many West German rivers since the 1960s, it has enjoyed increasingly cleaner waters since the implementation of environmental controls. Sport fishing is enjoyed from small boats and along the banks, although yields are normally low.

At least one point of the river (Göttingen) is partially diverted into a canal that runs more or less parallel to the river.

Serial killer Fritz Haarmann disposed of most of his victims' remains in the Leine river.

== In fiction ==
In his 1986 bestseller Red Storm Rising, author Tom Clancy uses the Leine as a major obstacle to the Soviet Union's Red Army drive to the Rhine and the North Sea ports of the Netherlands and Belgium through West Germany. In reality, the river is a rather minor one, and, for most of its length, is quite narrow with a small flow volume. As such, it would not provide a significant barrier to an advancing army.

== See also ==
- List of rivers of Thuringia
- List of rivers of Lower Saxony
