= Solling =

Mountain range

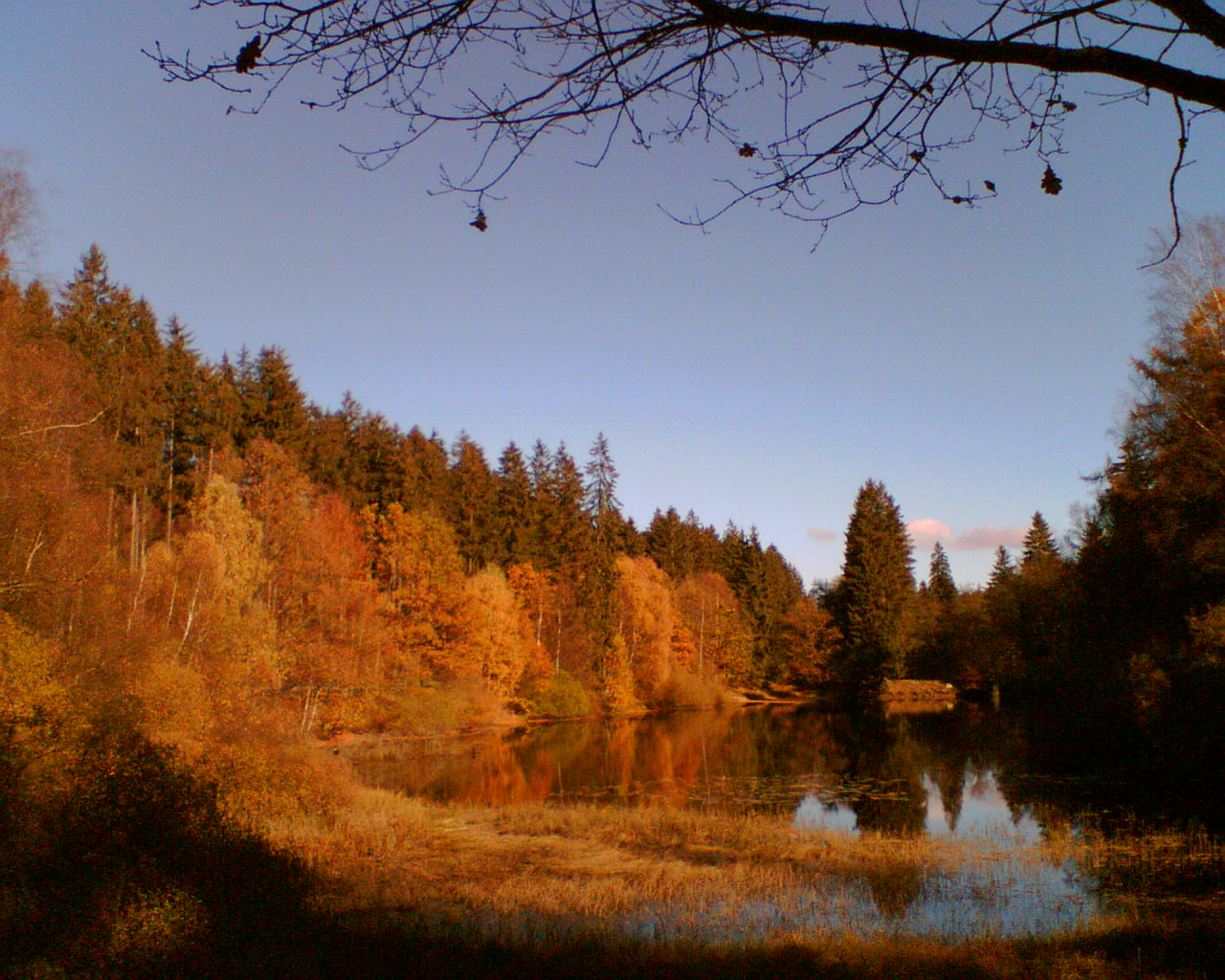
- The Neuer Teich in the Solling

Highest point
- Peak: Große Blöße
- Elevation: 527.8 m (1,732 ft)
- Coordinates: 51°46′50″N 9°35′32″E

Geography
- Location of the Solling in Northeim district
- Country: Germany
- Region: Lower Saxony
- Range coordinates: 51°44′N 9°36′E

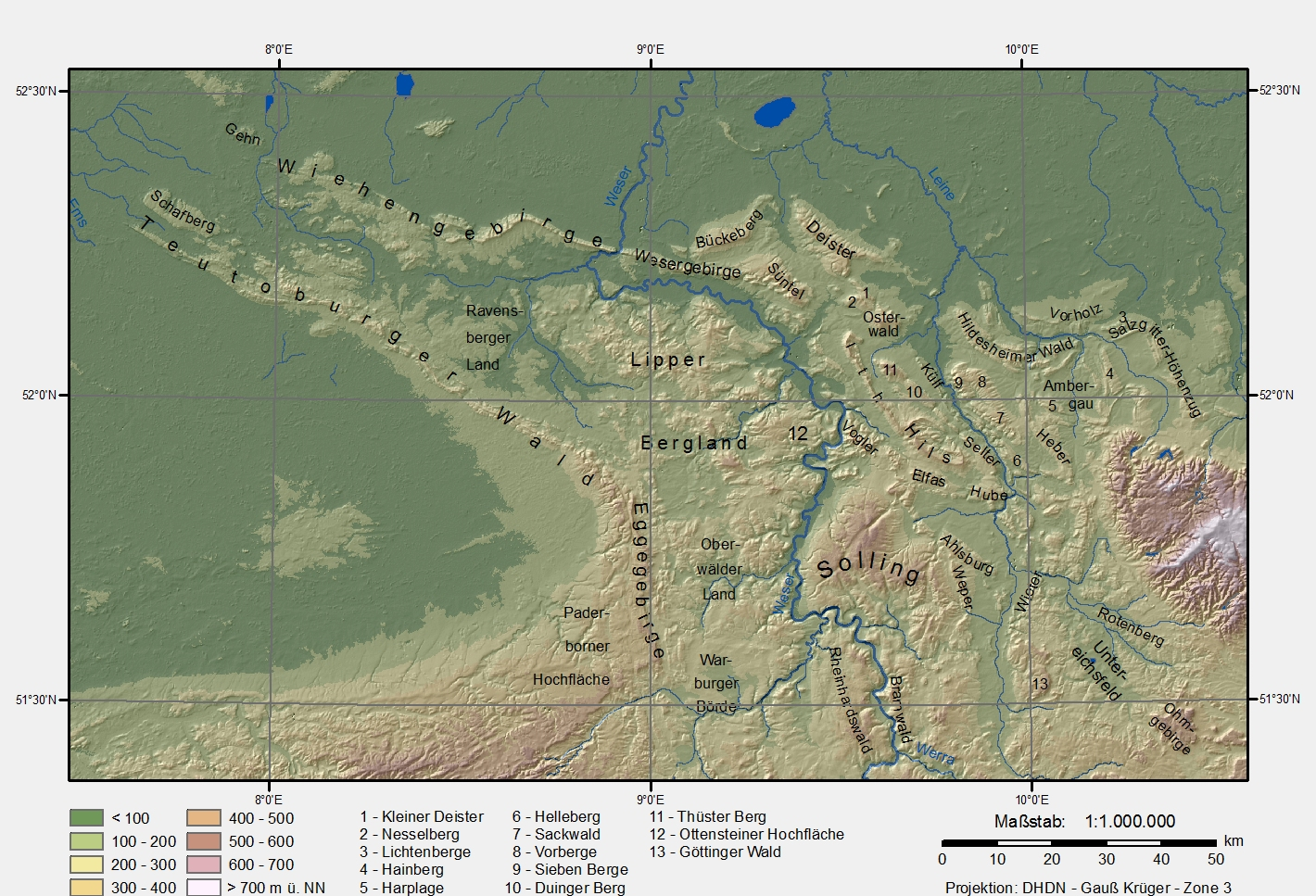
Lower Saxon Hills

The Solling (German pronunciation: [ˈzɔlɪŋ]) is a range of hills up to 527.8 m above sea level (NN) high in the Weser Uplands in the German state of Lower Saxony, whose extreme southerly foothills extend into Hesse and North Rhine-Westphalia.

Inside Lower Saxony it is the second largest range of hills and the third highest after the Harz (Wurmberg; 971 m) and the Kaufungen Forest (Haferberg; 581 m).

The Solling is a cultural landscape consisting mainly of spruce and beech forests. Oak also grows in some areas. The Solling forest is home of a number of animals and birds, for example red deer or chaffinch. They can best be observed in the Neuhaus wildlife park.

Together with the smaller and lower Vogler range and the little Burgberg to the north, the Solling is part of the Solling-Vogler Nature Park.

== Hills ==
The main hills in the Solling include the following (heights given in m above Normalnull):

- Große Blöße (527.8 m)
- Großer Ahrensberg (524.9 m)
- Moosberg (513.0 m) – with Hochsolling observation tower
- Vogelherd (c. 505 m)
- Dreiberg (493.5 m)
- Großer Steinberg (493 m) – with "Harzblick" observation tower
- Tünnekenbornstrang (490.1 m)
- Langenberg (484.6 m)
- Bärenkopf (473.0 m)
- Wolfsstrang (468.7 m) – with Gaußstein
- Schönenberg (457.1 m)
- Hasselberg (also called the Schrodhalbe; 452.5 m) – with TV tower
- Hahnenbreite (452.0 m)
- Alte Schmacht (447.5 m) – with transmission facility
- Eisernstieg (446.3 m)
- Strutberg (444 m) – with "Sollingturm" observation tower
- Großer Lauenberg (442.6 m)
- Wildenkiel (c. 441 m)
- Auerhahnkopf (c. 440 m)
- Hengstrücken (424 m)
- Buchholz (421.7 m)
- Sonnenköpfe (414.6 m; western peak)
- Sonnenköpfe (407.0 m; eastern peak)
- Junge Schmacht (388.0 m)
- Platte (379.7 m)
- Sommerberg (364.5 m)
- Kahlberg (224.7 m)

== Villages and towns ==
Villages and towns in the Solling are:

- Abbecke
- Amelith
- Bad Karlshafen
- Bevern
- Bodenfelde
- Boffzen
- Dassel
- Derental
- Einbeck
- Espol
- Fohlenplacken
- Fredelsloh
- Fürstenberg
- Hardegsen
- Hellental
- Hilwartshausen
- Holzminden
- Höxter
- Kammerborn
- Lauenförde
- Lauenberg
- Lüchtringen
- Mackensen
- Merxhausen
- Mühlenberg
- Neuhaus
- Nienover
- Schießhaus
- Sievershausen
- Silberborn
- Schönhagen
- Schorborn
- Sohlingen
- Uslar
- Vahle
- Wahmbeck

== Literature ==
Johannes Krabbe: Karte des Sollings von 1603, herausgegeben und eingeleitet von Hans-Martin Arnoldt, Kirstin Casemir und Uwe Ohanski, Verlag Hahnsche Buchhandlung Hannover 2004.
