= Wolbrechtshausen =

- Ortsteil of Nörten-Hardenberg
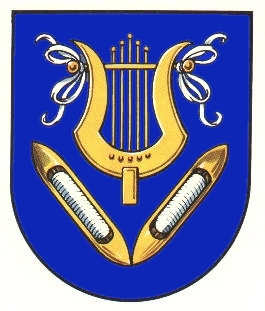
- Coat of arms
- Interactive map of Wolbrechtshausen
- Location within Germany Location within Lower Saxony
- Coordinates: 51°38′N 9°54′E
- Country: Germany
- State: Lower Saxony
- District: Northeim
- Municipality: Nörten-Hardenberg

Area
  - Total: 4.679 km^{2} (1.807 sq mi)
- Elevation: 157 m (515 ft)

Population (2013-12-31)
  - Total: 529
  - Density: 113/km^{2} (293/sq mi)
- Time zone: UTC+01:00 (CET)
  - Summer (DST): UTC+02:00 (CEST)
- Postal codes: 37176
- Dialling codes: 05503

Wolbrechtshausen is a part of the municipality Nörten-Hardenberg in the district of Northeim in Lower Saxony.

== Geographical position ==
Wolbrechtshausen is located on the western end of the Leine river valley between Solling and Harz. Through the village flows the river Espolde, a tributary of the Leine. Highest point of the location is the Höheberg with a height of 177,4 m over NN. Neighbouring villages are Hevensen, Lütgenrode and Parensen.

== History ==
The first written reference of the village is from the year 1210 in a duplication of the 13th century and calls the location as Wolbreteshusen. An older reference from the 12th century often confuses the village with the deserted site Wolbechteshusen near Gillersheim. In 1345 it is written that the house of Hardenberg owned a large manor in Wolbrechtshausen. Then in 1486 Wolbrechtshausen became a casualty of a great fire and nearly the whole village burned down. One century later in 1597 the pest raged there and so much people died that there were not enough left to cultivate the cropland.

The first school in the village was built in 1709. In the 19th century Wolbrechtshausen was the home of the linen weaver. From this episode in the village witnesses an old linen weaver flag that was spent to the village for carnival and survived the time till today. Another sign of this time are the two weaver's shuttles in the coat of arms that was given to the village in 1964. Since the foundation Wolbrechtshausen was an agricultural impressed village but with the beginning of the 20th century it became more a working-class quarter for the near cities.

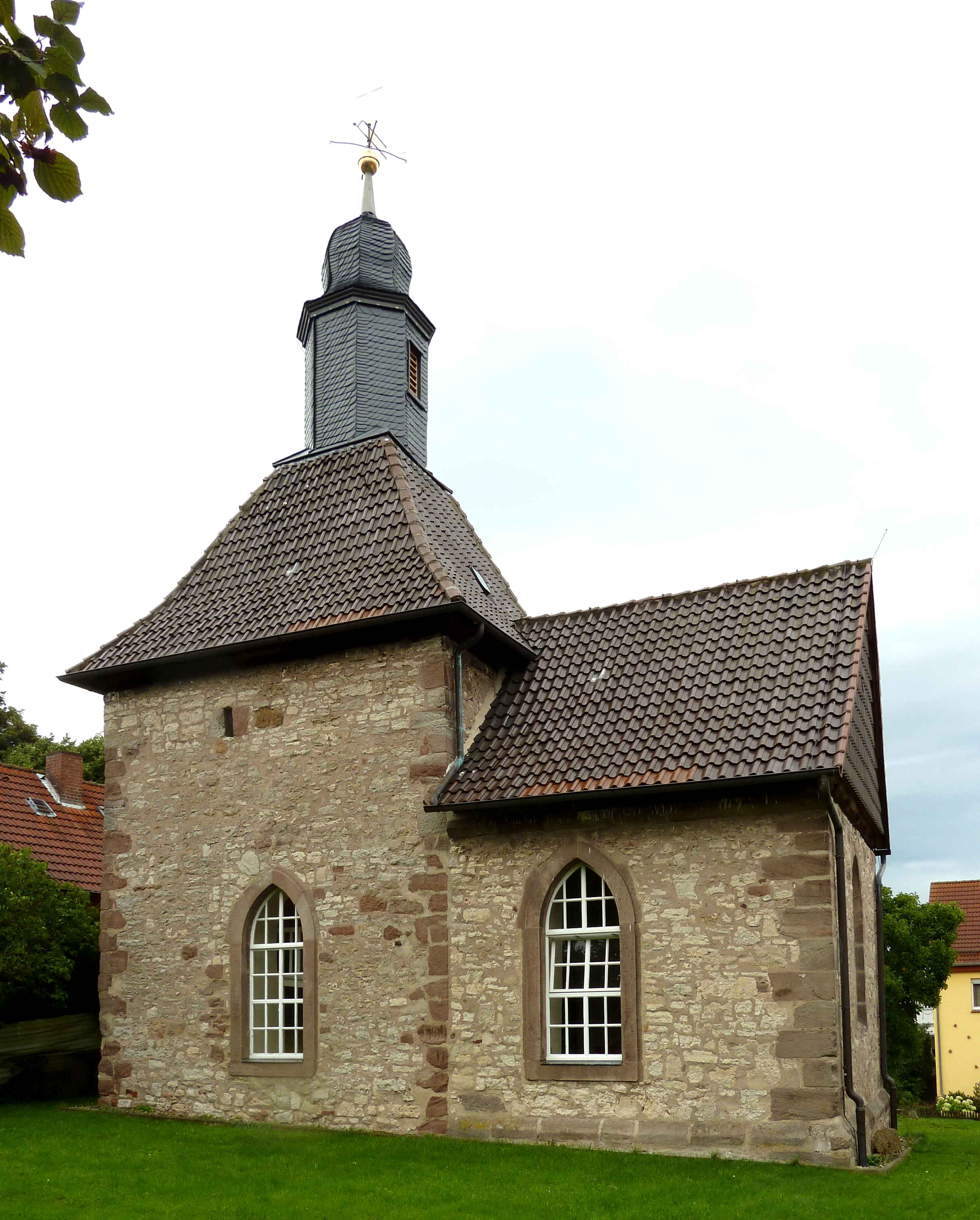
Protestant chapel

=== Protestant chapel ===
Wolbrechtshausen is habitat of a small chapel built in the 14th century. Before it became a chapel it was a defence tower. A few centuries later the inhabitants added a nave and church windows. From the original defence tower are the wall strength from over one meter and the crenels conserved.

== Economy and infrastructure ==
The economy of the village consists of some small business and farms

=== Traffic ===
The federal highway 446 take course on the north of Wolbrechtshausen and public traffic consists of two bus routes. Next train stations are Nörten-Hardenberg and Hardegsen.

== Notable people born and lived in Wolbrechtshausen ==
- Wilhelm Lambrecht (* 3 February 1834 in Wolbrechtshausen, † 17 June 1904 in Göttingen), mechanic and entrepreneur
- Marcos Vizquel (* 26 June 1984 in Venezuela),

Entrepreneur, Businessman
