= Weende =

Weende may refer to:

- Weende (Leine), a river of Lower Saxony, Germany, tributary of the Leine
- Weende, Göttingen, a district of Göttingen, Lower Saxony, Germany
