= Nörten-Hardenberg =

- Municipality
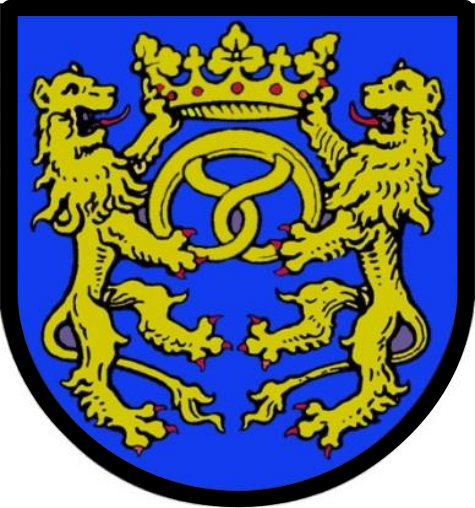
- Coat of arms

- Location of Nörten-Hardenberg within Northeim district
- Interactive map of Nörten-Hardenberg
- Location within Germany Location within Lower Saxony
- Coordinates: 51°37′N 9°56′E
- Country: Germany
- State: Lower Saxony
- District: Northeim
- Subdivisions: 8 districts

Government
  - Mayor (2021–26): Susanne Glombitza (Ind.)

Area
  - Total: 54.13 km^{2} (20.90 sq mi)
- Elevation: 159 m (522 ft)

Population (2025-12-31)
  - Total: 7,718
  - Density: 142.6/km^{2} (369.3/sq mi)
- Time zone: UTC+01:00 (CET)
  - Summer (DST): UTC+02:00 (CEST)
- Postal codes: 37176
- Dialling codes: 05503
- Vehicle registration: NOM
- Website: www.noerten-hardenberg.de

Nörten-Hardenberg (German pronunciation: [ˈnœʁtn̩ ˈhaʁdn̩bɛʁk]; Eastphalian: Nörten-Harenbarg) is a municipality in the district of Northeim, in Lower Saxony, Germany.

== Geography ==
It is situated on the river Leine, approx. 10 km southwest of Northeim, and 10 km north of Göttingen. The main town is located on the foothills of the Nörtener Wald but great parts of the municipality are in the Leinegraben, a lowland between the Solling and the Harz.

Neighbor communities are Bovenden (south), Hardegsen (west), Moringen (northwest), Katlenburg-Lindau (east) and Northeim (north)

Besides the main town itself, the following villages are component localities of Nörten-Hardenberg:

- Angerstein
- Bishausen
- Elvese
- Lütgenrode
- Nörten-Hardenberg
- Parensen
- Sudershausen
- Wolbrechtshausen

== History ==
Hardenberg Castle, first mentioned in 1101, was built by the Electors of Mainz. Their Ministeriales (or Burgmann) were the lords of Rosdorf, who were expelled in 1287, followed by the lords of Thüdinghausen (near Moringen) who took on the name knights of Hardenberg. (They are not to be confounded with a westphalian noble family of Hardenberg Castle near Velbert, extinct in 1450). A branch went to Denmark around 1340, which later became extinct, Anne Hardenberg belonging to it. The family acquired further properties near Nörten-Hardenberg, as well as in other regions of Northern Germany. Since 1409 Hardenberg Castle was split between two family branches. Partly destroyed by a thunderstorm in 1698, the castle was abandoned in 1720 and became a ruin. In 1778 created counts, the Hardenberg family, whose most prominent members were Karl August von Hardenberg, prime minister of Prussia, and the poet Novalis, still owns the estate. Since 1710 the family occupies the nearby manor house. In 1700, they founded the Hardenberg-Wilthen distillery, today Germany's second largest liquor producer.

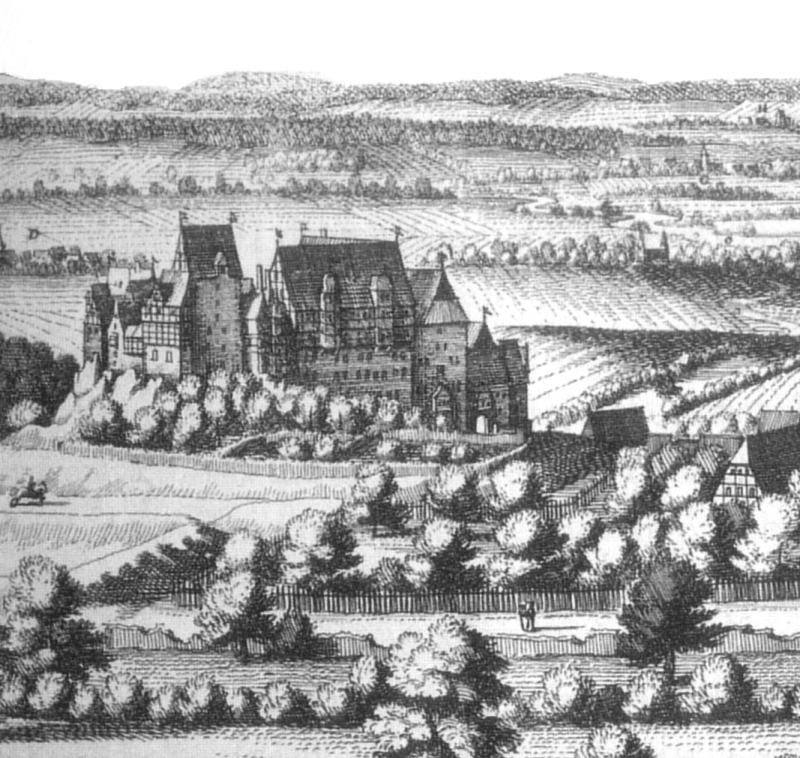
Hardenberg Castle in 1648

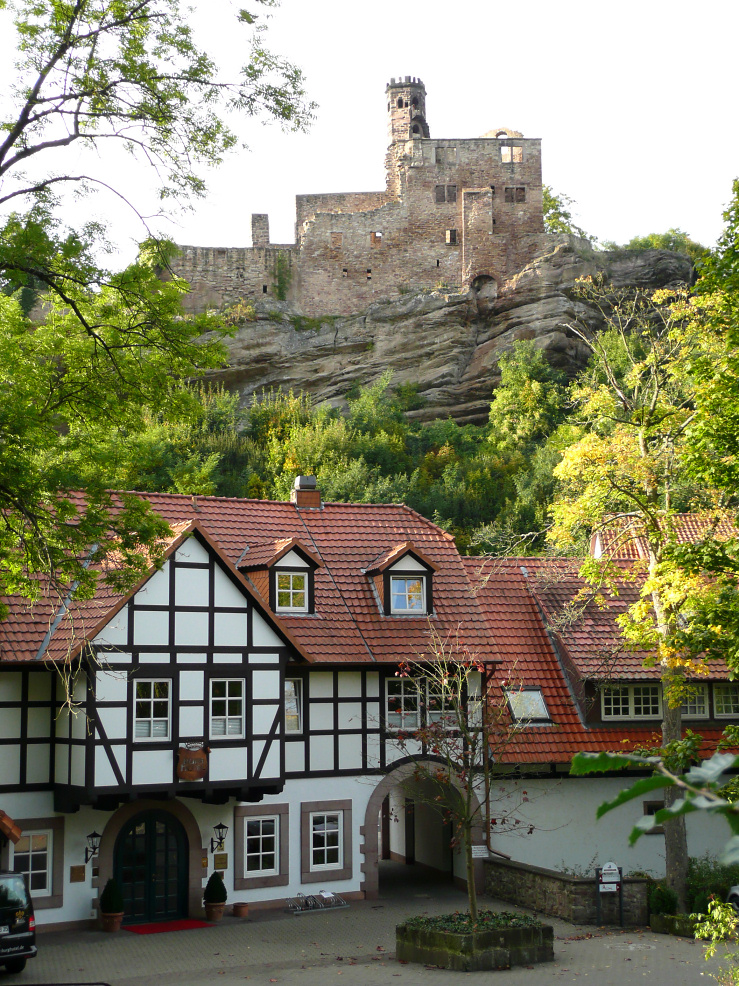
Ruin of Hardenberg Castle

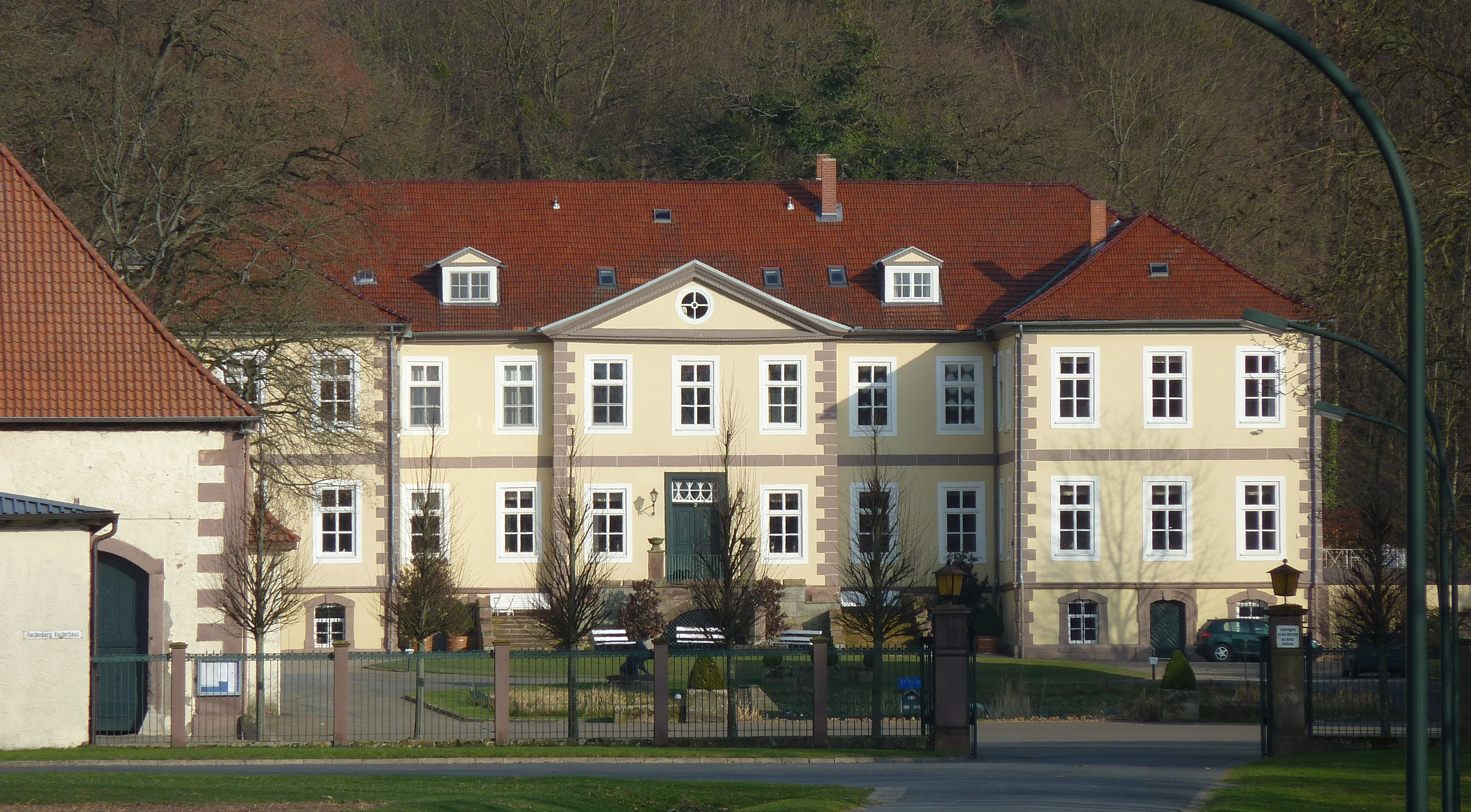
Hardenberg manor house

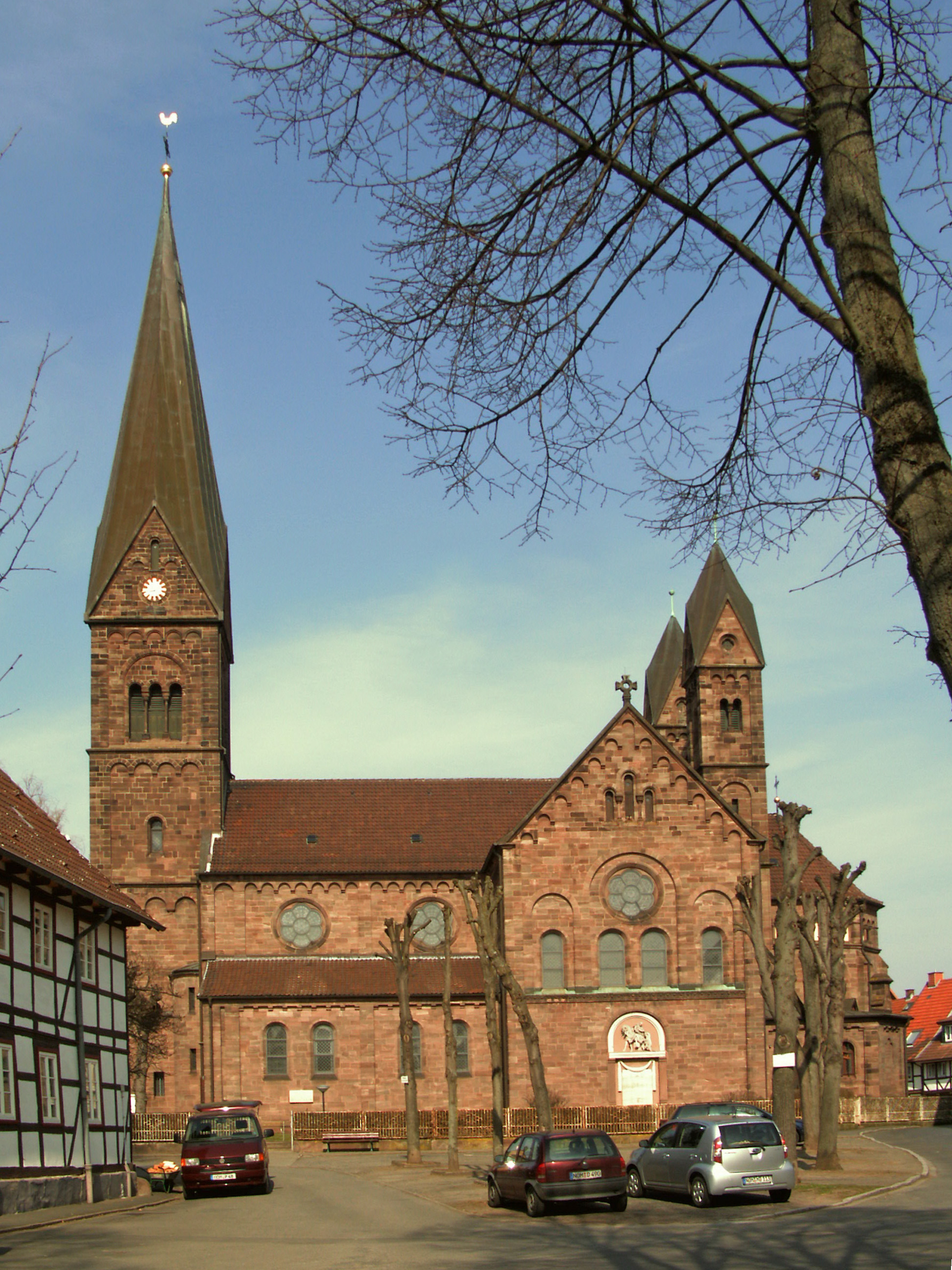
The Catholic Church
