= Lindau (Katlenburg-Lindau) =

- Ortsteil of Katlenburg-Lindau
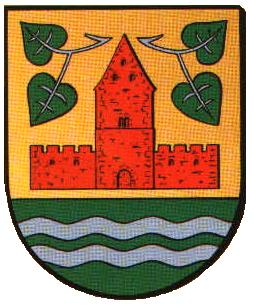
- Coat of arms
- Interactive map of Lindau
- Location within Germany Location within Lower Saxony
- Coordinates: 51°40′57″N 10°5′57″E
- Country: Germany
- State: Lower Saxony
- District: Northeim
- Municipality: Katlenburg-Lindau

Government
  - Mayor: Heinrich Schmidt (CDU)

Area
  - Total: 9.92 km^{2} (3.83 sq mi)

Population (2021)
  - Total: 1,721
  - Density: 173/km^{2} (449/sq mi)
- Time zone: UTC+01:00 (CET)
  - Summer (DST): UTC+02:00 (CEST)
- Postal codes: 37191
- Dialling codes: 05556
- Vehicle registration: NOM
- Website: www.katlenburg-lindau.de

Lindau (German pronunciation: [ˈlɪndaʊ]; also: Lindau (Eichsfeld)) is a village in the southern Lower Saxon section of the Eichsfeld, Germany. Lindau belongs to the Gemeinde (municipality) of Katlenburg-Lindau and to the Landkreis (district) of Northeim. The village is known to many space physicists and radio engineers around the world, as the Max Planck Institute for Solar System Research (known as "Max Planck Institute for Aeronomy" until June 2004) was based there until 2014, when it moved to Göttingen, also in Lower Saxony.

== Geography ==
Lindau lies on an area of level farmland between the Oder and Rhume rivers.

== History ==
Lindau was mentioned in writing for the first time in 1184. Around 1322 Otto II of Woldenberg, bishop of Hildesheim, established the Mushaus, today the oldest building of the municipality of Gemeinde Katlenburg-Lindau, and in which the Lindau administration was accommodated until 1741.

In the 19th century, Lindau's economy grew with a jute spinning mill set up by the Greve company (1872) and the brewery.

=== The fire of Easter 1911 ===
In the afternoon of 15 April 1911, Easter Sunday, Lindau experienced its largest and most devastating fire. In a farmyard in the Unterflecken area of the village, two boys had made a fire. Since it was very windy, the fire spread to the farm buildings and those of a bricklayer. Primitive fire fighting equipment and the distance from the local river led to the entire Unterflecken being burnt. Sparks ignited other houses and stored chemicals exploded.

42 houses and 30 auxiliary buildings were destroyed and many were never rebuilt. In the village marketplace the Mariendenkmal monument was erected. In the same year, a local volunteer fire brigade was established.

=== Weimar Republic (1918–1933) ===
Lindau's predominantly catholic population influenced the village's voting pattern . (A census from the year 1934 indicated there were 1487 inhabitants, of whom 85.5% were Catholic, only 14.5% Lutheran while no Jewish inhabitants were recorded.)

The Zentrumspartei centrist party, abbreviated 'Zentrum', held a special supremacy in the district during the period of the Weimar Republic. In 1920 Zentrum gained 69.8% of Lindau's Reichstag votes. This high vote was maintained through all the years of the Weimar Republic until 1932, when with the last free elections this party still gained 60.8% of the vote while in many other places the Nazi Party had long been the strongest political power. The Nazis recorded just two votes (0.3%) for the first time in 1928 and were insignificant at first in subsequent years. In November 1932 the Nazis were no longer to be ignored, at 21.9% the second strongest party in Lindau after the Zentrum. A local Nazi group formed in 1930 (the district's first had been formed in 1925 in Duderstadt).

The last months of the Weimar Republic were shaped by violent political arguments in Lindau, with many party meetings and banners in the village. A news item from this time reports that a Lindau SA member was hurt “by a political opponent, with a key, on the head.”

=== Lindau during national socialism (1933–1945) ===
No documents remain from the March 1933 elections, but it is assumed that Lindau voted along customary lines. At first the Lindau population remained sceptically opposed to the new ruling powers. However, the concordat between the German Reich and the Vatican encouraged many Catholic voters. Gradually national socialism became acceptable among them.

In May 1933 the first Nazi mayor was appointed. The municipality had no more influence on policy. The new ruling powers determined everything.

In November of the same year Reichstag elections took place. However it was only possible to vote 'yes' or 'no'. With these elections 910 Lindauers voted for the Nazis: 98%. Only 19 voters (approx 2%) were either invalid or 'no' votes.

Job creation measures led to new roads and more people. Among other things in 1938 the market place was paved and was used as a stage for many political demonstrations.

The economy flourished, the Greve string factory for example got many orders from the armed forces during preparations for the Second World War.

=== Second World War (1939–1945) ===
An early influence of the outbreak of World War II was the arrival of women and children from large cities of the Saarland in December 1939.

During the war many prisoners of war came to Lindau, among others Frenchmen and Poles, who were used in agriculture.

In 1945 a group of Canadian airmen crashed.

The Second World War cost 111 Lindau soldiers' lives, nearly twice as high as the casualties in the First World War of 1914–1918.

=== The post-war period (1945–1949) ===
One of the first steps after the end of the war was the release of prisoners of war. In June 1945 approximately 200 British personnel were deployed in Lindau after the Americans had left and they remained until 1946.

Gradually life in Lindau began to normalise. On 3 June a new kindergarten was inaugurated and on 5 June the public library, after all National Socialist material had been removed, opened in the parsonage building. The school suffered from a shortage of teachers and textbooks "For learning books the school children possess nothing except for a Bible, Catechism and maybe a reader," wrote a teacher at that time.

Between the English occupiers and the Lindau population there existed a good relationship. The British held friendly matches with the FC Lindau soccer club.

After the war a research institute relocated to Lindau, where buildings of the Technical University of Hannover already existed. The convoy arrived on the 2nd and 3 March 1946. This was to become the Max Planck Institute for Solar System Research.

On 16 March 1946 the village school converted back into a catholic school after 88% of parents voted for this. However the Protestant children got their own religious education.

The high number of refugees from the large cities was problematic. Food, accommodation and work were scarce. The number of refugees constantly increased, bringing the population to 2400. All houses were heavily occupied, and the relationship between Lindauers and refugees was not always good.

Between 1946 and 1948 the Fleckenstraße road was paved, and the church tower was repaired in 1948.

=== Development from 1949 until today ===
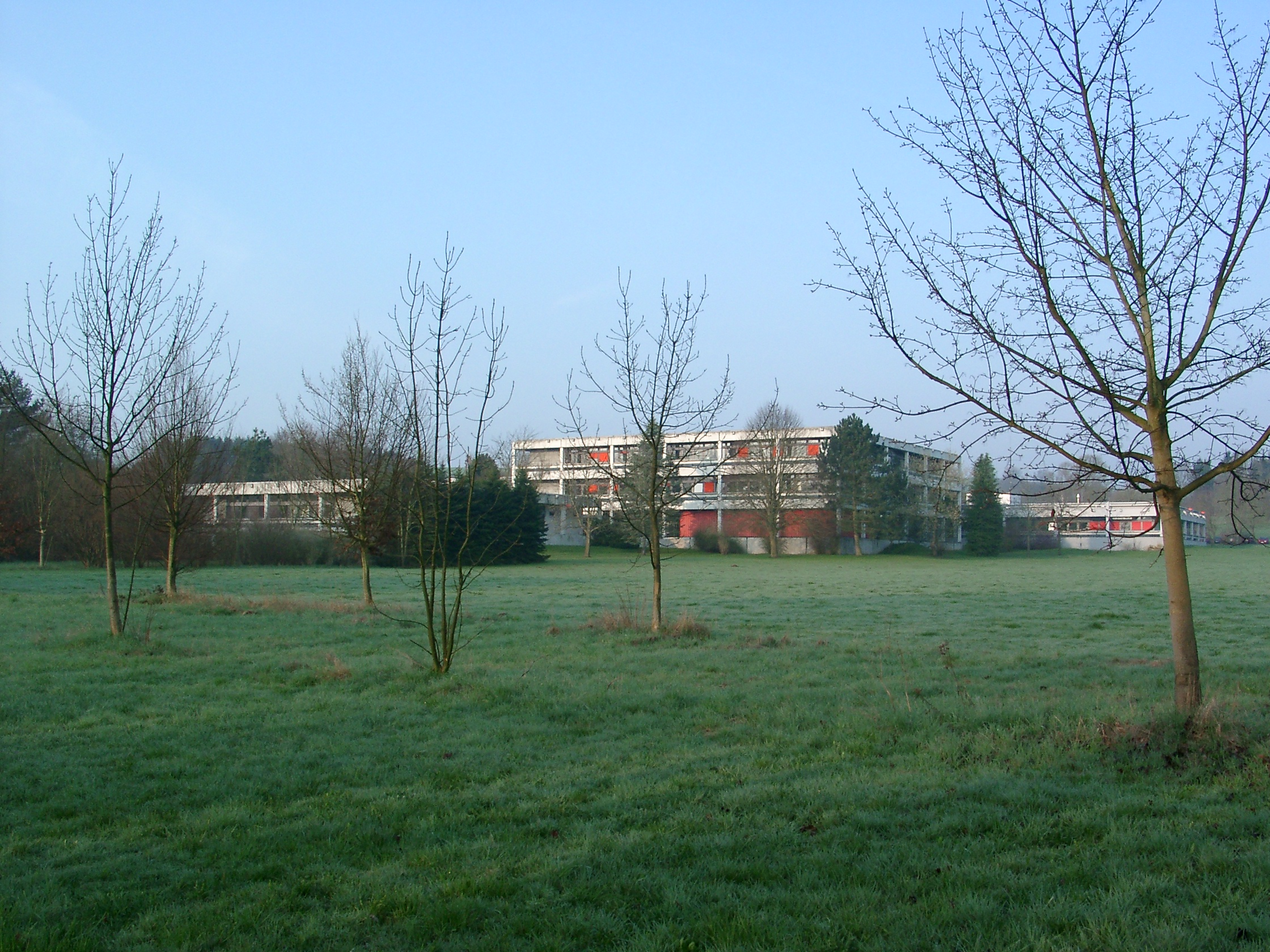
The Max Planck Institute for Solar System Research became a significant component of the village, attracting many international visitors

After the Second World War Lindau developed to the north and the entire infrastructure was improved.

In 1957 the village got a multipurpose hall, (reconditioned in 2006). A new elementary school was established in 1965 which serves today as a Hauptschule and Realschule. A new kindergarten was built in 1969. Lindau got its own sports field, and a new fire station was built in 1971 as well as asphalted roads equipped with modern lighting.

In 1969 Lindau joined the Rhumetal district drainage project, completed in 1976.

On 1 January 1973 as part of administrative reform of Lower Saxony the district of Duderstadt was dissolved, from which Lindau was placed in Landkreis Northeim (district). Lindau also lost the status of a municipality as together with six other villages the united municipality Gemeinde Katlenburg-Lindau was created. Lindau had become part of a predominantly Lutheran area and it is reported that the bell was tolled at the (catholic) village church.

In 1983 Lindau joined a natural gas network while the Peter und Paul Kirche catholic church was renovated during a seven-year closure.

The mill stream created in 1872 by the company Greve for water power at the oast house was filled in 1984.

In 1985 Lindau opened a large sportsground with a grandstand for 250 spectators.

In 1987 the district of Northeim built a "center for innovation" next to the Max Planck Institute, to offer production facilities for high tech companies.

In the years 1946, 1947, 1981 and 1994 Lindau was afflicted by heavy flooding of the Rhume, which caused severe damage. The flood dam built in 1995 has so far prevented similar events.

In 2014, the Max Planck Institute relocated to Göttingen.

== Aircraft crash over Lindau ==
On 29 October 1979 just after 5pm a US Grumman OV-1 Mohawk reconnaissance aircraft crashed near highway 247 to Bilshausen and set a stable on fire. Both pilots ejected safely after diverting the aircraft from densely populated parts of Lindau.

== Population ==
- 1815 – 1107 inhabitants
- 1848 – 1441 inhabitants
- 1905 – 1330 inhabitants
- 1921 – 1365 inhabitants
- 1934 – 1487 inhabitants
- 1946 – 2456 inhabitants
- 1950 – 2342 inhabitants
- 1960 – 2136 inhabitants
- 1978 – 2014 inhabitants
- 1994 – 1985 inhabitants
- 2006 – 1846 inhabitants

The remarkably high number of inhabitants immediately after the Second World War can be explained by 861 refugees in the year 1946.

== Notable buildings ==
- Mushaus: (a mashing house for the brewing of beer): features on the village coat of arms, once part of a 14th-century medieval castle
- Kirche Sankt Peter und Paul: (St Peter and Paul Catholic Church) built from 1754 in the baroque style.
- Evangelische Kreuzkirche: (Lutheran Church)
- Former Max Planck Institute for Solar System Research buildings south of the village (vacated by the institute when it relocated to Göttingen in 2014)

== Politics ==
Bürgermeister (mayors) and their party

- 1919 – 1926 Johannes Monecke; Zentrum
- 1926 Georg Barkefeld; Zentrum
- 1927 – 1933 Johannes Hellmann; Zentrum
- 1933 – 1939 Heinrich Leinemann; NSDAP
- 1939 – 1945 Joseph Wagener; NSDAP
- 1945 Anton Freyberg (no party)
- 1945 – 1946 Heinrich Hahn (no party)
- 1946 – 1952 August Linnekuhl; CDU
- 1952 – 1956 Theodor Fahlbusch; CDU
- 1956 – 1958 Johannes Wandt; CDU
- 1958 – 1968 Paul Brandfaß; CDU
- 1968 – 1972 Helmut Krüger; SPD
- 1972 – 1976 Hans-Gerhard Strüder; CDU
- 1976 – 1991 Horst Waßmann; CDU
- 1991 – 1994 Hubert Kopp; CDU
- 1994 – 2001 Werner Brandfaß; CDU
- 2001 – today Heinrich Schmidt; CDU

=== The Lindau Ortsrat (village council) ===
CDU: 7 seats SPD: 3 seats FDP: 1 seat

- Ortsbürgermeister (village mayor): Heinrich Schmidt (CDU)
- deputy: Gudrun Franz (CDU)
- 2nd deputy: Rudolf Rümke (SPD)

== Notable residents ==
- Igna Maria Jünemann (writer), d 1964

=== Notable directors of Max Planck Institute ===
- 1955–1964 Julius Bartels
- 1951–1975 Walter Dieminger
- 1974–1990 Sir (William) Ian Axford
- 1992–1998 Tor Hagfors

== Sister town ==
Since 1966, partnered with the Baden-Württemberg town of Binau.

== Sources ==
- Birgit Schlegel, Rudolf Brodhun et al.: Lindau – Geschichte eines Fleckens, Verlag Mecke Druck, 1995 (in German)
- various authors: Die Kirchen im Eichsfeld, Verlag Mecke Druck, 2005 (in German)
