= Hardeg Castle =

Castle in Hardegsen, Germany

- Hardegsen
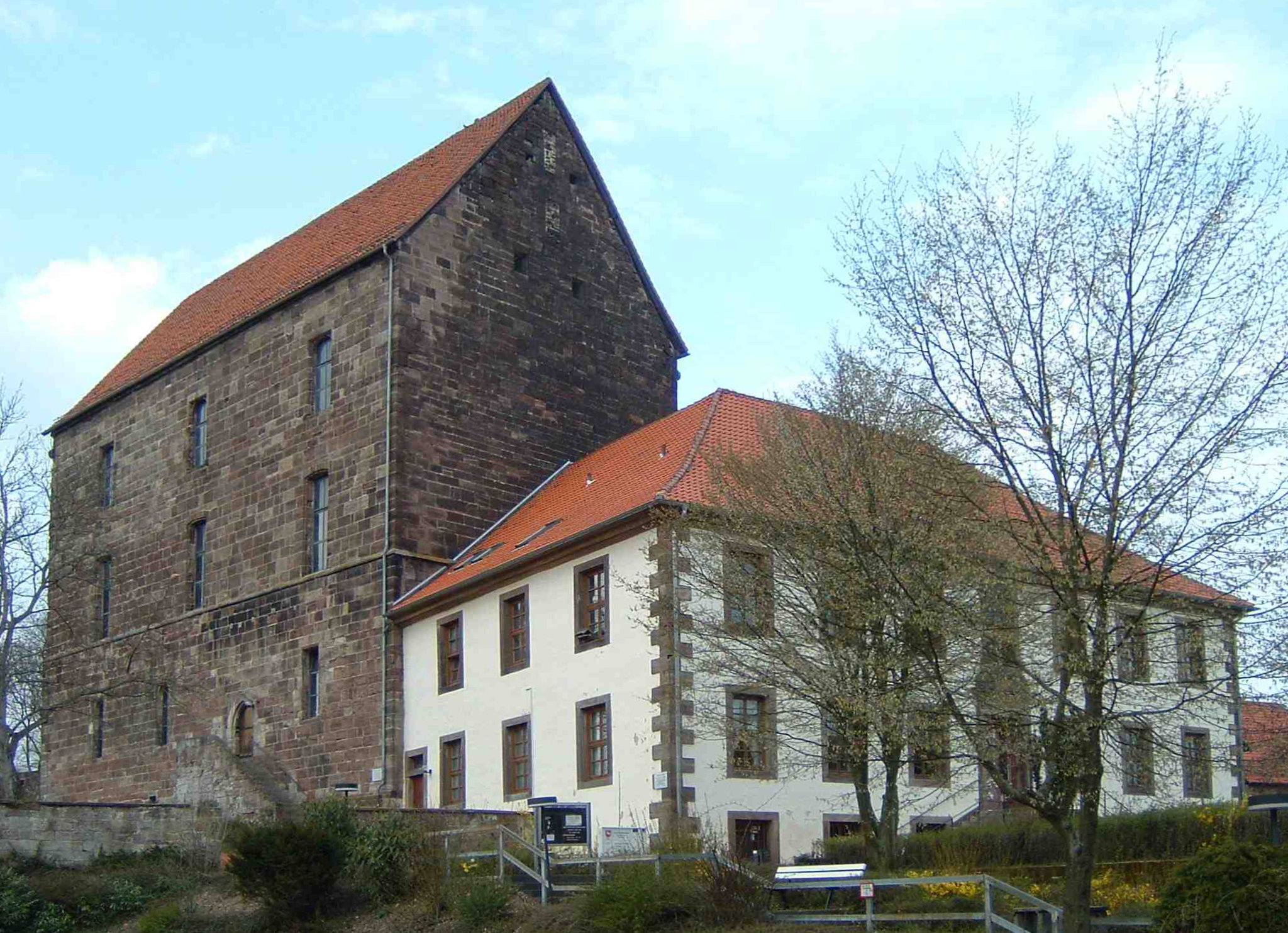
- Hardeg Castle

Site information
- Type: lowland castle
- Code: DE-NI
- Condition: preserved

Location
- Coordinates: 51°39′06″N 9°49′36″E

Site history
- Built: before 1330

Garrison information
- Occupants: dukes

Hardeg Castle (German: Burg Hardeg) is an old castle in the little Lower Saxon town of Hardegsen in the German county of Northeim. It was built in the 12th century and used to be the seat of government of the Welf dukes.

== History ==
The first castle was occupied in around 1330 by the "noble lords of Rosdorf".

In 1324, the Muthaus (Moshus = palas) was built by Conrad and Louis of Rosdorf and the place was expanded into large castle complex. The Muthaus has a height of 35 metres and is probably the oldest, fully surviving secular building in southern Lower Saxony. The expansion appears to have overstretched the lords financially.

In 1379, Duke Otto of Brunswick and Göttingen (Otto the Evil) acquired the castle. In 1380, it was the seat of government for the Welf duke after he had been driven out of Göttingen; he died here on 13 December 1394. The castle then became the dower seat of Duchess Margareta.

In 1560, Hardegsen ceased to be the princely residence and dower seat. From 1568 to 1823 the old castle became the head office of the Amt of Hardegsen, headed by a Drost or Amtmann.

From 1725 to 1780 major remodelling work was carried out on the castle in order to turn it into domestic buildings for the future estate (Domäne). Of the old castle, only the Muthaus, the Hagenhaus and parts of the castle wall remain.

In 1972 the estate and castle site were sold to the town of Hardegsen, who then rented it out. The Muthaus may be visited today, but is also hired out for events and celebrations. It is hired by the Hardegsen Cultural Project (Kulturinitiative Hardegsen). The income is used to maintain the castle. The great hall is used in spring and summer as a registry office.

== Literature ==
- Ernst Andreas Friedrich: Das Muthaus in Hardegsen, pp. 86-87, in: Wenn Steine reden könnten, Vol. III, Landbuch-Verlag, Hanover, 1995, ISBN 3-7842-0515-1.
