= Most Holy Trinity–St. Mary Catholic Church =

Catholic church in Brooklyn, New York

Coordinates: 40°42′25″N 73°56′39″W

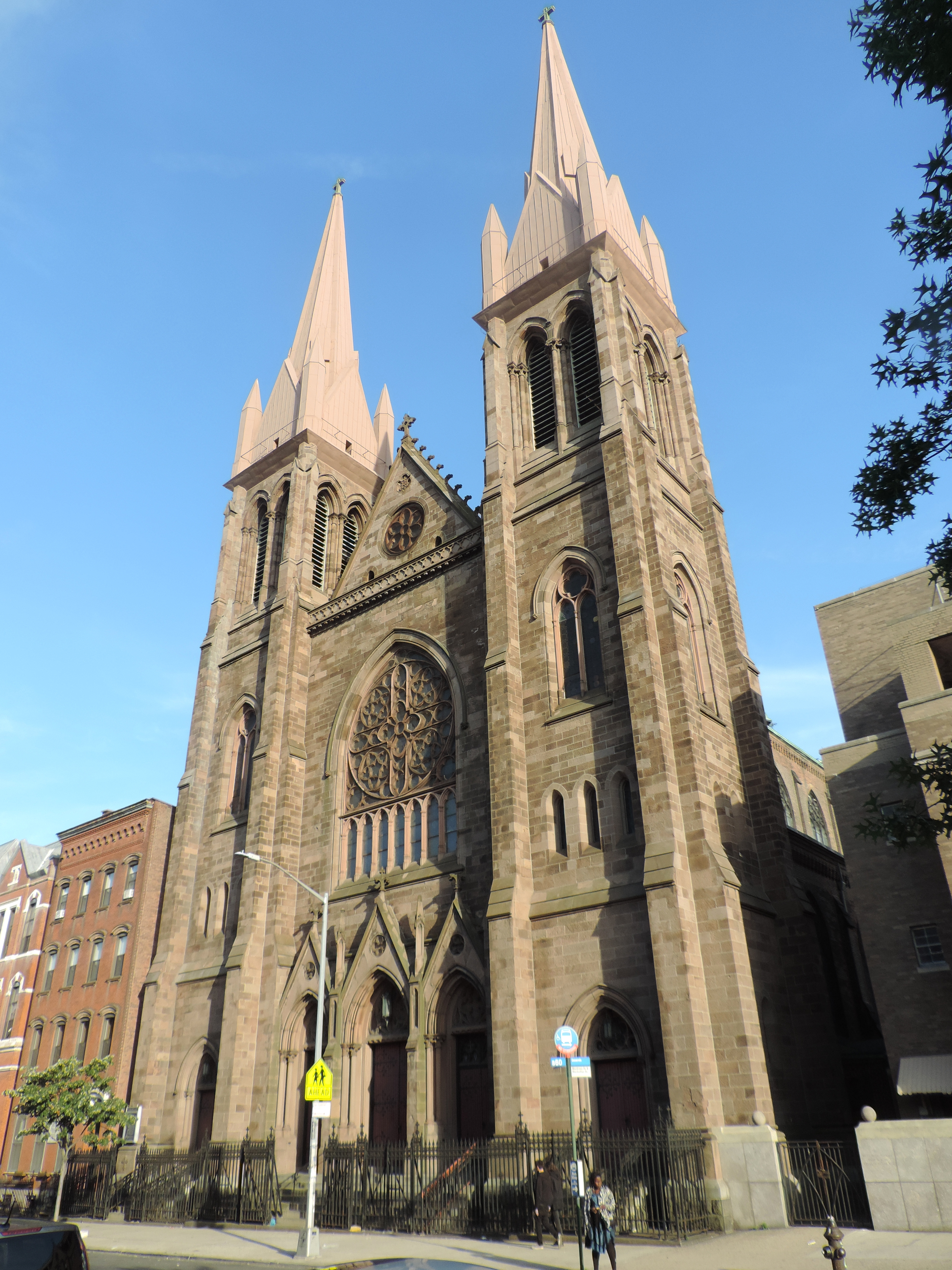
The church in 2016

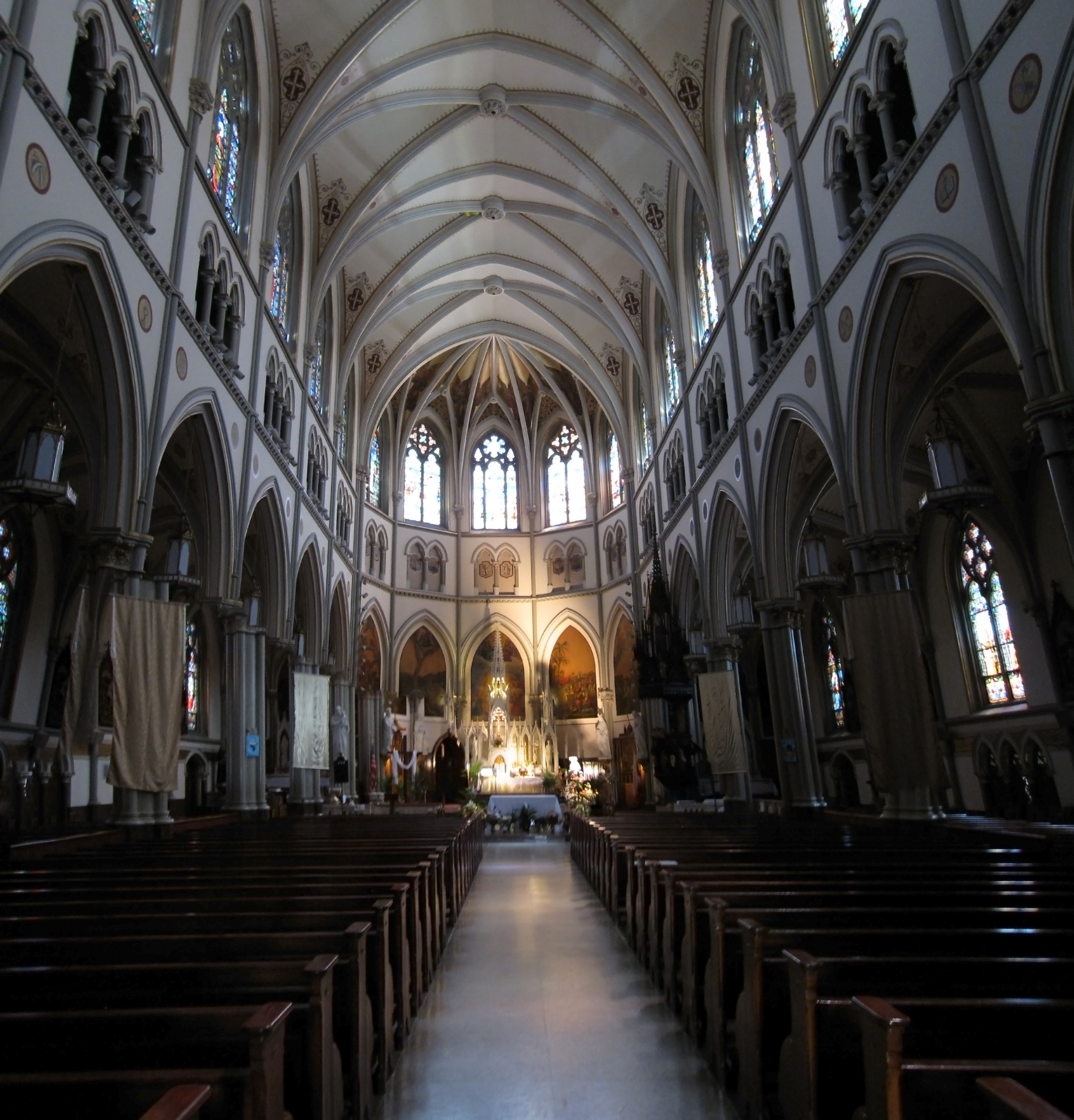
Interior in 2010

Most Holy Trinity–St. Mary Church is a French Gothic Revival church of the Catholic Diocese of Brooklyn in Williamsburg, Brooklyn, New York City, United States. The parish was founded in 1841 to serve the German American community. The current church building is the third constructed by the parish on the site, and it opened in 1885.

The parish established two cemeteries. One is in nearby Bushwick, and is known for its large number of metal grave markers due to its historical ban of stone markers to discourage distinctions between the rich and poor. The other is in North Amityville in Suffolk County, and is adjacent to the campus of the Sisters of St. Dominic, which has a historical connection with the parish.

== Architecture ==
The church was designed by William Schickel in a largely 13th-century French Gothic Revival, although it incorporates German Gothic features. The facade and the 20-story, 205-foot (62 m) twin towers are faced with brownstone from Belleville, New Jersey, and the left tower contains five bells. The spires are covered with lead and copper that was installed in 1990.

The building's interior layout is a basilica plan without transepts, with clustered columns, pointed arches, cruciform vaults, and a triforium. The church contains several murals painted by Wilhelm Lambrecht, and 34 stained-glass windows created by the Albert Neuhauser Mosaic Firm during 1884–1885.

As of 2011, the campus also consisted of a rectory built in 1872, a former elementary school building built in 1887, a faculty residence built in 1952, and a former high school complex, and a former Catholic Orphan Asylum.

== History ==
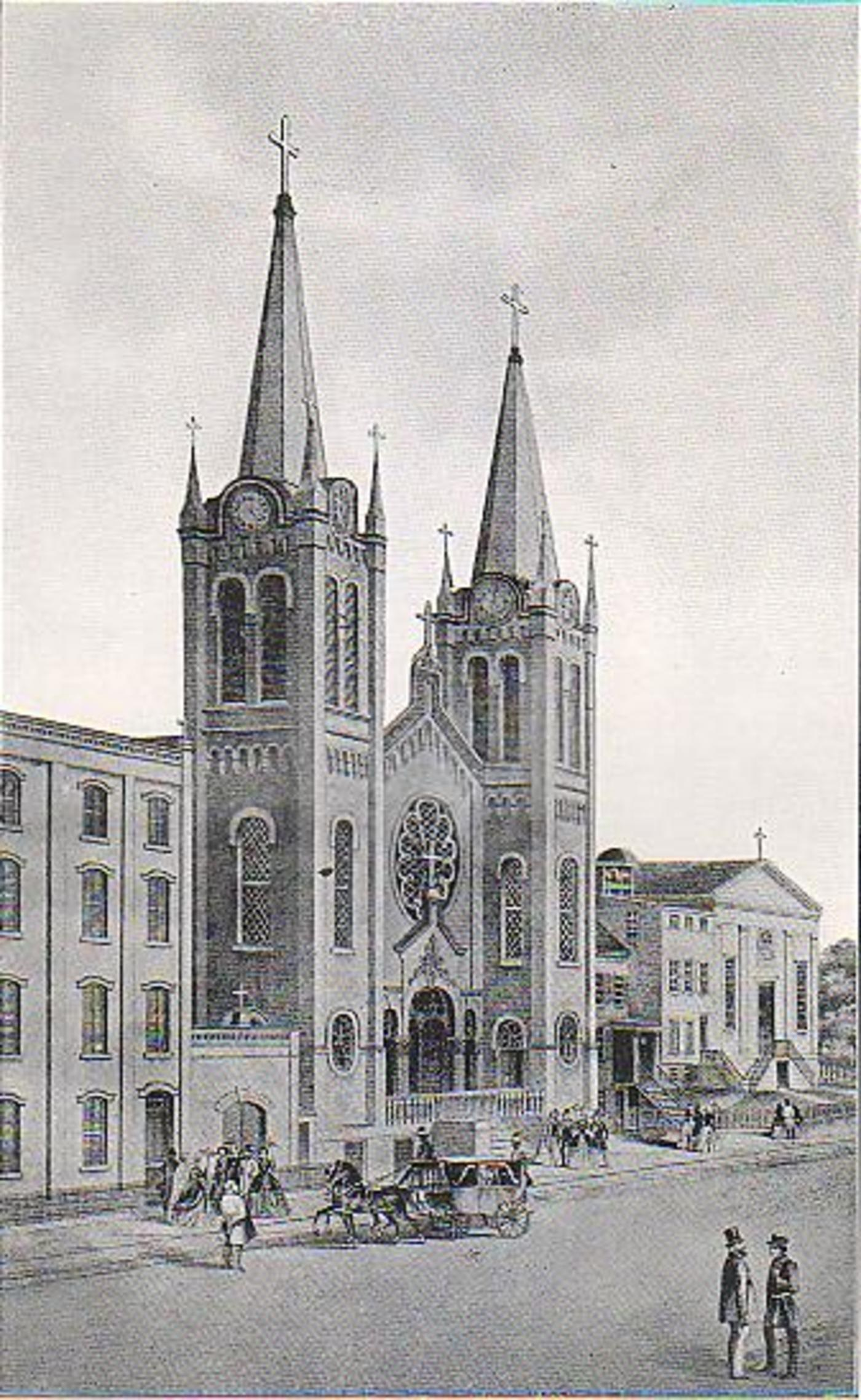
The brick second church, with the first church to its right

The church's founder, John Stephen Raffeiner, was an immigrant from Austria who used his wealth from his previous career as a doctor to found and support national churches for German Americans. Most Holy Trinity's first church building, a frame structure, was constructed in 1841, followed by a rectory in 1844. A new brick church building opened in 1854, although the original church building was retained. The current rectory was built in 1872.

The third and current church building opened in 1885, replacing the first church building, although the church's right tower was not completed until 1890. A school building opened in 1887, replacing the second church building. In 1895, a crypt beneath the church's narthex was built to hold the remains of the church's first two pastors; however, the remaining four vaults remain empty to the present.

In the 1850s, the parish employed armed guards to protect the building from Know-Nothing gangs led by William Poole who were trying to burn down Catholic churches in Williamsburg. From 1853 to the 1870s, the parish hosted four German nuns who would go on to found the Sisters of St. Dominic of Amityville. The novel A Tree Grows in Brooklyn, published in 1943, contains a description of the church; its author Betty Smith had been baptized there. In the early 20th century, two neighboring apartment buildings were joined and renovated into a high school, and a faculty residence was constructed in 1952.

The parish high school closed in 1972, and the elementary school in 2005. In 2007, Most Holy Trinity merged with the nearby Church of the Immaculate Conception of the Blessed Virgin Mary, which had been founded in 1853 as a national church serving Irish Americans. The St. Mary's Church building has been leased out since 2012.

== Cemeteries ==
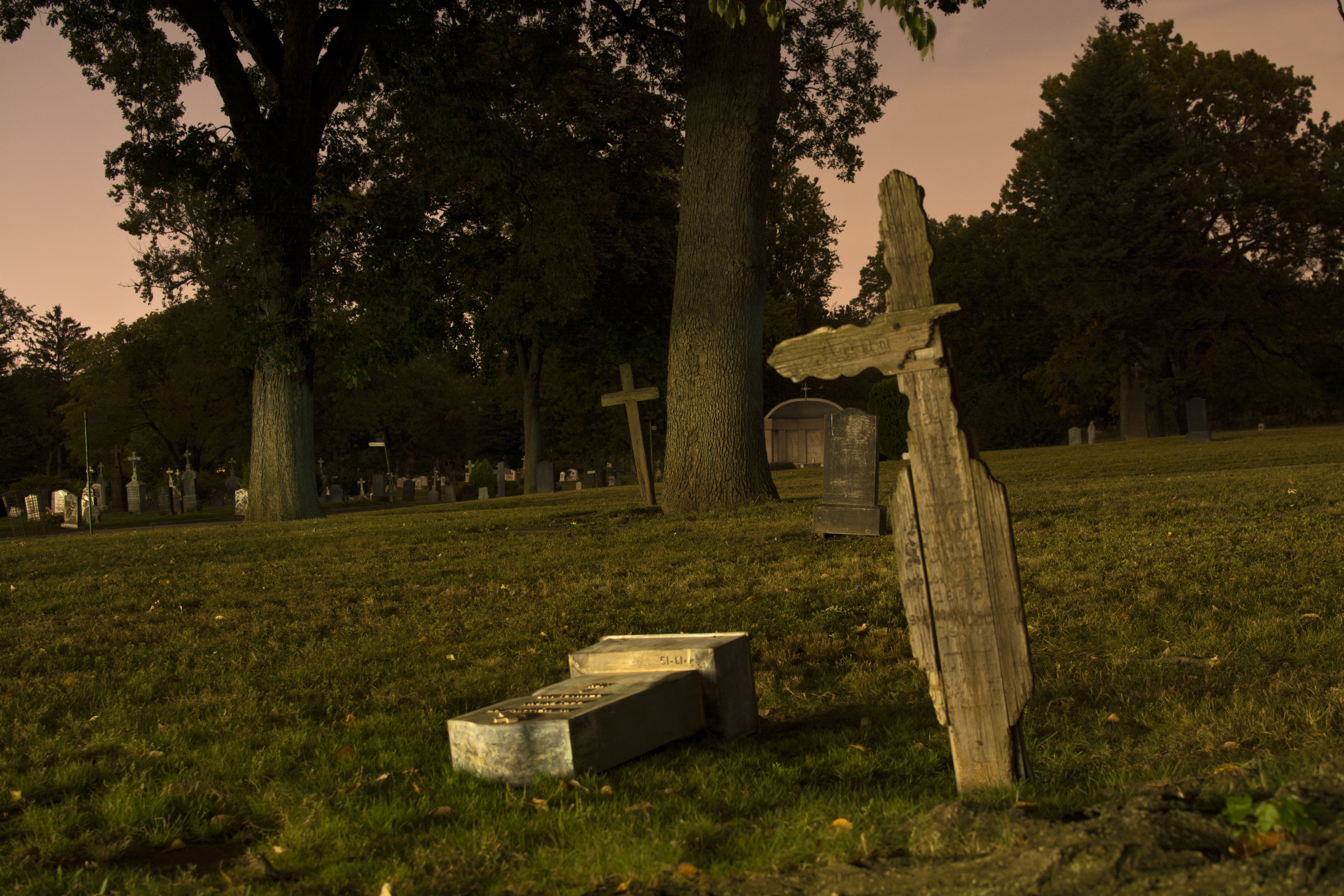
Tin and wood grave markers in Most Holy Trinity Cemetery in Bushwick in 2014

Two current cemeteries were established by the church: Most Holy Trinity Cemetery in Bushwick, Brooklyn and Trinity Cemetery in North Amityville in Suffolk County. In 1981, both cemeteries were transferred from the parish to Catholic Cemeteries of the Diocese of Brooklyn.

The parish's original cemetery was adjacent to the first church building and was established in 1841. Its remains were transferred to the Bushwick cemetery in 1851 to make room for construction of the second church building. The Bushwick cemetery was originally a 4-acre (1.6 ha) parcel purchased from Cemetery of the Evergreens, which was expanded by additional purchased of land in the following decades. It eventually grew to 25 acres (10 ha) and an estimated 25,000 burials by 2025.

The Bushwick cemetery originally banned stone grave markers to discourage distinctions between the rich and poor, as wealthy families of the time often used large, ostentatious stone markers. Initially many grave markers were made of wood, of which few survive. Since the late 19th century, the cemetery became known for its large number of metal grave markers, often made of iron or "white bronze" (actually tin, zinc, or copper). This has made the cemetery a target for metal theft, which was reported as early as 1950. In 1990, two thieves were caught tossing stolen grave markers over the cemetery fence. In 2024, a string of thefts of hundreds of grave markers occurred, and it was estimated that at least 1,300 were missing at that point. The incident caused the diocese to station security personnel at the cemetery and install razor wire atop its perimeter fence.

The Amityville cemetery is adjacent to the Sisters of St. Dominic Motherhouse Complex.

Notable burials include:

- Theresa Schmidt, victim of the Triangle Shirtwaist Factory fire (Bushwick)

== Gallery ==
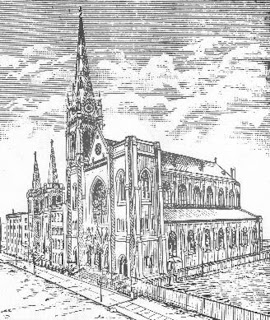
The church in 1886, with only one tower completed, and with the smaller second church to its left

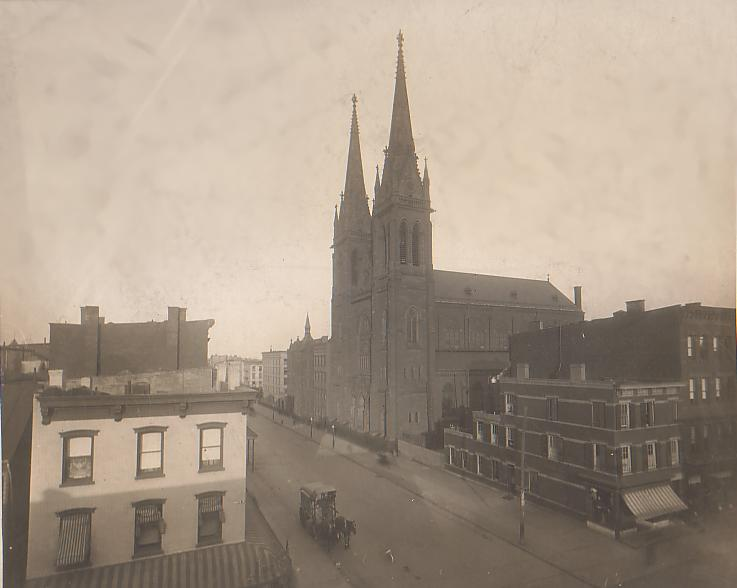
The church in 1916

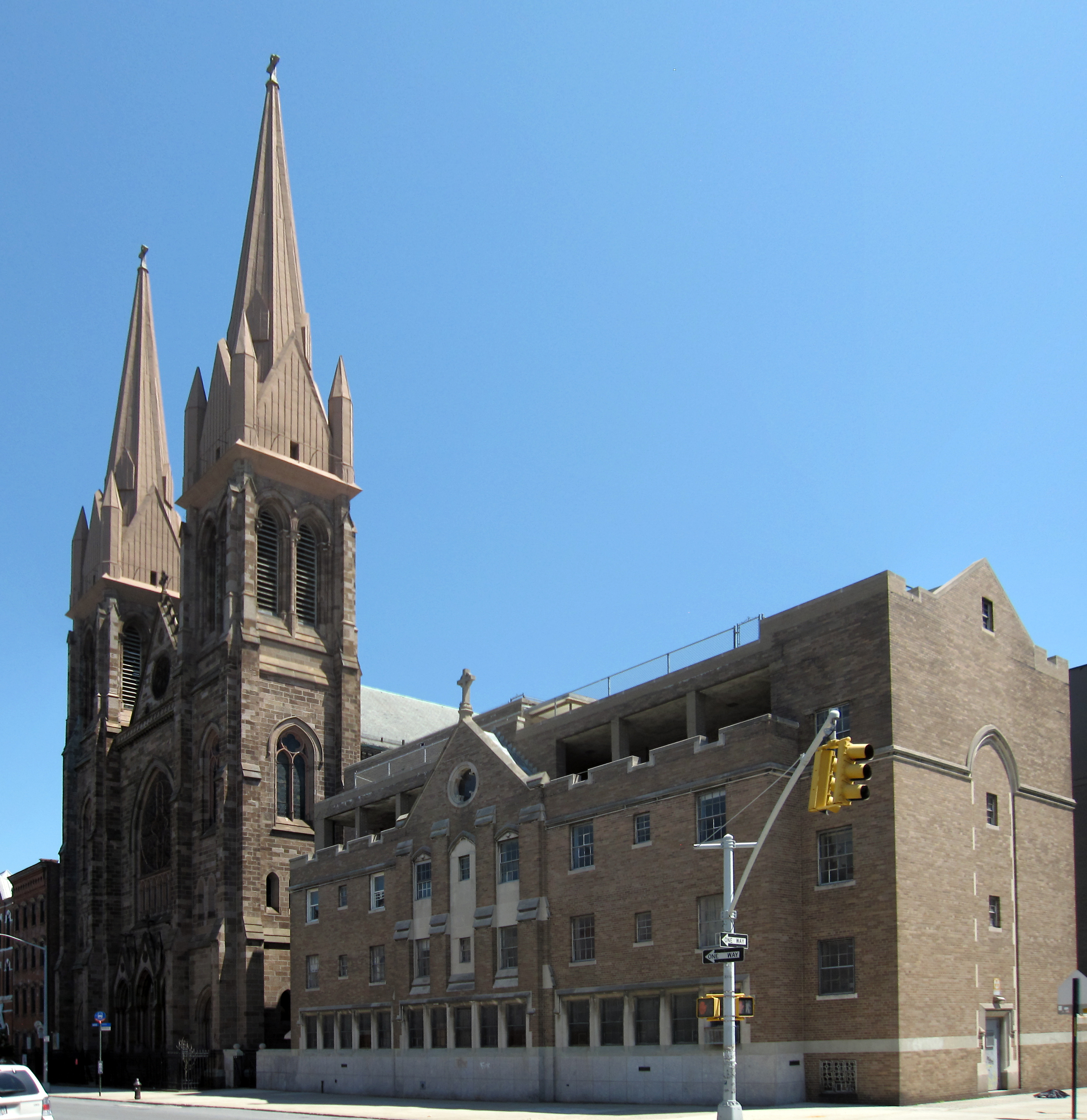
The church and faculty residence in 2010

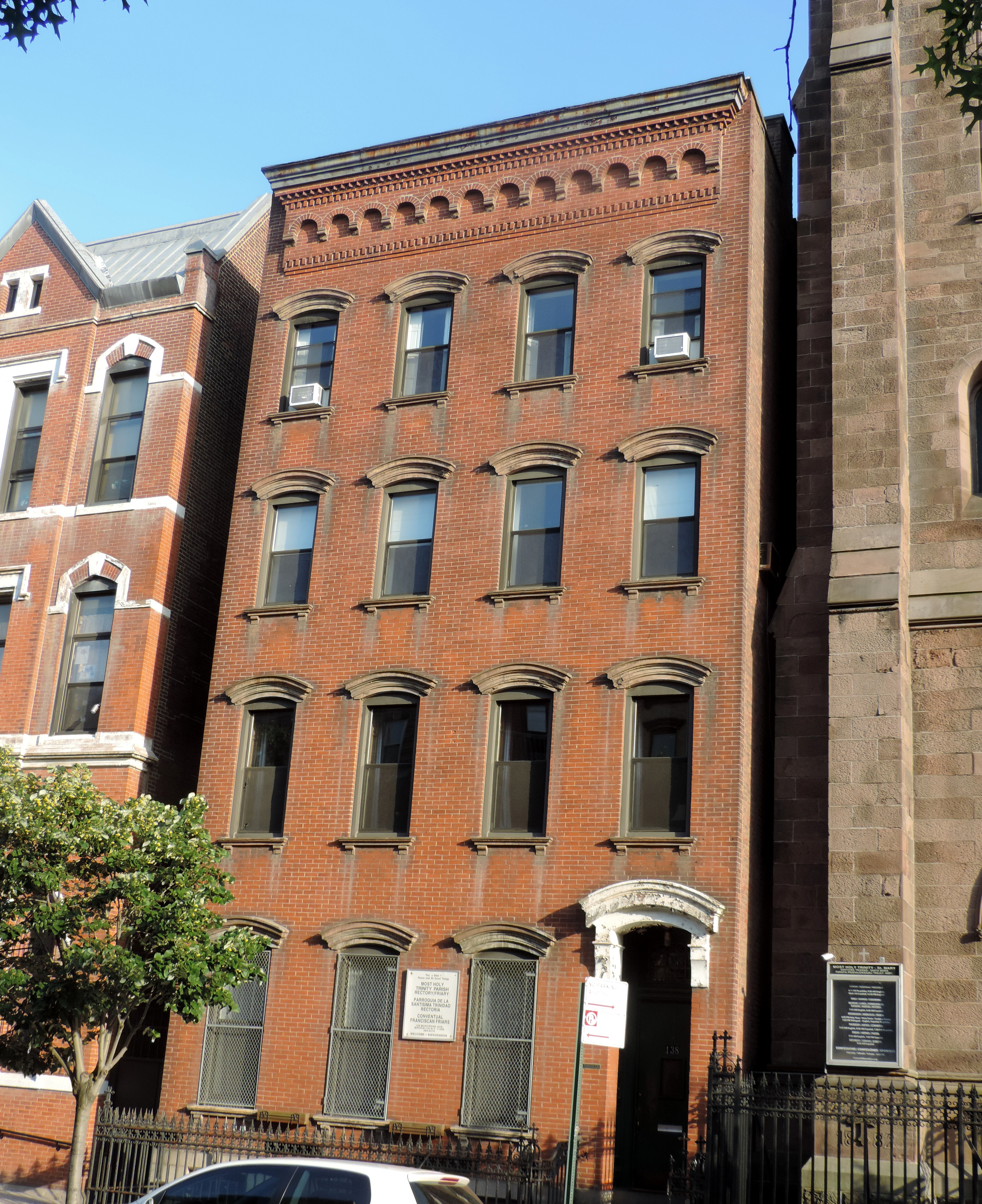
The rectory in 2016

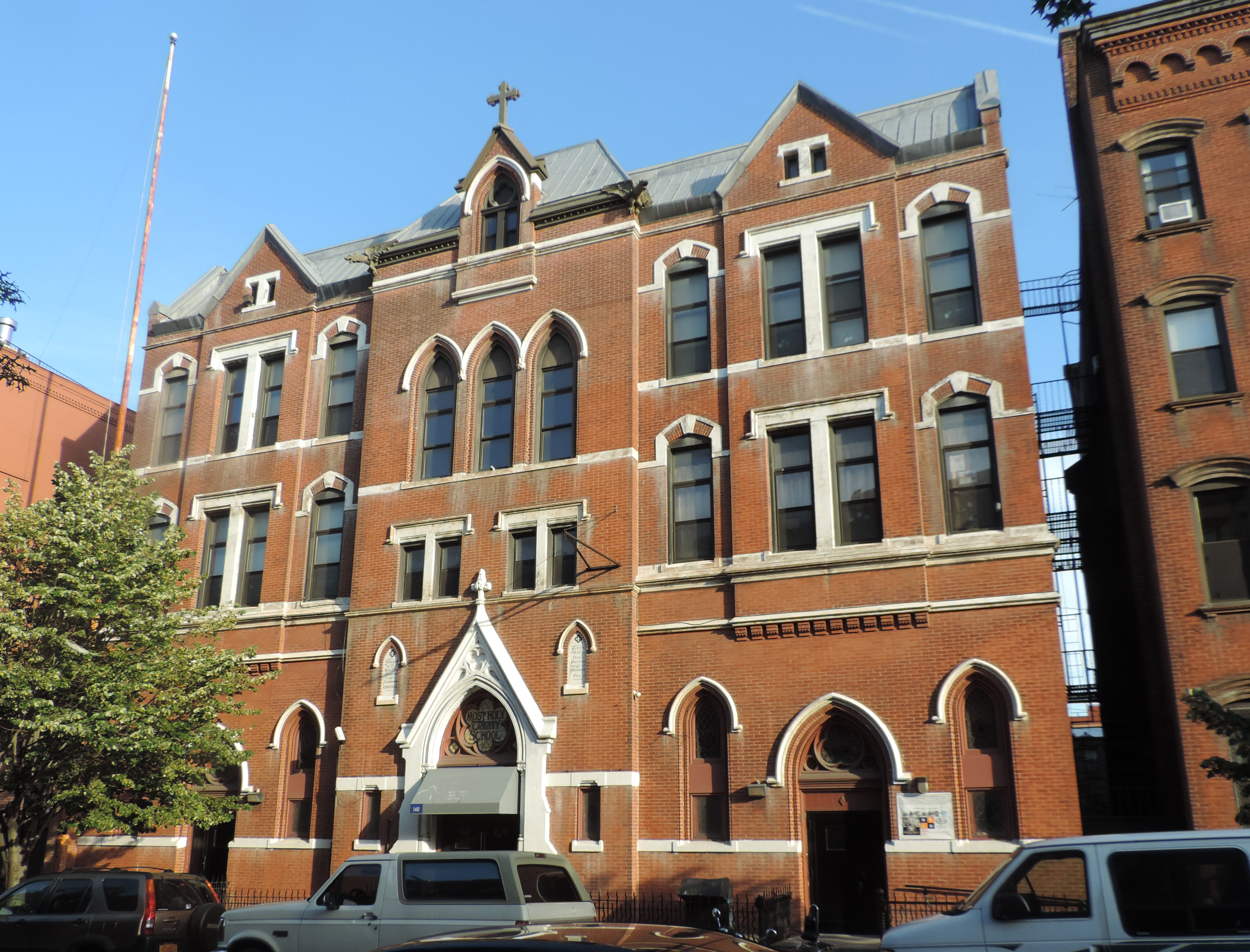
The elementary school building in 2016

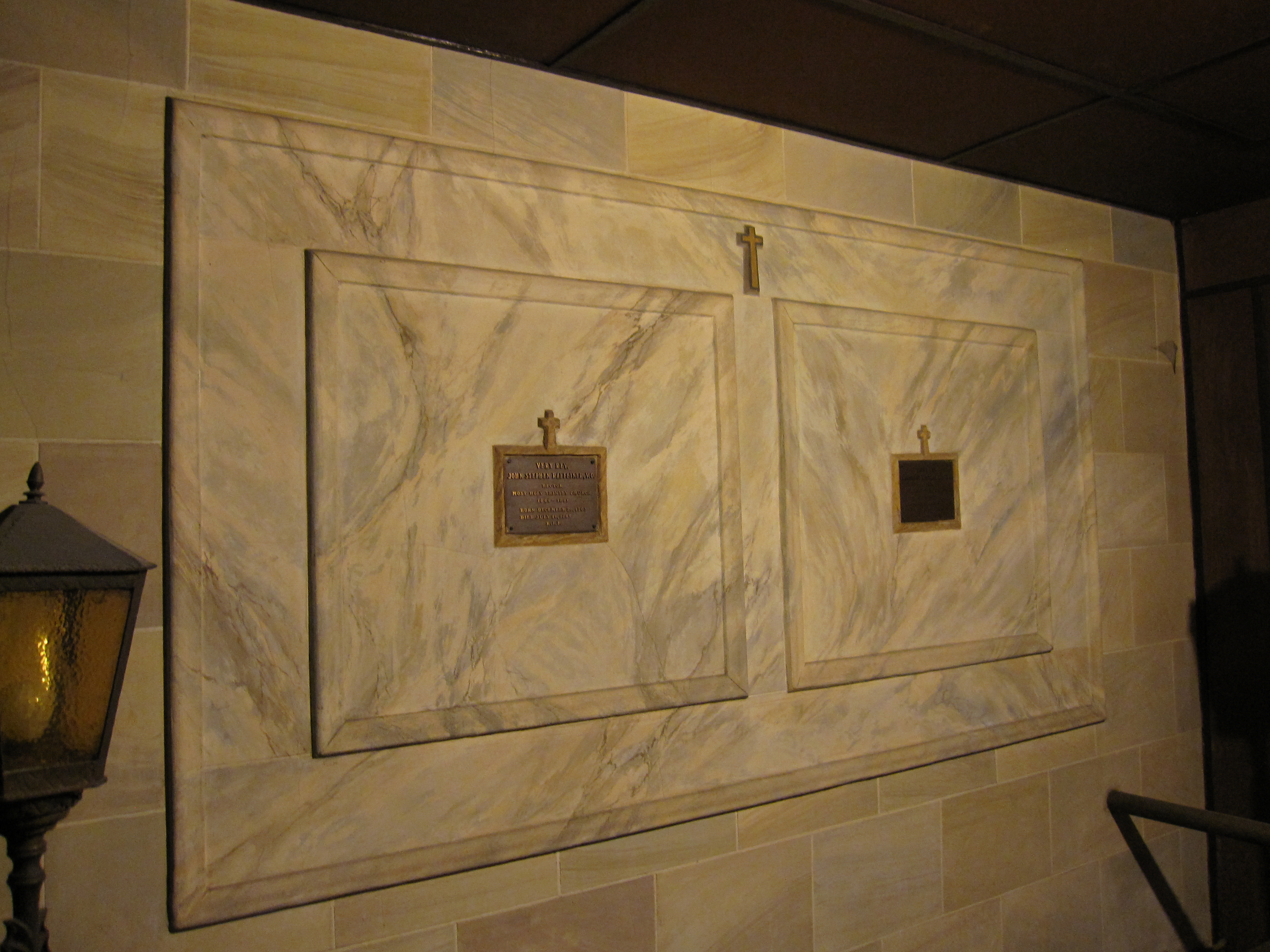
Tombs of the parish's first two priests in 2010

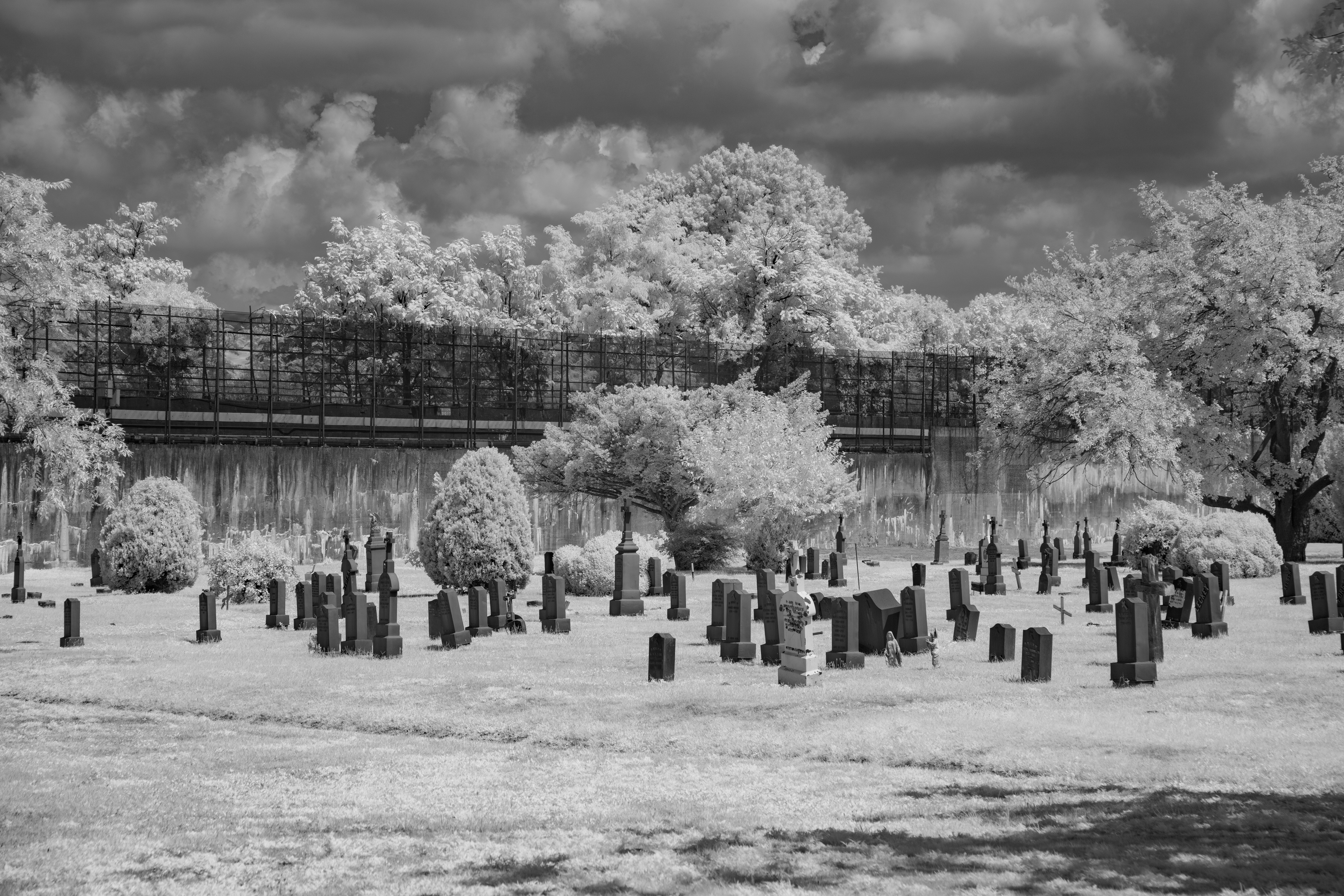
Most Holy Trinity Cemetery in Bushwick in 2025
