= Gillersheim =

- Ortsteil of Katlenburg-Lindau
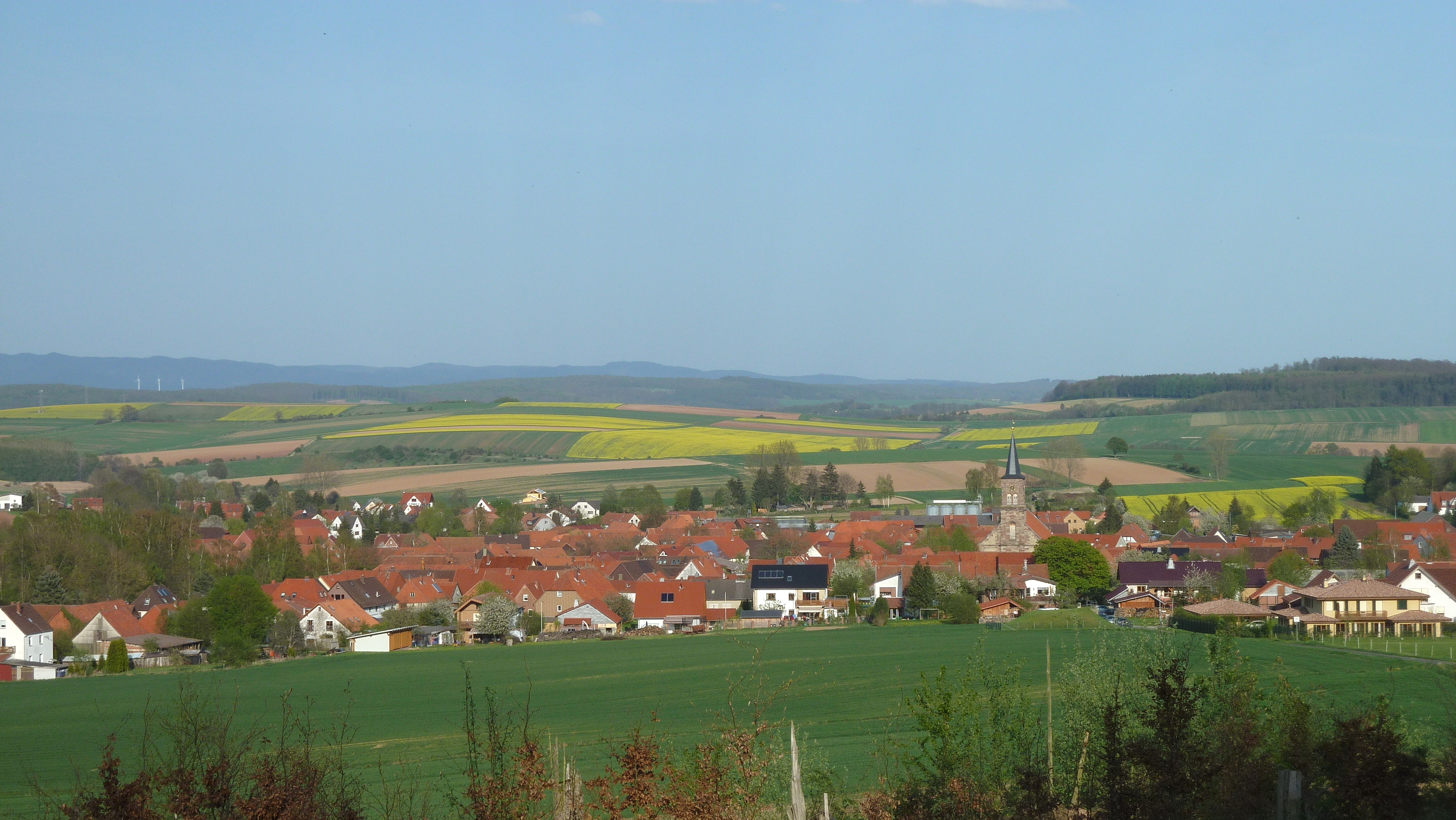
- Interactive map of Gillersheim
- Location within Germany Location within Lower Saxony
- Coordinates: 51°38′04″N 10°05′42″E
- Country: Germany
- State: Lower Saxony
- District: Northeim
- Municipality: Katlenburg-Lindau

Government
  - Mayor: Uwe Lebensieg (SPD)

Population (2021)
  - Total: 985
- Time zone: UTC+01:00 (CET)
  - Summer (DST): UTC+02:00 (CEST)
- Postal codes: 37191
- Dialling codes: 05556
- Vehicle registration: NOM
- Website: www.katlenburg-lindau.de

Gillersheim is a village with approximately 1,000 inhabitants in southern Lower Saxony. Gillersheim belongs to the Gemeinde (municipality) of Katlenburg-Lindau and to the Landkreis (district) of Northeim. The village celebrated 900 years of existence in 2005 and is known for its numerous social activities. The inhabitants are called “Kuckucks”.
