= Weende (Leine) =

River in Germany

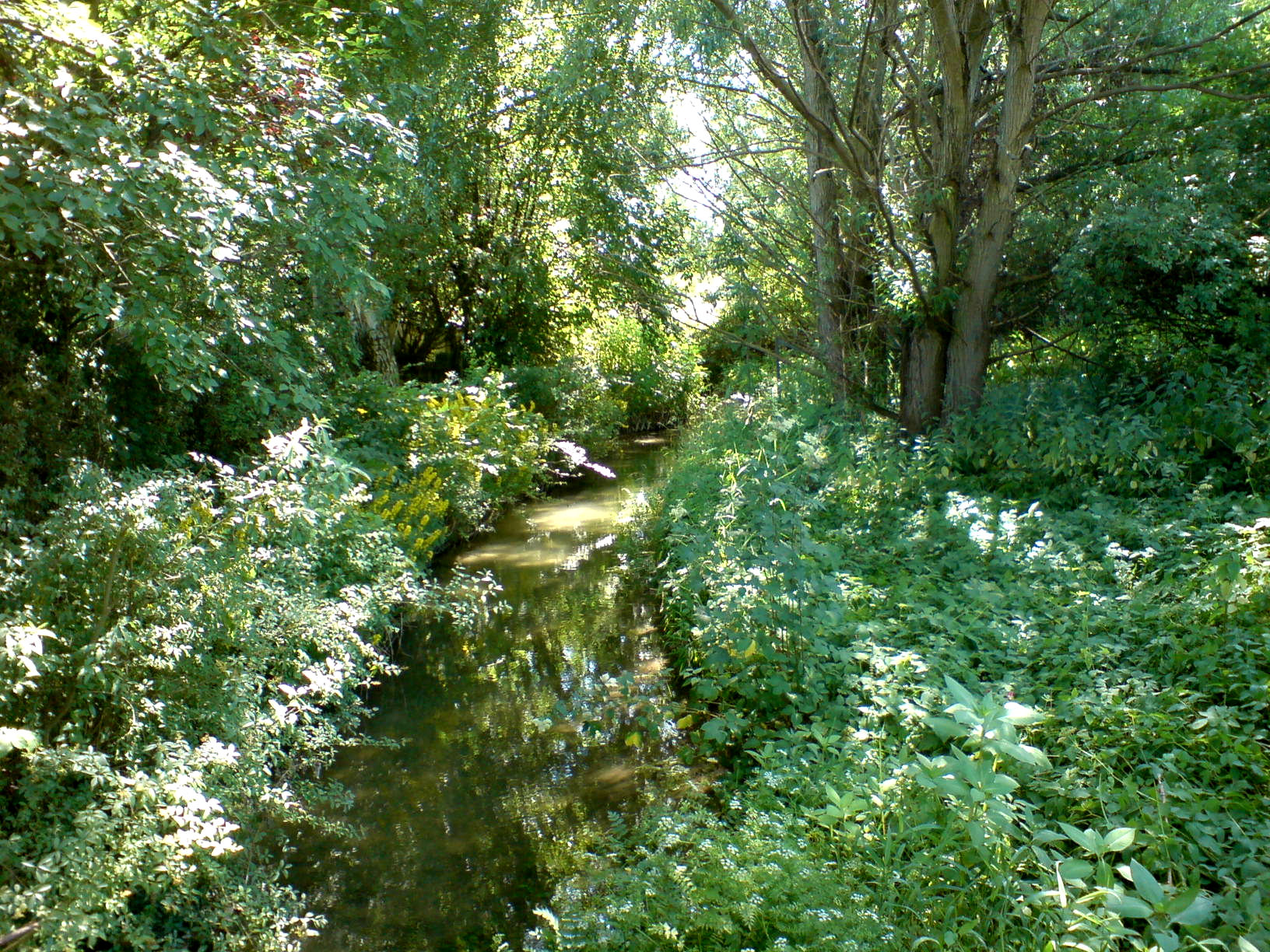

Location
- Country: Germany
- State: Lower Saxony

Physical characteristics
- Mouth
  - location: Leine
  - coordinates: 52.6223°N 9.9261°E

Basin features
- Progression: Leine→ Aller→ Weser→ North Sea

Weende is a small river of Lower Saxony, Germany. It flows into the Leine near Nörten-Hardenberg.

== See also ==
- List of rivers of Lower Saxony
