= Muthaus =

Dining building connected to a castle

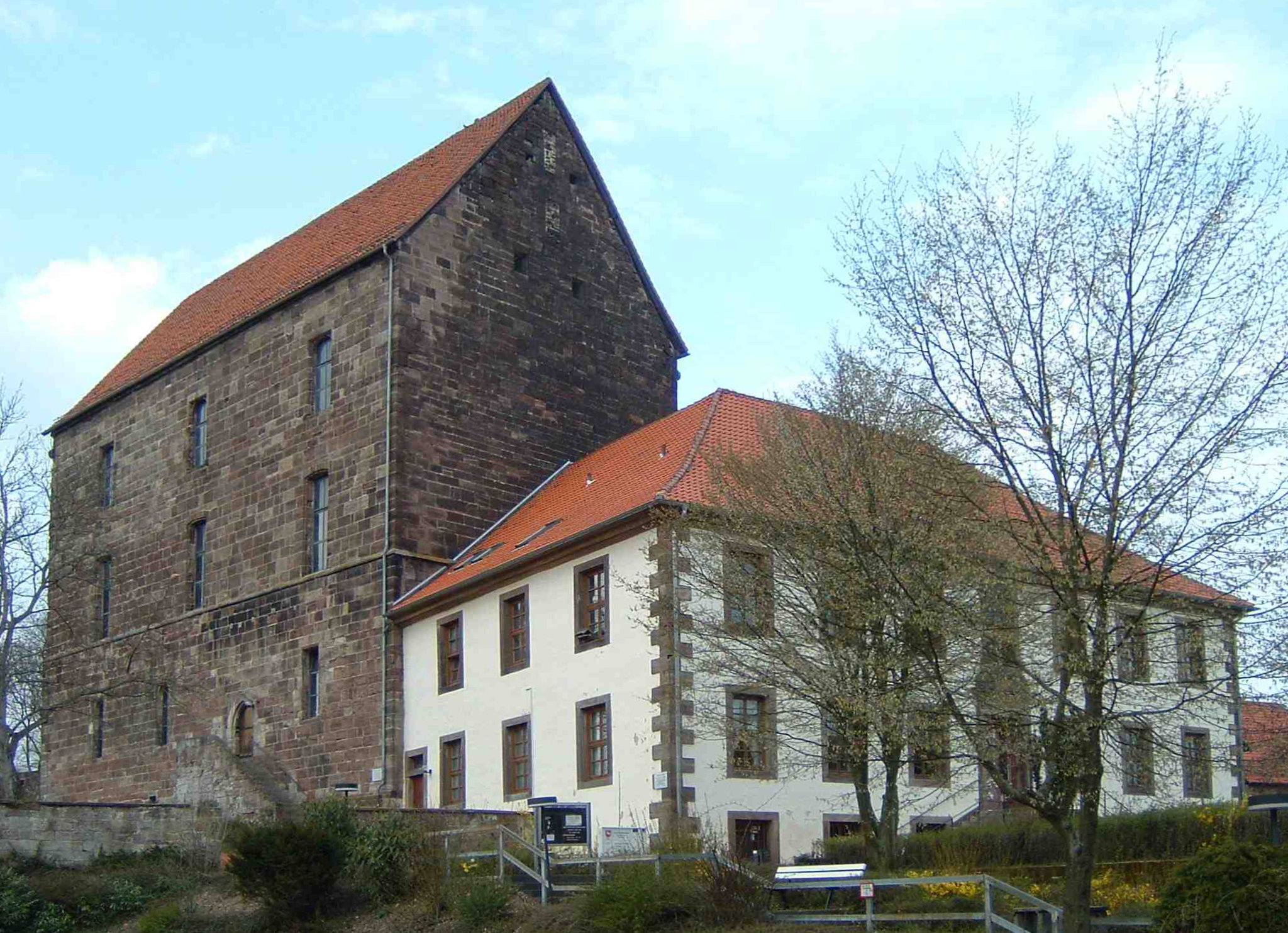
The Muthaus of Hardeg Castle in Hardegsen and the neighbouring Amtshaus

A Muthaus, also Mushaus or Moshaus (~palas) is the German term for a residential, storage or refectory (dining) building connected with a castle. It is sometimes also called a Turmhaus (literally: tower house).

In the 19th century German encyclopaedia, Meyers Konversationslexikon, under the entry for "castle" it states:

Next to the cabinet came the most important building of the royal castle, the Landgrave's House, also known as the palas (great hall), Mushaus (armoury) or hohes Haus ("big house"), which acted partly as a residence, but was mainly for the court and thus, apart from the cellars, kitchen and refectory, housed a great hall and an armorial hall on the ground and first floors used for gatherings and festive occasions and which was accessible from the courtyard by a perron.

An important function of a Muthaus was its role as a dining hall.

In South Lower Saxony and East Westphalia six such buildings have survived from the 14th century:

1. Hardeg Castle in Hardegsen, built in 1324. It is the oldest, profane structure of its size in the whole of Lower Saxony. The rectangular, over 30-metre-high building of ashlar blocks is especially well preserved. Formerly it was the main building of Hardeg Castle, later used as a grain store. Today it houses an event centre.
2. Lindau Castle in Lindau (Eichsfeld), probably built in 1322. Lindau Castle was destroyed in the Thirty Years' War; only the Mushaus has survived. Its walls are up to five metres thick.
3. Beverungen Castle in Beverungen. The castle was built in 1332 by the Principality of Paderborn. In 1632 it was almost totally destroyed by the Hessians, but was largely rebuilt in 1650. Since 1986 it has housed the chair museum.
4. Lichtenau Castle in Lichtenau (Westfalen)
5. Oldenburg in Marienmünster. The tower house (family castle of the counts of Schwalenberg) dates to the 2nd half of the 14th century.
6. Dreckburg Castle near Salzkotten, probably built between 1347 and 1357.
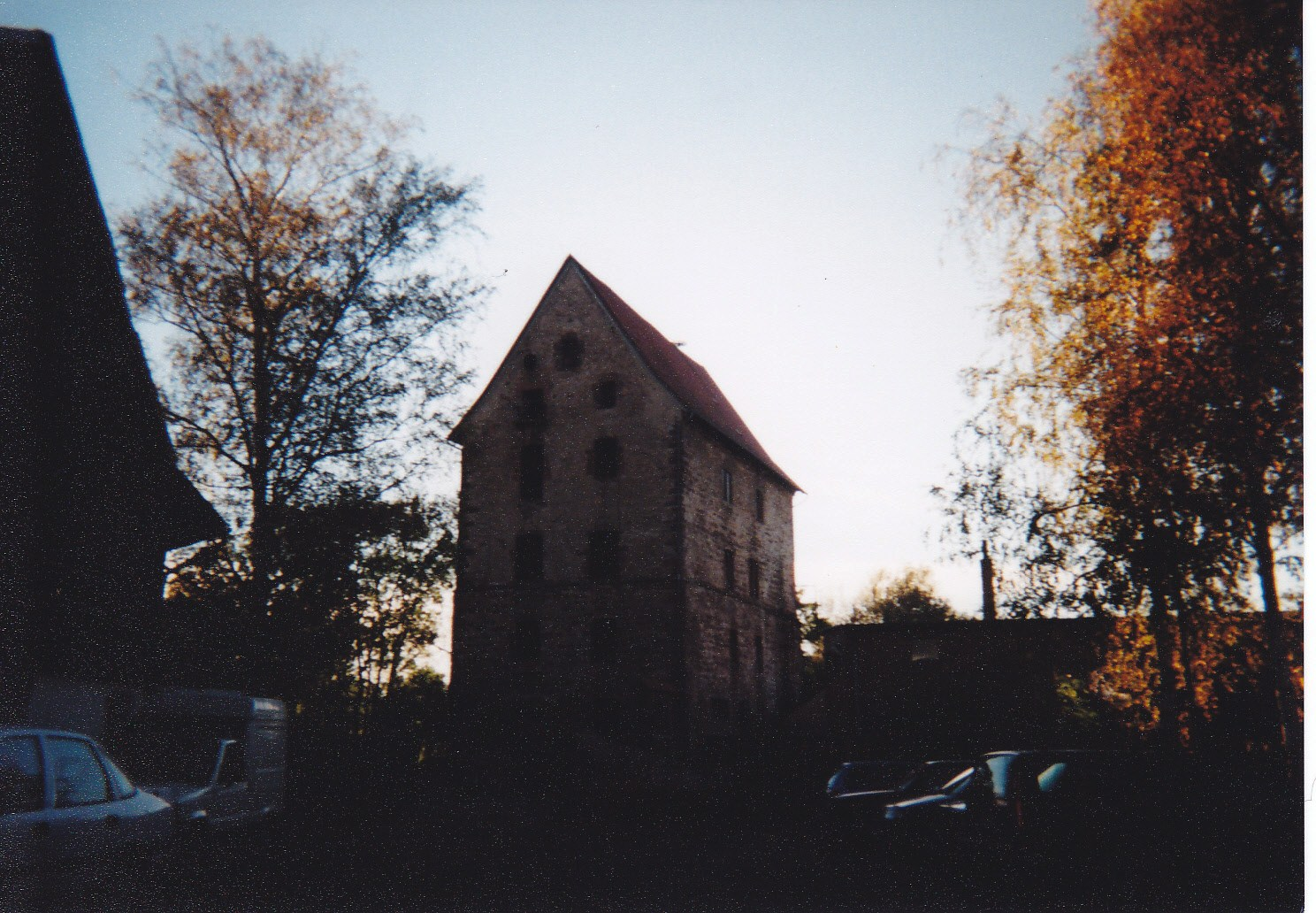
The Mushaus of Lindau Castle

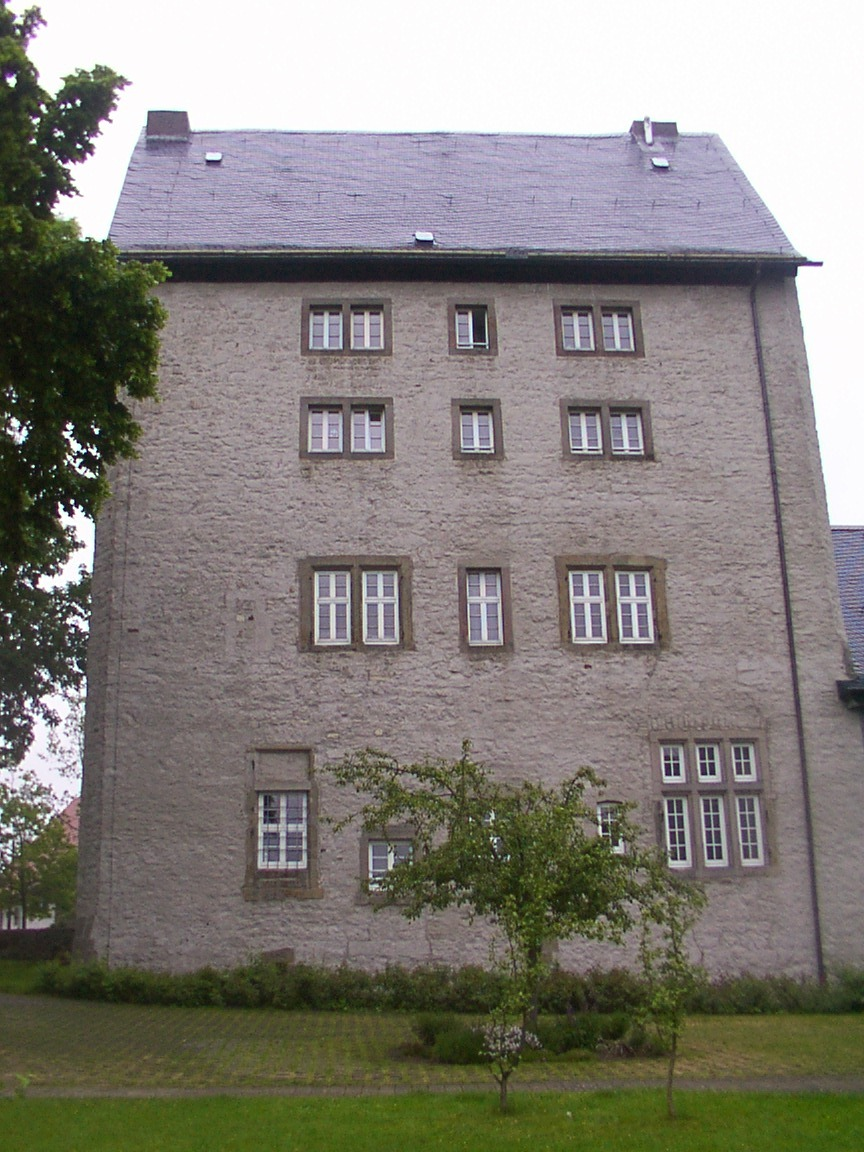
Tower house of Lichtenau Castle

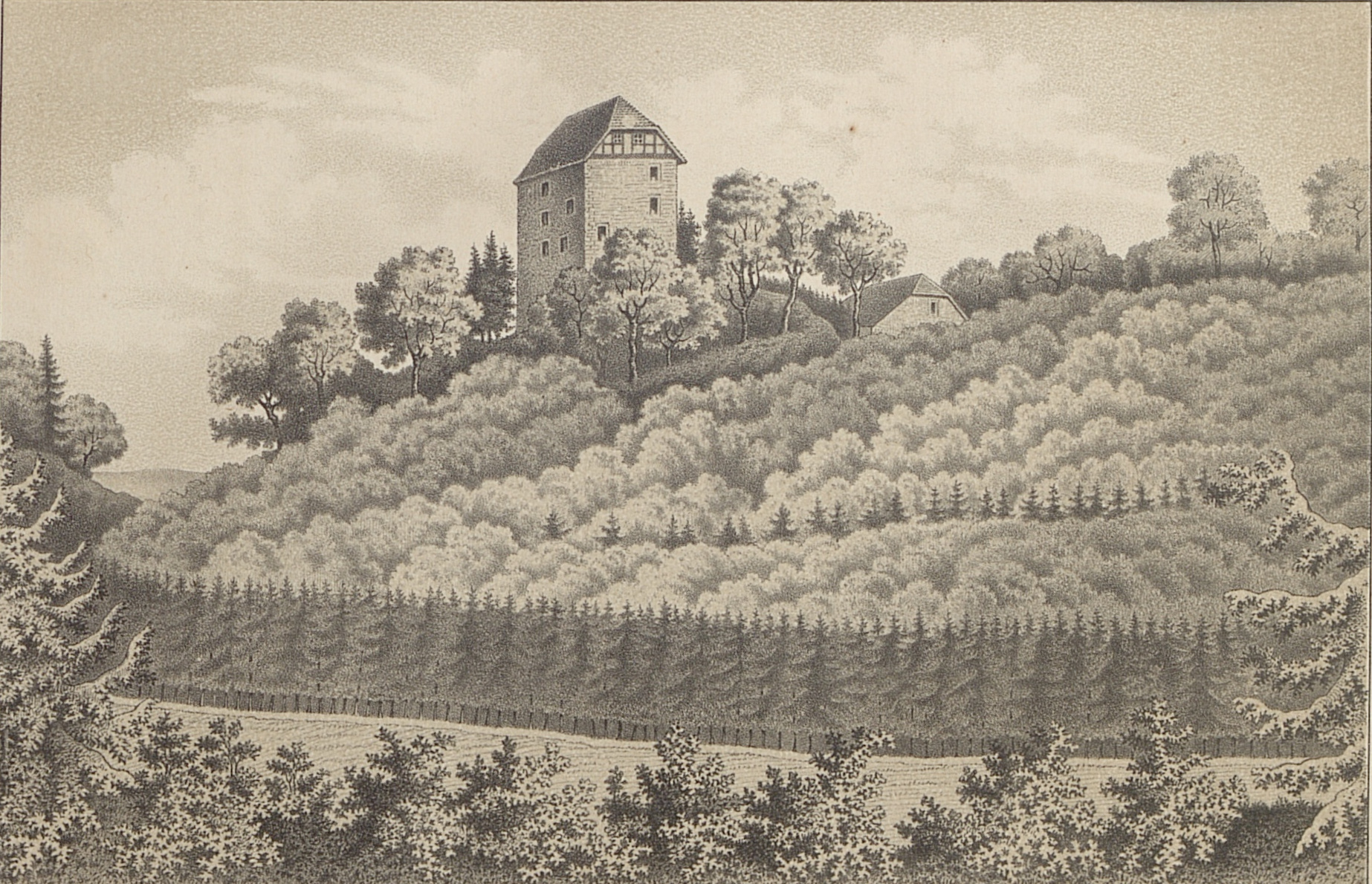
The Oldenburg near Marienmünster

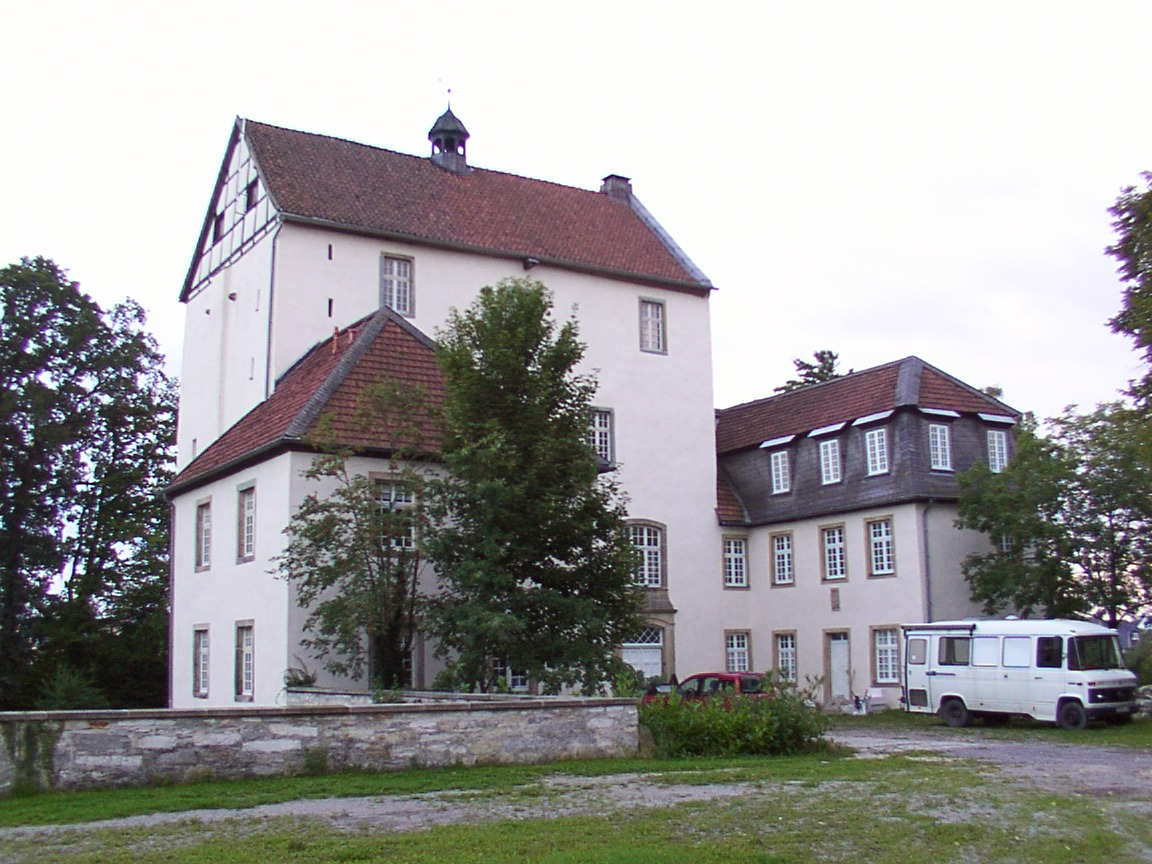
The Dreckburg near Salzkotten

A particularly fine example of a tower house is the 1508 lowland castle of Radolfshausen in Ebergötzen.

Tower-like houses are also found in Switzerland, e.g. the Turmhaus of Altenburg Castle.

== Literature ==
- Stadtverwaltung Hardegsen (publ.): Burg Hardegsen und das Muthaus. Geiger-Verlag, 2003, ISBN 3895708674
