= Katlenburg-Lindau =

- Municipality
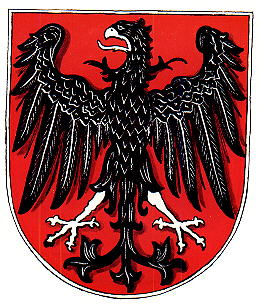
- Coat of arms

- Location of Katlenburg-Lindau within Northeim district
- Interactive map of Katlenburg-Lindau
- Location within Germany Location within Lower Saxony
- Coordinates: 51°40′57″N 10°5′57″E
- Country: Germany
- State: Lower Saxony
- District: Northeim
- Subdivisions: 7 Ortsteile

Government
  - Mayor (2021–26): Uwe Ahrens (Ind.)

Area
  - Total: 71.52 km^{2} (27.61 sq mi)
- Elevation: 139 m (456 ft)

Population (2025-12-31)
  - Total: 6,739
  - Density: 94.23/km^{2} (244.0/sq mi)
- Time zone: UTC+01:00 (CET)
  - Summer (DST): UTC+02:00 (CEST)
- Postal codes: 37191
- Dialling codes: 05552 oder 05556
- Vehicle registration: NOM
- Website: www.katlenburg-lindau.de

Katlenburg-Lindau (German pronunciation: [ˈkatlənbʊʁk ˈlɪndaʊ]; Eastphalian: Katelnborg-Lindau) is a municipality in the Landkreis (district) of Northeim in Lower Saxony, Germany. It is situated approximately 10 km southeast of Northeim, and 20 km northeast of Göttingen. Katlenburg-Lindau was formed on 1 March 1974 from the formerly independent communities of Katlenburg-Duhm, Gillersheim, Berka, Elvershausen, Wachenhausen, Suterode and Lindau. With the exception of Lindau, which had belonged Landkreis Duderstadt (itself formerly part of the Eichsfeld), these communities were part of Landkreis Northeim. The Max Planck Institute for Solar System Research (Max-Planck-Institut für Sonnensystemforschung) of the Max Planck Society was located in Lindau from 1946 to 2014, when it was moved to Göttingen. Until June 2004 the MPI was known as "Max-Planck-Institut für Aeronomie".

== Localities ==
- Berka
- Elvershausen
- Gillersheim
- Katlenburg
- Lindau
- Suterode
- Wachenhausen

== Politics ==
=== Municipal council ===
- CDU 9 Seats
- SPD 10 Seats
- FW 1 Seat

== Schools in Katlenburg-Lindau ==
- Burgbergschule (Katlenburg)
- Haupt- und Realschule (Lindau)

== Visitor attractions ==
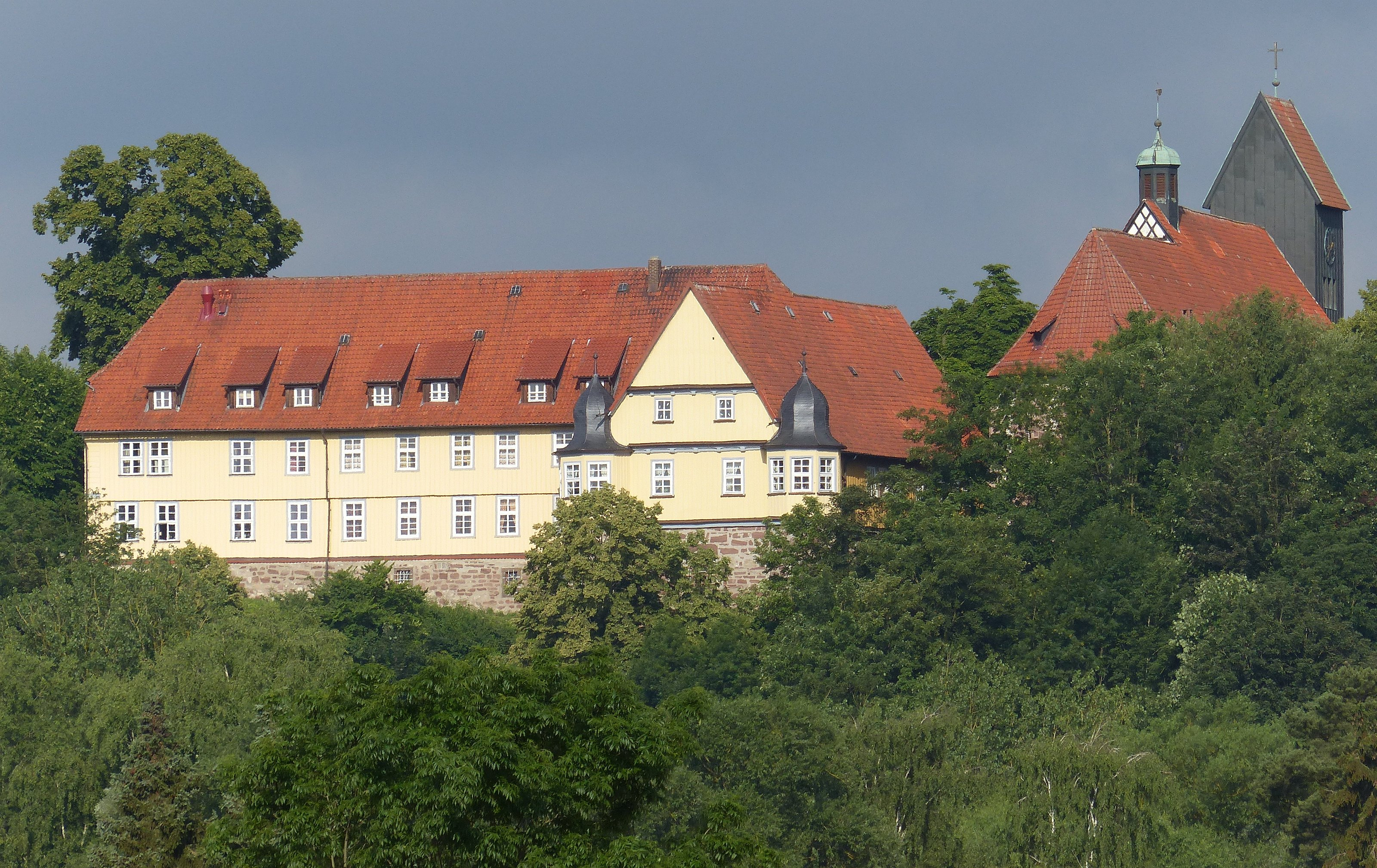
Castle Katlenburg

- Katlenburg: the castle after which the township of Katlenburg is named
- Mushaus in Lindau
- Mordmühle: an old mill in Lindau

== Churches ==
- St. Johannis Church
- Church of the Cross (Kreuzkirche, Lutheran, Lindau)
- St Peter and Paul's Church (Catholic, Lindau)
- Church of the Sacred Heart (Herz-Jesu, former catholic, Desecration in 2009, Katlenburg)

== Notable figures ==
- August Beuermann (born 14 December 1867 in Elvershausen; died 15 October 1930 in Hannover), German politician (DVP), MdR, MdL (Preußen)
- Wilfried Gleitze (born 8 September 1944 in Lindau), lawyer, first director of the Deutschen Rentenversicherung Westfalen (1987-2009), former vice-president of the Bundesversicherungsamt
- Michael Krieter (born 21 August 1963 in Northeim), former handball player
- Franz Mueller-Darß (born 29 April 1890 in Lindau; died 18 June 1976 in Lenggries, Upper Bavaria), Forstmeister and Standartenführer of the Waffen-SS
- Rolf Herrmann, former handball player

== Sister cities ==
- Binau, Germany
