= Wilhelm Lambrecht =

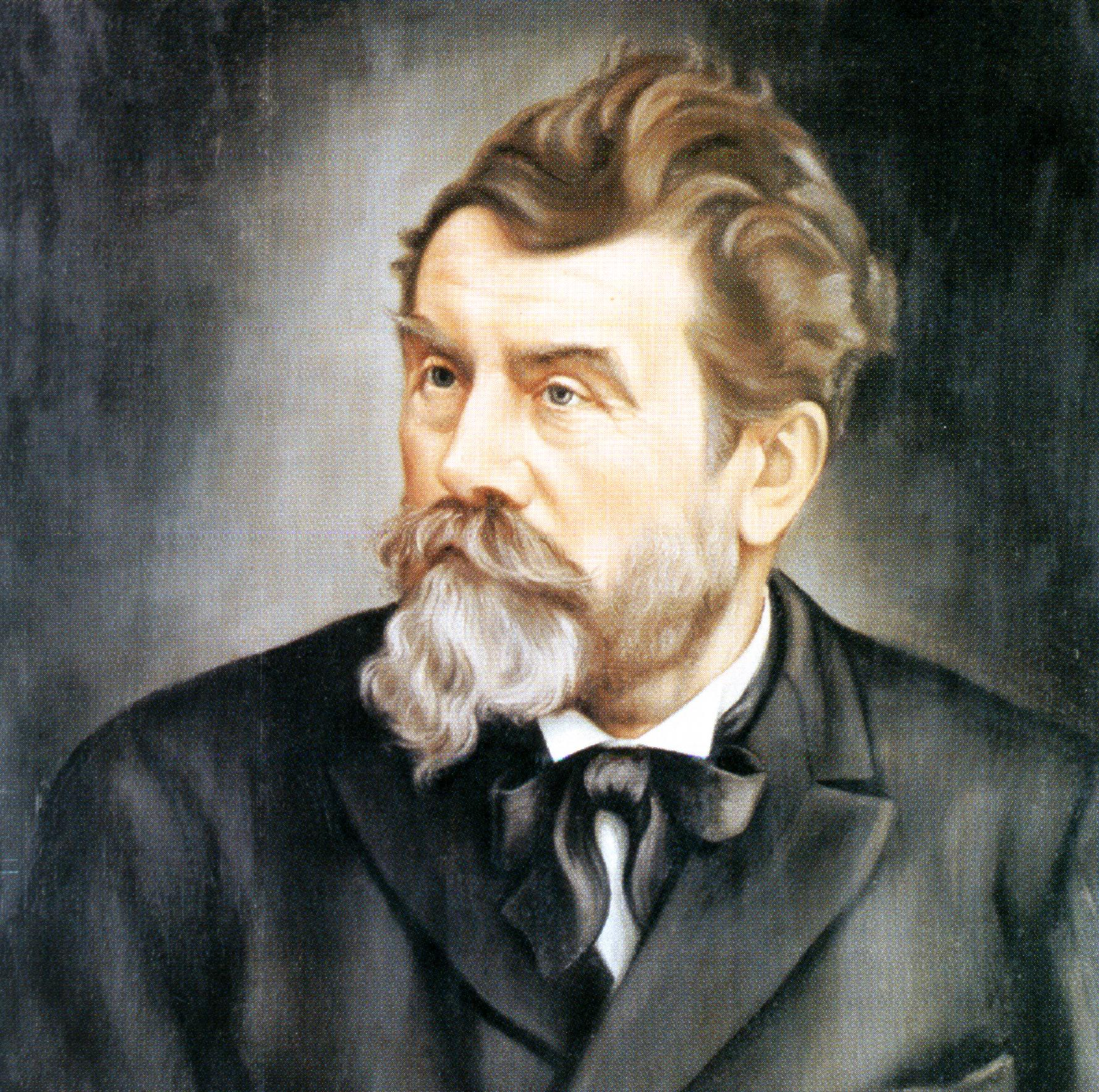
Portrait of Wilhelm Lambrecht

Wilhelm Lambrecht (3 August 1834, Wolbrechtshausen – 17 June 1904, Göttingen) was a German builder of measuring instruments.

After doing his exams Lambrecht began a five-year apprenticeship as a mechanic in Einbeck. The handling of the measuring instruments which were, despite their heaviness, less robust and built quite complicated and bulky at this time, sparked Lambrecht’s interest in instrument building and revealed his special talent during his apprenticeship. In the following five years of his journeyman's travel he worked in well-known factories in Paris and Berlin, then went back to Einbeck and went into business for himself. In 1864 he went to Göttingen, opened a factory and soon met the chemist Friedrich Wöhler and the physician L. Weber.

Lambrecht polymeter in Liberec

In 1867, when he came back from the world exhibition in Paris and brought the first chromic acid cell with him, he also met the astronomer Wilhelm Klinkerfues. Klinkerfues had developed a bifilar-hygrometer which was widely used but did not prove in laymen's hands. After that Lambrecht built a hair hygrometer, "Model Klinkerfues". In 1873, after separation from Klinkerfues, Lambrecht started to build new meteorological instruments such as polymeters, dew point monitors, and aspiration psychrometers. His weather telegraphs, weather columns and combinations of different meteorological instruments were in use at several bigger cities and foreign health resorts before World War I. Lambrecht also built medical thermometers. At the same time he developed the so-called minimum thermometer with a narrowing of the lumen of the capillary which is placed above the mercury container. His precision instruments are well-known all over the world.

- 24 July 1859: foundation of a fine mechanical factory in Einbeck
- 1867: invention of thermo-hygroscope (combination hair hygrometer and bimetal)
- 1875: invention of table hygrometer
- 1876: invention of standard barometer
- 1877: invention of polymeter
