= Hardegsen =

- Town
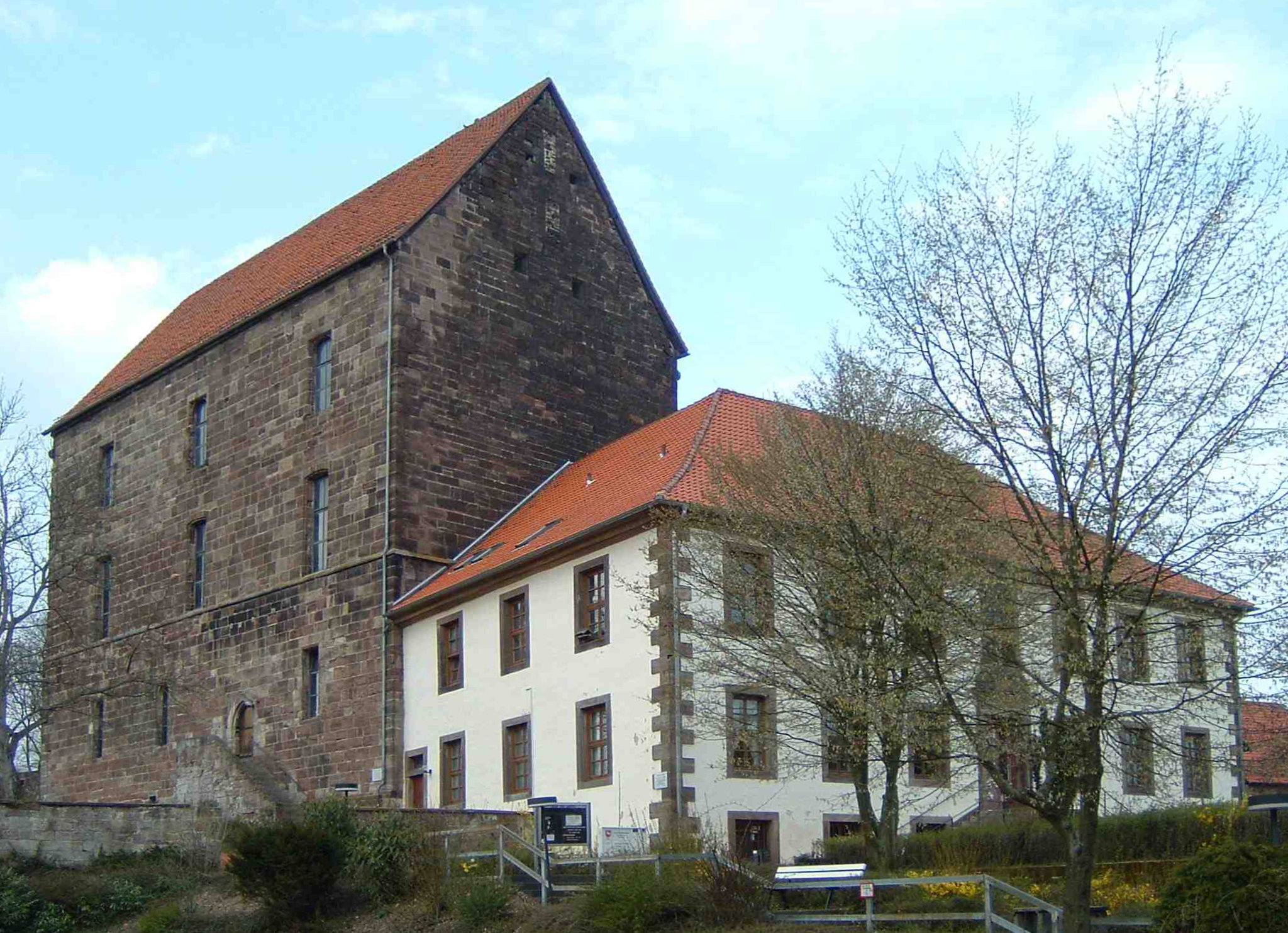
- Hardeg Castle

- Coat of arms

- Location of Hardegsen within Northeim district
- Interactive map of Hardegsen
- Location within Germany Location within Lower Saxony
- Coordinates: 51°39′08″N 09°49′46″E
- Country: Germany
- State: Lower Saxony
- District: Northeim

Government
  - Mayor (2021–26): Lars Gunnar Gärner (SPD)

Area
  - Total: 84.03 km^{2} (32.44 sq mi)
- Elevation: 191 m (627 ft)

Population (2025-12-31)
  - Total: 7,171
  - Density: 85.34/km^{2} (221.0/sq mi)
- Time zone: UTC+01:00 (CET)
  - Summer (DST): UTC+02:00 (CEST)
- Postal codes: 37181
- Dialling codes: 05505
- Vehicle registration: NOM, EIN, GAN
- Website: www.hardegsen.de

Hardegsen (German pronunciation: [ˈhaːɐ̯ˌdɛksn̩]) is a town in the district of Northeim, in Lower Saxony, Germany. It is situated approximately 15 km southwest of Northeim, and 15 km northwest of Göttingen.

Burg Hardeg is a medieval castle in Hardegsen. The castle was founded in the 12th century as a residence of the House of Welf. In the 1320 the stone castle was rebuilt by Conrad und Ludwig von Rosdorf. In the end of the 14th century the castle passed to Otto von Braunschweig zu Göttingen. From 1568 to 1823 it housed the local magistrate. In the end of the 18th century, Burg Hardeg, once a princely castle, was stripped of its former luxuries and converted into a farmhouse . In 1972 the business vacated the castle, and its management passed to the municipality and local preservation society.

== Transportation ==
Solling Railway connects Hardegsen with Northeim and the southern part of Solling-Vogler Nature Park.
