= Northeim (district) =

District in Lower Saxony, Germany

Coordinates: 51°45′N 9°50′E

- District
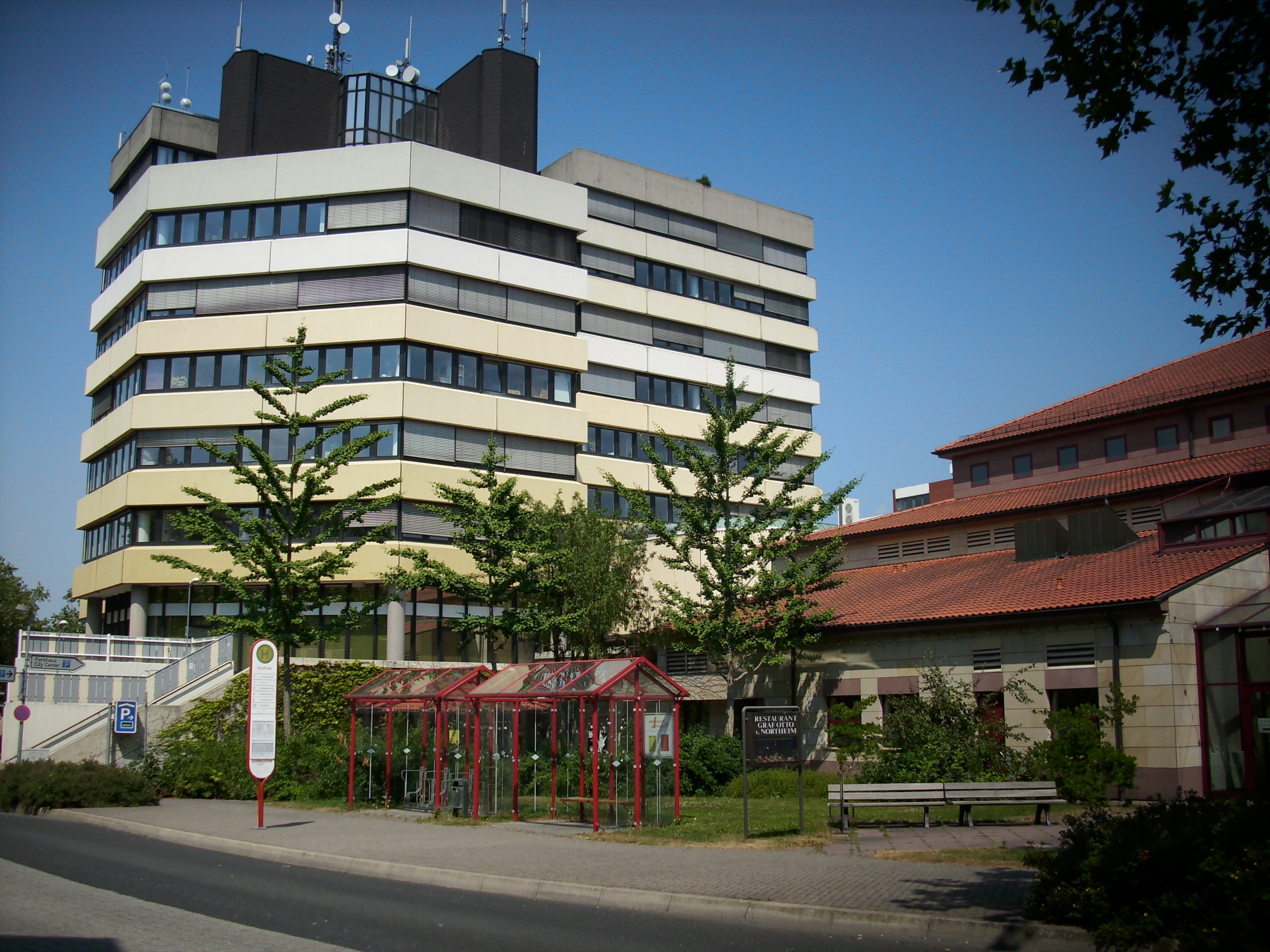

- Flag Coat of arms
- Country: Germany
- State: Lower Saxony
- Capital: Northeim

Government
  - District admin.: Astrid Klinkert-Kittel (SPD)

Area
  - Total: 1,267 km^{2} (489 sq mi)

Population (31 December 2025)
  - Total: 124,692
  - Density: 98.42/km^{2} (254.9/sq mi)
- Time zone: UTC+01:00 (CET)
  - Summer (DST): UTC+02:00 (CEST)
- Vehicle registration: NOM, EIN, GAN
- Website: landkreis-northeim.de

Northeim is a district in Lower Saxony, Germany. It is bounded by (from the northwest and clockwise) the districts of Holzminden, Hildesheim, Goslar and Göttingen, and the state of Hesse (district of Kassel).

== History ==
In medieval times the area had been part of the Duchy of Brunswick-Lüneburg. Later the majority of it belonged to Hanover and then Prussia. In 1885 the Prussian government created districts in the newly acquired provinces. In 1884 the districts of Einbeck, Northeim, and Uslar were established. Northeim and Uslar were merged in 1932, and they were again merged with Einbeck in 1974. The district's area was further enlarged in 1977, when some municipalities of neighbouring districts (Gandersheim and Osterode am Harz) joined the Northeim district.

== Geography ==
The district is located in the Weserbergland mountains. The Weser forms the western border of the district. Another river, the Leine, runs through the district from south to north. It is joined by the River Rhume which flows through the town of Northeim and the River Ilme which flows through the town of Einbeck.

== Coat of arms ==
The coat of arms displays two identical lions in blue and yellow, both representing the former two districts of Northeim and Uslar. The lion itself represents the duchy of Brunswick-Lüneburg.

== Towns and municipalities ==
Clickable map of towns and municipalities in the district

Towns
1. Bad Gandersheim
2. Dassel
3. Einbeck
4. Hardegsen
5. Moringen
6. Northeim
7. Uslar
Municipalities
1. Bodenfelde
2. Kalefeld
3. Katlenburg-Lindau
4. Nörten-Hardenberg

== See also ==
- Metropolitan region Hannover-Braunschweig-Göttingen-Wolfsburg
