= Drüber =

- Ortsteil of Einbeck
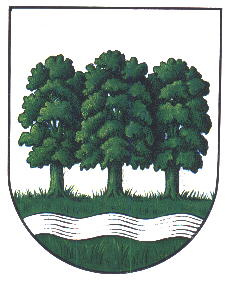
- Coat of arms
- Interactive map of Drüber
- Location within Germany Location within Lower Saxony
- Coordinates: 51°45′44″N 09°55′51″E
- Country: Germany
- State: Lower Saxony
- District: Northeim
- Town: Einbeck
- Elevation: 116 m (381 ft)

Population (2021)
  - Total: 456
- Time zone: UTC+01:00 (CET)
  - Summer (DST): UTC+02:00 (CEST)
- Postal codes: 37574
- Dialling codes: 05561
- Vehicle registration: NOM, EIN

Drüber is a southern suburb (Ortsteil) of the town of Einbeck, district Northeim. It has 456 inhabitants (2021).

== Geography ==
Drüber lies in southern Lower Saxony between the Harz and Solling Mountains. It is located 1 km west of the river Leine, at the western edge of the Leine Graben in the Leine Uplands. The village is immediately west of the nature reserve that is located in the flood retention basin Salzderhelden. It is situated roughly midway between the cities Einbeck and Northeim. The size of the village is 880 acres. Its neighboring villages are Sülbeck to the north, in the east Hohnstedt on the far side of the river Leine. South of Drüber is Stöckheim and Buensen is located to the west.

== History ==
Written records about Drüber start relatively late. In a deed from 1238 given by Otto I, Duke of Brunswick-Lüneburg a certain Ludolf von Drübere is mentioned. Due to its name it is thought that Drüber might be one of the oldest villages in the area. In 1886 a cooperative dairy was opened in Drüber by farmers from the villages around it. In 1970 that dairy was closed. On 1 December 1, 1962 a central school for the villages Buensen, Drüber, Hollenstedt, Immensen, and Sülbeck started operation. Before that time only single classroom schools were used in these villages. The school was enlarged over time and is still operating under the name "Leinetalschulen" (Leine-Valley-Schools).

On 1. March 1974 the village was incorporated into the city of Einbeck.

== Politics ==
=== Village Council Drüber/Sülbeck ===
Mayor of the village is Andreas Mann. The current legislative period started 2021.

There is a joint Village Council with Sülbeck. Election results for the Village Council in 2021 are:

- Wählergemeinschaft Drüber-Sülbeck Nine Seats

=== Coat of Arms of Drüber ===
The coat of arms shows three green trees above a canal (Salzgraben) that ran around Drüber to supply the salt works in Sülbeck with water.

== Literature ==
- Einbecker Geschichtsverein e. V. (Hrsg.): Einbecks Dörfer - Bilder aus vergangenen Zeiten. Duderstadt 1995. ISBN 3-923453-64-7 (in German)
