= Eicke's House =

Coordinates: 51°49′03″N 9°51′58″E

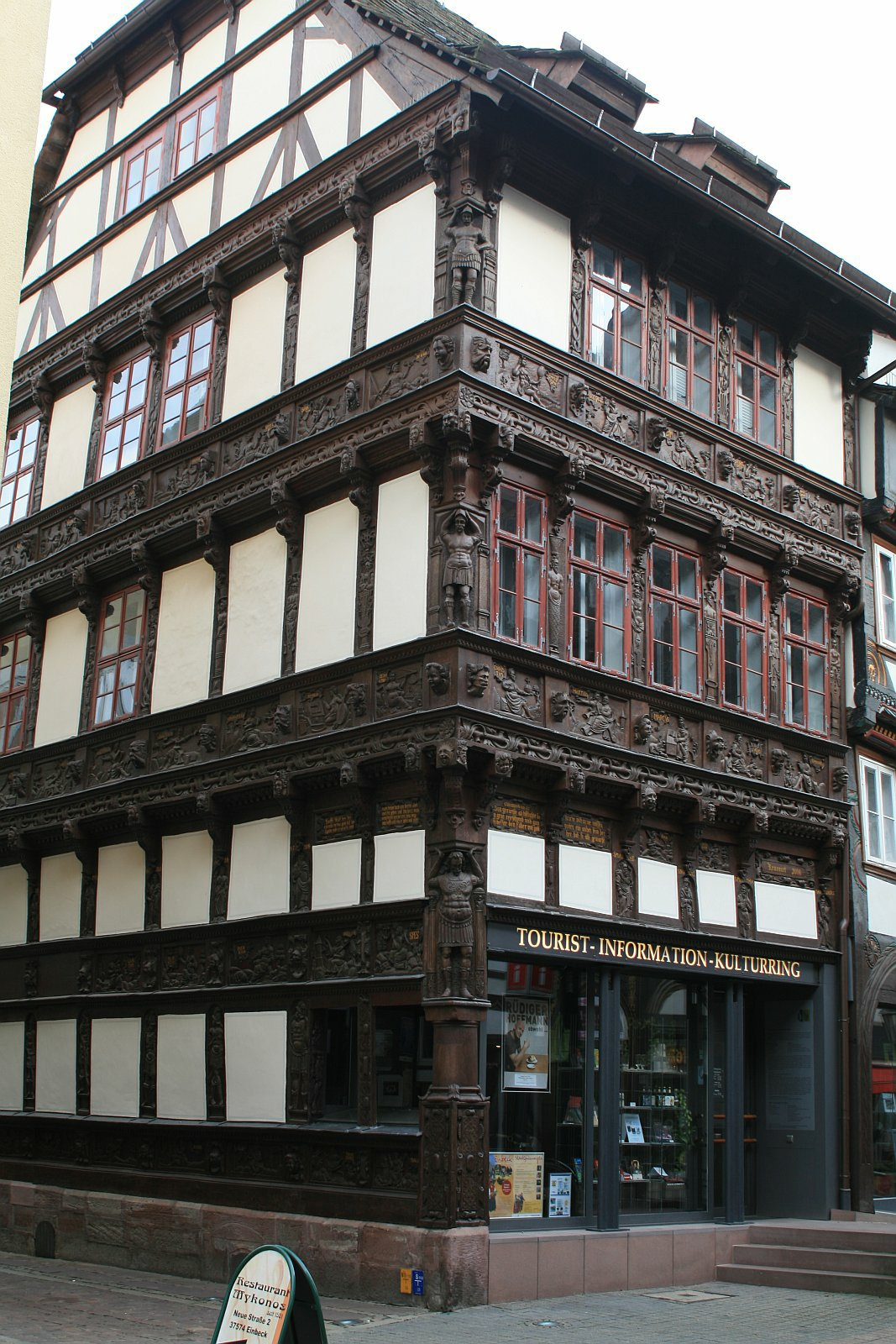
view after fundamental restoration of 2008

Eicke's House (German: Eickesches Haus) is a listed residential timber frame building in north German Renaissance style, located in the pedestrian zone of Einbeck, Germany.

It was built in 1612 and named after its early 1900s owner, Eicke. The structure features double jettying and rich sculptural facade ornamentation by an unknown 17th-century wood carver. Conservation efforts have been successful for most of the sculptures which include the Christian Apostles and Jesus Christ, the seven Liberal arts, the four cardinal virtues as well as some of the Greek muses. The building now houses the regional tourist information.
