= Salzderhelden saltworks =

Saltworks in Einbeck, Germany

Salzderhelden saltworks (German: Saline Salzderhelden) was a saline in Salzderhelden, a district of Einbeck city, Germany.

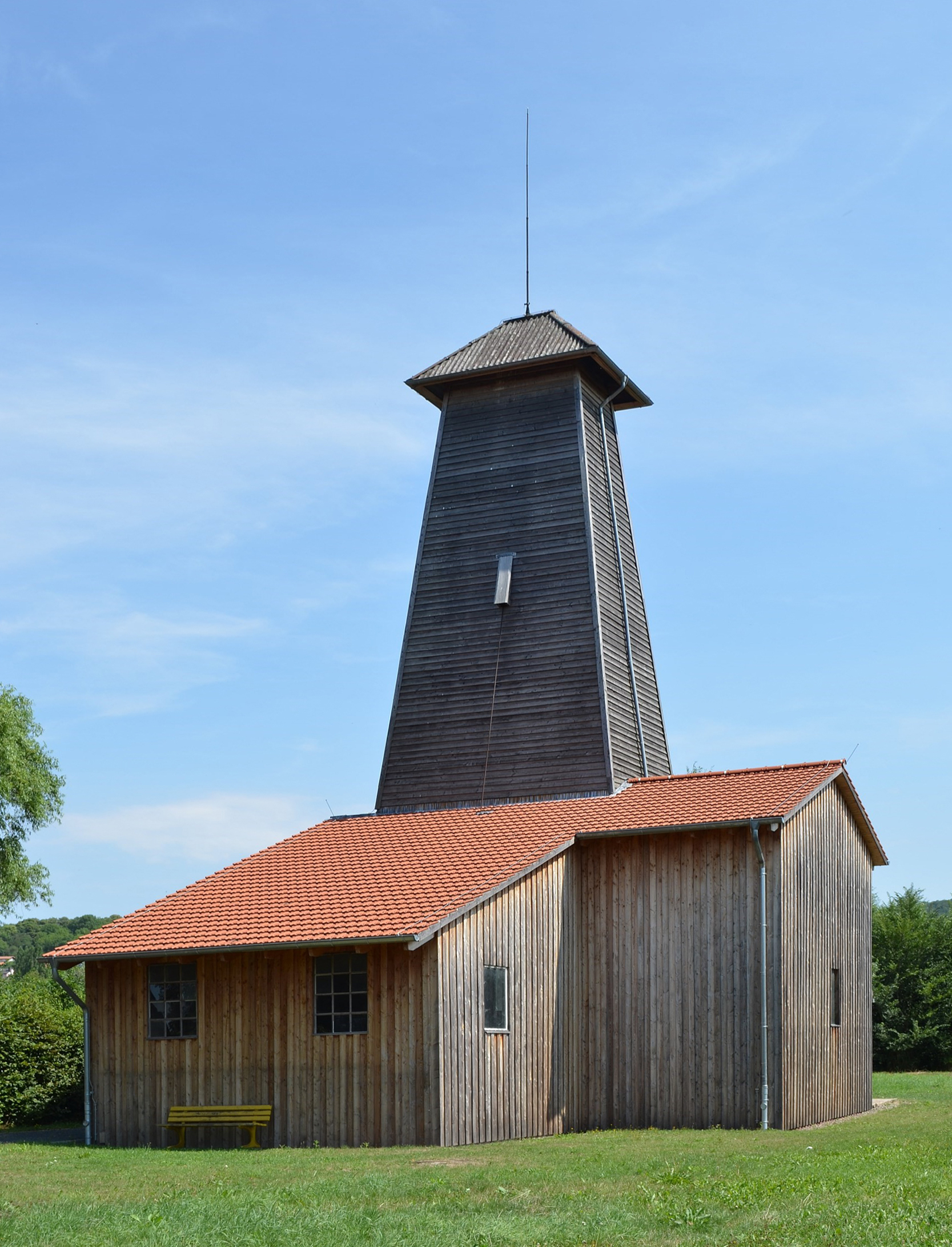
Salzderhelden saltworks featuring the 1884 derrick

== History ==
The start of salt extraction at the site began in 1757. A brine spring had been discovered in the proximity much earlier, in the medieval ages. That was feasible because a Zechstein layer is located in the ground. A graduation tower was built in 1772. From 1851 on balneotherapy was offered for guests. In 1860 a drilling for brine was set as deep as 450m into the ground, replacing the graduation tower. Also, a steam engine was installed to lift the brine to the surface. The steam engine replaced wind mills that had been in use until then. A second derrick was built in 1884. An electrical pump replaced the steam engine in 1920. Power transmission was achieved by line shaft. In the 20th century the facility was shut down, but the drilling tower was preserved and is an industrial heritage nowadays.

== Museum ==
The power transmission devices were refurbished in 2009. In 2011 the site with its 19th century buildings including the derrick, the engine house and the wooden brine tank was reopened as museum, open for guided tours.

== Literature ==
- Bastian Sauthoff: Weißes Gold und vergessene Technik. In: Salzderheldener Geschichtsblätter, Band 1, 2009
- Friedrich Otte: Das Salzwerk und die Salzgewerkschaft von Salzderhelden, Einbeck, 1918
- G. Paulig, F. Otte: Geschichte der Saline Salzderhelden, (alte Salzwerk-Kunst), 1984
- F . Otte: Der alte Solbrunnen in Salzderhelden, in : Die Spinnstube 1927, Nr . 5, pp. 65
- Ernst Engels: Geschichte der Saline Salzderhelden, in: Zeitschrift für Bergrecht 22, 1881, p. 328-351
