= Einbeck =

- Town
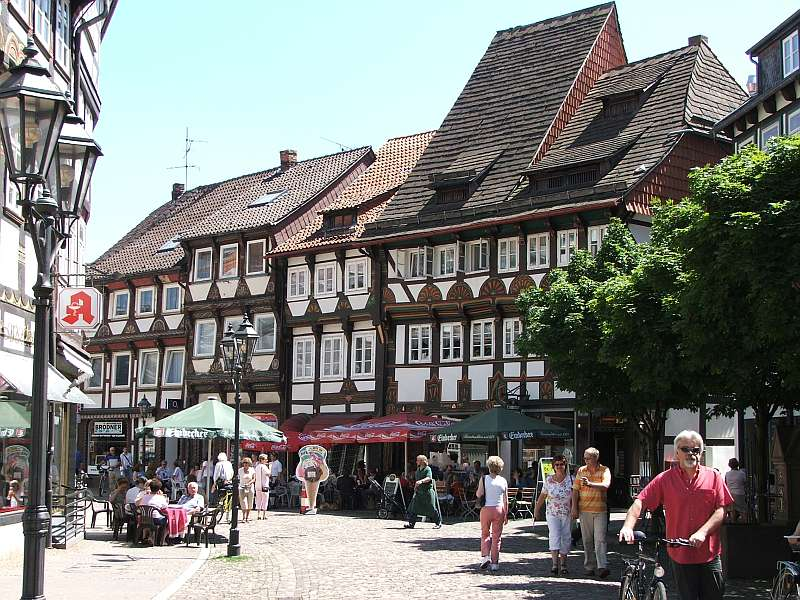
- Street with timbered houses in Einbeck

- Coat of arms

- Location of Einbeck within Northeim district
- Interactive map of Einbeck
- Location within Germany Location within Lower Saxony
- Coordinates: 51°49′N 9°52′E
- Country: Germany
- State: Lower Saxony
- District: Northeim

Government
  - Mayor (2020–25): Sabine Michalek (Ind.)

Area
  - Total: 231.92 km^{2} (89.54 sq mi)
- Elevation: 112 m (367 ft)

Population (2025-12-31)
  - Total: 29,472
  - Density: 127.08/km^{2} (329.13/sq mi)
- Time zone: UTC+01:00 (CET)
  - Summer (DST): UTC+02:00 (CEST)
- Postal codes: 37574
- Dialling codes: 05561, 05562, 05563, 05565
- Vehicle registration: EIN, GAN, NOM
- Website: www.einbeck.de

Einbeck (German pronunciation: [ˈaɪnbɛk]; Eastphalian: Aimbeck) is a town in the district Northeim, in southern Lower Saxony, Germany, on the German Timber-Frame Road.

== History ==
=== Prehistory ===
The area of the current city of Einbeck is inhabited since prehistoric times. Various artifacts have been unearthed in the city of Einbeck itself and in the little villages and lost villages around it over the years. They date back to the Paleolithic Era.

=== Medieval period ===
In the Early Middle Ages a number of villages existed along the river Ilme in the middle Leine valley before Einbeck was founded. On January 1, 1158 Einbeck was first mentioned in a deed of Friedrich Barbarossa, which mentioned … in loco qui Einbike vocatur …. and related to a transfer of an estate in the 11th century. Count Udo of Katlenburg owned an estate on the bank of a brook, the Krummes Wasser (crooked water). His grandson founded the stift Sankt Alexandri, that subsequently developed into an important sanctuary. On the other side of this brook a market town developed at the end of the 12th century, mainly due to convenient access for traffic. A church was built there as well, the market church (St. Jacob). The floodplain between market and stift was filled in and covered with buildings. The market and stift were walled in and a moat was built. In 1252 Einbeck received a town charter and a town council was established. In 1279 the town received through its sovereign, Heinrich Mirabilis, an extension of its town charter. Einbeck was topographically extended and a town wall is mentioned that enclosed the market church St. Jacob and the stift St. Alexandri. St Jacob was (and is) located in the center of the city around the 'old market', St. Alexandri was built only some hundred meters away. Extensions were called the 'new market', first mentioned 1389 as was the 'new town'. The new town received its own church, St. Mary, first mentioned 1318.

==== Beer ====
The city gained importance during the reign of the dukes of Grubenhagen. Smaller villages as Oldendorf or Tiedexen were deserted and inhabitants moved inside the city walls. Written evidence about the export of Einbecker beer dates back to 1351. The beer was brewed in larger houses that had the entitlement to brew. These houses are still easily identified through their arched wide doors, necessary to move in the brewing kettle, called a brewing pan. The organization of the process and the marketing of the beer was led by the city council. Einbeck joined the Hanse in 1368 thus broadening the distribution area which now reached from Antwerp in the west to Riga in the east and from Stockholm in the north to Munich in the south. In Munich the name Einbeck was mispronounced as "oan bock" (a billy goat), and when the ducal brewhouse copied the taste, Bock style beer was born.

==== Monasteries ====
In the 14th and 15th centuries a number of monasteries were created: Sisters of Maria and Magdalen, an Austin hermit monastery, and a monastery of the Order of the Poor Ladies. A system of sconces and towers were built outside the city walls as an early warning system against enemies. This time was a golden age for Einbeck and it was one of the largest cities in Northern Germany.

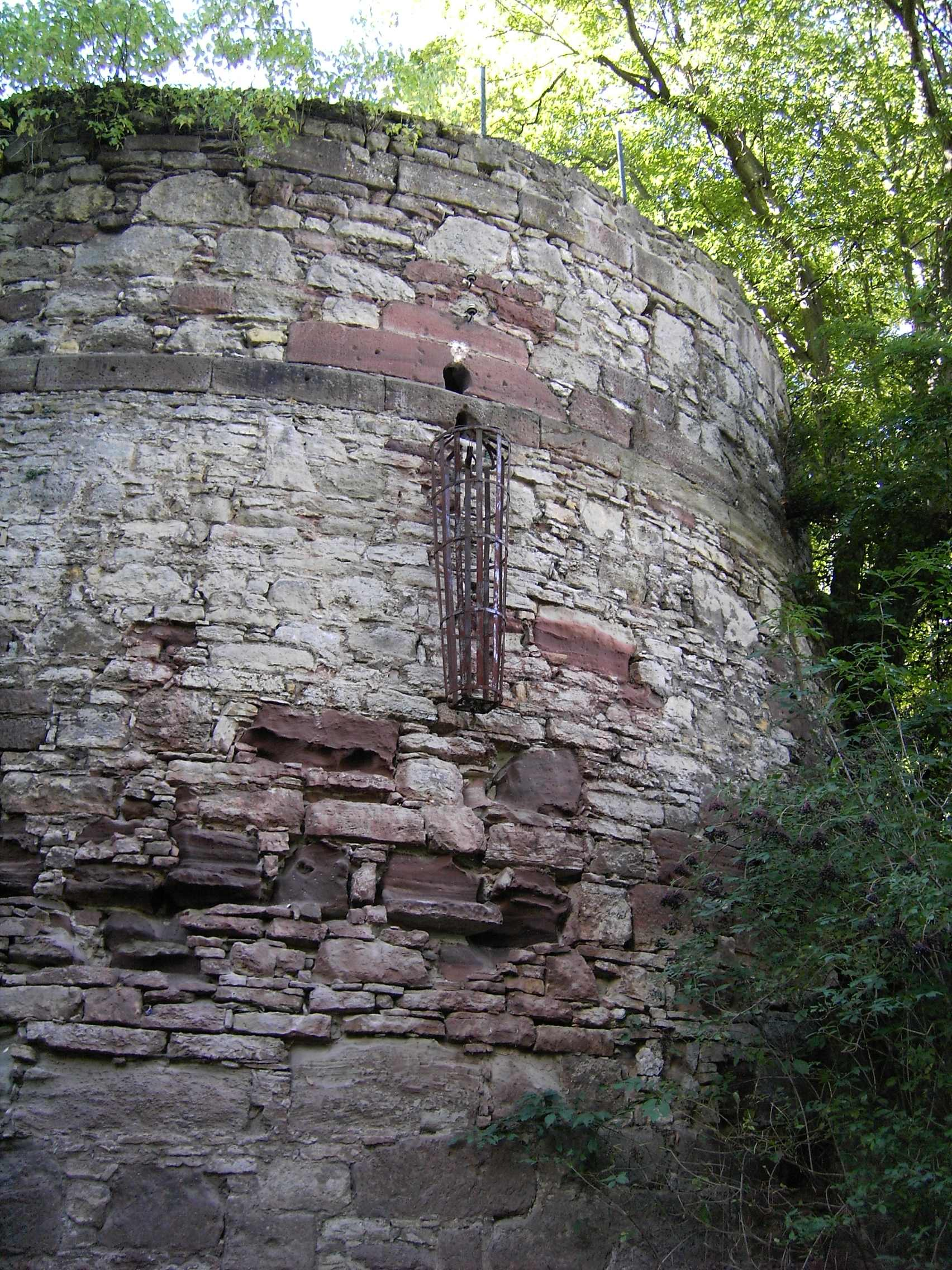
Diek Tower with replica cage

=== Modern period ===
In July 1540 the city of Einbeck was nearly completely destroyed by a fire, which was started by an arsonist. What role the religious upheaval following the very recently introduced reformation played is unknown. Convicted of the crime, the arsonist, Heinrich Diek, was tortured and died while being publicly displayed in an iron cage. This cage is still on display in the town hall. As the town had been quite wealthy before the fire, it was rebuilt very fast. Einbeck joined the Schmalkaldic League, a system of military defence of Lutheran princes and cities, which was a very costly exercise. In 1549 a fire once again swept through the city. This time the southern part of the city was mainly affected and 580 houses burned down. In 1580 the city council signed the Formula of Concord which completed reformation. In 1597 the plague took a huge death toll. During the Thirty Years' War the city was occupied by enemy troops during 1632 and 1641 and some hundred houses destroyed. During the Seven Years' War, (known as the French and Indian War in North America), the city gates were taken down and most of the city walls were destroyed.

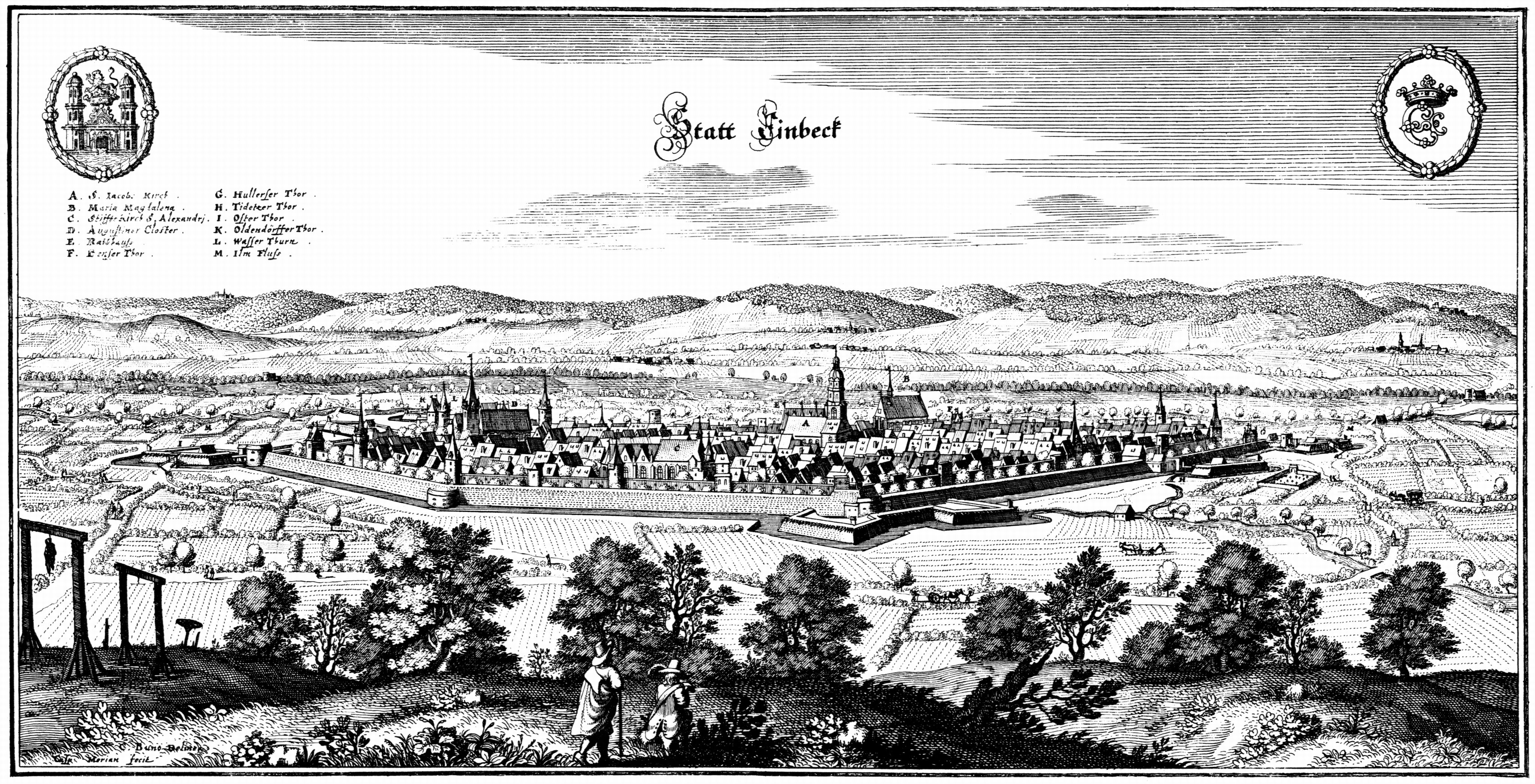
Etching by Matthäus Merian of the City of Einbeck after Buno dated 1654

This all led to times of economic and political vulnerability. As the neighbouring village Rotenkirchen developed into the administrative seat of the area, its sovereign was able to curb the autonomy of Einbeck. Later Einbeck became a garrison for infantry units, which eased its economic difficulties. During the Napoleonic Wars it became the administrative seat of the district of Einbeck from 1807 to 1813. In 1826 the area around St. Maria burned down, replaced by a new county courthouse “Amtsgericht”. After Prussia won the war against the Kingdom of Hannover in 1866, barracks for the Prussian Army were built, now the 'New Town Hall' and administrative building of the city council. Einbeck initially resisted plans to connect itself to the railway line Hannover – Kassel, but in 1879 a line between Salzderhelden and Einbeck was built. In 1885 Einbeck was made seat of the newly formed county of Einbeck. Beginning in 1890 the bicycle manufacturing and trading company of August Stukenbrok developed into the largest mail order business in Germany, although it later went into receivership during The Great Depression in 1931. In 1896 the garrison was closed and the building used as a technical college until 1907.

Einbeck was hit hard by the economic difficulties following the end of World War I, and from 1930 on, its citizens leaned toward non-democratic parties. During the last free vote before Hitler took power, the National Socialists (NSDAP) had a share of 40.9% of the electorate in Einbeck. During the pogrom of November 1938 NSDAP followers set fire to the Synagogue in the Bismarckstraße. Of the 58 Jewish citizens of Einbeck; 21 emigrated outside of Germany, 32 were killed or died of disease in concentration camps, three committed suicide, and five have not been able to be traced. A month before German surrender, the city manager of Einbeck (without permission from his superiors) gave over the city to United States troops on April 9, 1945. This helped Einbeck to survive the war physically undamaged.

In 1946, the population of Einbeck doubled through the influx of displaced persons from the former Eastern territories of Germany, mainly from Silesia. This led to a boom in the construction of new residential houses and later, industrial buildings as well. Residential housing expanded the city in an easterly direction, while industrial building grew to the south. Some substantial companies did set up shop in Einbeck, the largest today (2023) being KWS.

In 1971 the villages Holtensen, Hullersen, Immensen, and Odagsen were incorporated into the city of Einbeck, while the county of Einbeck was disbanded in 1974. At the same time Einbeck incorporated further 27 villages from the old counties of Einbeck, Gandersheim, and Northeim. Einbeck is as of 2013 administratively a 'Medium Centre', which means it provides services like high school, hospital‚ notary public, local court, etc. In 2005 a fire destroyed one historical building and damaged five more. Seven years later two more heritage-listed buildings were destroyed by fire.

On October 19, 2011, the city council adopted a resolution to incorporate the neighbouring community of Kreiensen beginning January 1, 2013. Einbeck therefore is the legal successor of Kreiensen and it grew substantially again in terms of territory and population.

== Geography ==
Einbeck has 46 municipalities, which were previously independent villages. The city lies directly south of the Hube (hills), where the Ilme flows into the Leine. In January 2013, the former municipality Kreiensen joined Einbeck.

=== Climate ===
Climate data for Einbeck
Month	Jan	Feb	Mar	Apr	May	Jun	Jul	Aug	Sep	Oct	Nov	Dec	Year
Daily mean °C (°F)	0.1 (32.2)	0.6 (33.1)	3.8 (38.8)	8.1 (46.6)	12.7 (54.9)	16.0 (60.8)	17.4 (63.3)	17.0 (62.6)	13.9 (57.0)	9.5 (49.1)	4.8 (40.6)	1.5 (34.7)	8.8 (47.8)
Average rainfall mm (inches)	52.6 (2.07)	36.4 (1.43)	45.2 (1.78)	51.3 (2.02)	64.4 (2.54)	76.7 (3.02)	64.5 (2.54)	60.9 (2.40)	44.6 (1.76)	40.6 (1.60)	49.4 (1.94)	57.3 (2.26)	644.1 (25.36)
Mean monthly sunshine hours	33.9	59.6	96.5	140.2	174.4	174.7	174.1	175.0	124.3	90.2	45.1	29.5	1,317.5
Source: DWD

== Economy ==
Einbeck had various industries over time that came and went. Yet from very early on beer has been the product Einbeck is famous for over many centuries, still sold under the brand Einbecker Bier. Einbeck is the birthplace of bock beer, a beer with a high alcohol content. In medieval times a brewmaster from Einbeck was hired to brew „Einpöckisch Bier“ in Munich. The name was corrupted and developed into „Oanpock“, and subsequently into „Bock“. The export of beer was a very important business so that in the harbour city of Hamburg Einbeck had its own distribution center (and pub), called the Eimbeck'sches Haus. A brewery is still operating in Einbeck under the name Einbecker Brewery. The company is listed on the Hanover Stock Exchange.

Another business in Einbeck has a very long tradition: Einbecker Blaudruck, a traditional way to print on fabric. The privately owned business was founded in 1638 and is the oldest business of the kind still in existence in Europe.

A worldwide business headquartered in Einbeck is KWS SAAT AG, listed in the German SDAX. It grew out of breeding seed for sugar beet and is now a full line seed supplier to the farming industry worldwide. KWS operates more than 60 subsidiaries worldwide with sales of close to 1 billion € and a total of 3,800 employees. The main research and development activities are based in Einbeck.

Kayser Automotive Systems is an international supplier of components for the car industry. Kayser is a family business headquartered in Einbeck. A branch of the car component supplier Dura Automotive Systems is active in Einbeck. E. Oppermann is a family controlled international belt webbing manufacturer. The chain manufacturer Renold has its German subsidiary in Einbeck. Kurt König is a service and sales company for building and construction machinery.

== Politics ==
=== City council ===
A by-election was held on 20 January 2013 for the city council and all village councils due to the incorporation of the former community of Kreiensen into the city of Einbeck. The results were as follows:

Party	Seats 2013	Seats 2011	Seats 2006
SPD	19	14	16
CDU	14	9	14
UWG-Gemeinsam für Einbeck	4	8	—
BL-Unabhängige Wählergemeinschaft Kreiensen	3	—	—
GRÜNE	2	2	1
FDP	2	2	4
LINKE	—	1	1

=== Former city managers ===
- 1948–1981 Heinrich Keim
- 1981–1992 Georg Lampe
- 1992–1997 Bernd Röll

=== Full-time mayors ===
- 1 January 1998 until 31 October 2006: Martin Wehner (SPD)
- 1 November 2006 until 24 January 2013: Ulrich Minkner (SPD)
- since 24 January 2013: Sabine Michalek (CDU)

== Suburbs ==
Of the 32,000 inhabitants of Einbeck only about 15,000 live in the city of Einbeck, the next largest suburb is Kreiensen with about 2,500 inhabitants. The city of Einbeck began to incorporate the first neighbouring villages in 1971, a larger batch followed in 1974. In 2013 Einbeck incorporated Kreiensen which itself had previously incorporated 15 villages. So the geographical size of Einbeck is unusually large. In total Einbeck has 46 suburbs since 2013:

- Ahlshausen-Sievershausen
- Andershausen
- Avendshausen
- Bartshausen
- Bentierode
- Beulshausen
- Billerbeck
- Bruchhof
- Brunsen
- Buensen
- Dassensen
- Dörrigsen
- Drüber
- Edemissen
- Erzhausen
- Garlebsen
- Greene
- Haieshausen
- Hallensen
- Holtensen
- Holtershausen
- Hullersen
- Iber
- Immensen
- Ippensen
- Kohnsen
- Kreiensen
- Kuventhal
- Naensen
- Negenborn
- Odagsen
- Olxheim
- Opperhausen
- Orxhausen
- Rengershausen
- Rittierode
- Rotenkirchen
- Salzderhelden
- Strodthagen
- Stroit
- Sülbeck
- Vardeilsen
- Vogelbeck
- Voldagsen
- Volksen
- Wenzen

== Culture ==
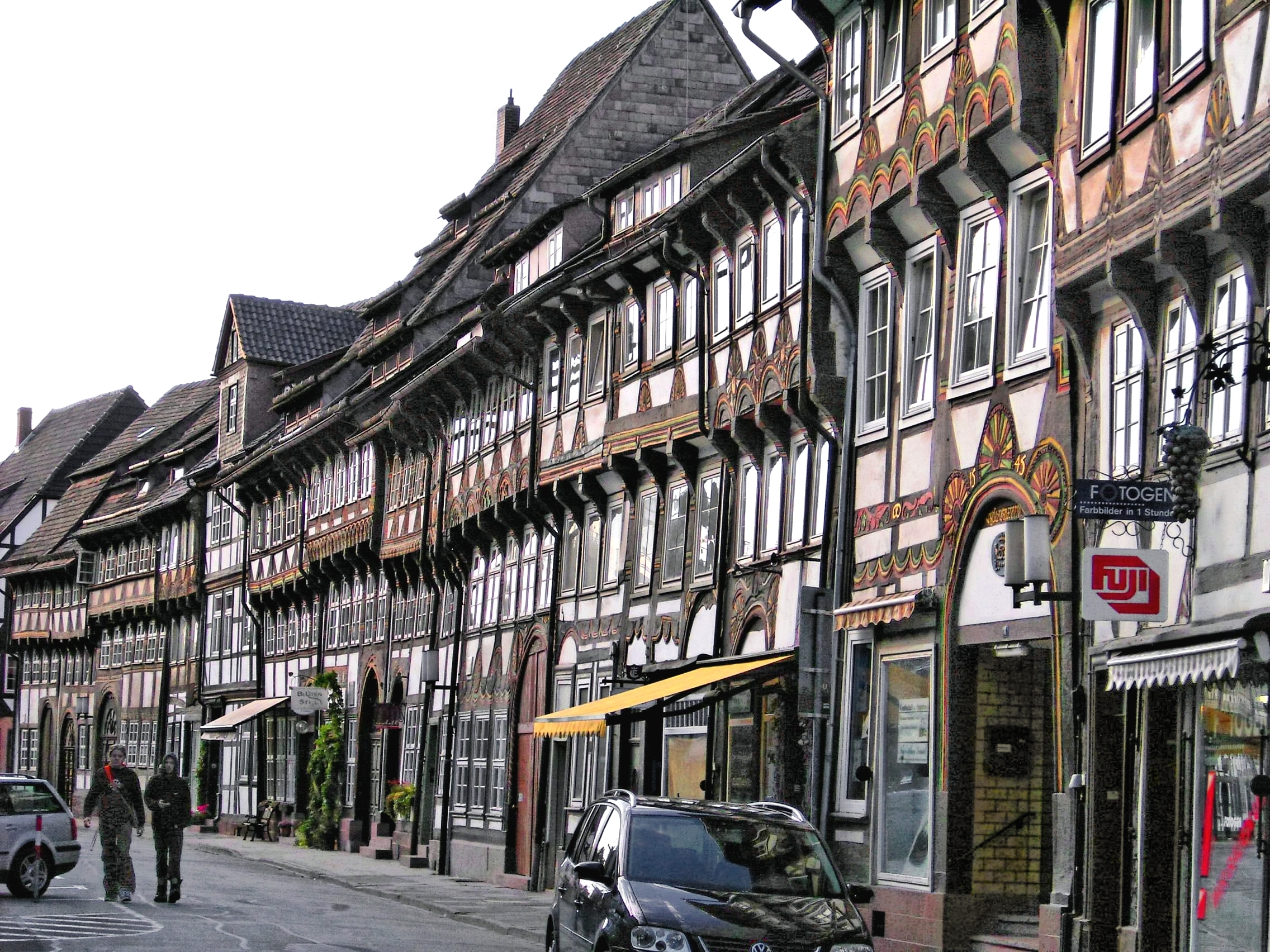
North side of Tiedexer Straße

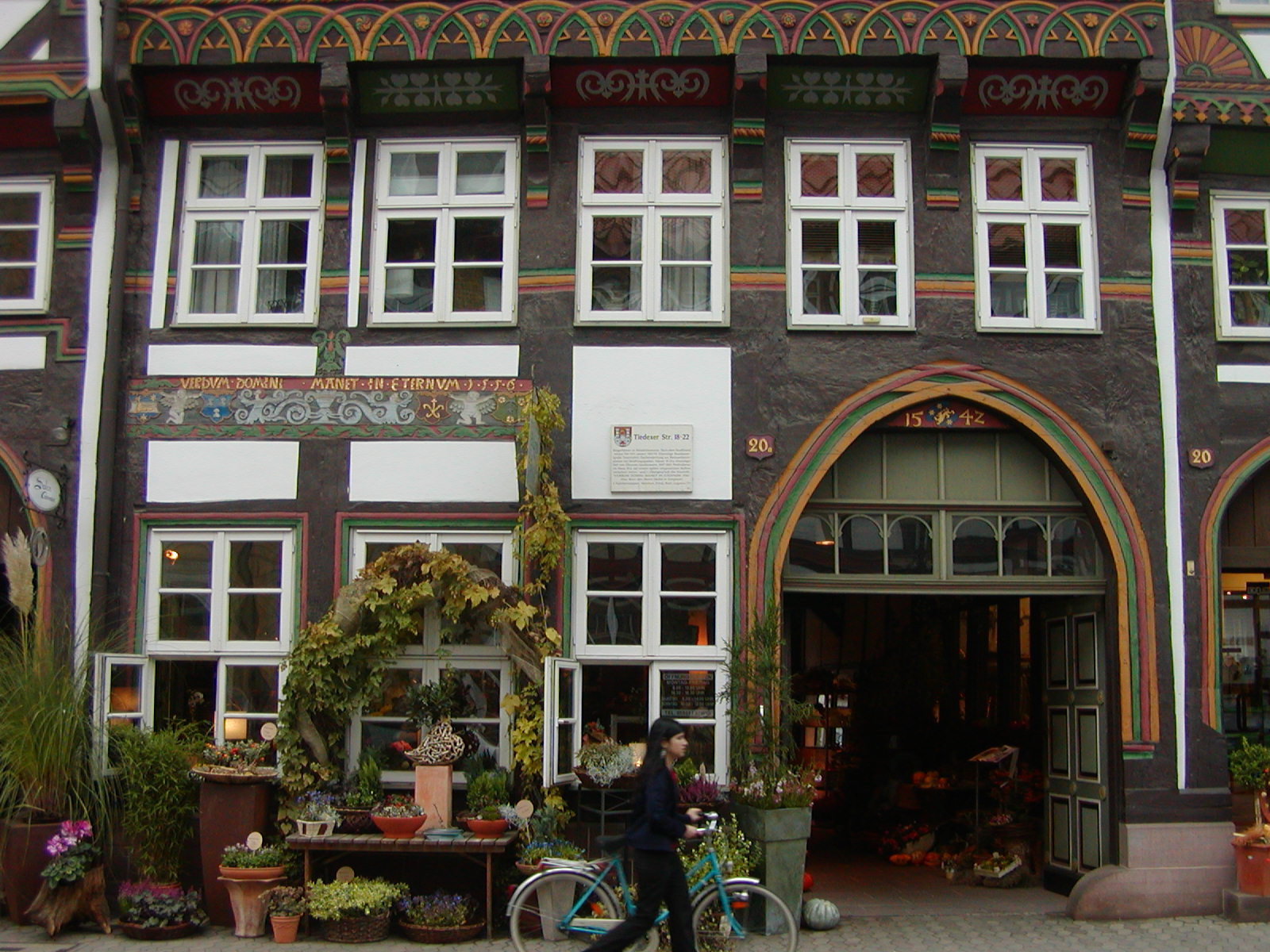
The wood carvings were only coloured at the beginning of the 20th century

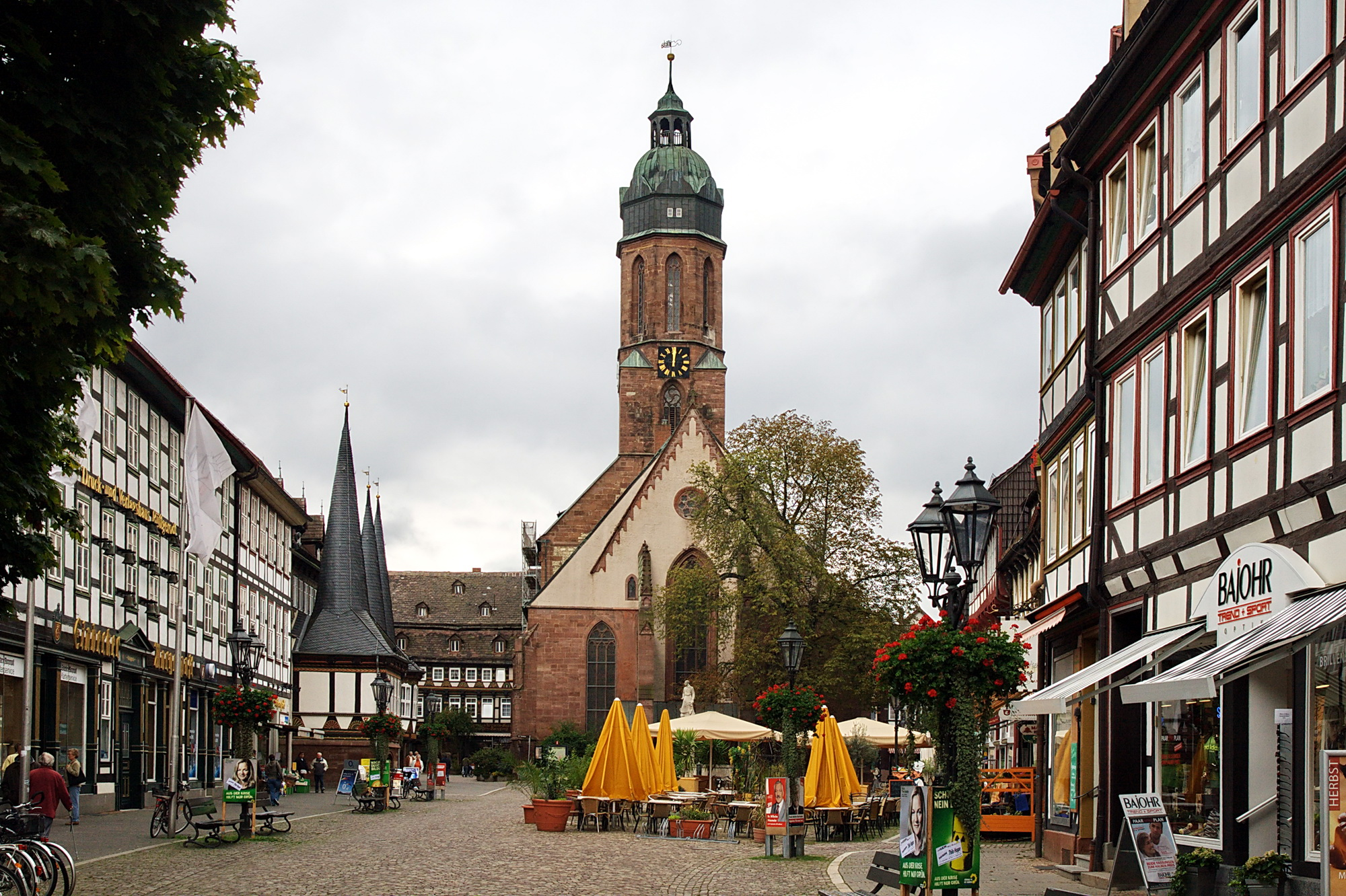
Market square with church St. Jakobi

The historical center of Einbeck provides a nearly complete example of a late medieval town built in the half-timbered construction method. This is why Einbeck was made part of the German Timber-Frame Road.

After the fire of July 1540, that nearly destroyed all residential buildings, the city was very swiftly rebuilt during the next 15 years. The year of construction is very often carved into the frames. This is why a very similar style of buildings is found in the center of the city. The old cellars or basements below the buildings, not affected by the fire, were re-used to build the new houses in the same place. A very pretty example is the northern side of Tiedexer Straße, The wide arched doors, necessary to go in out with a wagon, can be seen here. More than half of these buildings had entitlements to brew.

Einbeck is famous for its piano stage. Every winter it hosts the international piano academy „Feuerwerk“, every spring young pianists from all Germany compete in the Einbecker Klavierfrühling competition. Both events are established and led by the Lithuanian concert pianist and pedagogue Gintaras Januševičius. There are plenty of piano recitals hosted around the year, with both professional and amateur performers on stage. Since 2019 the city brands itself as "Klavierstadt“ (“Piano City“).

=== Houses and halls ===
- Market Square, the very center of the town, with
  - Old Town Hall built in the 16th century, with its three towers, a historic hallmark of Einbeck
  - Brodhaus (breadhouse) built in 1552; the site was used since 1333 as seat of the bakers' guild.
  - The Ratsapotheke (pharmacy), dated 1590.
- Eicke's House has a rich sculptural façade ornamentation of Renaissance style, and is listed as a “Historical landmark of special national and cultural importance”.
- Tiedexer Straße, a line of houses build at approximately the same time and in the same style, middle of the 16th century.
- The New Town Hall was built in 1868 as Prussian Barracks. It is currently (2013) used as administrative building of the city council since 1996. The carillon in the clocktower plays the same chime as Big Ben.
- Concert and culture house TangoBrücke started its concert series in 2008. Every Thursday the audience is treated to a classical recital, a jazz concert, or a tango event.

=== Gallery ===
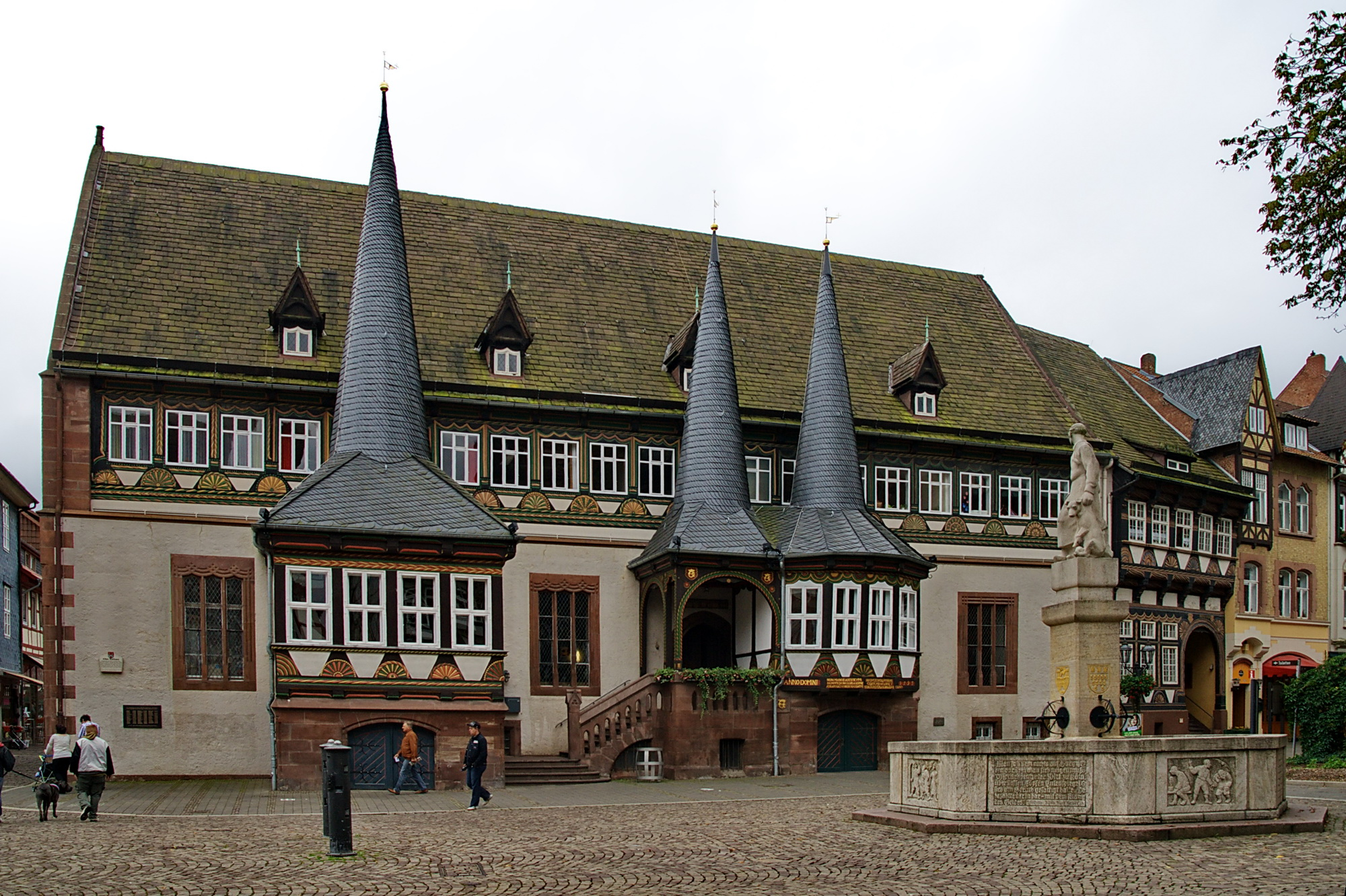
Medieval Town Hall

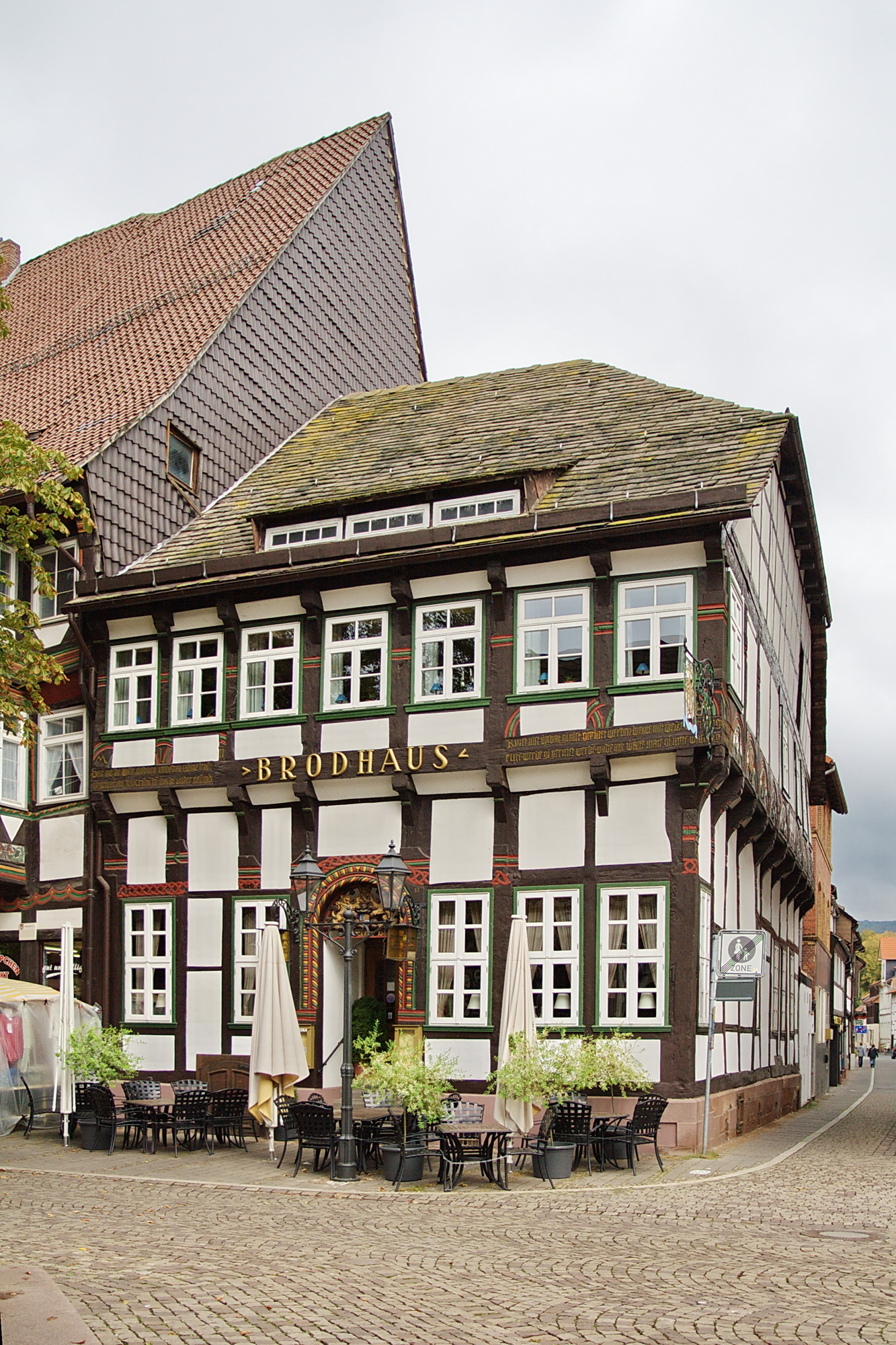
Brodhaus

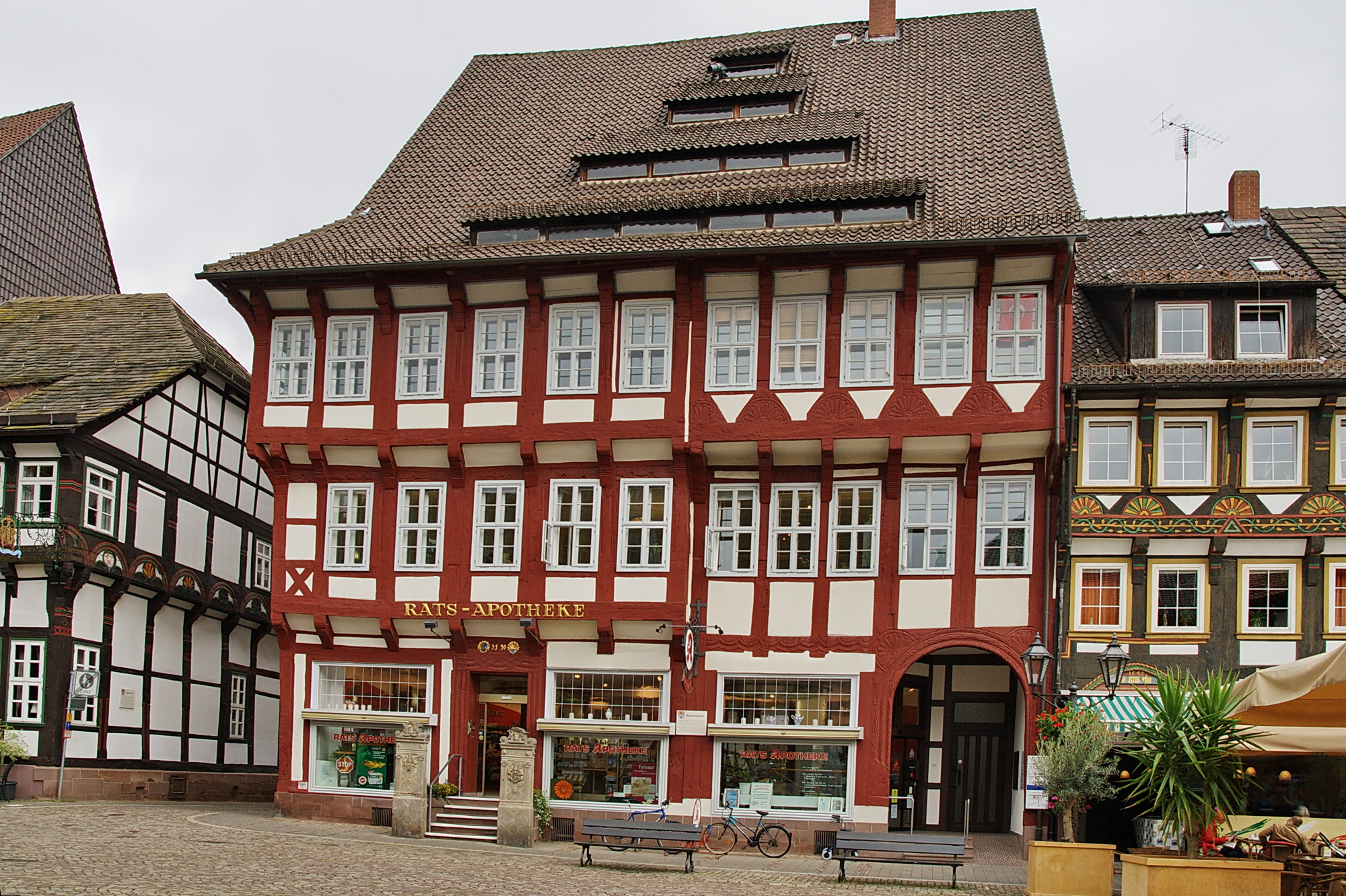
Town Pharmacy

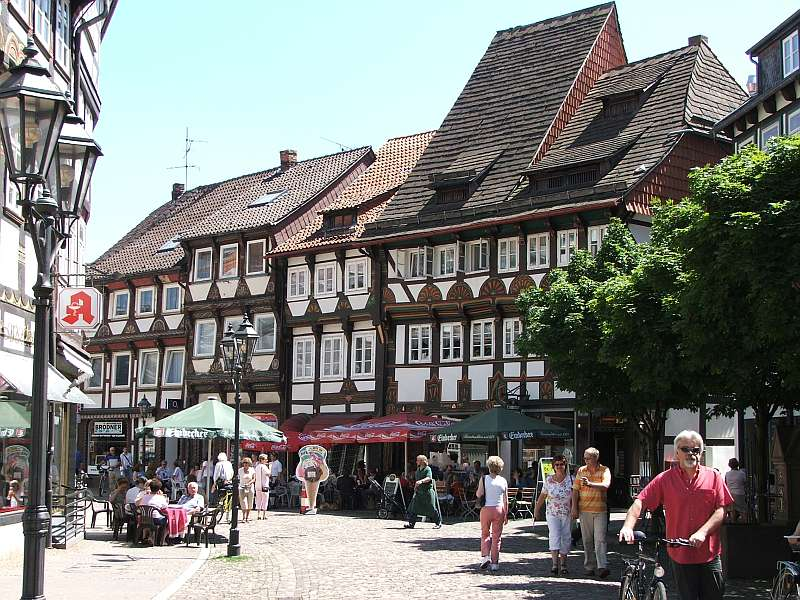
Historic City Center

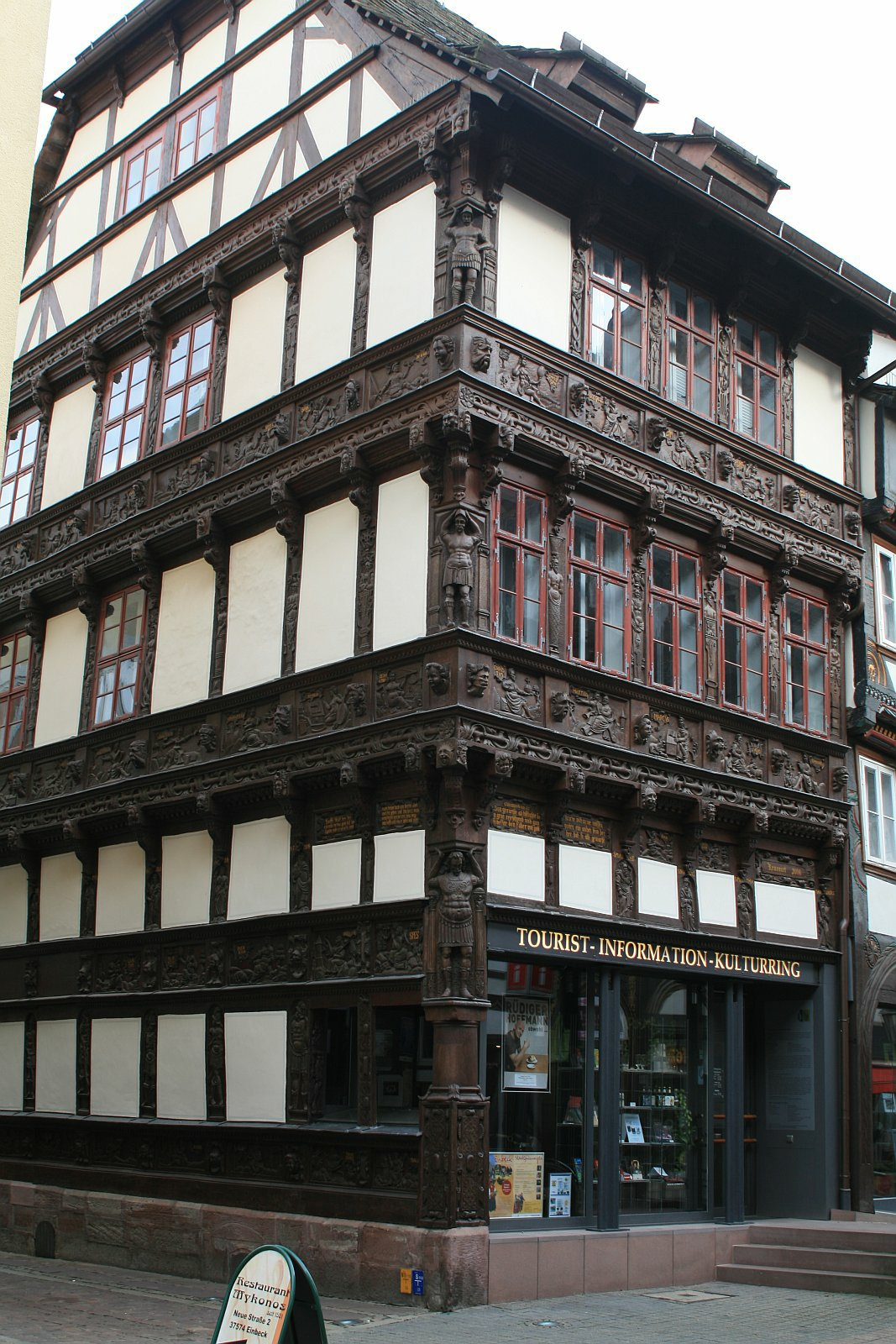
Eicke's House after restoration in 2008

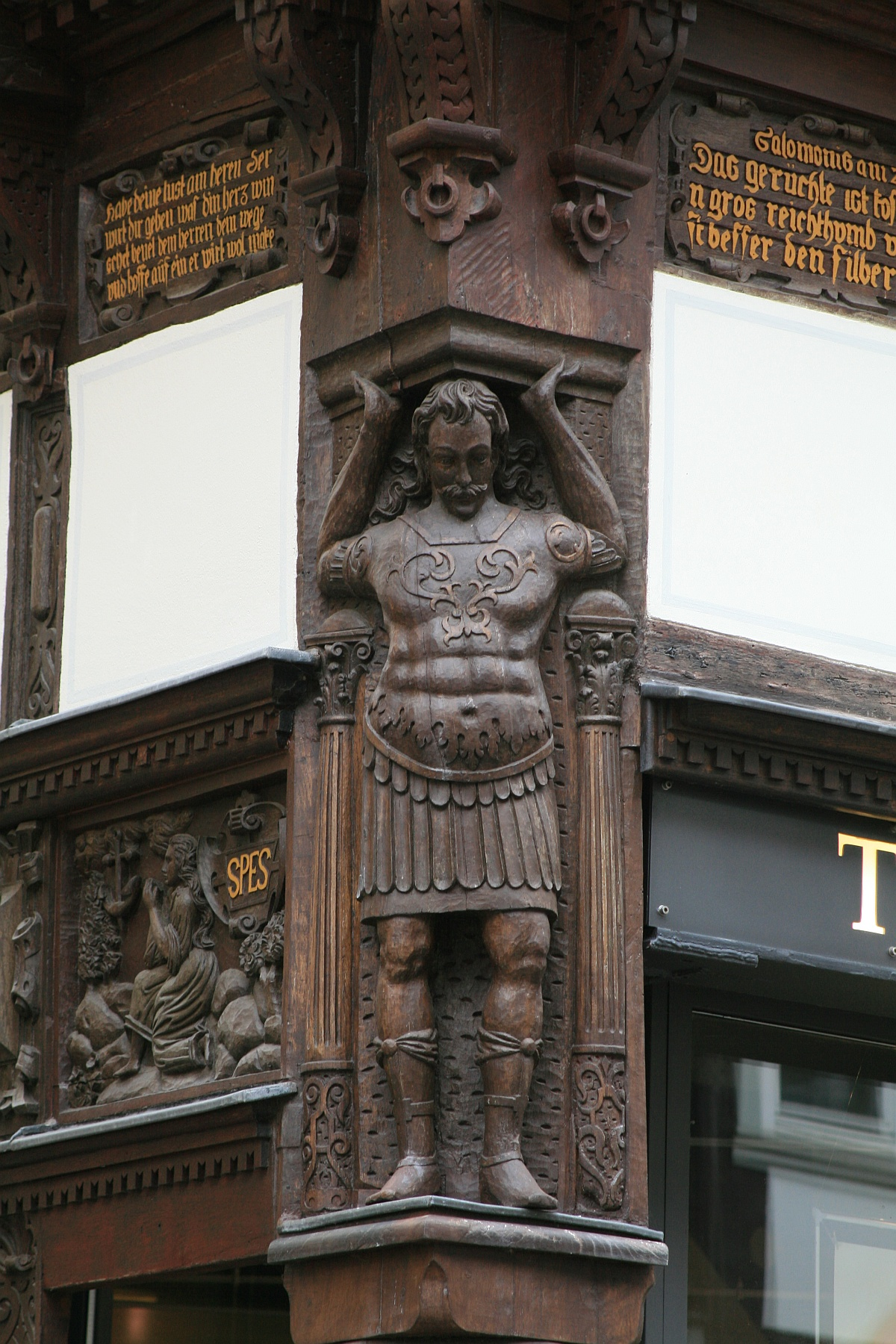
Eicke's House - detail

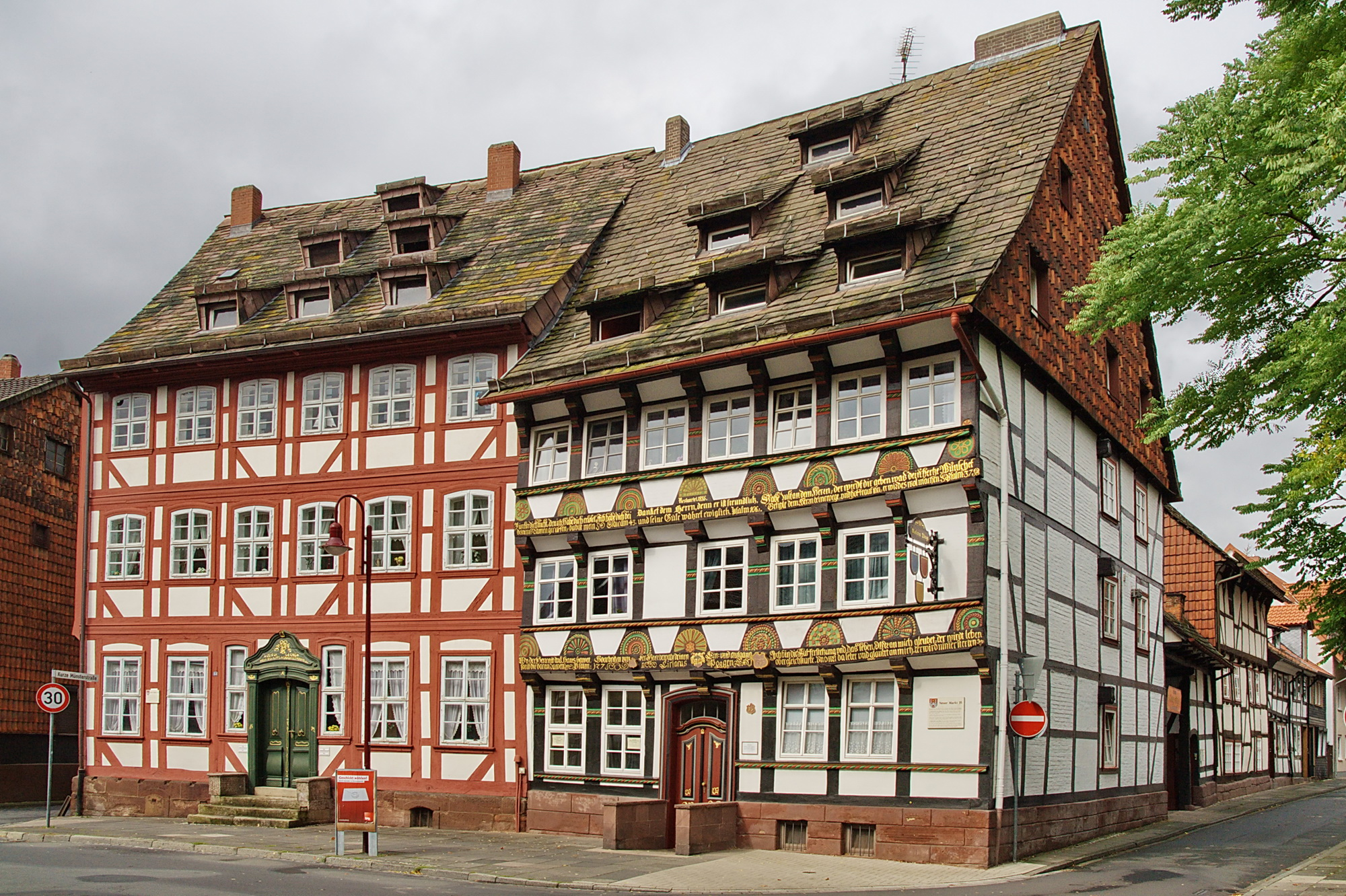
Half timbered houses from the Rococo and Renaissance eras

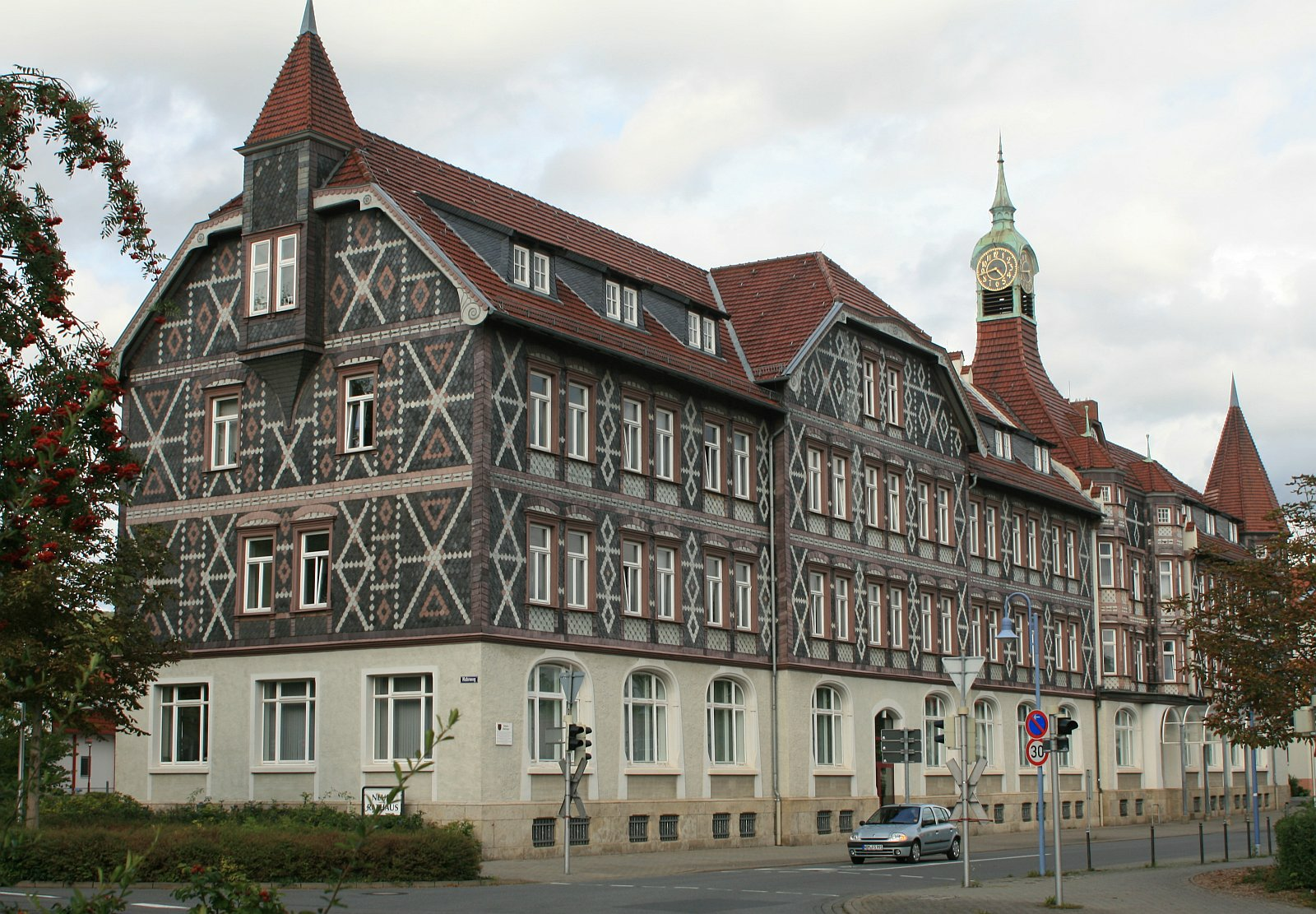
New Town Hall

=== Churches ===
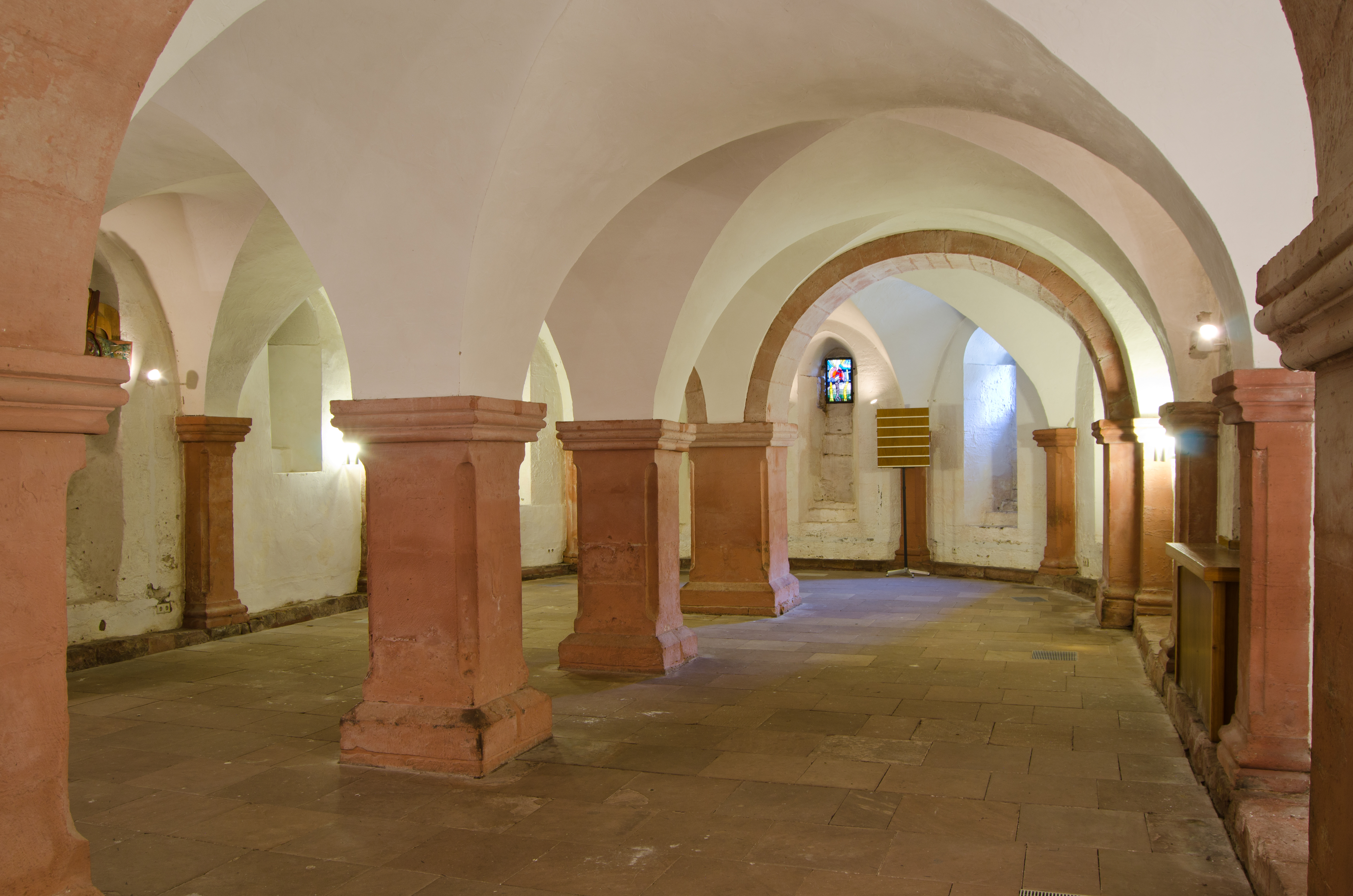
Sankt Alexandri

- Market church Sankt Jacobi (St James's), Lutheran, has a strong presence in the city center through its church tower, 65 meters high. It has a Romanesque baptismal font of sandstone, the oldest artifact in Einbeck
- Minster church Sankt Alexandri (St Alexander's), Lutheran, one of the largest gothic hall churches in the north of Germany
- St. Marien (St Mary's) Lutheran, consecrated 1968 (Old Building New Town Church Sankt Marien rebuild after a fire 1840 − 1846, demolished 1963)
- Jugendkirche Marie (Youth Church Marie),
- Parish Church “St. Josef” (St Joseph's), Roman Catholic
- Chapel „St. Spiritus“, a medieval chapel, is now Greek Orthodox

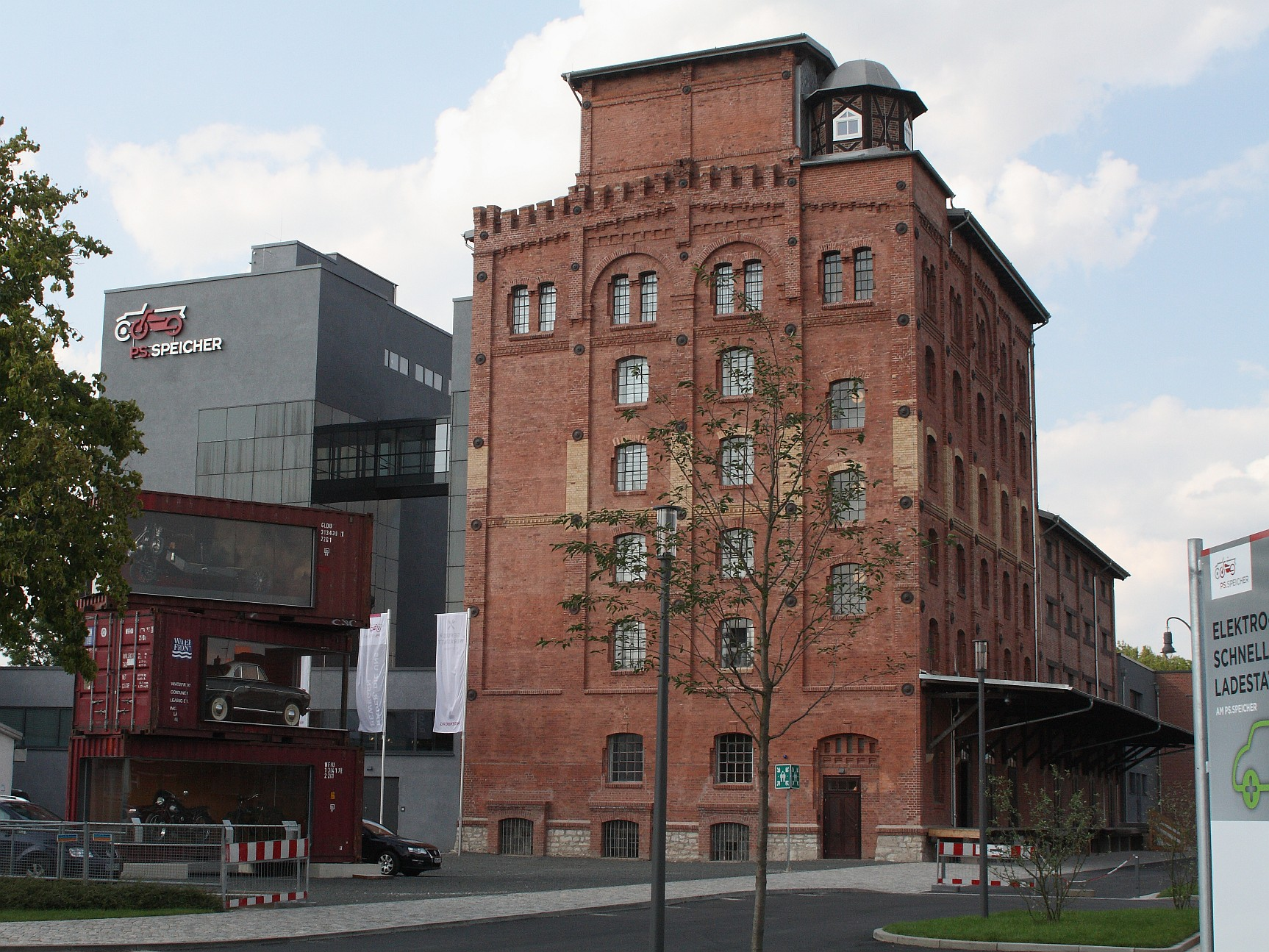
Horsepower Store (PS-Speicher)

=== Theater ===
- Wilhelm-Bendow-Theater (Regular annual programmes through Kulturring Einbeck)

=== Museums, archives and library ===
- Town Museum: Stadtmuseum Einbeck, Steinweg 11/13, with newly designed „RadHaus“ (bicycle museum). The historic archives of the town of Einbeck are stored in the building of the museum
- The Public Library is located adjacent to Stukenbrokpark
- The building of the old synagogue was restored by a local initiative and is a museum.
- Salzderhelden saltworks
- Kunsthaus
- PS Speicher („Horsepower Storage“). A local initiative has started in 2011 to rebuild and restore a former granary to form a museum which does exhibit the largest collection of German motorcycles. The opening ceremony was on July 23, 2014.

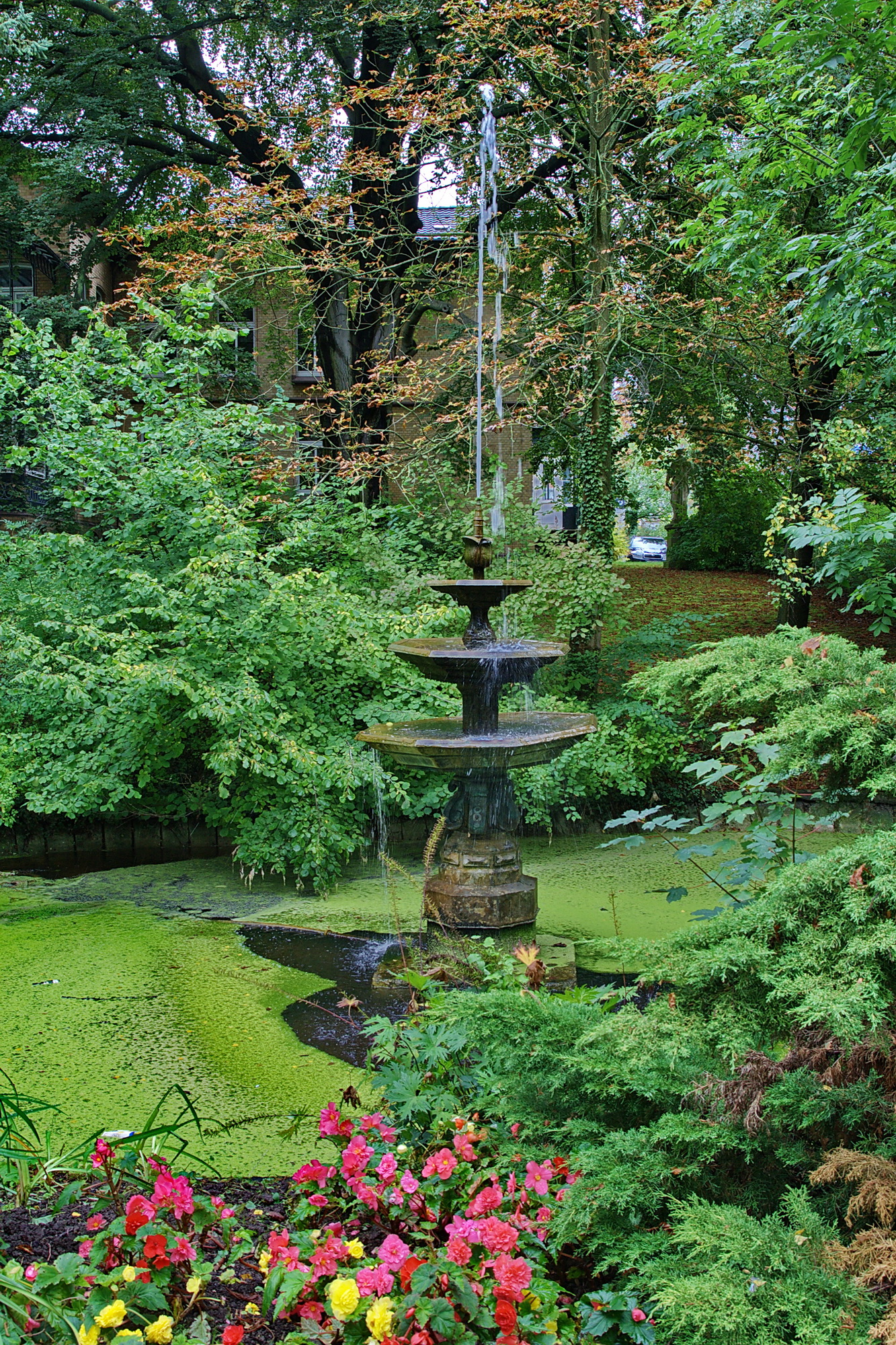
Green Fountain, Stiftsgarten

=== Media ===
The local daily newspaper "Einbecker Morgenpost" is published Monday through Saturday. Einbecker Morgenpost has its own staff and content for local news and takes international and national pages from "Hannoversche Allgemeine Zeitung". There is an advertising paper for the Einbeck region called "Die Eule" distributed Wednesday and Sunday.

=== Schools ===
==== Primary ====
- Geschwister-Scholl-School Einbeck, All-day School
- Pestalozzischule Einbeck
- Primary School Teichenweg (Teichenwegschule), Einbeck
- Primary School Salzderhelden/Vogelbeck
- Leinetalschulen Drüber; Primary and Special School
- Primary School Dassensen/Holtensen
- Primary School Wenzen
- Primary School Kreiensen
- Primary School Greene

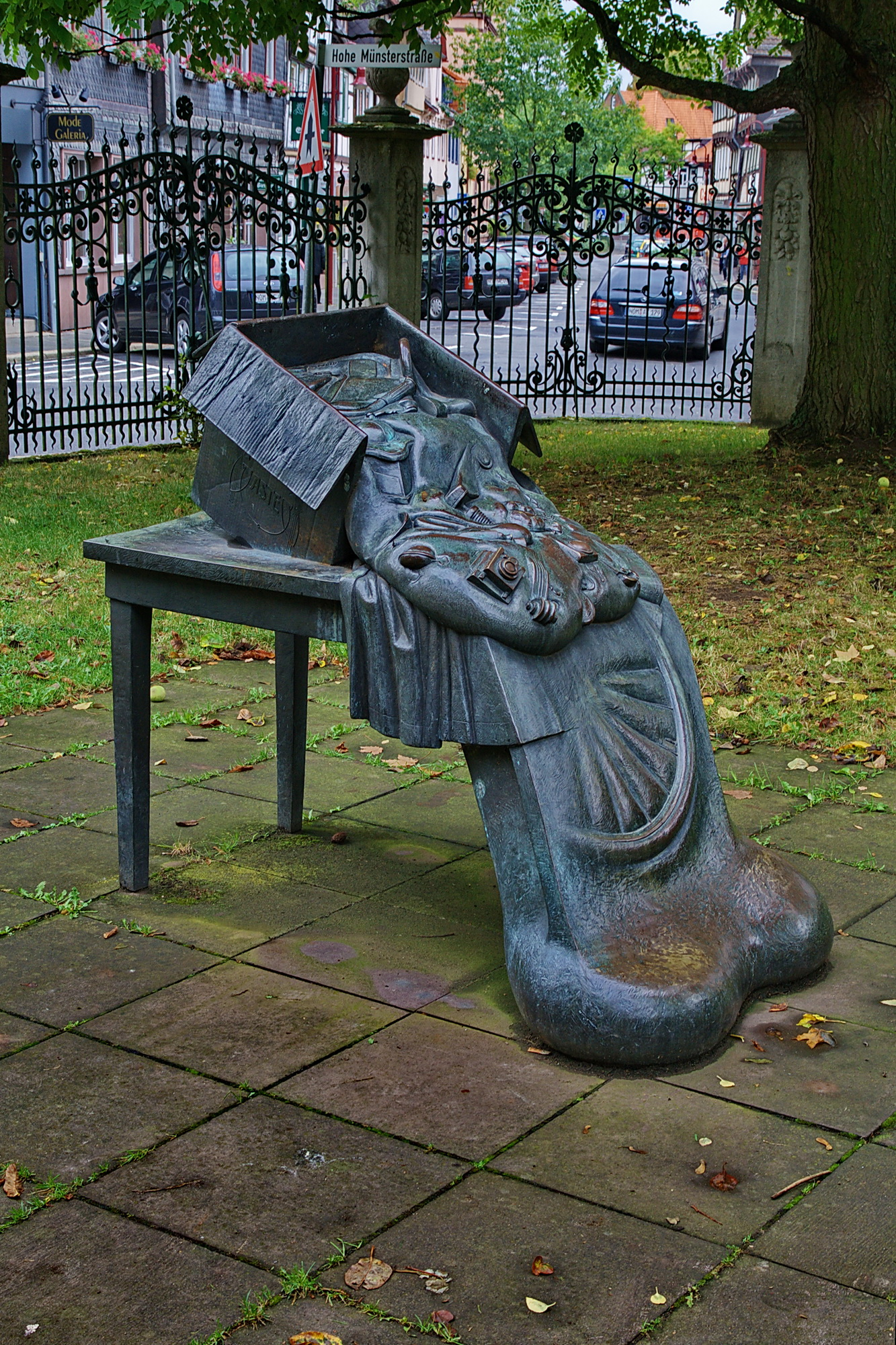
Stiftsgarten

==== Secondary ====
- Geschwister-Scholl-Schule (Secondary Modern)
- Wilhelm-Bendow-Schule (Secondary Modern)
- Löns-Realschule (Secondary)
- Goetheschule Einbeck, Grammar School, All-day School

==== Vocational ====
- Berufsbildende Schulen Einbeck, with Grammar School for Economies, Technology, and Nutrition Science
- Krankenpflegeschule, Nurse's Training School

=== Parks ===
- Stiftsgarten north of the city center, used as garden by stift Sankt Alexandri. Located inside this park is the „Garden of many Generations“. On the eastern side of the Stiftsgarten is the Mendelssohn music school using the Stukenbrokvilla, a residential building in the art nouveau fashion.
- Stukenbrokpark is an area northeast of the city center between city library and central coach terminal.
- The historic city walls are best preserved west of the city center in the areas Bäckerwall, Krähengraben, and Mühlenwall.
- The officers garden is located south of the city center close to the Diek Tower (remains of one of the city gates).

=== Monuments and memorials ===
- The Stukenbrok Memorial was built in memory of the founder of the mail order business August Stukenbrok. It is located in the east of the Stiftsgartens, which was an area once owned by Stukenbrok, next to the little pond.
- Memorial for Till Eulenspiegel, who is said to have lived in Einbeck for a while, on Market Square. As Eulenspiegel is a fictional person that is a surprising fact.
- War Memorial for the Franco-Prussian War 1870/1871 designed by Conrad Wilhelm Hase
- In 1998 locals erected a big concrete block called Stein des Anstoßes (Stumbling Stone) close to the Market Church on Market Square to remind everybody that the number of unemployed in Einbeck (2341 people) was far too high. The stone was to remain in place until the number of unemployed would be half its 1998 number. The stone could have been removed in October 2007.

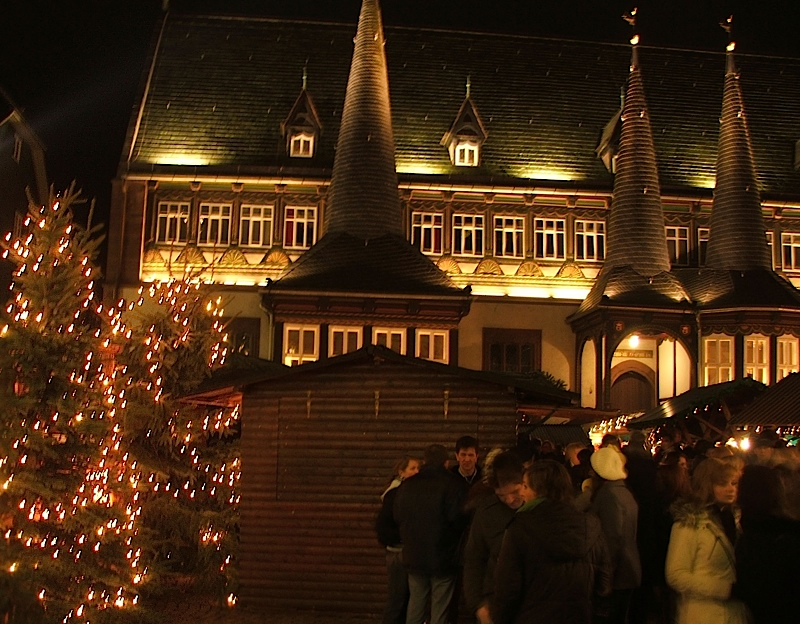
Christmas Market on Market Square

- The Gasometer is a technical memorial in the city area.

=== Recurring events ===
- May 1: Einbecker Bluesfestival & Bock-Beer-Tapping
- May: Open Cross Country Race “Einbecker Bierstadtlauf”
- June: Foodfestival
- September: Vat-Pushing-Contest “Fassrollen”
- September: Pub-Music-Night
- October: City Festival „Eulenfest”
- November/December: Christmas Market on Market Square
- December: New Year's Eve Cross Country Race „Auf der Hube”

== Notable people ==
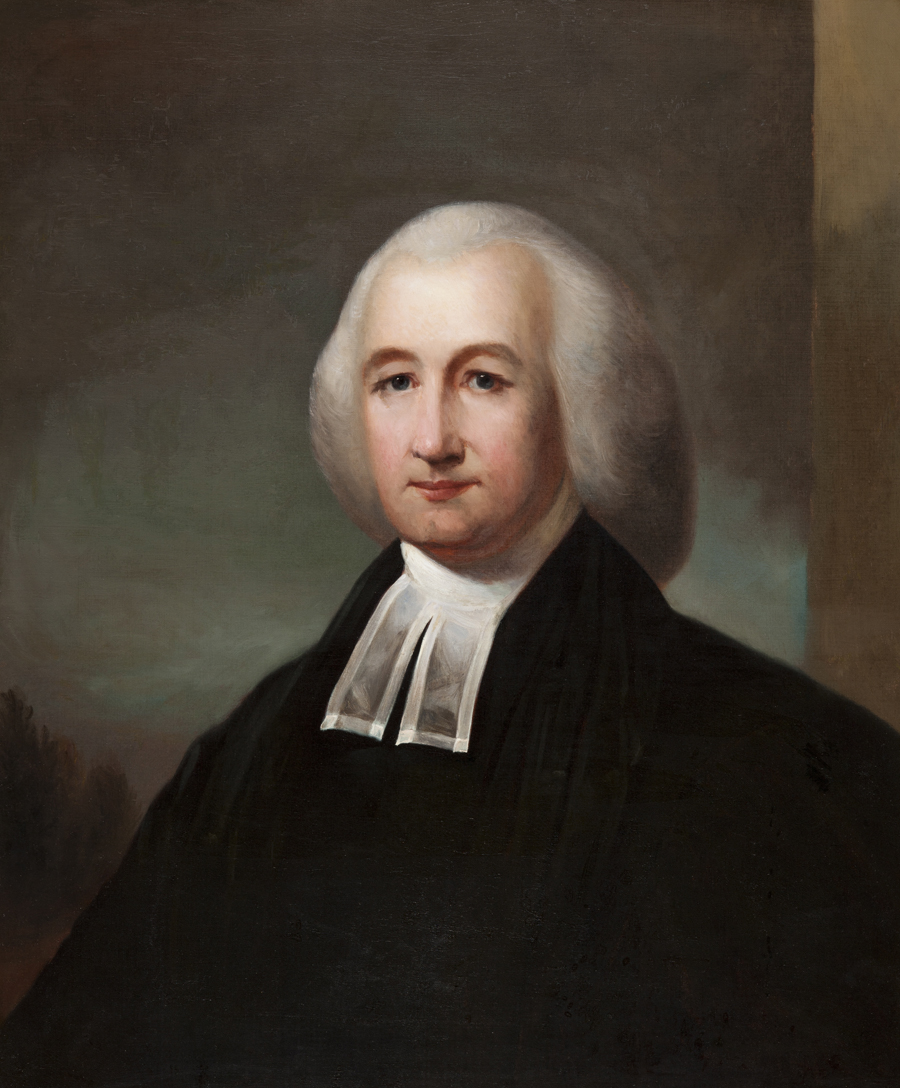
Henry Muhlenberg, ca 1780

- Justus Georg Schottelius (1612–1676), grammarian, published on German grammar, language theory and poetics.
- Henry Muhlenberg (1711–1787), emigrated to Pennsylvania in 1742 and founded the Lutheran church in the American colonies.
- Friedrich Sertürner (1783–1841), pharmacist, discovered morphine, 1804, opened his first pharmacy here, 1806
- Georg Schambach (1811–1879), Germanist, local high school director and folklorist
- Conrad Wilhelm Hase (1818–1902), architect and conservationist, was honorary citizen
- Harry Rosenbusch (1836–1914), a petrographer
- Georg Knorr (1859–1911), engineer and railroad entrepreneur
- Friedrich Uhde (1880–1966), engineer and entrepreneur
- Wilhelm Bendow (1884–1950), actor
- Walter Bock (1895–1948), chemist, developed styrene-butadiene
- Emil Reinecke (1933–2011), racing cyclist
- Ilse Everlien Berardo (born 1955), emigrated to the Autonomous Region of Madeira and became the Lutheran theologian and pastor of the local German-speaking Protestant Church. Member of the Order of Merit of the Federal Republic of Germany.

== GAPP ==
For many years, the city's high school has had an exchange programme, known as GAPP or German-American Partnership Program, with Roy High School and Ogden High School (Utah) in Utah. Every other year Einbeck students fly to Roy in October to spend two weeks with host families and attend Roy and Ogden High Schools. After their two-week stay the German students travel to places in the US such as Moab, Las Vegas and California. The Roy and Ogden High students visit Einbeck every other year during their summer break.

Since 2002, Einbeck has been a twin town with Keene, New Hampshire, USA. A delegation of high school football (soccer) players, coaches and city officials visited Keene on July 1, 2010 and spent a week touring the city, playing exhibition games and watching the World Cup with the locals.

== Twin towns ==
Einbeck is twinned with:

- Thiais, France (1962)
- Artern, Germany (1990)
- Patschkau, Paczków, Poland (1992)
- Keene, United States (2002)
- Wieselburg, Austria (1987)

== Transport ==
=== Road ===
There is direct access to Federal Highway “B 3” Bundesstraße 3 running in a north–south direction, connecting Hannover to Kassel, each about 70 kilometres (43 miles) away. Until the 1994 “B 3” ran through the city centre, but there is now a bypass open.

Access to National Motorway “A 7” Bundesautobahn 7 is about 10 kilometres (6.2 miles) away. “A 7” connects Flensburg, on the German/Danish border, with Reutte in Austria and roughly runs in a north–south direction as well.

=== Rail ===
The Einbeck-Salzderhelden station is located on the Hanoverian Southern Railway part of the main North–South railway between Hanover and Kassel. Services run at approximately hourly intervals.

The larger railway station in Einbeck is Kreiensen, which provides in addition to the services mentioned above, train connections to the West (Holzminden, Altenbeken) and North East (Seesen, Goslar, Brunswick).

In 2018 the railway station Einbeck Mitte in the city centre of Einbeck reopened after 34 years. Today there is an hourly train service between Einbeck Mitte and Salzderhelden and six additional through services between Einbeck Mitte and Göttingen in both directions.

The closest high speed train station is Göttingen, about 38 kilometres (24 miles) away. Göttingen can be reached from Salzderhelden in hourly intervals.

Einbeck has a small railway company, Ilmebahn, which runs rail freight services.

=== Bus ===
Einbeck is part of a transport association in the South of Lower Saxony, VSN, which connects virtually all smaller villages with the cities in South Lower Saxony. Ilmebahn, the local transport company runs local bus services, as does RBB (Regionalbus Braunschweig).

=== Air ===
The next international airport is Hannover Airport, with connections to major European cities. This airport can be reached by train. A smaller airport mainly for holiday travelers Kassel-Calden is about 90 kilometres (56 miles) away.
