= Sülbeck =

- Ortsteil of Einbeck
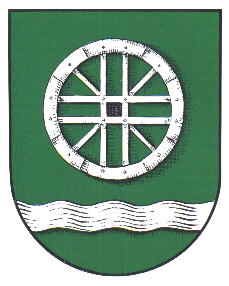
- Coat of arms
- Interactive map of Sülbeck
- Location within Germany Location within Lower Saxony
- Coordinates: 51°46′30″N 09°55′10″E
- Country: Germany
- State: Lower Saxony
- District: Northeim
- Town: Einbeck
- Elevation: 111 m (364 ft)

Population (2021)
  - Total: 419
- Time zone: UTC+01:00 (CET)
  - Summer (DST): UTC+02:00 (CEST)
- Postal codes: 37574
- Dialling codes: 05561
- Vehicle registration: NOM, EIN

Sülbeck is one of the oldest villages in the town of Einbeck, district Northeim, Germany. The development of the village is connected to the saline springs. These were used to produce brine and salt for some hundred years.

== Geography ==
Sülbeck lies in southern Lower Saxony between the Harz and Solling Mountains. It is located 1 km west of the river Leine, at the western edge of the Leine Graben. The village is immediately west of the nature reserve that is located in the flood retention basin Salzderhelden.

== History ==
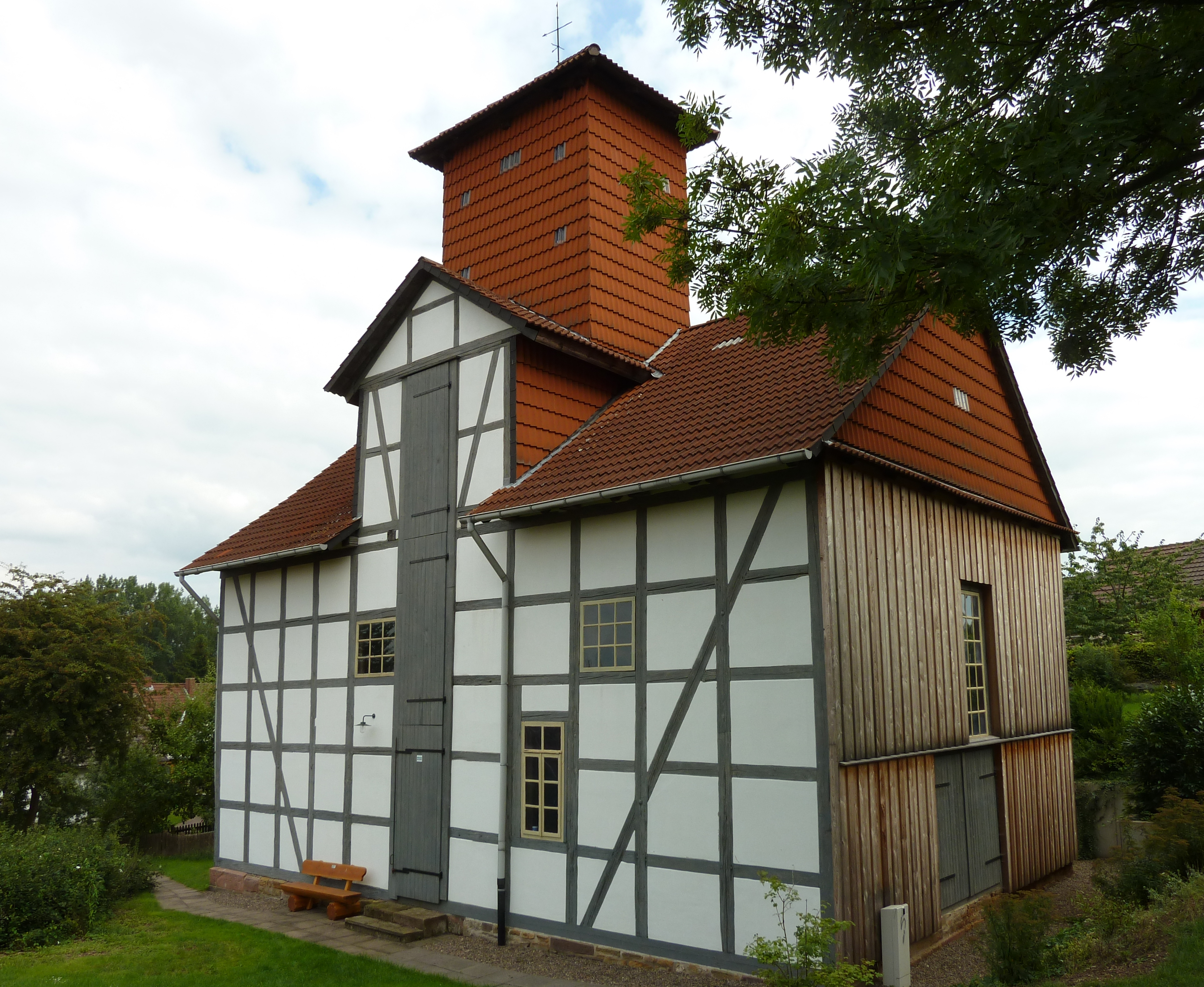
Upper Drilling Derrick, built 1865

Prehistoric settlements in the vicinity of the salt springs is proven: "From the Sülbecker mountain originate some tools that have been manufactured from Neanderthals resting there". During the development of a new housing area "Am Bohrturm" (At the Derrick) in the 1980s further archaeological investigations were carried out which showed that the settlements date back to about 5000 BC. The first written source is to be found in a deed of the monastery Amelungsborn from the year 1210. The deed talks about the "Salinis" at Siburgehusen. On 26 April 1686 the elector Ernst August of Hanover Calenberg ordere, that in Sülbeck, salt works, including a graduation tower were to be built. The history of the salt works is the main difference between Sülbeck and its neighbor farming villages.

== History of the salt works ==
The Duchy of Brunswick-Lüneburg was seeking possibilities for more income. Therefore a proposal was made by the administrative head of the county of Salzderhelden, to which Sülbeck belonged, to build salt works in Sülbeck. The project was driven by Otto Friedrich von Moltke, the last resident of the castle Heldenburg, now ruined. Due to the high salinity of the brine, at 9,4%, it was planned to boil the brine directly.

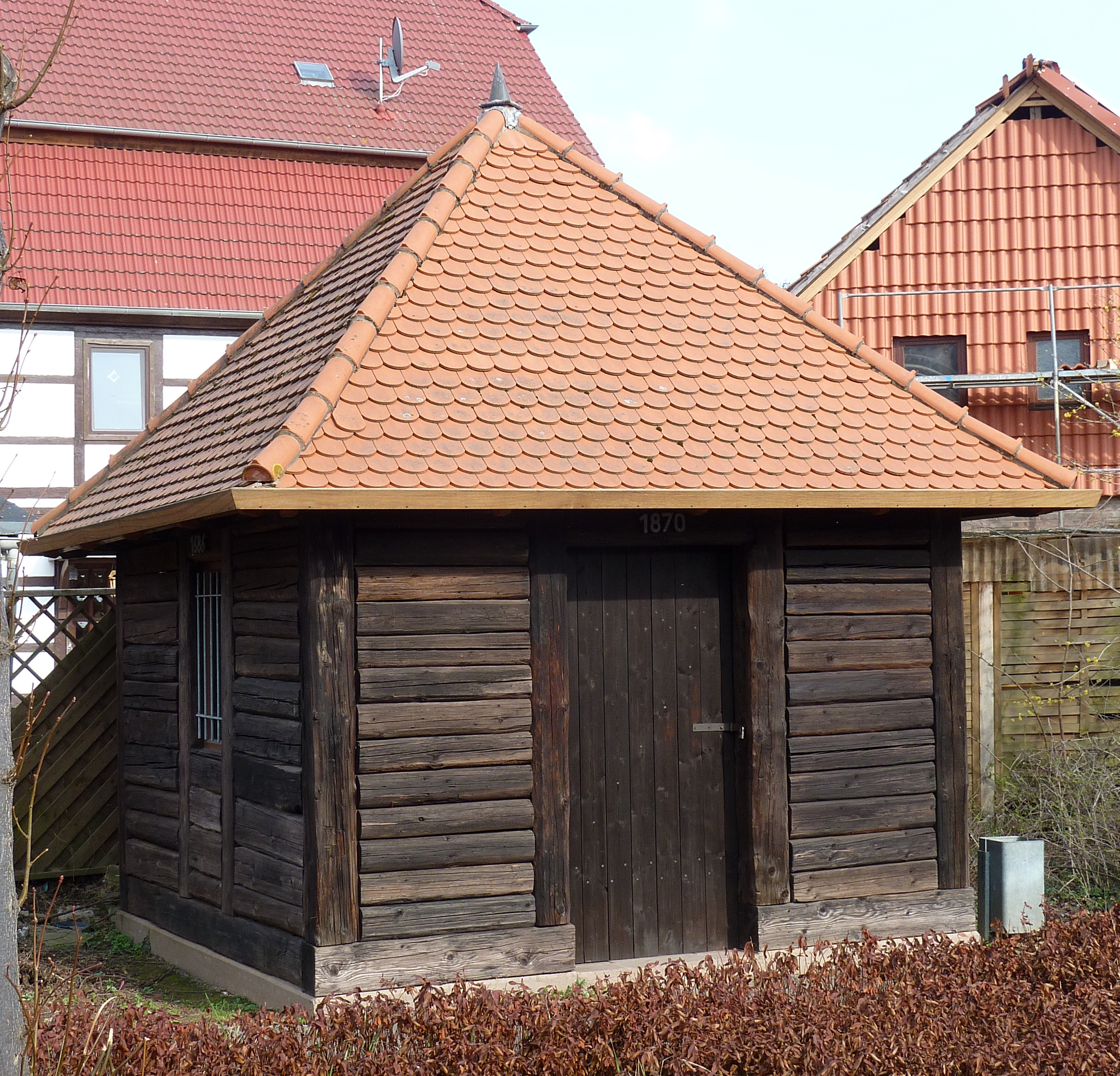
Solhaus

However, exact calculations showed that the costs for the wood used as fuel would have been prohibitively high. Therefore, the project was greatly expanded to include a graduation tower to increase the salinity of the brine to about 20%. This first graduation tower was about 166 m long and stretched south from the current Sülbeck village square, Dorfplatz.

In 1686 the first main brine well was ready, as were two smaller wells. To pump the brine out of the soil and supply the graduation, tower pumps were needed. The only apparent source of power at the time was water, which was in short supply on site. Thus a canal had to be dug to provide water supply from the river Leine, some kilometers upstream from Sülbeck. Water was tapped off the Leine at Hollenstedt, about 6,5 km upwards and following the rim of the Leine valley around the villages Stöckheim and Drüber. At the edge of the current village square the canal made a 90° bend from south to east and the water flowed back into the river Leine about 1 km downstream. About 100 soldiers dug the canal, called "Salzgraben" (salt canal) by the locals at a total construction time of two years. A large undershot waterwheel, installed on the current village square, drove the pumps. A stylized water wheel is now an integral part of the local coat of arms. Also at the present village square in Sülbeck a brine supply tower was built, from which the brine flew onto the graduation towers. In 1689 the industrial plant started operation. Soon more buildings were added, such as a second graduation tower.

== Remaining buildings ==
The Upper Drilling Derrick is located in a half timbered building. It was restored by a local initiative from 2006 to 2009, and has since been a museum. The Lower Drilling Derrick, directly adjacent to the Brine Reservoir, is still operating and is pumping brine. A small timbered structure was erected over the first brinewell in 1668, which survived until the 1960s, and was taken away then to make room for a wider road intersection at Solstraße and Severshuser Weg. It was called "Solhaus" and was reconstructed a few meters from the original site in 1992.

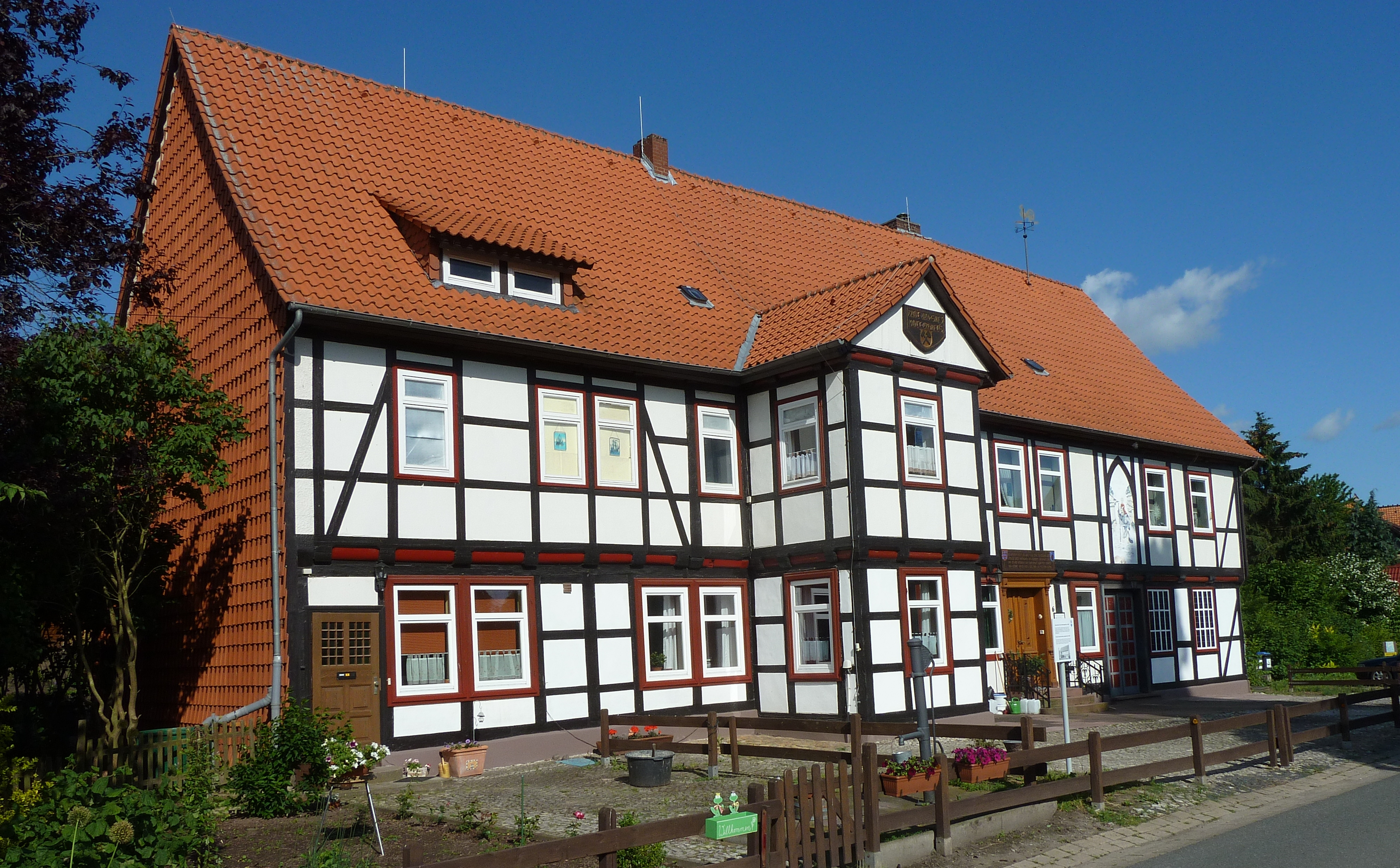
Administration building, "Faktoreihaus", from 1694

The old administrative building, Faktoreihaus, of the then state-owned salt works was constructed in 1694. It is located on Solstraße and survives in only slightly altered form. On the right hand side of the building is the chapel used for church services until at least 2014. The protruding part of the office building was made so that the officers had a good view of the works area. The building got its present form after a rebuild in 1910. There are a few other buildings around Salinenplatz which have been erected in conjunction with the salt works.

== Infrastructure connected with the salt works ==
=== Harbour ===
The transport of the fuel necessary to boil the brine, at first wood, was performed via horse cart. The supply of fuel was the biggest cost element in the operation. Wood was transported from as far as the Harz Mountains. Later the salt works were privatized and used coal as fuel. By then it had access to the newly built railway line which connects Hannover with Kassel, about 3 km away. Consequently, in 1883 the canal was widened east of the present village square in Sülbeck to build a little harbor. The area has been built over since 2010. At first the barges were hauled up the canal by horses. In 1886 a small tug was obtained that towed the barges loaded with coal from Salzderhelden to Sülbeck. Two locks were built on the Salzgraben to bridge the height difference between Leine and Salzgraben close to the outflow back into the Leine river. Later, the first tug, Theodor, was exchanged for the stronger Grubenhagen. After an aerial cableway was built, the traffic with barges was given up. The rudder of one of the barges is preserved in the museum. The Salzgraben was filled in during the 1970s during the construction of the flood retention basin Salzderhelden.

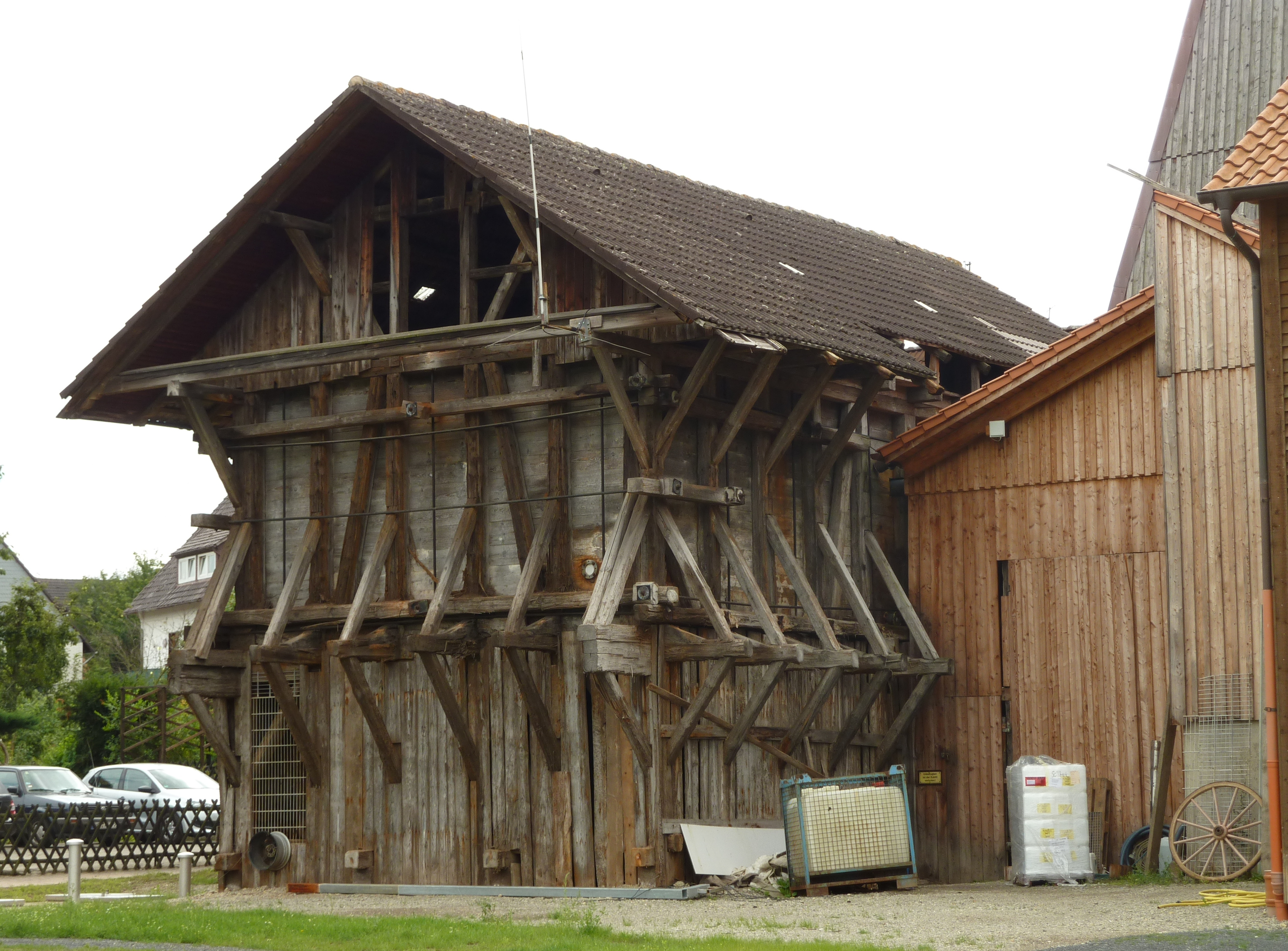
Brine Reservoir, built in 1882

=== Aerial cableway ===
During 1908 construction began for an aerial cableway to transport coal from the railway station of Salzderhelden to Sülbeck. The cableway's starting point was close to the railway station in Salzderhelden. From there it ran through the meadows between Salzderhelden and Sülbeck and reached its end point at the current village square in Sülbeck after crossing the Salzgraben very close to its end point. This cableway remained in service until the salt works closed operation in 1950 after a bankruptcy. After that, many of the buildings were dismantled. The concrete foundations of the cableway could be seen in the meadows as of 2013.

=== Electricity and telephone ===
In 1899 a small hydroelectric power station with two turbines was installed in Sülbeck which used the water of the Salzgraben. In the villages Sülbeck and neighbouring Drüber, electricity was supplied from December 22, 1899, onwards. Shortly after Vogelbeck on the other side of the river Leine was connected, on July 1, 1903, Stöckheim followed. The city of Northeim received electric power only in 1912. In 1894 a telephone line was installed between Hollenstedt and Sülbeck, the first in the area. It was used for communication about the regulation of water supply through the Salzgraben between the two villages.

=== Narrow gauge field railway ===
In some of the pictures, tracks of a narrow gauge field railway can be seen with a railroad switch on one end. When it was built and later removed is unknown.

== Recent history ==
On 1 March 1974 the village was incorporated into the city of Einbeck.

== Politics ==
=== Village Council Drüber/Sülbeck ===
The mayor of the village is Andreas Mann. The current legislative period started in 2021.

There is a joint village council with Drüber. The election 2021 brought the following results for the village council:

- Wählergemeinschaft Drüber-Sülbeck 9 seats

=== Coat of arms ===
The coat of arms of Sülbeck shows the water wheel of the former salt works and the Salzgraben that supplied the water to it.

== Culture and points of interest ==
=== Buildings ===
The two drilling derricks of the historical salt works, built in 1865 and 1882, and the brine reservoir, built in 1882 are technical monuments since 1984.

=== Culture ===
Since 1989 a local initiative from the south of Lower Saxony has organized a series of concerts known by name of "Kultur im Esel". Esel (donkey) is the name of a former local pub. It is one of the longest running series of concerts in Lower Saxony. The organizers try to give a stage to relatively unknown artists of different music styles. There are 10–15 concerts per year. In 2013, artists including Chris Kavanagh, Sally Barker, and Vicki Genfan performed. The non-profit trust "Kultur im Esel" operates an event hall with more performances. There is regularly a "Low German Afternoon", where only the local vernacular, Low German, is spoken.

Sülbeck has many clubs including a sports club, a brass band, a carnival club, and a choir. Heimatverein cares for the Upper Drilling Derrick and was instrumental in preserving it.

== Economy ==
Brine is still produced from a well in Sülbeck.

== Literature ==
- Gernot Schmidt: Das löbliche Saltzwerck zu Sülbeck. Geschichte und Entwicklung einer niedersächsischen Saline. Verlag des Deutschen Bergbau-Museums. Bochum 1995. ISBN 3-921533-55-4 (The book provides a detailed overview about the development of the salt works of Sülbeck. It includes a lot of historical photos.)
- Einbecker Geschichtsverein e. V. (ed.): Einbecks Dörfer - Bilder aus vergangenen Zeiten. Duderstadt 1995. ISBN 3-923453-64-7
