= Bodenwerder (Samtgemeinde) =

Coordinates: 51.976°N 9.514°E

Bodenwerder was a Samtgemeinde ("collective municipality") in the district of Holzminden, in Lower Saxony, Germany. Its seat was in the town Bodenwerder. On 1 January 2010, it merged with the former Samtgemeinde Polle to form the new Samtgemeinde Bodenwerder-Polle.

== Municipalities ==
The Samtgemeinde Bodenwerder consisted of the following municipalities:

- Bodenwerder
- Halle
- Hehlen
- Heyen
- Kirchbrak
- Pegestorf
