= Polle (Samtgemeinde) =

Former collective municipality in the district of Holzminde, Germany

Coordinates: 51.900°N 9.400°E

Polle was a Samtgemeinde ("collective municipality") in the district of Holzminden, in Lower Saxony, Germany. Its seat was in the village Polle. On 1 January 2010, it merged with the former Samtgemeinde Bodenwerder to form the new Samtgemeinde Bodenwerder-Polle.

== Municipalities ==
The Samtgemeinde Polle consisted of the following municipalities:

1. Brevörde
2. Heinsen
3. Ottenstein
4. Polle
5. Vahlbruch
