= Burgberg (ridge) =

Hill range in Germany

Coordinates: 51°52′40″N 9°31′10″E

The Burgberg (German pronunciation: [ˈbʊʁkˌbɛʁk]; also called the Burgberge) is a ridge of hills up to 345.2 m above sea level (NN) high in the German federal state of Lower Saxony.

== Geography ==
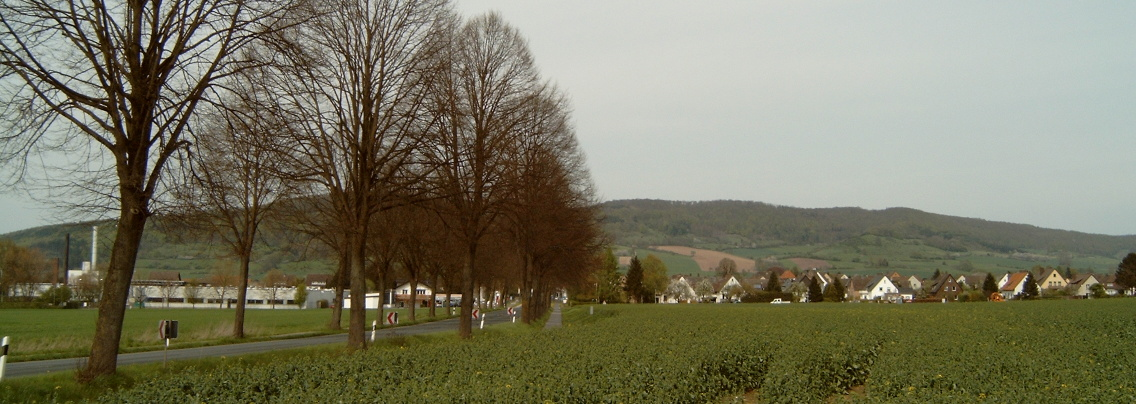
The Burgberg. In the foreground the Flecken Bevern

The Burgberg, which belongs to the Solling-Vogler Nature Park, is located in the district of Holzminden in the Weser Uplands between the hill ranges of the Vogler to the north, the Homburgwald to the northeast, and the Solling to the south. It lies between the towns of Bevern in the southwest and Golmbach and Stadtoldendorf in the east. To the west flows the River Weser.

A section of the B 64 federal road runs along the southern part of the Burgberg, linking Holzminden with Negenborn.

== Sights ==
The ruined walls of the former castle of Everstein may be seen on the twin peaks of the Großer (Higher) Everstein (345.2 m above NN) and Kleiner (Lower) Everstein.

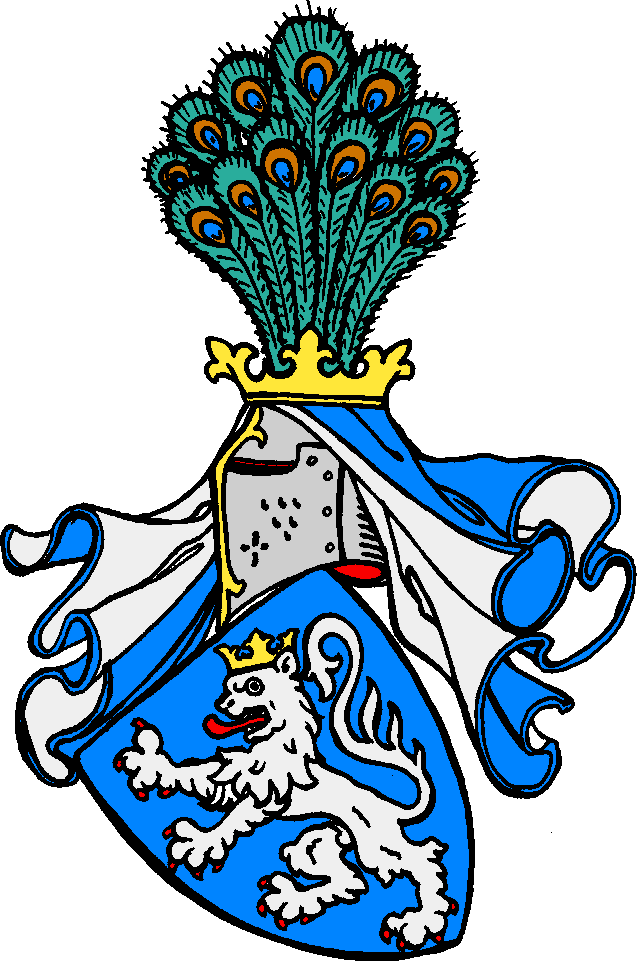
Coat-of-arms of the Counts of Everstein

Since 1116, the noble lords and Counts of Everstein (also Eberstein) have been named after their castles on the Großer and Kleiner Everstein on the Burgberg. As followers and relatives of the Imperial House of Hohenstaufen, the family expanded their own property in the Weser Uplands into a small state dominion. They also founded the Dobnagau in today's Vogtland around 1100. The von Everstein family split into several lines around 1200. The Ohsen and Holzminden lines died out in the 14th century, another line in its Lower Saxon branch also at the end of the 14th century and in its Danish branch in 1453. Finally, in 1663, the Eberstein-Naugard line, which had been based in Pomerania since 1274, died out.

The tower of a former royal Prussian optical telegraph station, no. 28, part of the telegraph line from Berlin to Koblenz, can be seen on the central part of the ridge. Remains of the building´s foundation for the station have also survived. The tower is not open to the public. An information board describes the history of the optical telegraph.

On the steep northern slopes of the Burgberg lies the Frauenschuhfläche ("Lady's Slipper Field"), a relic of the time when the slopes of the Burgberg were used to graze sheep and goats. The grazing of animals led to the creation of many areas of semi-dry grassland on which a specialised flora developed. These grasslands, with just a few sparse trees and juniper bushes, became the favourite habitats for the Lady's slipper orchid, hence the field's name, as well as the fringed gentian, meadow clary and wild marjoram. It has been placed under nature conservation and is accessible via a footpath. An information board describes how it was formed and the vegetation of the area.

== Hills ==
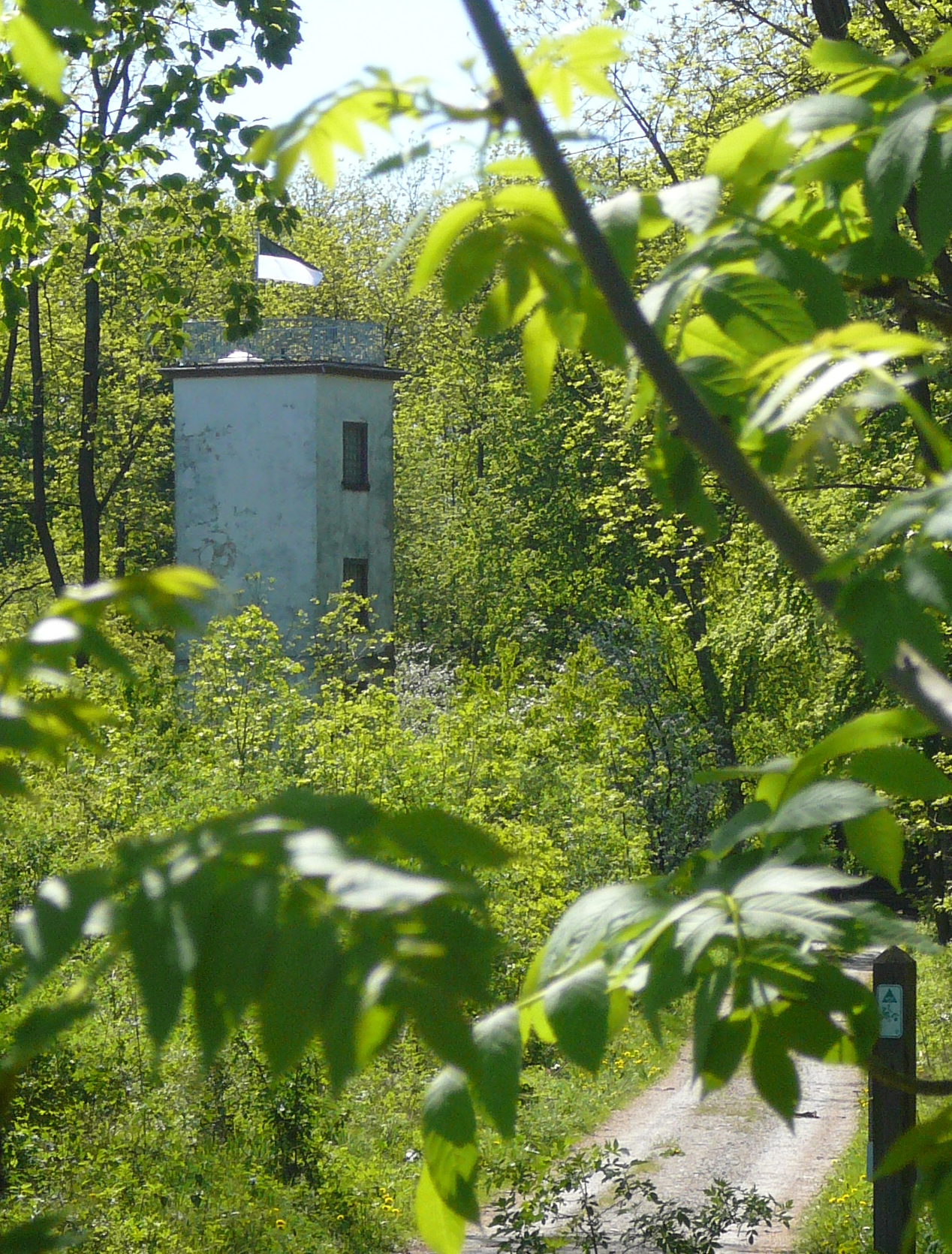
Telegraph Station

The hills of the Burgberg ridge include the:

- Großer Everstein (345.2 m above sea level (NN)) in the east of the Burgberg (with ruined walls of Everstein Castle)
- Bonhagenkopf (341.0 m) west centre of the Burgberg
- Burgberg (355.0 m) in the centre of the Burgberg (with its Telegraph Tower - not accessible)
- Friedberg (308.0 m) in the west of the Burgberg
- Kleiner Everstein (311.0 m) in the east of the Burgberg, also with ruined walls of Everstein Castle

== Streams ==
The streams on the Burgberg ridge include the:

- Beverbach (south and northeast on the Burgberg; eastern tributary of the Weser)
- Forstbach (north on the Burgberg; eastern tributary of the Weser)
