= Beverungen =

- Town
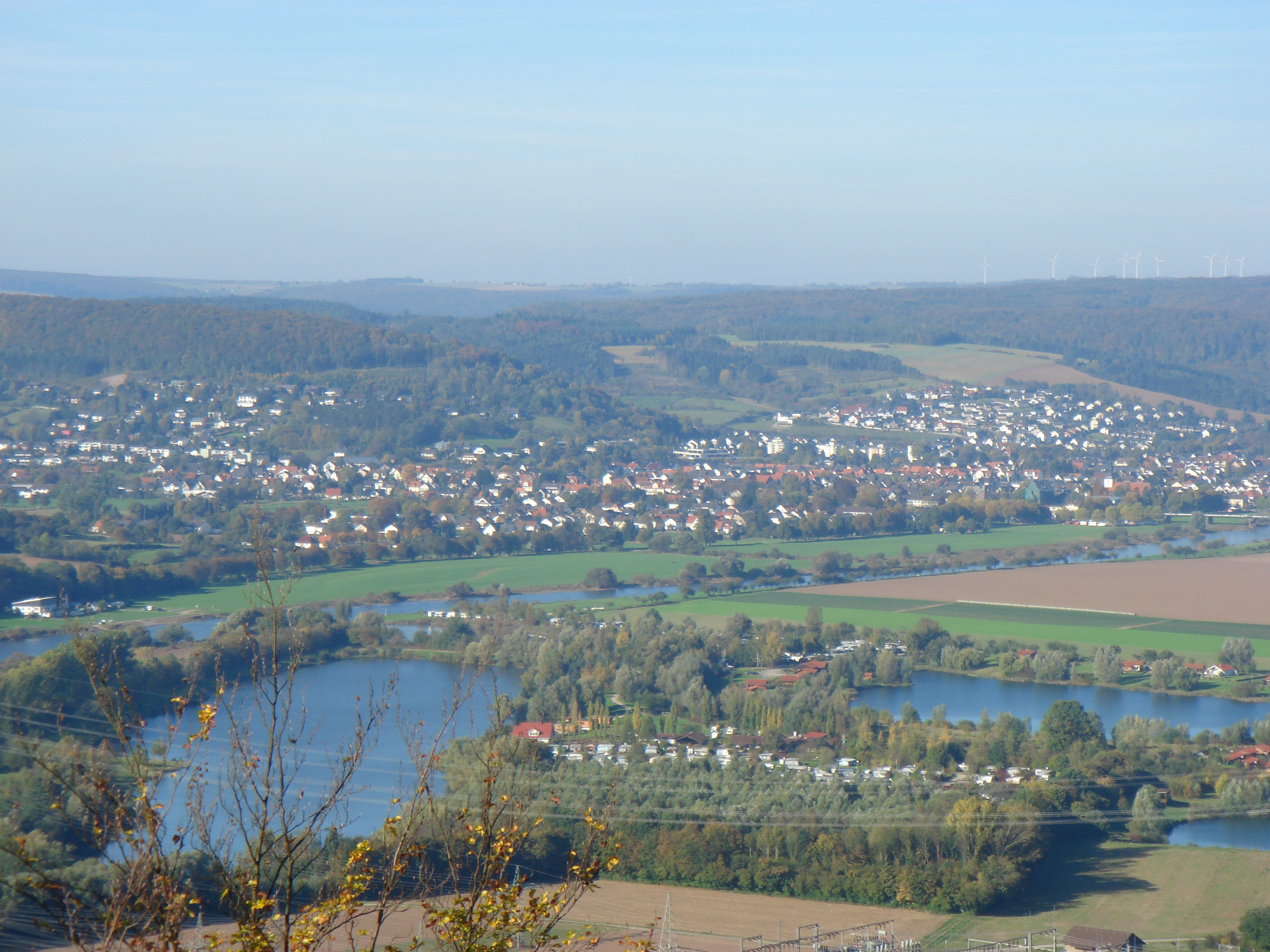

- Flag Coat of arms

- Location of Beverungen within Höxter district
- Interactive map of Beverungen
- Location within Germany Location within North Rhine-Westphalia
- Coordinates: 51°39′46″N 9°22′21″E
- Country: Germany
- State: North Rhine-Westphalia
- Admin. region: Detmold
- District: Höxter
- Subdivisions: 12

Government
  - Mayor (2025–present): Tino Wenkel (CDU)

Area
  - Total: 98.09 km^{2} (37.87 sq mi)
- Elevation: 100 m (330 ft)

Population (2025-12-31)
  - Total: 12,595
  - Density: 128.4/km^{2} (332.6/sq mi)
- Time zone: UTC+01:00 (CET)
  - Summer (DST): UTC+02:00 (CEST)
- Postal codes: 37688
- Dialling codes: 05273
- Vehicle registration: HX
- Website: http://www.beverungen.de

Beverungen (German pronunciation: [ˈbeːvəˌʁʊŋən]) is a town in Höxter district in North Rhine-Westphalia, Germany.

== Geography ==
=== Location ===
Beverungen lies in the Weser Uplands on the side of the Weser opposite Solling roughly 10 kilometres (6.2 mi) south of Höxter. In parts of the eastern municipal area near the river, the town has a share of the Weser Valley, and to the west the higher Oberwälder Land natural region. In Beverungen (main town), the river Bever empties into the Weser.

Geopolitically, Beverungen thereby lies in eastern North Rhine-Westphalia at the three-state point shared with Lower Saxony and Hesse. The Weser forms the border with the former.

One peculiarity in the town's location is to be found at the constituent community of Würgassen (German pronunciation: [ˈvʏʁˌɡasn̩], which lies on the Weser's right (here, north) bank, which would actually mean that the community were in Lower Saxony had it not been for the way a long-standing boundary dispute was settled in 1837. Even today, the boundary does not quite put all the community in North Rhine-Westphalia; the local Shooting Brotherhood's shooting range still lies partly in North Rhine-Westphalia and partly in Lower Saxony.

=== Neighbouring communities ===
The town of Beverungen lies right at the point common to the Bundesländer of North Rhine-Westphalia, Lower Saxony and Hesse. It borders in the west on the towns of Borgentreich and Brakel, in the north on the town of Höxter (all in Höxter district), in the east on the Samtgemeinde of Boffzen with its member communities of Boffzen and Fürstenberg and the market town of Lauenförde (all in Holzminden district), and the municipality-free area of Solling (Northeim district), and in the south on the towns of Bad Karlshafen and Trendelburg (both in Kassel district).

=== Constituent communities ===
Beverungen consists of the following 12 centres:

- Beverungen
- Amelunxen
- Blankenau
- Dalhausen
- Drenke
- Haarbrück
- Herstelle
- Jakobsberg
- Rothe
- Tietelsen
- Wehrden
- Würgassen

== History ==
The name "Beverungun" is known from as early as the mid 9th century. This was at first a noble estate with great landholdings, which soon developed into a village. About 1300, Bishop Bernhard of Paderborn began building work on the castle. The village was granted town rights in 1417. For over 500 years thereafter, Beverungen was a farming town.

The town reached both heights and depths through this time, one of the latter being the Plague striking the town in 1626, during the Thirty Years' War. The Hessians and the Swedes saw fit in 1632 to burn the town down, leaving only five houses standing afterwards. Thanks to the town's advantageous location, it soon recovered and quickly had a flourishing trade in grain, iron and glass from the glassworks in the Paderborner Land.

For centuries, Beverungen was the harbour town for the Prince-Bishopric of Paderborn. Even many people who went to the Americas began their journeys to the ocean steamers in Bremen here. Towards the end of the 19th century, a new economic upswing began with the railway's arrival and the building of a bridge across the Weser.

During World War II, a subcamp of Flossenbürg concentration camp was located here.

The current town of Beverungen with its 12 constituent communities was created in 1970.

=== Würgassen ===
Its existence witnessed by documentary proof from the 10th century, Würgassen likely already existed in Charlemagne's time. In 1698, the stately home (Schloss) was completed.

Although the local folklore holds that the village's name came about from the story in which "Charlemagne had the Würgassen dwellers strangled in the lanes for reverting to heathen customs", or in German, "Karl der Große hat die Würgasser wegen eines Rückfalles in heidnische Sitten in den Gassen erwürgen lassen", this is certainly untrue. Rather, the village's original name was Wirrigsen, more closely akin to the terms Wirura (the Weser) and Gisen (bubble up). As late as the early 20th century, the Weser at Würgassen was still underlain by a good many rocks, so that the water was churned up.

The villagers who did not work in agriculture in earlier days hired themselves out foremost as sailors in the shipping on the river Weser. In the 1970s, many people were employed at the newly built Würgassen Nuclear Power Plant, which was abandoned in 1995 and is now being dismantled.

== Population ==
Historical population

Year	Pop.	±% p.a.
1965	14,243	—
1970	14,951	+0.97%
1975	15,230	+0.37%
1980	15,339	+0.14%
1985	14,791	−0.72%
1990	15,240	+0.60%
1995	15,703	+0.60%

Year	Pop.	±% p.a.
2000	15,594	−0.14%
2005	14,923	−0.88%
2010	14,147	−1.06%
2015	13,442	−1.02%
2020	13,064	−0.57%
2025	12,595	−0.73%

Source: Landesdatabank Nordrhein-Westfalen

== Politics ==
The current mayor of Beverungen is Tino Wenkel of the CDU, who has been serving as mayor since 2025. In the 2025 local elections he was elected with 72,51 % of the vote.

=== City council ===
After the 2025 local elections, the Beverungen city council is composed as follows:

Party	Votes	%	+/-	Seats	+/-
Christian Democratic Union (CDU)	3,611	55.2	▲0.7	17	±0
Social Democratic Party (SPD)	1,086	16.6	▼4.6	5	▼1
Alternative for Germany (AfD)	958	14.7	New	4	New
Alliance 90/The Greens (Grüne)	557	8.5	▼7.6	3	▼2
Free Democratic Party (FDP)	257	3.9	▼4.3	1	▼1
Independent Hennemann	71	1.1	New	0	New
Valid votes	6,540	98.9			
Invalid votes	70	1.1			
Total	6,610	100.0		30	±0
Electorate/voter turnout	10,766	61.4			
Source: City of Beverungen

=== Coat of arms ===
Beverungen's civic coat of arms might heraldically be described thus: In azure three fleurs-de-lis argent, two above, one below.

The fleur-de-lis only appeared in the town's official seal in the 17th century. At first, there was only one, but the now familiar design with three came into use in the 18th century. The charge is believed to represent the Bishop of Paderborn. The arms were officially conferred on 12 May 1917, and confirmed in 1970.

The current arms do not bear any likeness to the original town seal, which came into use at the time when Beverungen was granted town rights. This seal showed a town gate and Saint Vitus.

== Economy and infrastructure ==
=== Transport ===
Beverungen is served by Lauenförde-Beverungen station on the Solling Railway (Sollingbahn) in the neighbouring community of Lauenförde, which is close to Beverungen. Trains run hourly to Ottbergen and Bodenfelde; from Bodenfelde, trains run to either Northeim or Göttingen. From Ottbergen there are connections to Altenbeken, Paderborn and Holzminden. Furthermore, the constituent community of Wehrden has a halt on the same line.

=== Public institutions ===
- Public Internet café
- Festival hall
- Würgassen nuclear power station (derelict)

=== Education ===
Beverungen has a school centre with a Hauptschule, a Realschule and a Gymnasium to which go students not only from Beverungen, but also from the neighbouring communities of Lauenförde in Lower Saxony and Trendelburg-Langental in Hesse.

== Events ==
In Beverungen, a shooting festival is held every other year. Every year at Whitsun, the "Orange-Blossom-Special" – a music festival hosted by the local record label/mail order company, Glitterhouse Records – is held. Some 2000 visitors attend from all over Europe.

== Twin towns – sister cities ==
Beverungen is twinned with:

- Briouze, France
