= Vogler (hill range) =

Mountain range

Coordinates: 51°56′N 9°34′E

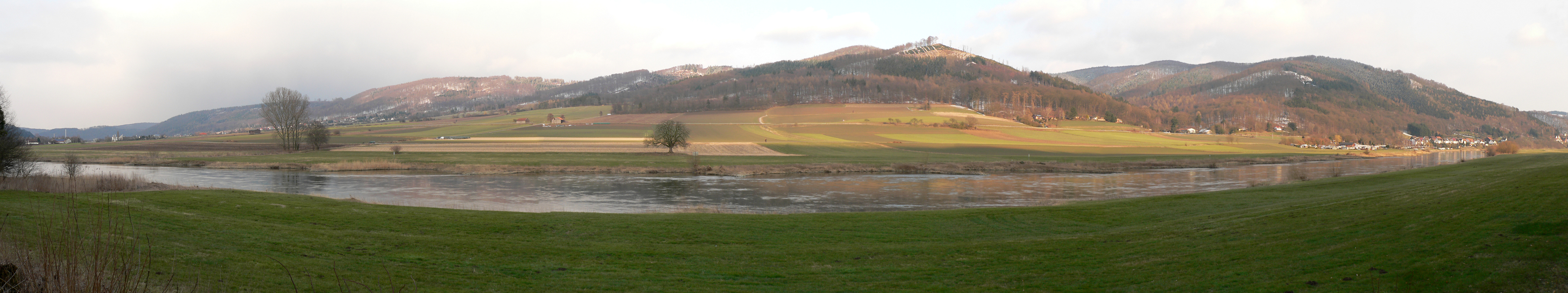
Vogler

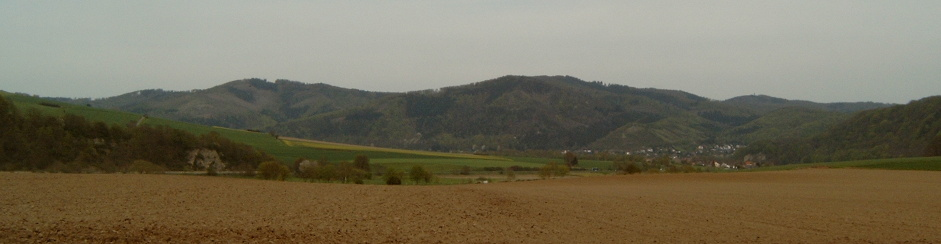
Vogler: view from Dölme

The Vogler is a range of hills, up to 460.4 m high, in the Weser Uplands in southern Lower Saxony (Germany).

Together with the Solling, the Vogler forms the Solling-Vogler Nature Park which lies a couple of kilometres further south.

== Geography ==
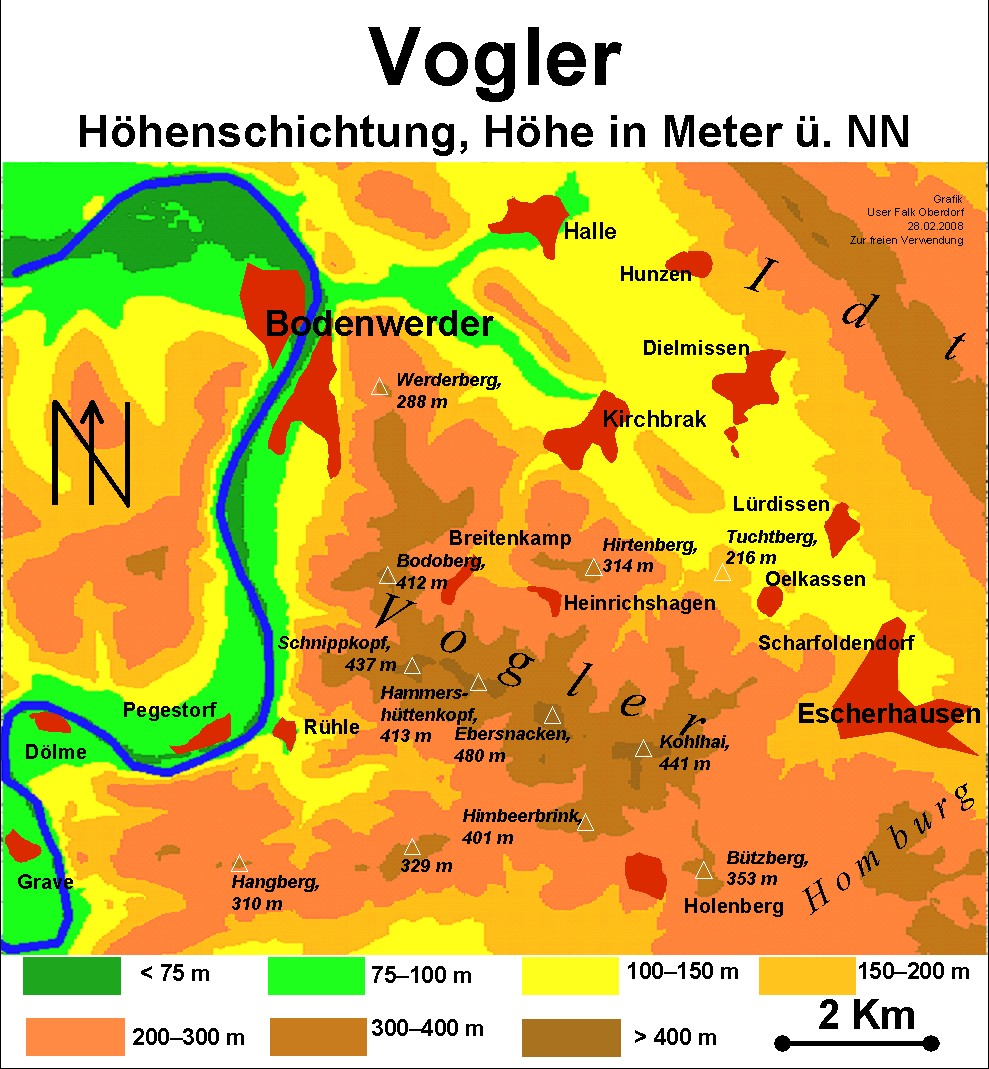
Vogler: relief map. Heights in metres above NN

The Vogler is located in the district of Holzminden between the hills of the Ith to the north, the Hils to the northeast, the Homburg Forest to the east, the Amtsberge to the southeast, the Solling to the south and the Burgberg to the south-southwest. It also lies in the triangle formed by the towns of Bevern, Bodenwerder and Eschershausen. The River Weser flows by the Vogler to the west heading north to the North Sea. To the north the Lenne, a western tributary of the Weser runs past in a northwesterly direction.

The Vogler drops steeply to the Weser through a height of 220 m. Nestling in its northern foothills is the village of Heinrichshagen, where Henry the Fowler was supposed to have trapped birds.

== Geology ==
The underlying rocks of the Vogler stem from the Bunter sandstone geological period.

== Places of interest ==
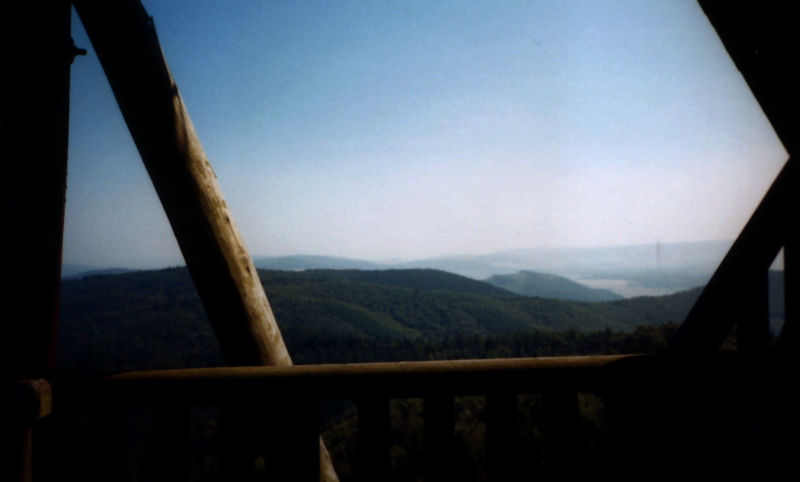
View from the Ebersnacken Tower over the Vogler

The places of interest, including natural and cultural monuments, in the Vogler include:

On the Ebersnacken (460.4 m) stands the Ebersnacken Tower, an observation tower, from which there is a good all-round view over the Vogler. Other such towers are the Bodo Tower (412 m) and the Königszinne (255,0 m). Also worth visiting is the monastery at Amelungsborn, which is southeast of the Vogler on the southwestern edge of the Odfelds.

== Hills ==
The hills in the Vogler include the following:

- Ebersnacken (460.4 m above sea level (NN)) – with the Ebersnacken Tower
- Kohlhai (440.8 m)
- Schnippkopf (437.0 m)
- Hammershüttenkopf (430.5 m; western summit)
- Hammershüttenkopf (412.5 m; eastern summit)
- Zimmertalskopf (412 m) – with the Bodo Tower
- Butterberg (402.0 m)
- Himbeerbrink (400.5 m)
- Ehrberg (370.5 m)
- Görtsberg (370 m)
- Streitberg (366.0 m)
- Lehmbrink (364.0 m)
- Bützeberg (352.6 m)
- Großer Schweineberg (349.8 m)
- Piepenberg (344.9 m)
- Flintenburg (331.5 m)
- Breitenkamper Berg (326.9 m)
- Steile Lieth (321.2 m)
- Hirtenberg (314.1 m)
- Wisselberg (310 m)
- Zimmerberg (309.0 m)
- Weinberg (302.4 m; near Holenberg)
- Werderberg (288.1 m)
- Himckeburg (280.2 m)
- Königszinne (255.0 m) – with the Königszinne observation tower
- Kappenberg (233 m)
- Weinberg (220.5 m; near Rühle)

== Towns and villages ==
The towns and villages in and around the Vogler include:

- Bevern
- Bodenwerder
- Eschershausen
- Golmbach
- Halle
- Holenberg
- Kirchbrak
- Rühle
