= Ebersnacken =

Hill in Kirchbrak, Germany

Coordinates: 51°55′45.10″N 9°33′56.58″E

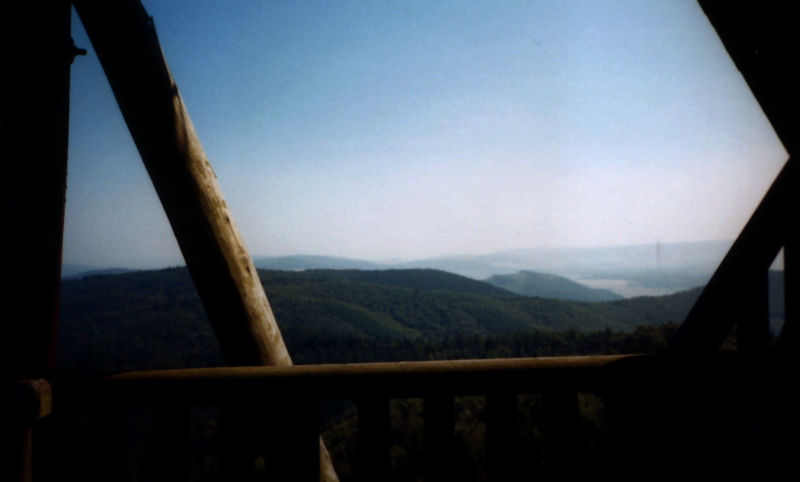
View from the tower on the Ebersnacken

Ebersnacken is a hill in Kirchbrak, Lower Saxony, Germany. It is the highest hill in the forested uplands of the Vogler, reaching 460 metres (1,510 ft) above sea level.

The hill is situated in the district of Holzminden about half the distance between Bodenwerder to the northwest and Stadtoldendorf to the southeast as the crow flies. No roads lead to Ebersnacken; it can only be reached on footpaths, for example from the Holenberg to the southeast.

== Ebersnacken Tower ==
At the hill's highest point stands an observation tower, the Ebersnacken Tower (Ebersnackenturm). First built in 1890, it was later expanded into a 13-meter-high wooden structure. After collapsing in 1946, the tower was rebuilt in 1960, renovated in 1990, and restored again in 2000. The tower is 26 metres (85 ft) tall and on a clear day one can see the as far as the Hermann Monument near Detmold westward and eastward to Brocken and the Harz mountains.
