= Boffzen (unincorporated area) =

- Unincorporated area
- Location of Boffzen within Holzminden district
- Interactive map of Boffzen
- Location within Germany Location within Lower Saxony
- Coordinates: 51°44′N 9°26′E
- Country: Germany
- State: Lower Saxony
- District: Holzminden

Area
  - Total: 23.37 km^{2} (9.02 sq mi)

Population (2025-12-31)
  - Total: 0
  - Density: 0.0/km^{2} (0.0/sq mi)
- Time zone: UTC+01:00 (CET)
  - Summer (DST): UTC+02:00 (CEST)

Boffzen is an unincorporated area in the German district of Holzminden. It is named after the bordering municipality Boffzen. It is located in the Solling.
