= Lauenförde-Beverungen station =

Railway station in Lauenförde, Germany

Lauenförde-Beverungen

General information
- Location: Lauenförde, Lower Saxony; Germany
- Coordinates: 51°39′30″N 9°23′32″E
- Line: Sollingbahn
- Platforms: 2

Other information
- Station code: n/a
- Category: 5
- Fare zone: VSN: 573; Westfalentarif: 77881
- Website: www.bahnhof.de

Services
Preceding station	NordWestBahn	Following station
Wehrden towards Höxter-Ottbergen	RB 85	Bad Karlshafen towards Göttingen
Location

Lauenförde-Beverungen is a railway station located in Lauenförde, Germany and is across the river from Beverungen. The station is located on the Sollingbahn and the train services are operated by NordWestBahn.

== Train services ==
The station is served by the following services:

- Local services RB 85 Ottbergen – Bad Karlshafen – Bodenfelde – Göttingen
