= Polle =

- Municipality
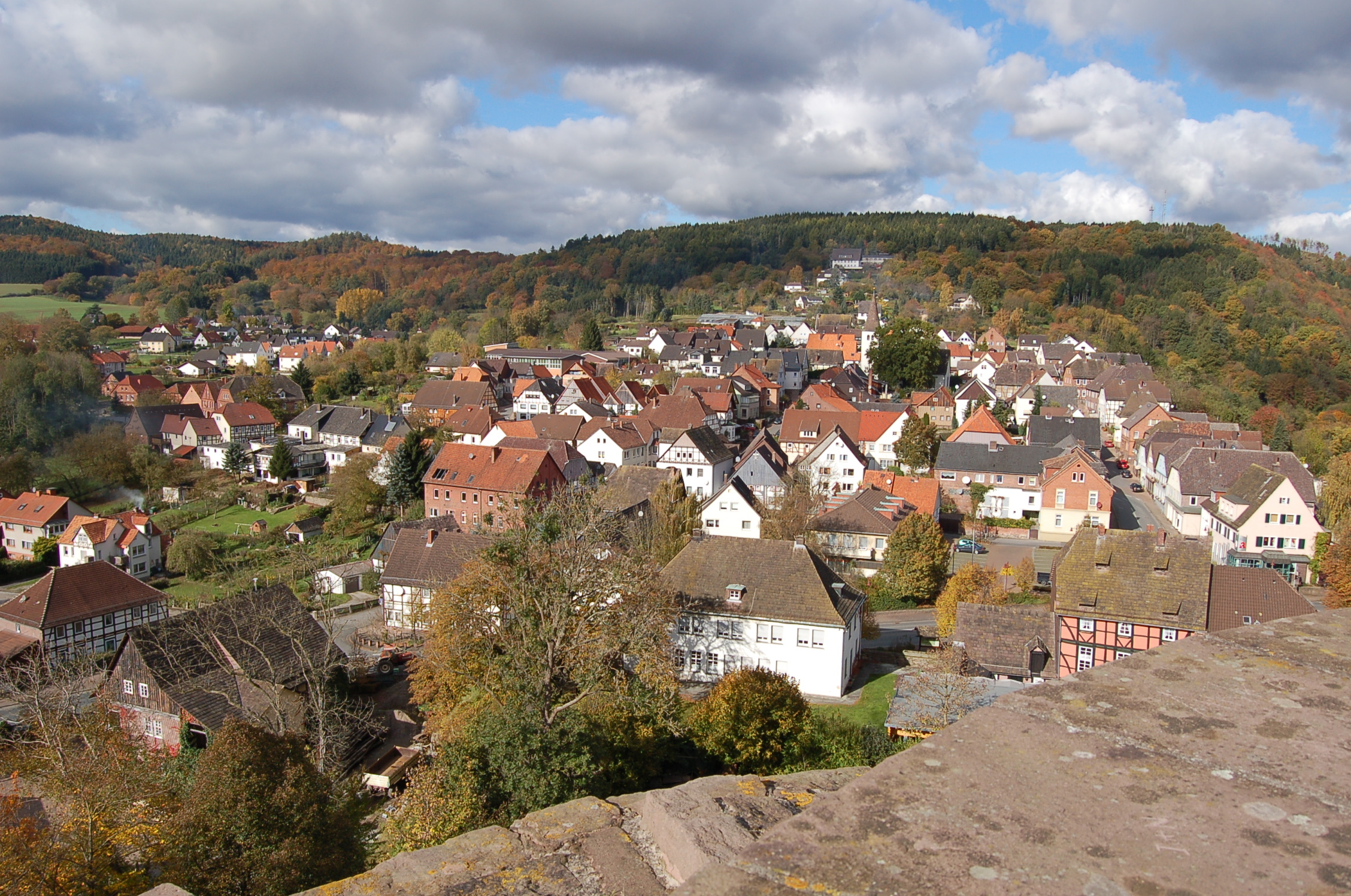
- Polle

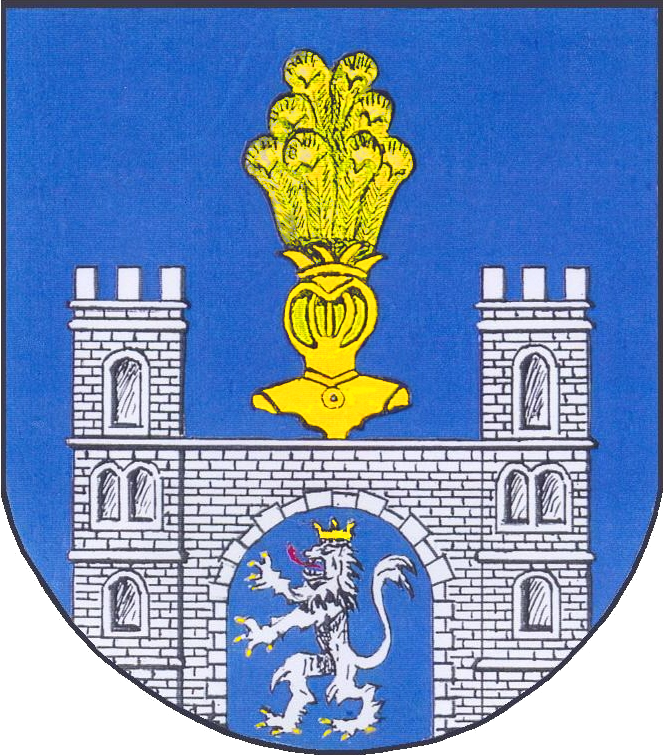
- Coat of arms

- Location of Polle within Holzminden district
- Interactive map of Polle
- Location within Germany Location within Lower Saxony
- Coordinates: 51°54′N 9°24′E
- Country: Germany
- State: Lower Saxony
- District: Holzminden
- Municipal assoc.: Bodenwerder-Polle

Government
  - Mayor: Hans Alexander Meinders (SPD)

Area
  - Total: 21.24 km^{2} (8.20 sq mi)
- Elevation: 90 m (300 ft)

Population (2025-12-31)
  - Total: 1,105
  - Density: 52.02/km^{2} (134.7/sq mi)
- Time zone: UTC+01:00 (CET)
  - Summer (DST): UTC+02:00 (CEST)
- Postal codes: 37647
- Dialling codes: 05535
- Vehicle registration: HOL
- Website: www.polle-weser.de

Polle (German pronunciation: [ˈpɔlə]) is a municipality in the district of Holzminden, in Lower Saxony, Germany. It is situated on the river Weser, approx. 8 km northwest of Holzminden.
