= Bevern, Lower Saxony =

Bevern
- Municipality
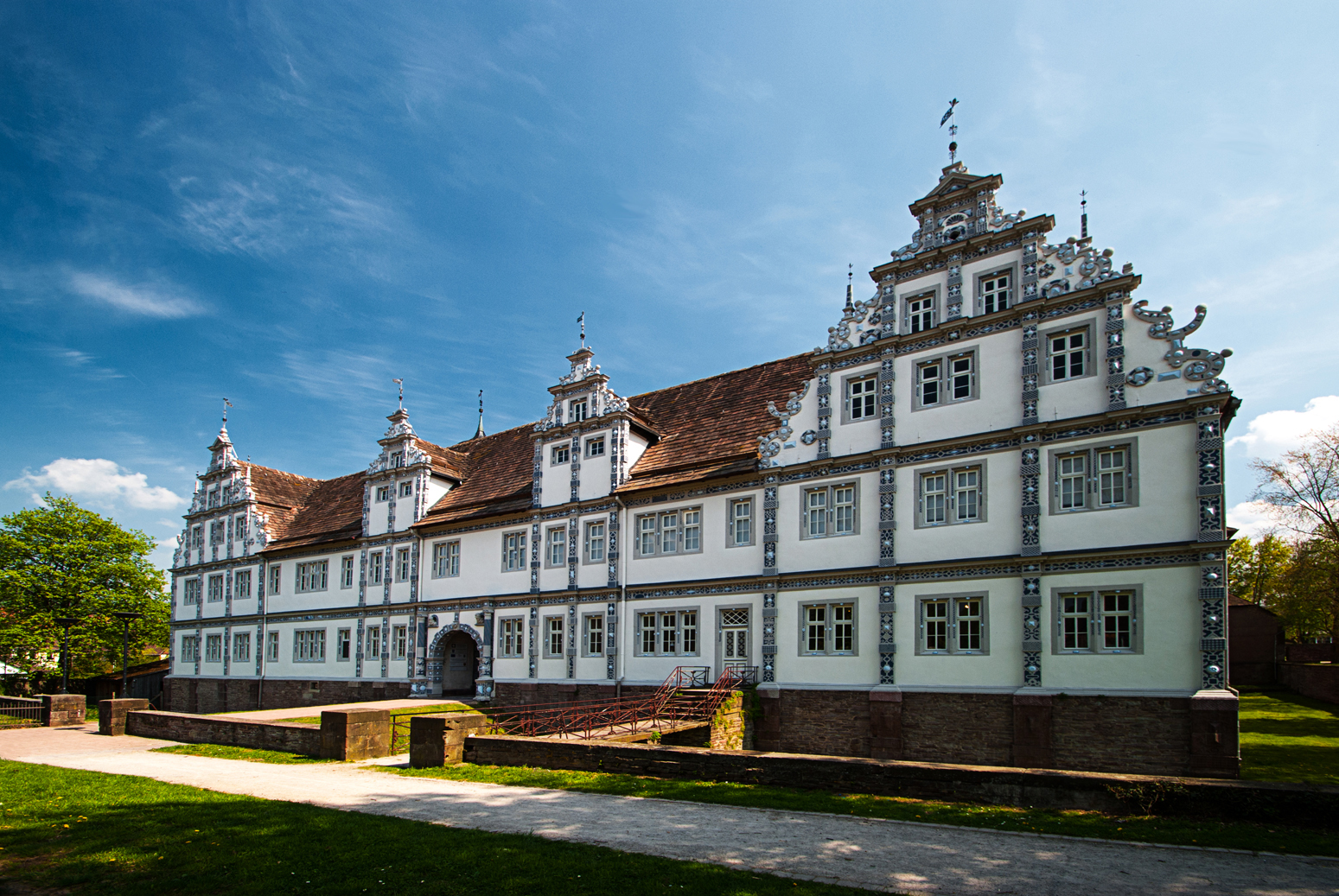
- Bevern Castle

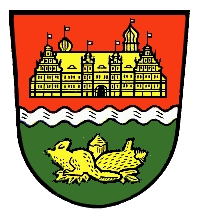
- Coat of arms

- Location of Bevern within Holzminden district
- Interactive map of Bevern
- Location within Germany Location within Lower Saxony
- Coordinates: 51°52′N 9°30′E
- Country: Germany
- State: Lower Saxony
- District: Holzminden
- Municipal assoc.: Bevern
- Subdivisions: 5

Government
  - Mayor: Burkhard Dörrier (FDP)

Area
  - Total: 33.33 km^{2} (12.87 sq mi)
- Elevation: 138 m (453 ft)

Population (2025-12-31)
  - Total: 3,697
  - Density: 110.9/km^{2} (287.3/sq mi)
- Time zone: UTC+01:00 (CET)
  - Summer (DST): UTC+02:00 (CEST)
- Postal codes: 37639
- Dialling codes: 05531
- Vehicle registration: HOL
- Website: www.bevern.de

Bevern (German pronunciation: [ˈbeːvɐn]) is a municipality in the District of Holzminden, Lower Saxony, Germany. It is the administrative seat of the Samtgemeinde ("collective municipality") of Bevern.

Bevern lies on the Weser river near its confluence with the Beverbach tributary, located between the Burgberg, Solling and Vogler hill ranges of the Weser Uplands. The municipal area comprises the villages of Bevern proper, Forst, Dölme, Lobach, Lütgenade, and Reileifzen.

The Saxon settlement of Byueran was first mentioned in a register of Corvey Abbey in 822. The construction of a church was documented in 1501; it was consecrated by the Cologne archbishop Hermann IV of Hesse in 1506. The community is chiefly known for Bevern Castle (Schloss Bevern), a Renaissance palace built as a manor house from 1603 to 1612. Purchased by the Welf dukes of Brunswick-Lüneburg during the Thirty Years' War in 1633, the building served as the residence of a cadet line, known as Brunswick-Bevern, from 1667 until the late 18th century.
