= Wehrden station =

Railway station in Beverungen, Germany

Wehrden (Weser)
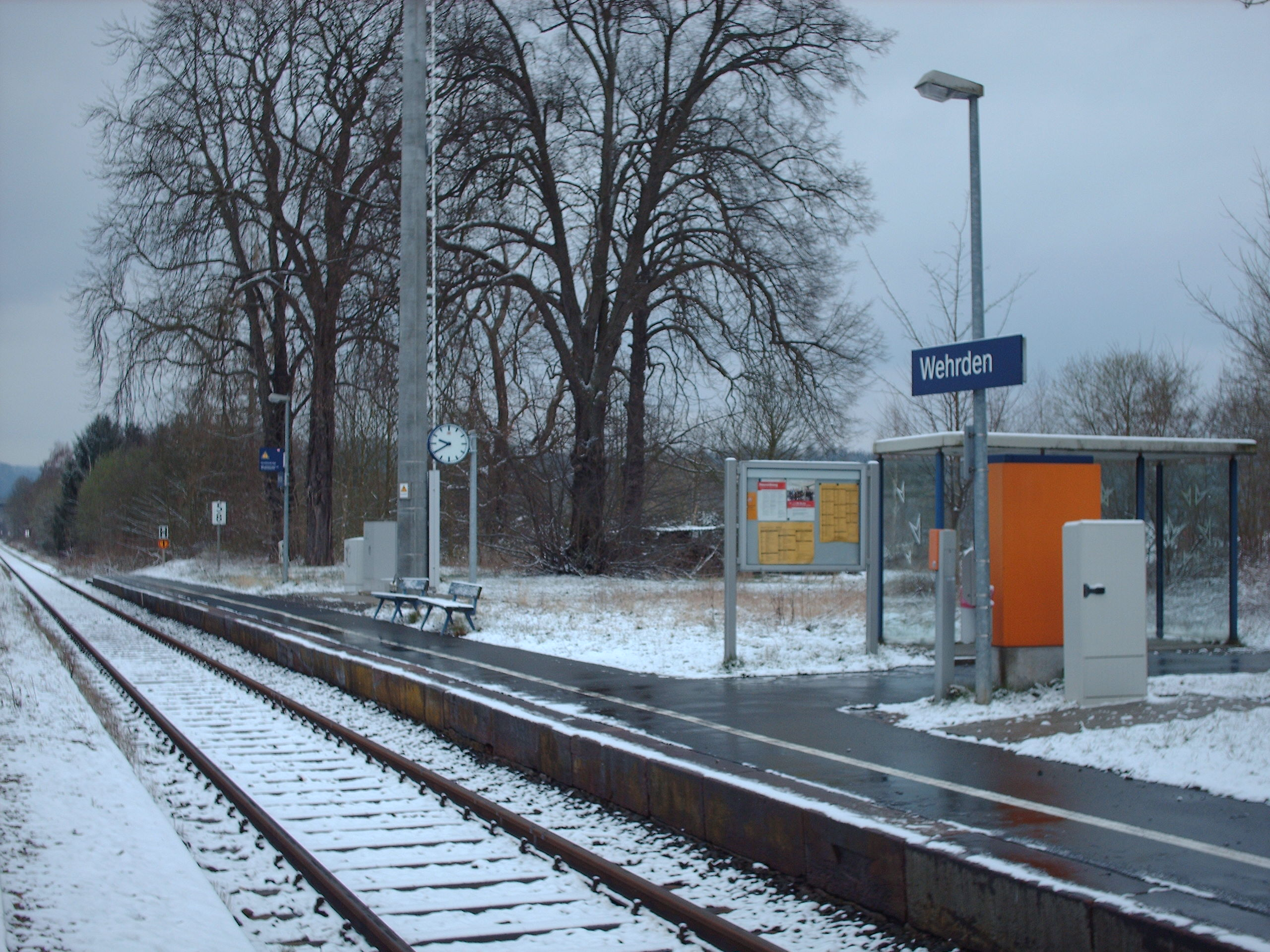
- Wehrden railway station

General information
- Location: Wehrden, North Rhine-Westphalia; Germany
- Coordinates: 51°42′34″N 9°23′00″E
- System: Through station
- Line: Sollingbahn

Other information
- Station code: n/a
- Category: 5
- Fare zone: Westfalentarif: 77882
- Website: www.bahnhof.de

Services
Preceding station	NordWestBahn	Following station
Höxter-Ottbergen Terminus	RB 85	Lauenförde-Beverungen towards Göttingen
Location

Wehrden is a railway station located in Wehrden, Germany. The station is located on the Sollingbahn and the train services are operated by NordWestBahn.

== Train services ==
The station is served by the following services:

- Local services RB 85 Ottbergen – Bad Karlshafen – Bodenfelde – Göttingen
