= Derental =

- Municipality
- Flag Coat of arms

- Location of Derental within Holzminden district
- Interactive map of Derental
- Location within Germany Location within Lower Saxony
- Coordinates: 51°42′N 9°26′E
- Country: Germany
- State: Lower Saxony
- District: Holzminden
- Municipal assoc.: Boffzen

Government
  - Mayor: Günter Rehling (FDP)

Area
  - Total: 9.23 km^{2} (3.56 sq mi)
- Elevation: 260 m (850 ft)

Population (2025-12-31)
  - Total: 565
  - Density: 61.2/km^{2} (159/sq mi)
- Time zone: UTC+01:00 (CET)
  - Summer (DST): UTC+02:00 (CEST)
- Postal codes: 37691
- Dialling codes: 05273
- Vehicle registration: HOL
- Website: www.derental.de

Derental is a municipality in the district of Holzminden, in Lower Saxony, Germany.
