= Jonatan Briel =

German director

Jonathan Briel
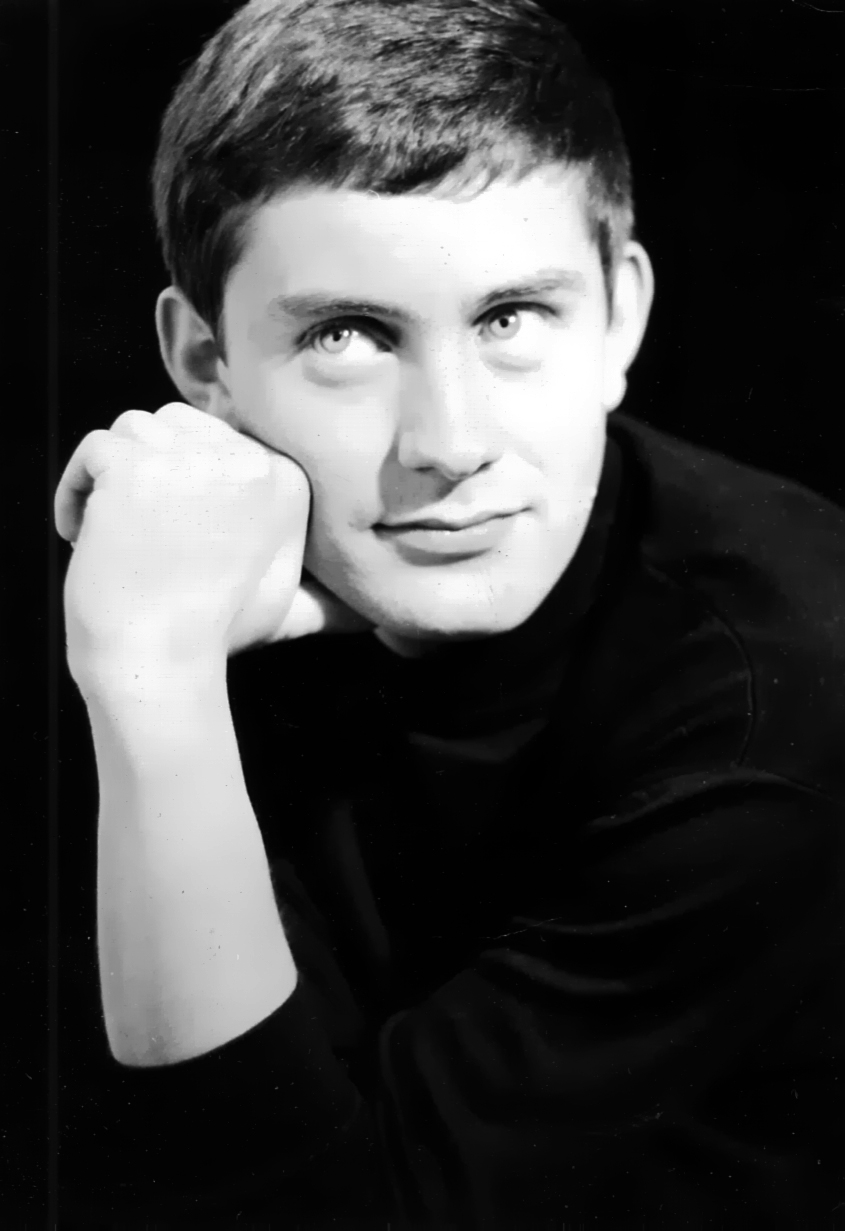
- Born: Jonatan Karl Dieter Briel; 9 June 1942; Bodenwerder, Lower Saxony, Germany
- Died: 26 December 1988 (aged 46); Berlin
- Citizenship: German
- Education: Freien (Free) University; Technische Universität Berlin; Berlin German Film and Television Academy
- Occupations: Director, Screenplay Author, Actor

Jonatan Karl Dieter Briel (9 June 1942 – 26 December 1988) was a German director, screenplay author, and actor. He was born in Bodenwerder, Lower Saxony, and died in Berlin. He was strongly influenced by the works of the 19th-century poets and dramatists, Heinrich von Kleist, Christian Friedrich Hebbel, and Friedrich Hölderlin.

== Education and work ==
Jonatan Briel grew up in Holzminden, not far from Hannover. From 1959 to 1962 he studied Business Administration. He established the Youth Film Studio of Holzminden in 1962 and remained its director until 1964. In 1965 he began his studies at the Free University Berlin and at Technische Universität Berlin, and became an assistant to Peter Lilienthal. The following year he transferred to the Berlin German Film and Television Academy (DFFB). In 1970 Briel became an independent film producer with Sender Freies Berlin (Transmitter Free Berlin), SFB. Berlin became Jonatan Briel’s adopted hometown from 1965 until his death there in 1988. In preparation for his work with film scripts and films, he toured the major cities of Europe, and lived and worked for a time in New York, Washington, San Francisco, Los Angeles and Boston.

Jonatan Briel was an artist who brought to his craft a wide-ranging knowledge of literature and film history, and was himself a poet by inclination. He taught at The Academy of Arts in Berlin since 1982. He wrote and directed plays for radio and television.

Jonatan Briel's films are available at the former Sender Freies Berlin (SFB), which between 1954 and 2003 was the public radio and television service for West Berlin, and is now part of the Berlin-Brandenburg Broadcasting network.

== Films ==
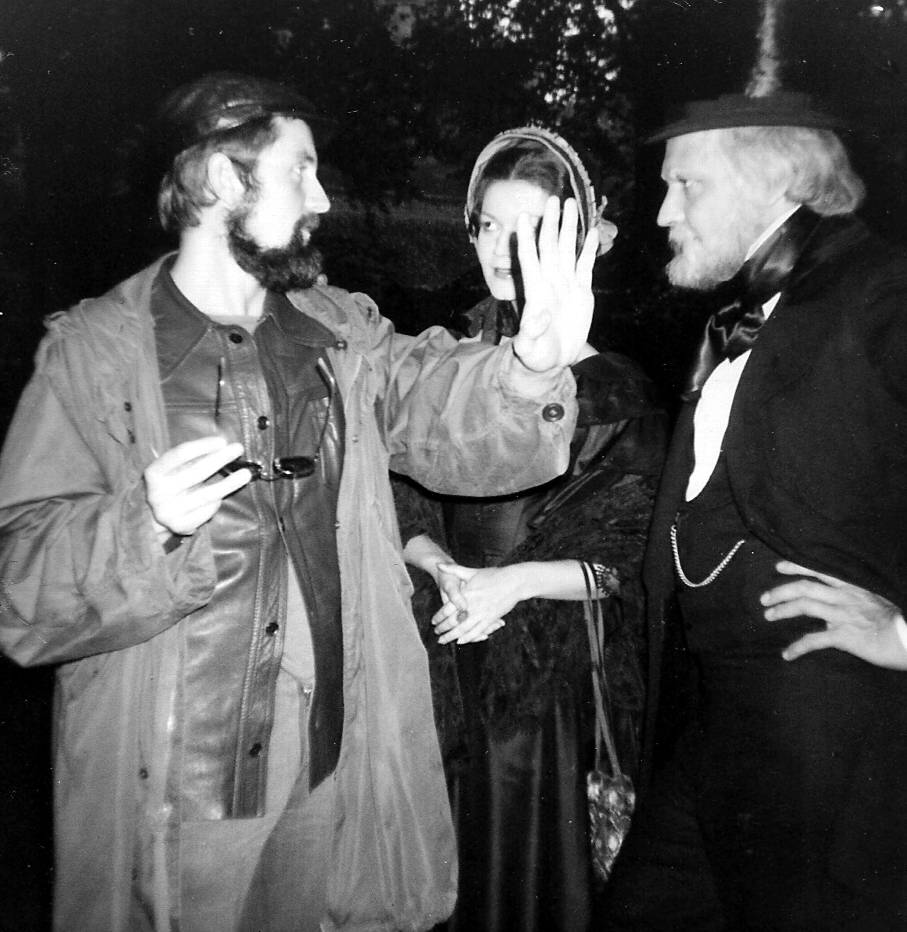
Filming Glutmensch: Jonatan Briel, Brigitte Reimers, Werner Brunn

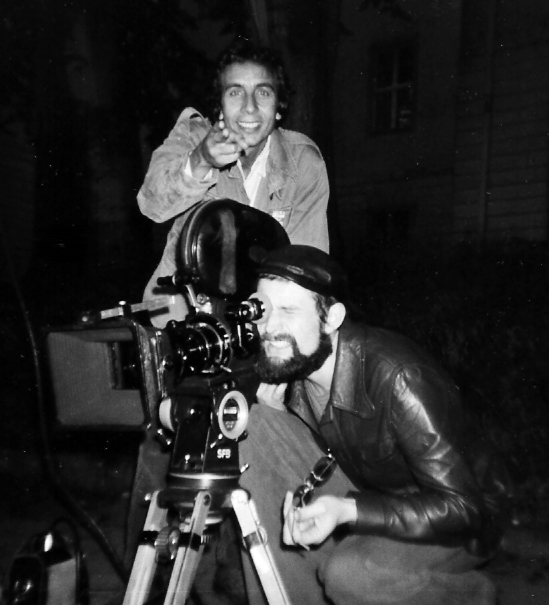
Filming Glutmensch: Jonatan Briel behind the camera

- 1969 Wie zwei fröhliche Luftschiffer (Like Two Merry Aeronauts), 85 min; DFFB Production. Writer and director.

Plot: The last three days in the life of the German poet and playwright Heinrich von Kleist. With his lover Henriette Vogel dying of cancer, Kleist philosophizes about life and welcomes his planned suicide.

- 1970 Gewogen und für zu schwer befunden (Weighed and Found Too Heavy); TV-Documentary, 45 min.; SFB Production.
- 1970 Berlin Berlin Berlin, 30 min., Experimental film. Writer, producer, and director.

Plot: Juxtaposition of the three historical Berlins, that of the imperial epoch, Berlin under fascist rule, and modern Berlin, with modern Berlin seen as an emerging European center.

- 1971 Jonatan Briels Lenz - Eine deutsche Physiognomie (Jonatan Briel’s Lenz – a German Physiognomy), 120 min.; ZDF Production. Writer and director.

Plot: Story of the life of Jakob Lenz, a friend of the young Goethe, with evident parallels to the life of the film director.

- 1971 Tago Mago, 120 min.; Experimental film; ZDF Production. Actor and director.

Plot: A story about the 1914 murder of the socialist leader Jean Jaures. Improvised script, shot on location in Mainz, Reims, Paris, Ibiza and Formentera.

- 1973 Ein sonderbarer Fall von Liebe (A Quite Strange Case of Love), 45 min.; SFB Production. Writer, producer and director.

Plot: Charles Baudelaire's "Les fleurs du Mal"

- 1975 Glutmensch (A Man Aglow), 90 min.; SFB and Literarisches Berliner Kolloquium. Writer, producer and director.

Plot: The life of German writer Friedrich Hebbel as seen through his own eyes and fantasies as he lies on his deathbed on the night of his fiftieth birthday. .

- 1979 Das Geheimnis (The Secret). Director.
- 1982 Untertänigst Scardanelli (Your Humble Servant Scardanelli). Writer and director.

Plot: Drama about Friedrich Hoelderlin – a poetic genius who, like the English poet William Blake, was caught up in artistic rapture bordering on madness.

- 1984 Dorian Gray in the Mirror of the Yellow Press. Actor (as "Dr. Spiegelwelt").

Plot: The head of an international press empire plots to increase circulation by manufacturing scandals.

- 1985 Die doppelte Fremde (The Double Stranger). Scriptwriter.

Plot: A film about the stages of the inner loss of one’s homeland.

== Radio scripts ==
- The stars, which smile on their hovel
- The attempt to sing a song
- The house of desires
- Elli, SO 36
- Katja
- As long as you love me, I cannot go wrong
- Kleist-Project Berlin 1987

== In other opinions - Critics ==
About the film Like Two Merry Aeronauts:

"…there is much conviction about this difficult film and contributing to the conviction, the leading prayer has even a striking resemblance to the poet playwright. Both technically and artistically an utterly unconventional film that requires a receptive viewer…"

"…the literary analysis of Heinrich von Kleist as it is created by K. D. Briel shows that it is well worth having faith in the German film…"

"… at last two extraordinary films. Produced by the German Academy of Film and Television in Berlin (DFFB), Karl Dieter Briel created "Wie zwei fröhliche Luftschiffer" (Like two merry aeronauts), the story of the double-Suicide of Heinrich von Kleist and Henriette Vogel at the Berlin Wannsee in 1811. Briel does almost completely without texts of his own – he draws extensively from the letters of Kleist and Vogel. Starting from Kleist’s first real troubles with life in Paris, he unfolds the story more and more up to Kleist’s dead, abstract waking dreams and the act of suicide, seen from different perspectives, standing at the end of the film. Briel blends documentary material from the years before 1811 and directed scenes showing the actors in historic costumes. At the end vision of the naked Kleist and the two lovers playing and fighting with plastic elements. This blending of different techniques makes it a fascinating film which is open to many interpretations. Briel's film is a result of intellectual penetration and thus very close to Kleist himself…"

About the film Berlin Berlin Berlin:

"… at the Locarno Festival Briel was highly successful with his film about Heinrich von Kleist and was given much attention abroad, where his film was widely discussed and reviewed in the USA, France and Italy. His film about Berlin deserves even more attention. It was shown on the German Television at the night-studio-series "Camera-Films". It is - at last – a film which demonstrates the courage to compose impressions of Berlin, completely detached from any ‚modern’ trend. It is necessary to see the color version because color is here one of the main composition factors. Past and future times are shown in warm and normal shades, the present is however painted in manipulated and detachment-provoking colours. The Gedächtniskirche (Imperial Memorial Church) appears in an empty grey-blue, the Reichstag (Parliament) – shot from a railway territory – freezes in a pale midnight-blue, empty railway sidings in the front – itself becoming an empty siding. The Russian Church appears in all shades of blue, radiating in turquoise and rose (pink). This is the scenario of the colors. Much more important is the whole film as a >picture-puzzle<, showing a threefold face of Berlin: the old imperial and fascist Berlin, the old "Reichshauptstadt", then the newly constructed Berlin, built into cool sand, around the Breitscheidplatz, the New Memorial Church. And finally Berlin as it is talked about by the old (lady) Berlin Lady Adelheide Pickert – the Berlin to be – the Berlin which is becoming European Center without dead weights from the past, the geographical center of a free Europe. Here – as Briel puts it – the future of the progressive young people may be created. In fact, the portrait of the 90-year-old former great singer Adelheide Pickert (famous as Mahler-interprete around 1910) is not manipulated into this film- her person corresponds exactly to the outward emptiness. The things she says are very far out, strangely brilliant – creating a counterpoint to the filmed atmosphere of the 1970 Berlin summer. With a first-class photography, a brilliant and imaginative scenario, far away from any cliche, supported by the long-drawn, mind-penetrating and beautifully composed music, making visible the essence, this film shows that images can be regarded as they are – that there is nothing mysterious about them. There is no cliché, there is poetry, there is tension created by colors and cuts."
