= Boffzen (Samtgemeinde) =

- Samtgemeinde
- Location of Boffzen within Holzminden district
- Interactive map of Boffzen
- Location within Germany Location within Lower Saxony
- Coordinates: 51°45′N 9°23′E
- Country: Germany
- State: Lower Saxony
- District: Holzminden
- Seat: Boffzen
- Subdivisions: 4 municipalities

Area
  - Total: 37.8 km^{2} (14.6 sq mi)

Population (2025-12-31)
  - Total: 6,140
  - Density: 162/km^{2} (421/sq mi)
- Time zone: UTC+01:00 (CET)
  - Summer (DST): UTC+02:00 (CEST)
- Website: www.boffzen.de

Boffzen is a Samtgemeinde ("collective municipality") in the district of Holzminden, in Lower Saxony, Germany. Its seat is in the municipality Boffzen.

The Samtgemeinde Boffzen consists of the following municipalities:

1. Boffzen
2. Derental
3. Fürstenberg
4. Lauenförde
