= Bever (Weser) =

River in Germany

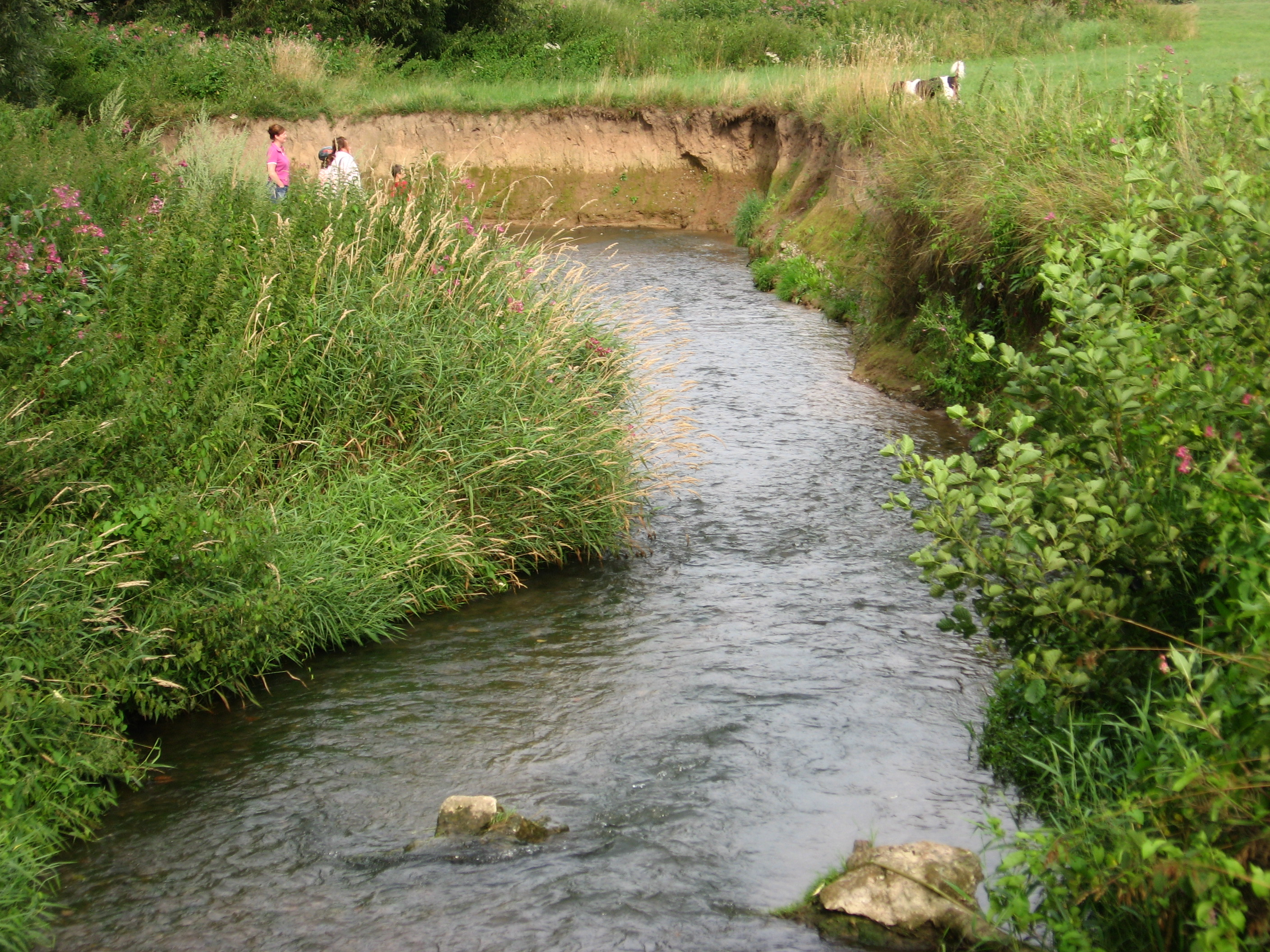

Location
- Country: Germany
- State: North Rhine-Westphalia

Physical characteristics
- Mouth
  - location: Weser
  - coordinates: 51°39′25″N 9°22′38″E
- Length: 10.5 km (6.5 mi)

Basin features
- Progression: Weser→ North Sea

Bever (German pronunciation: [ˈbeːvɐ]) is a river of North Rhine-Westphalia, Germany. It flows into the Weser in Beverungen.

== History ==
On December 1, 2006, the water became contaminated after a slurry accident. A fist-sized crack in the fermenter of the Biogas Plant in Borgentreich-Natzungen brought large quantities of fermentation substrate into the Eselsbach and thus into the Bever, causing a massive fish die out. Trout, eels, grayling, crayfish, and other aquatic animals died, which also affected the adjacent fishpond sites.

== See also ==
- List of rivers of North Rhine-Westphalia
