= Bodenwerder-Polle =

Samtgemeinde in Lower Saxony

- Samtgemeinde
- Location of Bodenwerder-Polle within Holzminden district
- Interactive map of Bodenwerder-Polle
- Location within Germany Location within Lower Saxony
- Coordinates: 51°58′N 9°31′E
- Country: Germany
- State: Lower Saxony
- District: Holzminden
- Seat: Bodenwerder
- Subdivisions: 11 municipalities

Area
  - Total: 215.37 km^{2} (83.15 sq mi)

Population (2025-12-31)
  - Total: 13,193
  - Density: 61.257/km^{2} (158.66/sq mi)
- Time zone: UTC+01:00 (CET)
  - Summer (DST): UTC+02:00 (CEST)
- Website: www.muenchhausenland.de

Bodenwerder-Polle is a Samtgemeinde ("collective municipality") in the district of Holzminden, in Lower Saxony, Germany. Its seat is in the town Bodenwerder. It was formed on 1 January 2010 by the merger of the former Samtgemeinden Bodenwerder and Polle.

The Samtgemeinde Bodenwerder-Polle consists of the following municipalities:

1. Bodenwerder
2. Brevörde
3. Halle
4. Hehlen
5. Heinsen
6. Heyen
7. Kirchbrak
8. Ottenstein
9. Pegestorf
10. Polle
11. Vahlbruch
