= Brevörde =

- Municipality
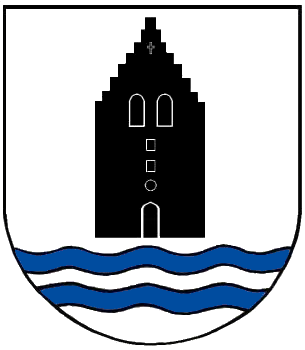
- Coat of arms

- Location of Brevörde within Holzminden district
- Interactive map of Brevörde
- Location within Germany Location within Lower Saxony
- Coordinates: 51°55′N 09°25′E
- Country: Germany
- State: Lower Saxony
- District: Holzminden
- Municipal assoc.: Bodenwerder-Polle

Government
  - Mayor: Winfried Hoch

Area
  - Total: 13.59 km^{2} (5.25 sq mi)
- Elevation: 97 m (318 ft)

Population (2025-12-31)
  - Total: 554
  - Density: 40.8/km^{2} (106/sq mi)
- Time zone: UTC+01:00 (CET)
  - Summer (DST): UTC+02:00 (CEST)
- Postal codes: 37647
- Dialling codes: 05535
- Vehicle registration: HOL
- Website: www.polle-weser.de

Brevörde is a municipality in the district of Holzminden, in Lower Saxony, Germany.
