= Pegestorf =

- Municipality
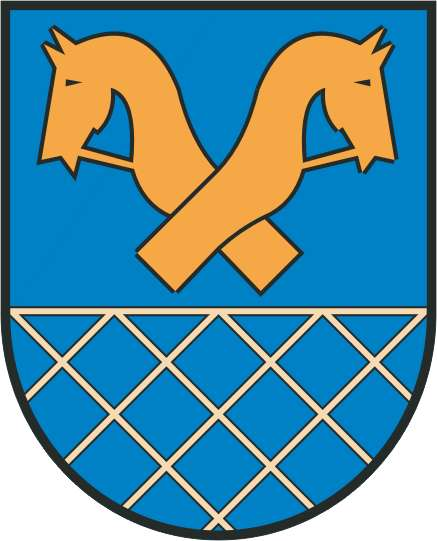
- Coat of arms

- Location of Pegestorf within Holzminden district
- Interactive map of Pegestorf
- Location within Germany Location within Lower Saxony
- Coordinates: 51°56′N 9°30′E
- Country: Germany
- State: Lower Saxony
- District: Holzminden
- Municipal assoc.: Bodenwerder-Polle
- Subdivisions: 2

Government
  - Mayor: Dirk Pommer

Area
  - Total: 8.32 km^{2} (3.21 sq mi)
- Elevation: 104 m (341 ft)

Population (2025-12-31)
  - Total: 394
  - Density: 47.4/km^{2} (123/sq mi)
- Time zone: UTC+01:00 (CET)
  - Summer (DST): UTC+02:00 (CEST)
- Postal codes: 37619
- Dialling codes: 05533
- Vehicle registration: HOL
- Website: www.gemeinde-pegestorf.de

Pegestorf is a municipality in the district of Holzminden, in Lower Saxony, Germany.
