= Beverbach (Weser) =

River in Germany

Location
- Country: Germany
- State: Lower Saxony

Physical characteristics
- Mouth
  - location: Weser
  - coordinates: 51.8765°N 9.4682°E

Basin features
- Progression: Weser→ North Sea

Beverbach is a river of Lower Saxony, Germany. It flows into the Weser near Bevern.

== See also ==
- List of rivers of Lower Saxony
