= Heyen =

- Municipality
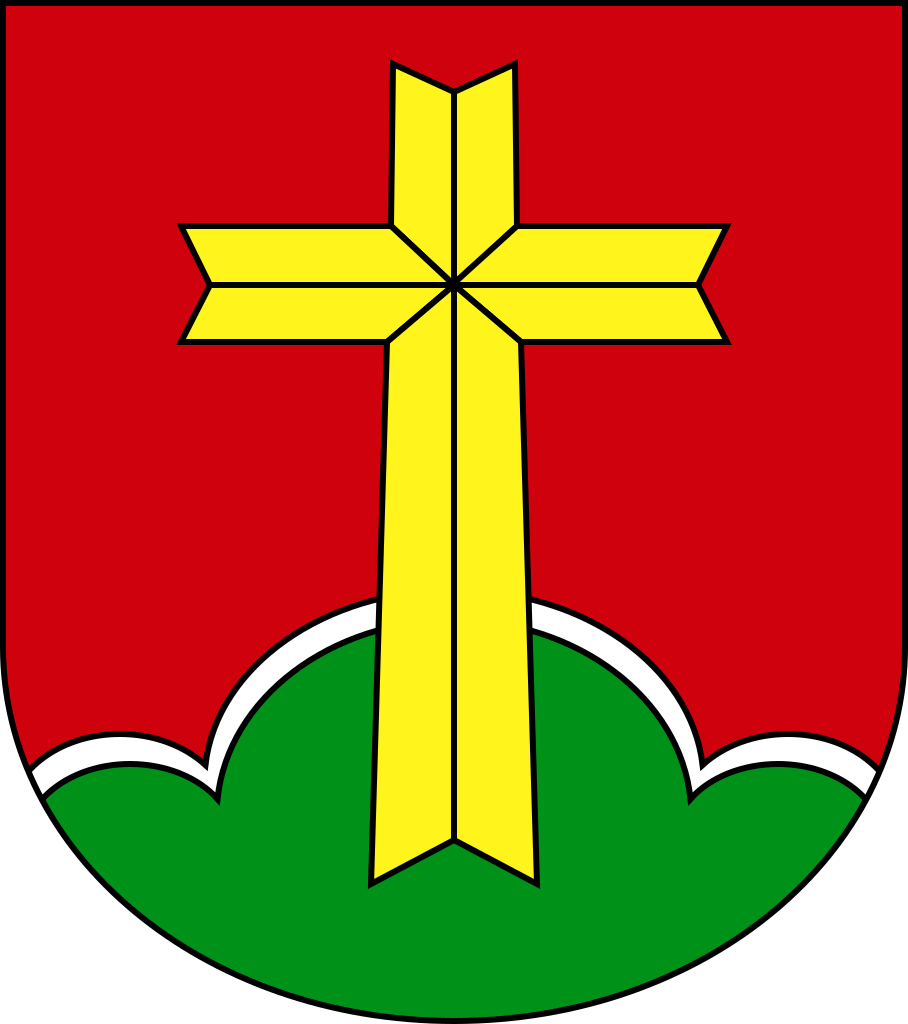
- Coat of arms

- Location of Heyen within Holzminden district
- Interactive map of Heyen
- Location within Germany Location within Lower Saxony
- Coordinates: 52°1′N 9°31′E
- Country: Germany
- State: Lower Saxony
- District: Holzminden
- Municipal assoc.: Bodenwerder-Polle

Government
  - Mayor: Michael Zieseniß

Area
  - Total: 8.30 km^{2} (3.20 sq mi)
- Elevation: 138 m (453 ft)

Population (2025-12-31)
  - Total: 412
  - Density: 49.6/km^{2} (129/sq mi)
- Time zone: UTC+01:00 (CET)
  - Summer (DST): UTC+02:00 (CEST)
- Postal codes: 37619
- Dialling codes: 05533
- Vehicle registration: HOL
- Website: www.gemeinde-heyen.de

Heyen is a municipality in the district of Holzminden, in Lower Saxony, Germany.
