= Kirchbrak =

- Municipality
- Location of Kirchbrak within Holzminden district
- Interactive map of Kirchbrak
- Location within Germany Location within Lower Saxony
- Coordinates: 51°58′N 9°35′E
- Country: Germany
- State: Lower Saxony
- District: Holzminden
- Municipal assoc.: Bodenwerder-Polle
- Subdivisions: 5

Government
  - Mayor: Wilhelm Brennecke

Area
  - Total: 18.39 km^{2} (7.10 sq mi)
- Elevation: 299–460 m (981–1,509 ft)

Population (2025-12-31)
  - Total: 846
  - Density: 46.0/km^{2} (119/sq mi)
- Time zone: UTC+01:00 (CET)
  - Summer (DST): UTC+02:00 (CEST)
- Postal codes: 37619
- Dialling codes: 05533
- Vehicle registration: HOL
- Website: www.kirchbrak.de

Kirchbrak is a municipality in the district of Holzminden, in Lower Saxony, Germany.

The municipality lies only a few kilometers east of Bodenwerder. Through Kirchbrak flows a small river called Lenne, a tributary of the Weser.

It consists of five small villages and hamlets, named Kirchbrak, Westerbrak, Osterbrak, Breitenkamp and Heinrichshagen.

Kirchbrak is situated on the northern edge of the hilly area Vogler.

Kirchbrak has two monumental buildings:

- the Lutheran Saint Michael's Church, built in the 12th century, containing a remarkable 18th-century church organ and a 17th-century altarpiece; only open to visitors for attending Sunday services.
- the AMCO-Fabrikerweiterungsgebäude (AMCO factory enlargement building; built in 1925), an industrial monument designed by the famous architects Walter Gropius and Ernst Neufert; especially remarkable, because it is one of the earliest architectural creations in which Neufert took part.

== Gallery ==
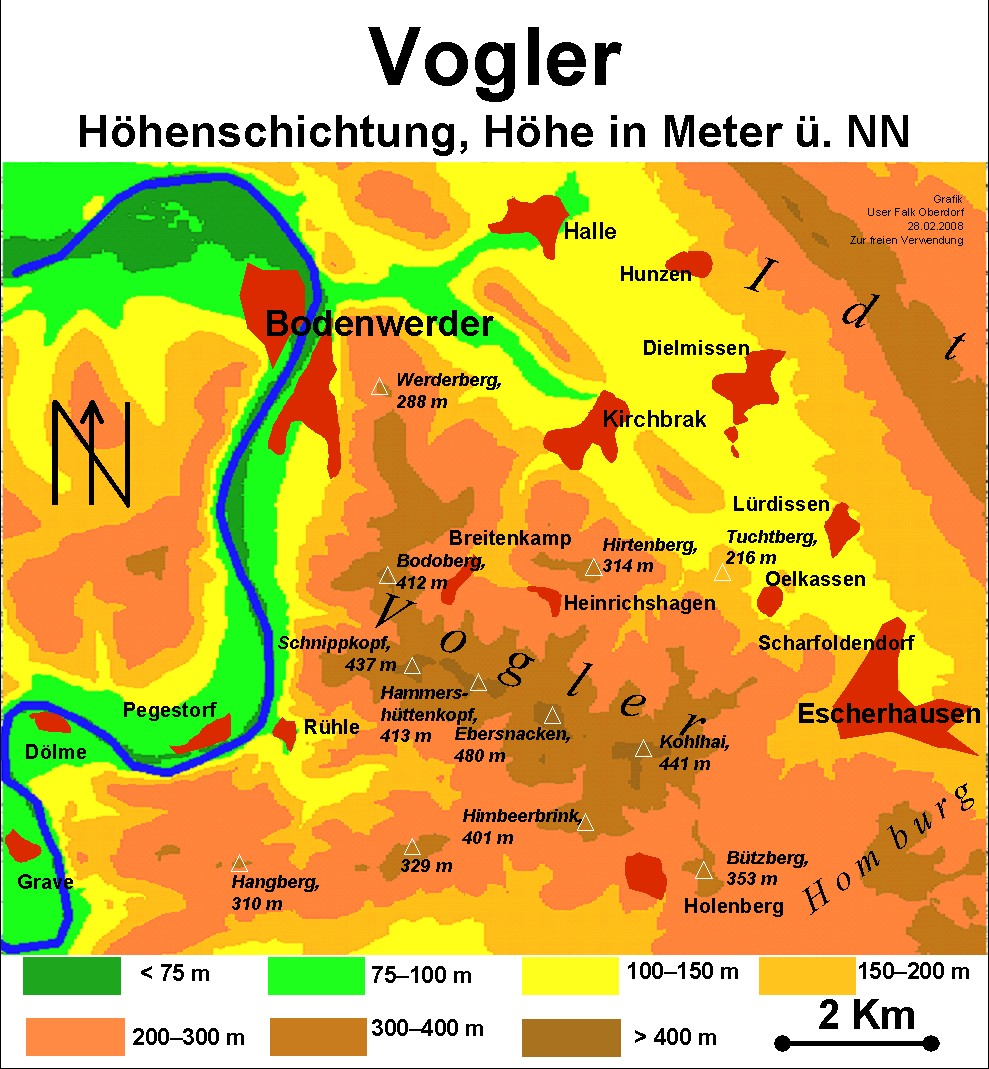
Map of the Vogler area

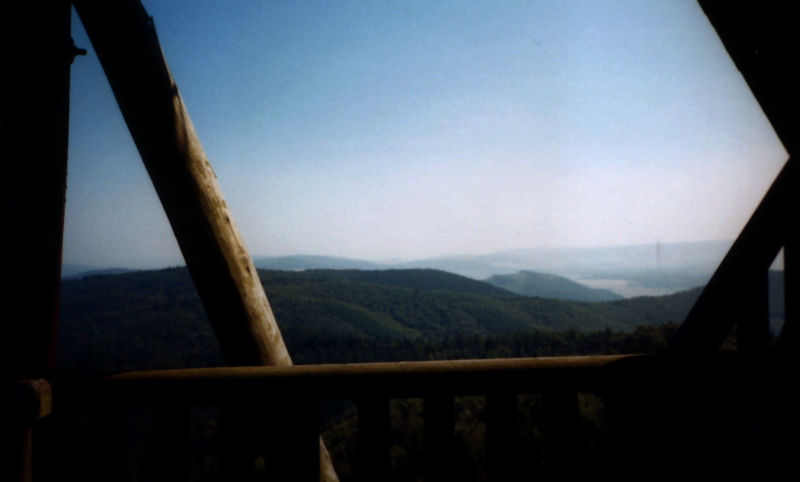
View from the hill Ebersnacken close to Kirchbrak

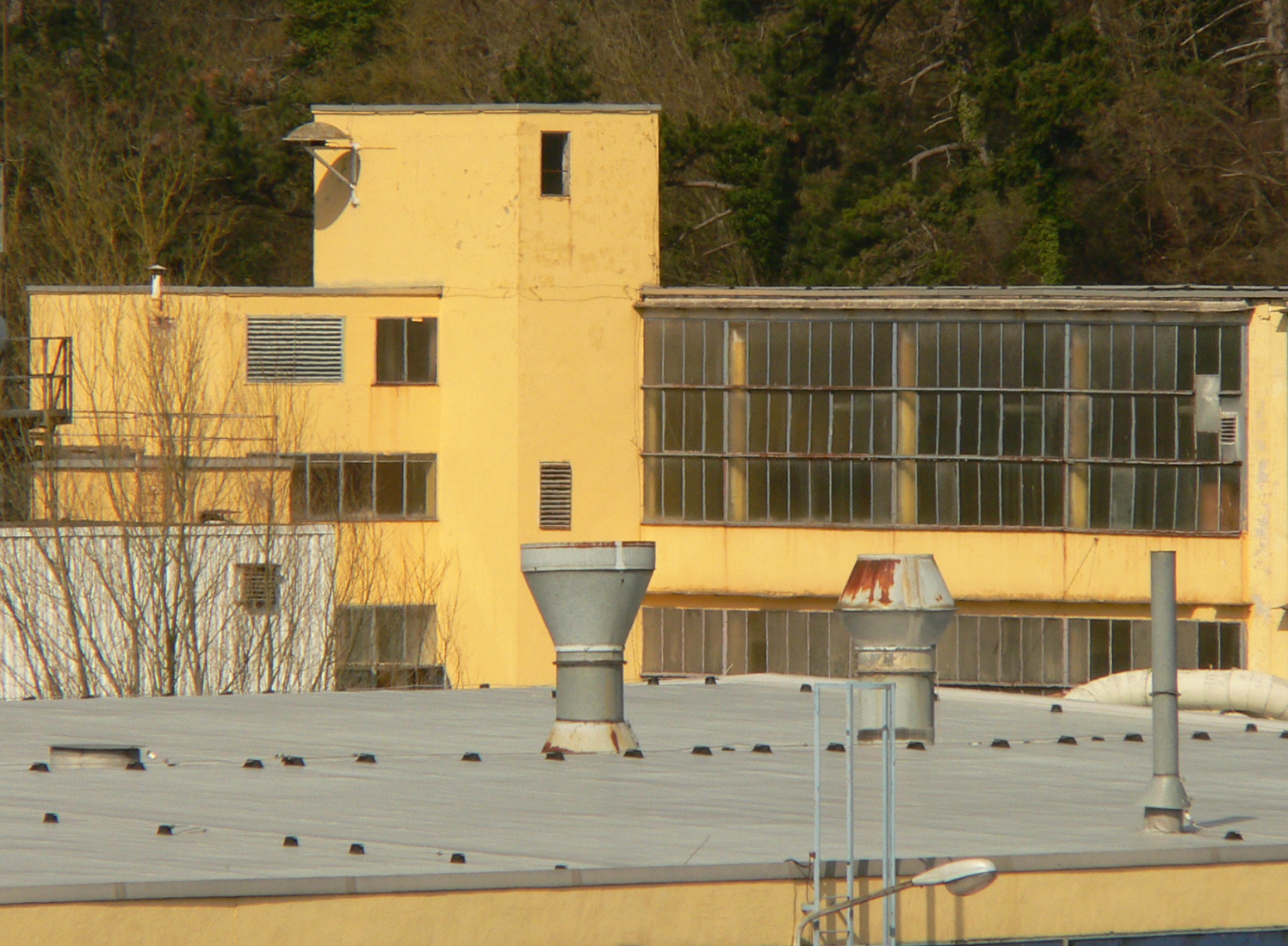
AMCO-Fabrikerweiterungs-gebäude

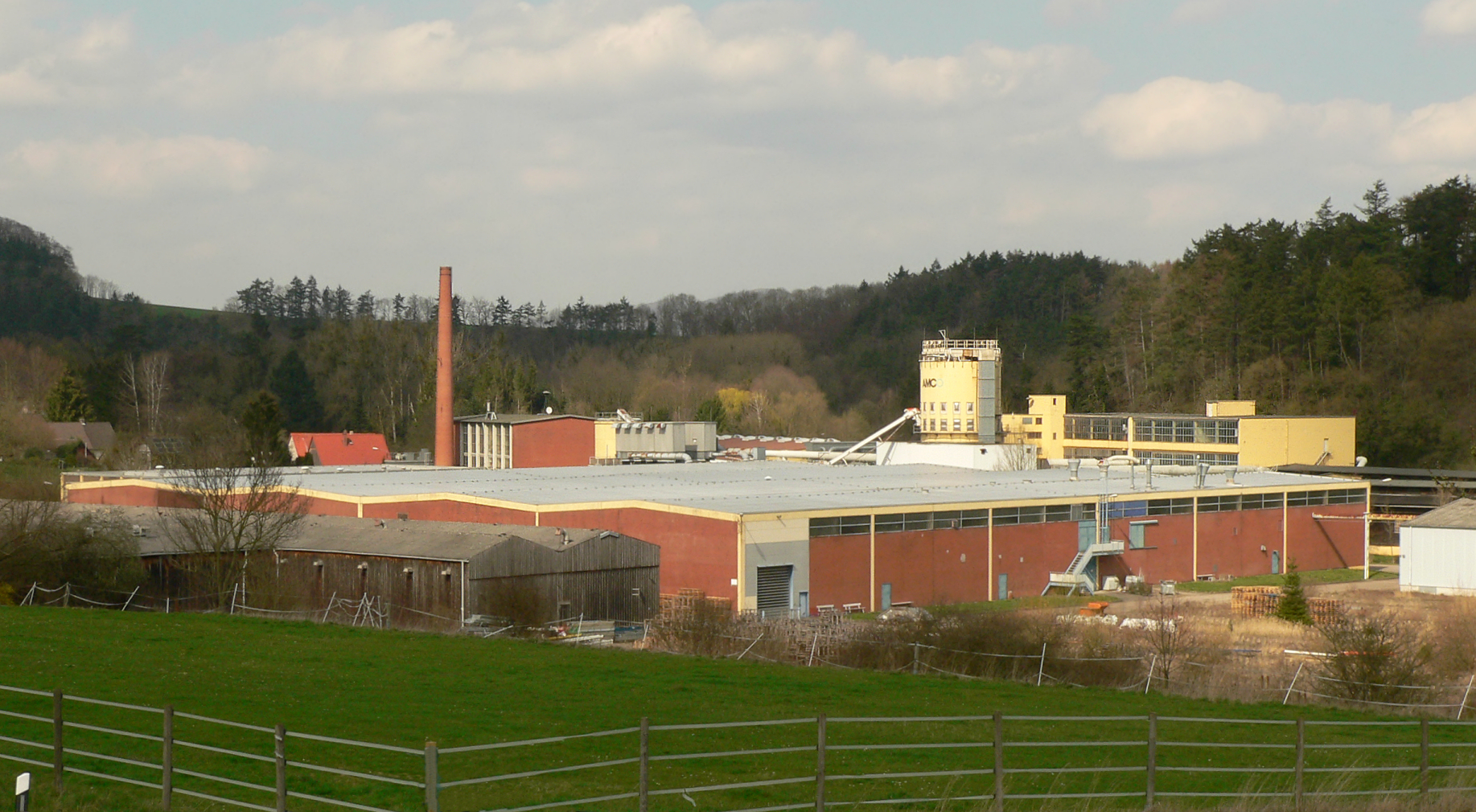
The entire AMCO- factory in 2019; the yellow segment in the background is the monumental part

== People ==
- Andreas Rebers (born 1958), German cabaret artist, author and musician
