= Ottenstein =

- Municipality
- Location of Ottenstein within Holzminden district
- Interactive map of Ottenstein
- Location within Germany Location within Lower Saxony
- Coordinates: 51°57′N 09°24′E
- Country: Germany
- State: Lower Saxony
- District: Holzminden
- Municipal assoc.: Bodenwerder-Polle
- Subdivisions: 2

Government
  - Mayor: Manfred Weiner (CDU)

Area
  - Total: 13.59 km^{2} (5.25 sq mi)
- Elevation: 275 m (902 ft)

Population (2025-12-31)
  - Total: 1,177
  - Density: 86.61/km^{2} (224.3/sq mi)
- Time zone: UTC+01:00 (CET)
  - Summer (DST): UTC+02:00 (CEST)
- Postal codes: 31868
- Dialling codes: 05286
- Vehicle registration: HOL
- Website: www.ottensteiner-hochebene.de

Ottenstein is a municipality in the district of Holzminden, in Lower Saxony, Germany.

== See also ==
- Ottenstein Plateau
