= Heinsen =

- Municipality
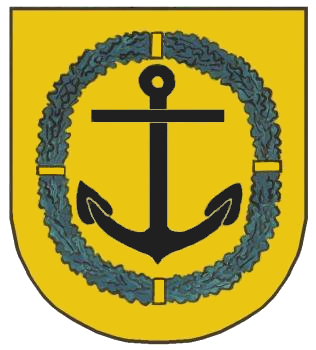
- Coat of arms

- Location of Heinsen within Holzminden district
- Interactive map of Heinsen
- Location within Germany Location within Lower Saxony
- Coordinates: 51°53′N 9°26′E
- Country: Germany
- State: Lower Saxony
- District: Holzminden
- Municipal assoc.: Bodenwerder-Polle

Government
  - Mayor: Gerhard Halling (SPD)

Area
  - Total: 18.63 km^{2} (7.19 sq mi)
- Elevation: 90 m (300 ft)

Population (2025-12-31)
  - Total: 689
  - Density: 37.0/km^{2} (95.8/sq mi)
- Time zone: UTC+01:00 (CET)
  - Summer (DST): UTC+02:00 (CEST)
- Postal codes: 37649
- Dialling codes: 05535
- Vehicle registration: HOL
- Website: www.gemeinde.heinsen-an-der-weser.de

Heinsen is a municipality in the district of Holzminden, in Lower Saxony, Germany.
