= Vahlbruch =

- Municipality
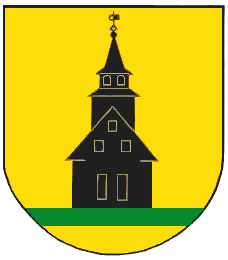
- Coat of arms

- Location of Vahlbruch within Holzminden district
- Interactive map of Vahlbruch
- Location within Germany Location within Lower Saxony
- Coordinates: 51°55′22″N 9°20′30″E
- Country: Germany
- State: Lower Saxony
- District: Holzminden
- Municipal assoc.: Bodenwerder-Polle

Government
  - Mayor: Heinrich Ostermann

Area
  - Total: 14.19 km^{2} (5.48 sq mi)
- Elevation: 276 m (906 ft)

Population (2025-12-31)
  - Total: 368
  - Density: 25.9/km^{2} (67.2/sq mi)
- Time zone: UTC+01:00 (CET)
  - Summer (DST): UTC+02:00 (CEST)
- Postal codes: 37647
- Dialling codes: 05535
- Vehicle registration: HOL
- Website: www.polle-weser.de

Vahlbruch is a municipality in the district of Holzminden, in Lower Saxony, Germany.
