= Hehlen =

- Municipality
- Coat of arms

- Location of Hehlen within Holzminden district
- Interactive map of Hehlen
- Location within Germany Location within Lower Saxony
- Coordinates: 51°59′N 9°29′E
- Country: Germany
- State: Lower Saxony
- District: Holzminden
- Municipal assoc.: Bodenwerder-Polle

Area
  - Total: 21.59 km^{2} (8.34 sq mi)
- Elevation: 124 m (407 ft)

Population (2025-12-31)
  - Total: 1,625
  - Density: 75.27/km^{2} (194.9/sq mi)
- Time zone: UTC+01:00 (CET)
  - Summer (DST): UTC+02:00 (CEST)
- Postal codes: 37619
- Dialling codes: 05533
- Vehicle registration: HOL
- Website: www.hehlen.de

Hehlen is a municipality in the district of Holzminden, in Lower Saxony, Germany.
