= Golmbach =

- Municipality
- Location of Golmbach within Holzminden district
- Interactive map of Golmbach
- Location within Germany Location within Lower Saxony
- Coordinates: 51°54′01″N 9°32′43″E
- Country: Germany
- State: Lower Saxony
- District: Holzminden
- Municipal assoc.: Bevern
- Subdivisions: 2

Government
  - Mayor: Hans-Jörg Hager (SPD)

Area
  - Total: 15.86 km^{2} (6.12 sq mi)
- Elevation: 149 m (489 ft)

Population (2025-12-31)
  - Total: 874
  - Density: 55.1/km^{2} (143/sq mi)
- Time zone: UTC+01:00 (CET)
  - Summer (DST): UTC+02:00 (CEST)
- Postal codes: 37640
- Dialling codes: 05532
- Vehicle registration: HOL
- Website: www.bevern.de

Golmbach is a municipality in the district of Holzminden, in Lower Saxony, Germany.
