= Halle, Holzminden =

Halle
- Municipality
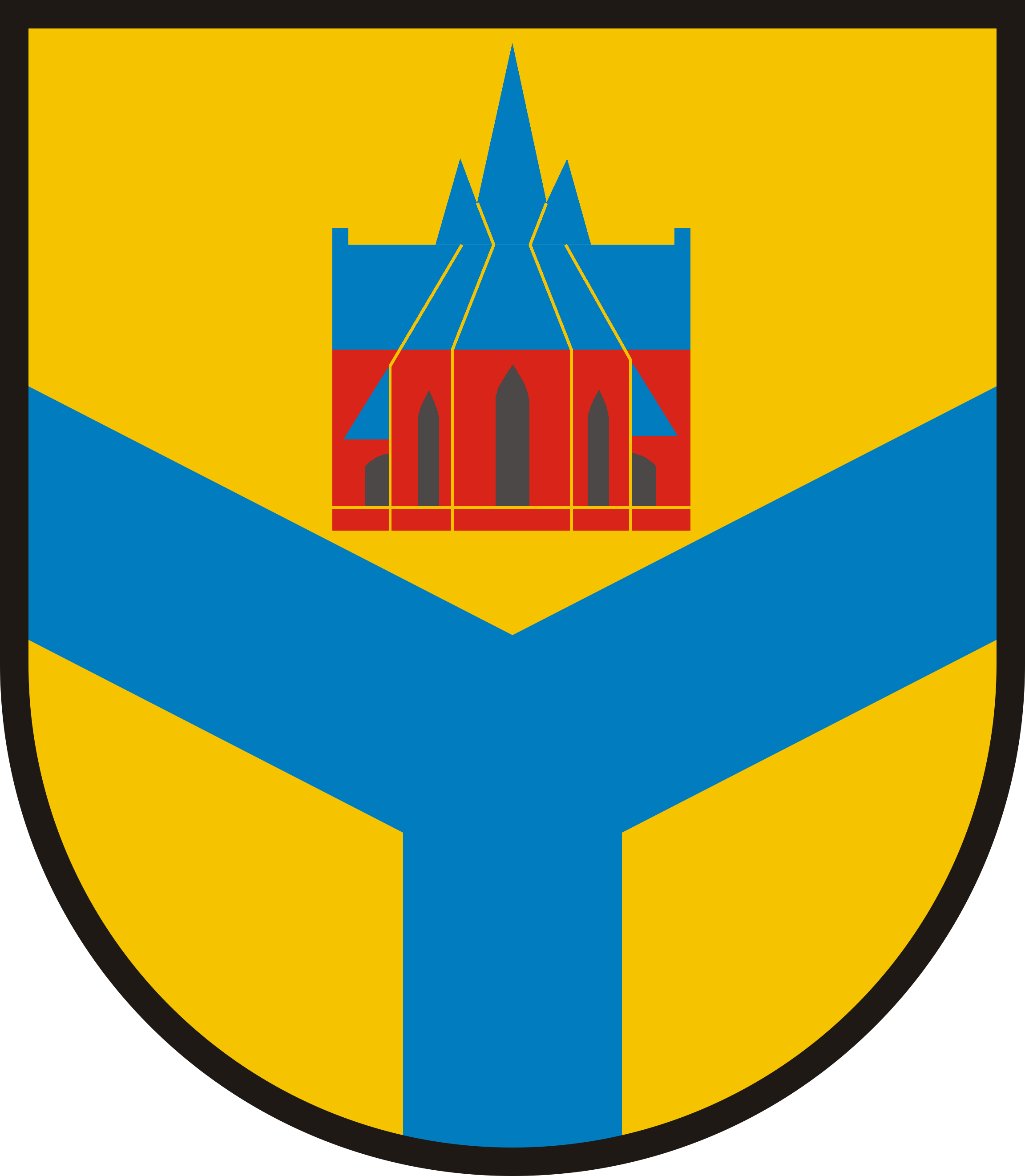
- Coat of arms

- Location of Halle within Holzminden district
- Interactive map of Halle
- Location within Germany Location within Lower Saxony
- Coordinates: 51°59′N 9°34′E
- Country: Germany
- State: Lower Saxony
- District: Holzminden
- Municipal assoc.: Bodenwerder-Polle
- Subdivisions: 7

Government
  - Mayor: Hermann Meyer

Area
  - Total: 28.73 km^{2} (11.09 sq mi)
- Elevation: 129 m (423 ft)

Population (2025-12-31)
  - Total: 1,392
  - Density: 48.45/km^{2} (125.5/sq mi)
- Time zone: UTC+01:00 (CET)
  - Summer (DST): UTC+02:00 (CEST)
- Postal codes: 37620
- Dialling codes: 05533
- Vehicle registration: HOL
- Website: www.halle-weserbergland.de

Halle is a municipality in the district of Holzminden, in Lower Saxony, Germany.
