= Boffzen =

- Municipality
- Flag Coat of arms

- Location of Boffzen within Holzminden district
- Interactive map of Boffzen
- Location within Germany Location within Lower Saxony
- Coordinates: 51°45′N 9°23′E
- Country: Germany
- State: Lower Saxony
- District: Holzminden
- Municipal assoc.: Boffzen

Government
  - Mayor: Horst Menzel (SPD)

Area
  - Total: 8.04 km^{2} (3.10 sq mi)
- Elevation: 121 m (397 ft)

Population (2025-12-31)
  - Total: 2,376
  - Density: 296/km^{2} (765/sq mi)
- Time zone: UTC+01:00 (CET)
  - Summer (DST): UTC+02:00 (CEST)
- Postal codes: 37691
- Dialling codes: 05271
- Vehicle registration: HOL
- Website: www.boffzen.de

Boffzen is a municipality in Holzminden district, Lower Saxony, Germany.

Allocation of seats in the local council electoral period 2001-2006:

- CDU: 4
- SPD: 10
- FDP: 1

Boffzen is also the seat of the Samtgemeinde ("collective municipality") Boffzen.
