= Lauenförde =

- Municipality
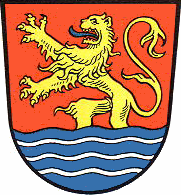
- Coat of arms

- Location of Lauenförde within Holzminden district
- Interactive map of Lauenförde
- Location within Germany Location within Lower Saxony
- Coordinates: 51°39′38″N 9°23′16″E
- Country: Germany
- State: Lower Saxony
- District: Holzminden
- Municipal assoc.: Boffzen
- Subdivisions: 2

Government
  - Mayor: Werner Tyrasa (SPD)

Area
  - Total: 17 km^{2} (6.6 sq mi)
- Elevation: 105 m (344 ft)

Population (2025-12-31)
  - Total: 2,201
  - Density: 130/km^{2} (340/sq mi)
- Time zone: UTC+01:00 (CET)
  - Summer (DST): UTC+02:00 (CEST)
- Postal codes: 37697
- Dialling codes: 05273
- Vehicle registration: HOL

Lauenförde is a municipality in the district of Holzminden, in Lower Saxony, Germany.

The historian Friedrich Uhlhorn (1894–1978) was born in the city.

== Coat of arms ==
The arms were granted in 1927 and based on a seal of the Amt Lauenförde from 1779. The lion is the so-called Welfen-lion, indicating that the town belonged to this family. The waves symbolise the Weser. Lauenförde is situated on the Weser and used to be one of the major crossing points of this river. It has also been stated that the arms are canting, derived from Löwenfurt (Lion-ford).
