= Bodenwerder =

- Town
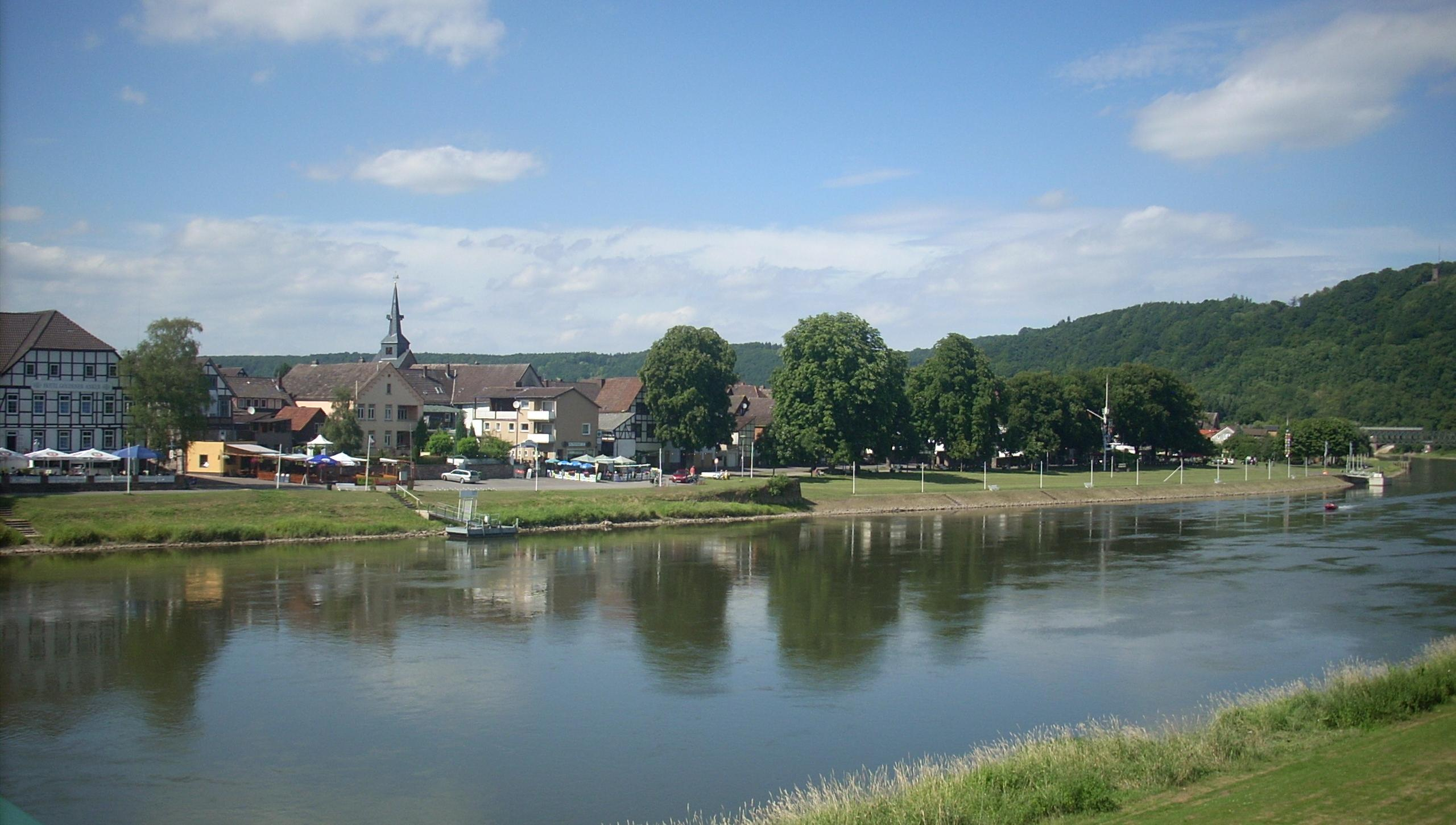

- Coat of arms

- Location of Bodenwerder within Holzminden district
- Interactive map of Bodenwerder
- Location within Germany Location within Lower Saxony
- Coordinates: 51°58′N 9°31′E
- Country: Germany
- State: Lower Saxony
- District: Holzminden
- Municipal assoc.: Bodenwerder-Polle

Government
  - Mayor: Friedrich-Wilhelm Schmidt (CDU)

Area
  - Total: 29.05 km^{2} (11.22 sq mi)
- Elevation: 76 m (249 ft)

Population (2025-12-31)
  - Total: 4,631
  - Density: 159.4/km^{2} (412.9/sq mi)
- Time zone: UTC+01:00 (CET)
  - Summer (DST): UTC+02:00 (CEST)
- Postal codes: 37619
- Dialling codes: 05533
- Vehicle registration: HOL
- Website: www.bodenwerder.de

The Münchhausenstadt Bodenwerder (German pronunciation: [boːdn̩ˈvɛʁdɐ]) is a town in Holzminden district, Lower Saxony, Germany. It lies on the river Weser and is best known as the birthplace and residence of Baron von Münchhausen.

== Geography ==
Bodenwerder is located in the Holzminden district, Lower Saxony, Germany. It lies on the river Weser, upstream from Hamelin, at a point where the river has carved a gap in the hills.

== History ==
The settlement was first granted the status of a town in 1287 by Ritter Heinrich II von Homburg. There was already an important bridge over the river here in 1289, which connected Hameln-Paderborn to Einbeck-Frankfurt. Around 1340 one of the Homburg Bodos was Lord of the Manor and originated a planned town with walls and towers. From him derives the town's name, which means "Bodo's Eyot".

In 1750, Baron von Münchhausen, who was born in Bodenwerder, retired to his estate here and told his famous stories to his friends. He died in 1797 and is buried here. His house was acquired by the town in 1935 and was used as the town hall; a room containing a Münchhausen museum was added.

== Transportation ==
Train services were suspended in 1982.

== Arts and culture ==
The Münchhausen prize for entertainment is awarded in May each year.

== Attractions ==
The Münchhausen museum and monument as well as his grave in the monastery church of Kloster Kemnade are notable tourist attractions. There is also a Gothic church, Stadtkirche Sankt Nikolai. The town is surrounded by the remains of medieval fortifications.

== Government ==
Bodenwerder is also the seat of the Samtgemeinde ("collective municipality") Bodenwerder-Polle.

== Notable people ==
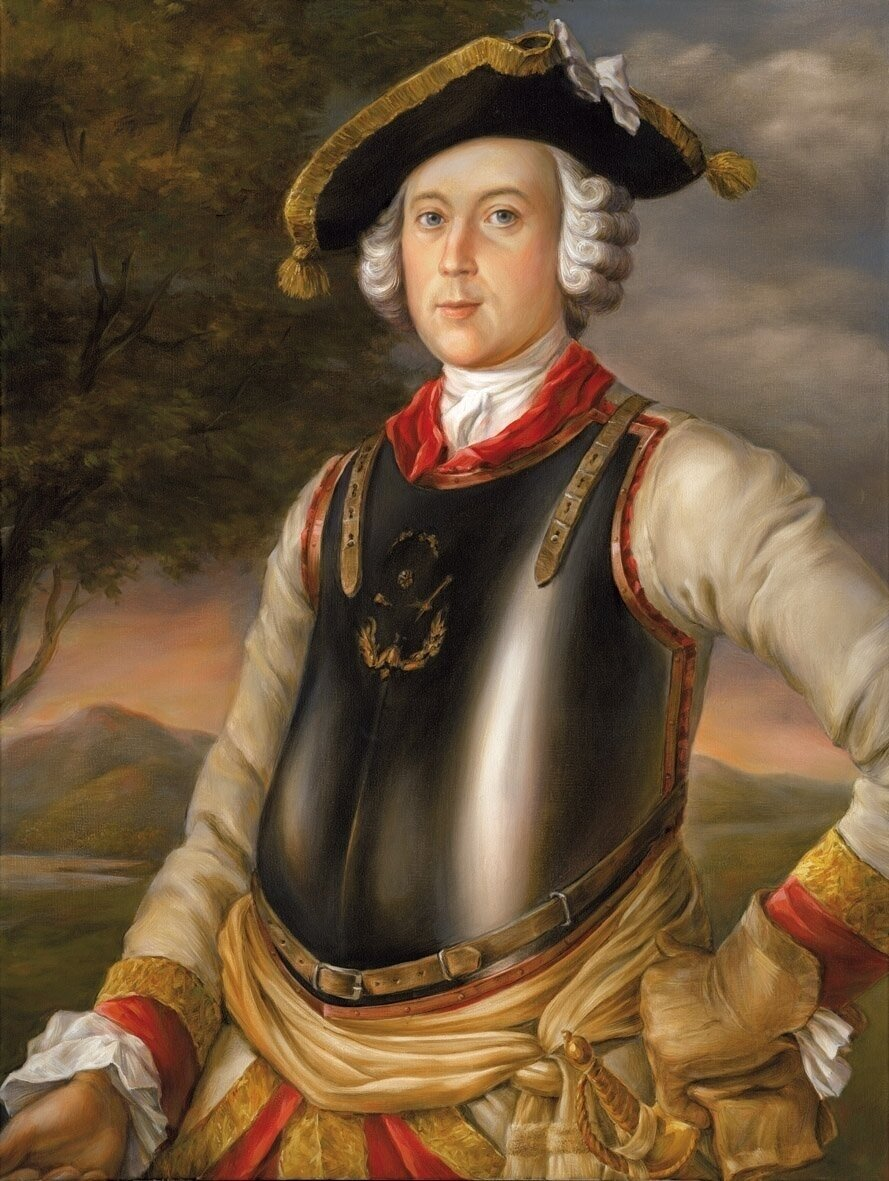
Karl Friedrich Hieronymus, Münchhausen 1752

- Jonatan Briel, (1942–1988), writer, film director and screenwriter, founded the Jugendfilmstudio Holzminden in 1962 (Youth film studio)
- Karl Friedrich Hieronymus, Freiherr von Münchhausen (1720–1797), known as Baron Münchhausen
