= Holzminden =

- Town
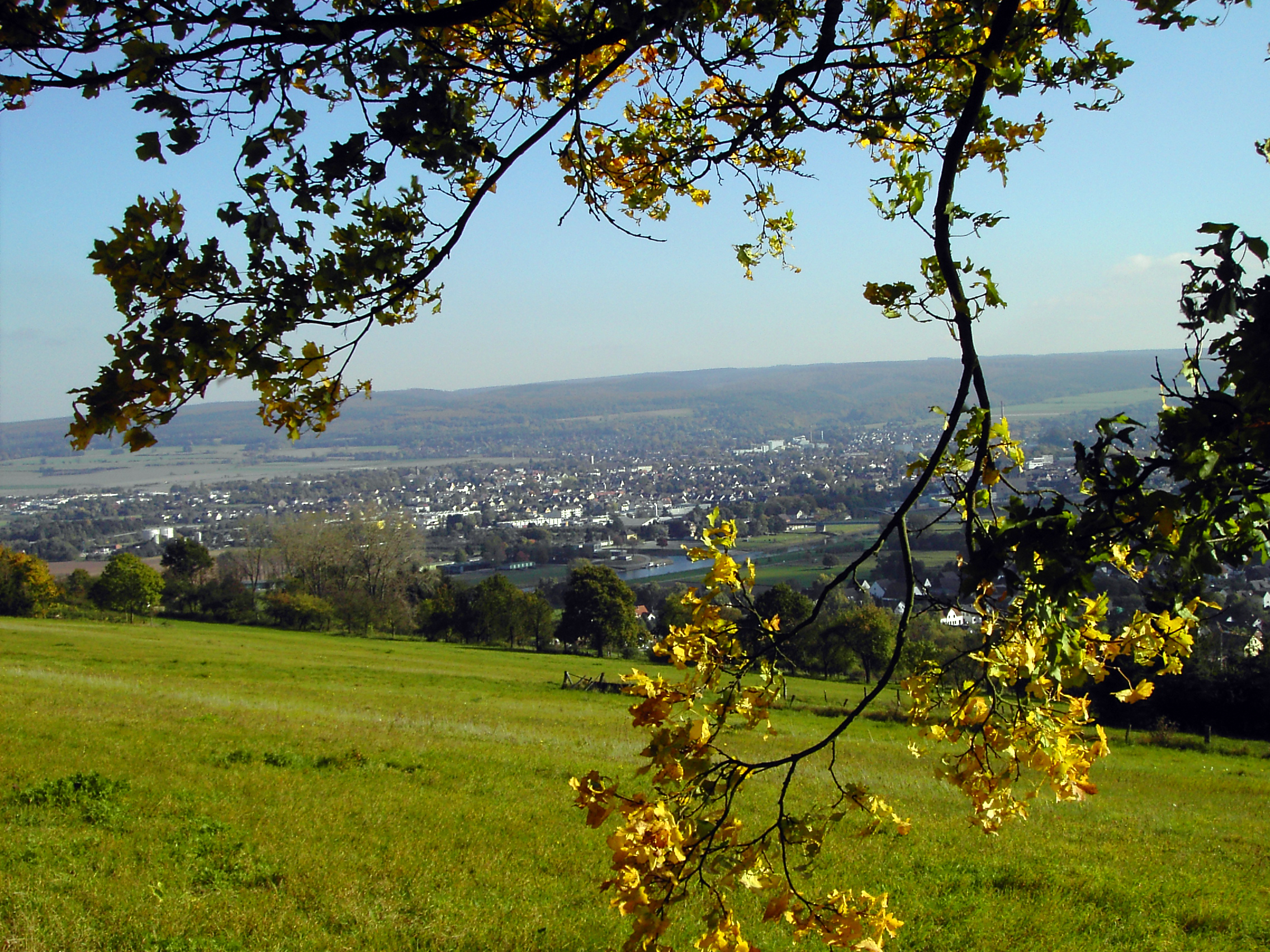
- A view over the town in autumn

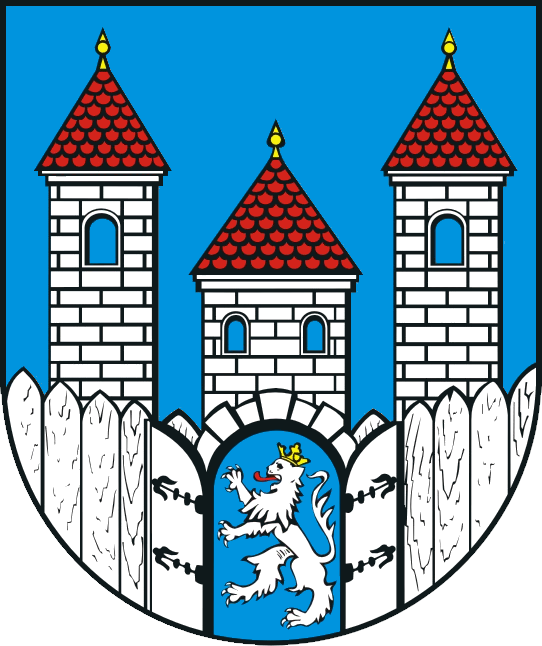
- Flag Coat of arms

- Location of Holzminden within Holzminden district
- Interactive map of Holzminden
- Location within Germany Location within Lower Saxony
- Coordinates: 51°49′47″N 09°26′54″E
- Country: Germany
- State: Lower Saxony
- District: Holzminden

Government
  - Mayor (2021–26): Christian Belke

Area
  - Total: 88.25 km^{2} (34.07 sq mi)
- Elevation: 89 m (292 ft)

Population (2025-12-31)
  - Total: 18,921
  - Density: 214.4/km^{2} (555.3/sq mi)
- Time zone: UTC+01:00 (CET)
  - Summer (DST): UTC+02:00 (CEST)
- Postal codes: 37603
- Dialling codes: 05531
- Website: www.holzminden.de

Holzminden (German pronunciation: [hɔltsˈmɪndn̩]; Low German: Holtsminne) is a town in southern Lower Saxony, Germany. It is the capital of the district of Holzminden. It is located on the river Weser, which at this point forms the border with the state of North Rhine-Westphalia.

== History ==
Holzminden is first mentioned in the 9th century as Holtesmeni. However, the name did not at this time refer to the present city, but to the village of Altendorf, the "old village", which was incorporated into the city in 1922.

During the reign of Louis the Pious (814–840), monks from the Abbey of Corbie in France came to this part of Germany and founded a daughter house at Hethis in the Solling. It was later abandoned due to lack of access to water, and a new monastery, Corbeia nova (Corvey Abbey), opened close to the river.

The settlement is believed to have come into being in the 6th-7th centuries, along with other settlements in the vicinity. As Holzminden was granted municipal liberties, allowing greater privileges to its inhabitants and attracting new settlers from the surrounding hinterland, other villages were subsequently abandoned.

In 1200, the town was brought under the protection of the prince's castle of Everstein, and by 1245 it had received a charter, which was granted by the count of Everstein. The town's coat of arms shows the Everstein lion rampant within the open town gate.

From 1408, the town belonged to the Welfen princes; and from the 16th century to the princes of Brunswick of the Wolfenbüttel line. From the 16th century until 1942, Holzminden therefore laid within Brunswick-Lüneburg.

In 1640, during the Thirty Years' War, the town was destroyed by the Imperial troops. Until the 20th century, Holzminden remained a provincial town of small farmers and holdings.

During World War I, Holzminden was the site of a civilian internment camp on the outskirts of the town, which held up to 10,000 Russian, Belgian and French nationals, including women and children (1914–1918); and also of a smaller prisoner-of-war camp for 500–600 captured British and British Empire officers (1917–1918).

== Economy ==
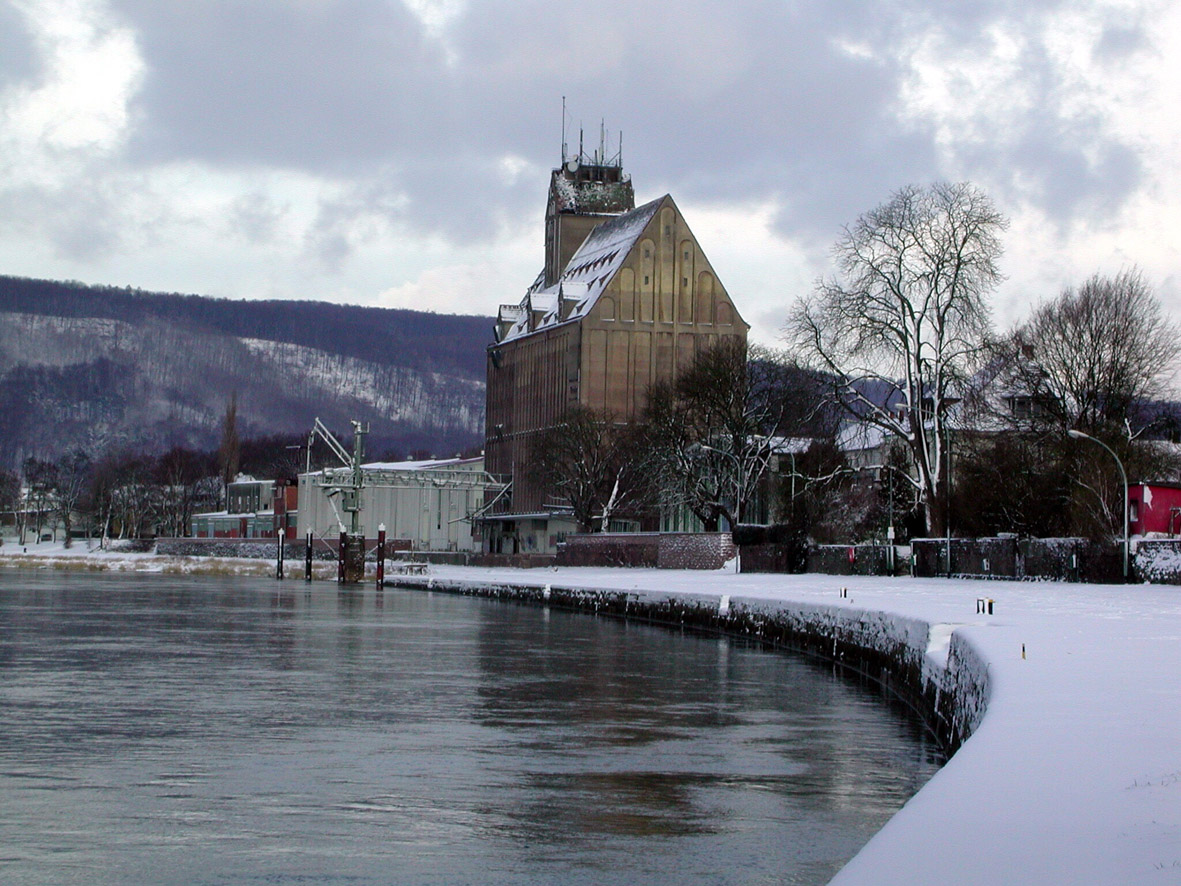
The Weserkai and the large granary

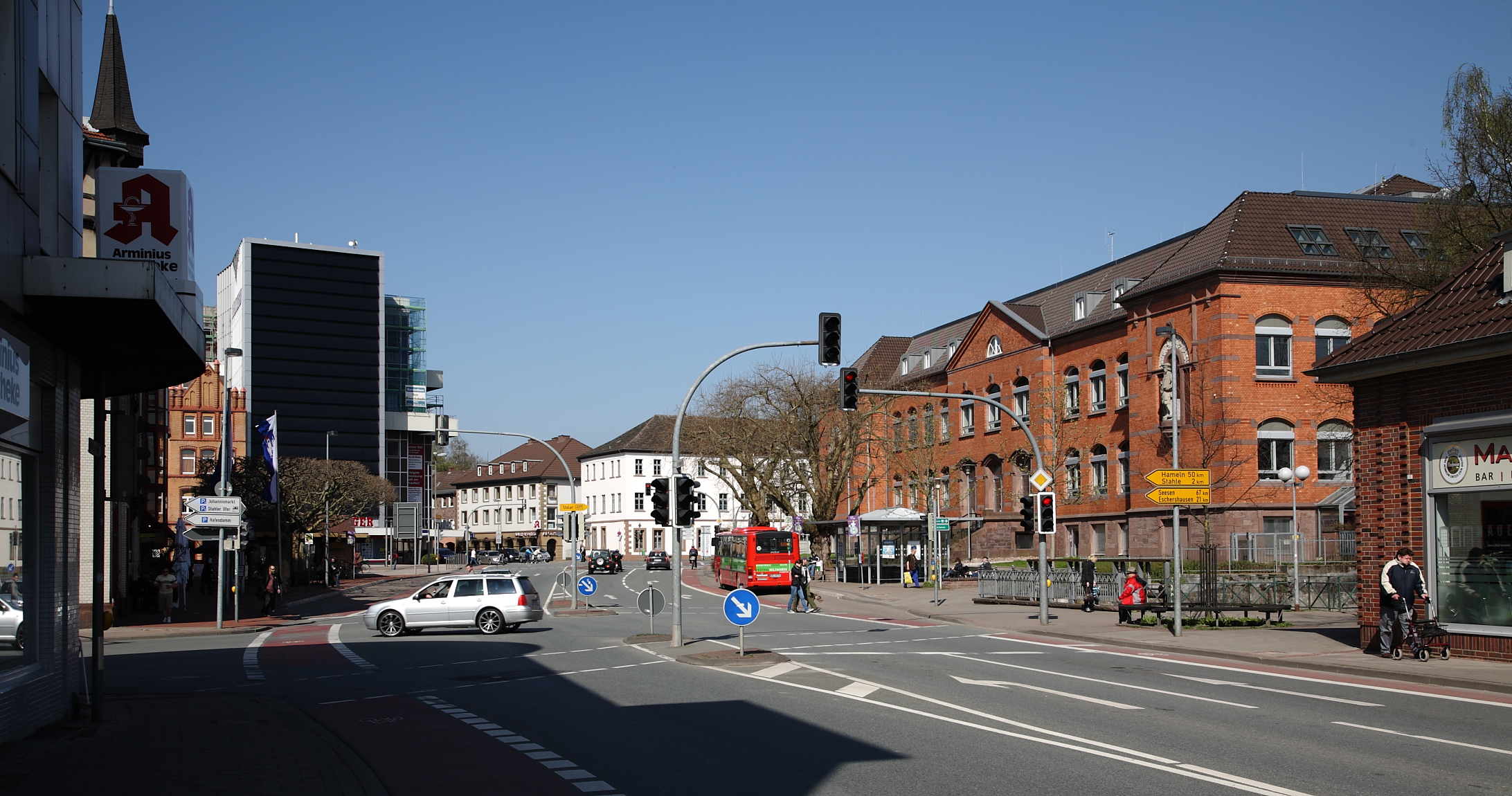
Fürstenberger Strasse, looking towards Haarmannplatz (Haarmann Square, named after the district building master Friedrich Ludwig Haarmann); with, on the right, the Hochschule für angewandte Wissenschaft und Kunst (HAWK)

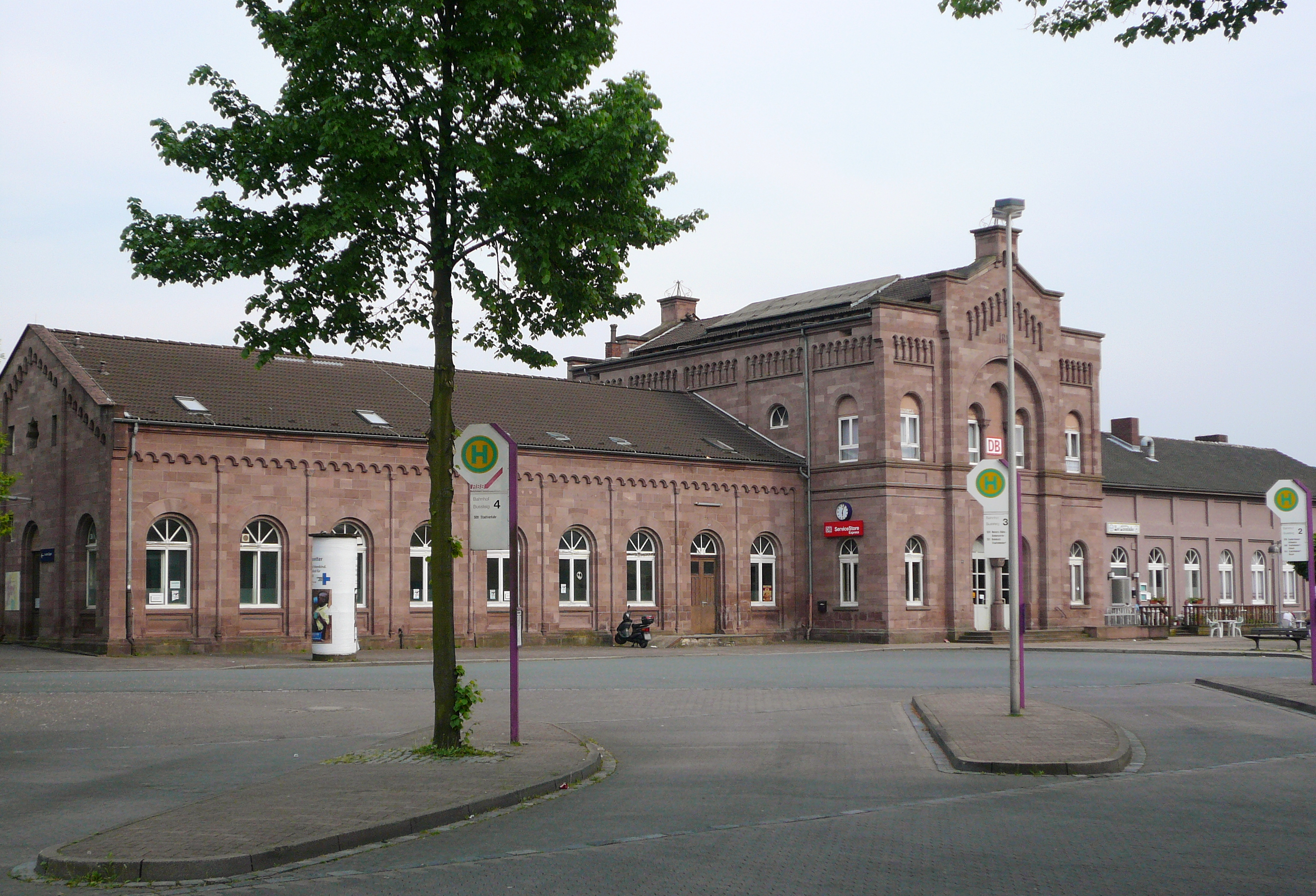
Railway station

Holzminden's current main source of income are industrial services, and were historically farming and craftsmanship.

In the late 19th century, chemist Dr. Wilhelm Haarmann began making developments in the local scent and flavours industry, and succeeded in synthesising vanillin from coniferyl alcohol alongside Ferdinand Tiemann in 1874. More products were subsequently developed. The modern successor of their enterprise is Symrise, a major producer of flavours and fragrances.

The Stiebel Eltron company, which produces heating and hot water products, has its headquarters in Holzminden.

Owens-Illinois operates a glassworks in the town.

== Religion ==
As a part of the former territory of Brunswick, Holzminden maintains a Protestant tradition. The church of St. Pauls in Altendorf, dating from before 1200, is the oldest of the town's churches. Other churches in the town are named after Luther, St. Michael, St. Thomas and St. Joseph(catholic).

== Sights ==
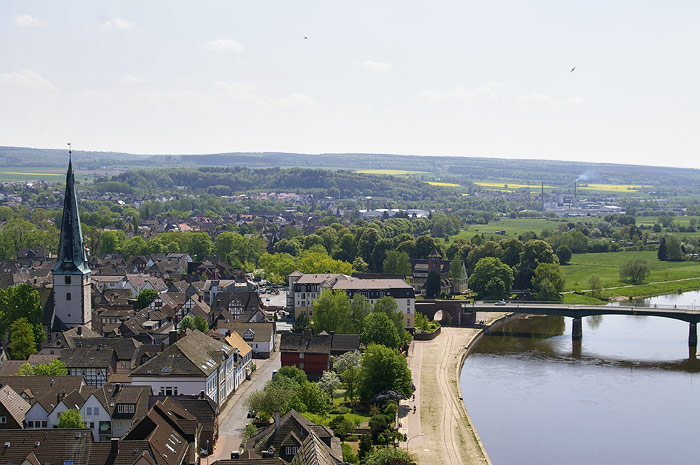
The old part of the town and the river Weser

The Tilly House of 1609 is located on Johannis Square. Johann Tserclaes, Count of Tilly, commander of the Imperial forces during the Thirty Years' War, is said to have spent a night here.

The Reichspräsidentenhaus links the old part of the town with the Hafendamm and was opened in 1929.

The steeple of the Lutheran church is a well-known landmark in Holzminden. The interior was remodelled in 1577, when it was made into a two-room church.

The Severinsche Haus is a decorated house dating from 1683. It is the largest of the bourgeois houses, is decorated with a weathercock, and is known for its slanting floors.

== Educational institutions ==
- HAWK, the Hochschule für angewandte Wissenschaft und Kunst, was founded in 1831/32 by Friedrich Ludwig Haarmann as the first college of architecture in Germany. The Bauschule is a prominent feature of the town, and many student activities, such as the traditional master's procession, are regular events on the town's calendar.
- LSH, the Internat Solling, is a private boarding school founded in 1909 as part of an educational reform movement. The campus occupies large open grounds on a western slope of the Solling.
- Secondary schools include the Campe-Gymnasium, the Dr. Jasper-Realschule and the Johannes-Falk-Schule (Hauptschule). There is also a Förderschule, Schule an der Weser and Anne-Frank-Schule.

== International relations ==
Holzminden is twinned with:

- Leven, Fife, Scotland

== Notable people ==
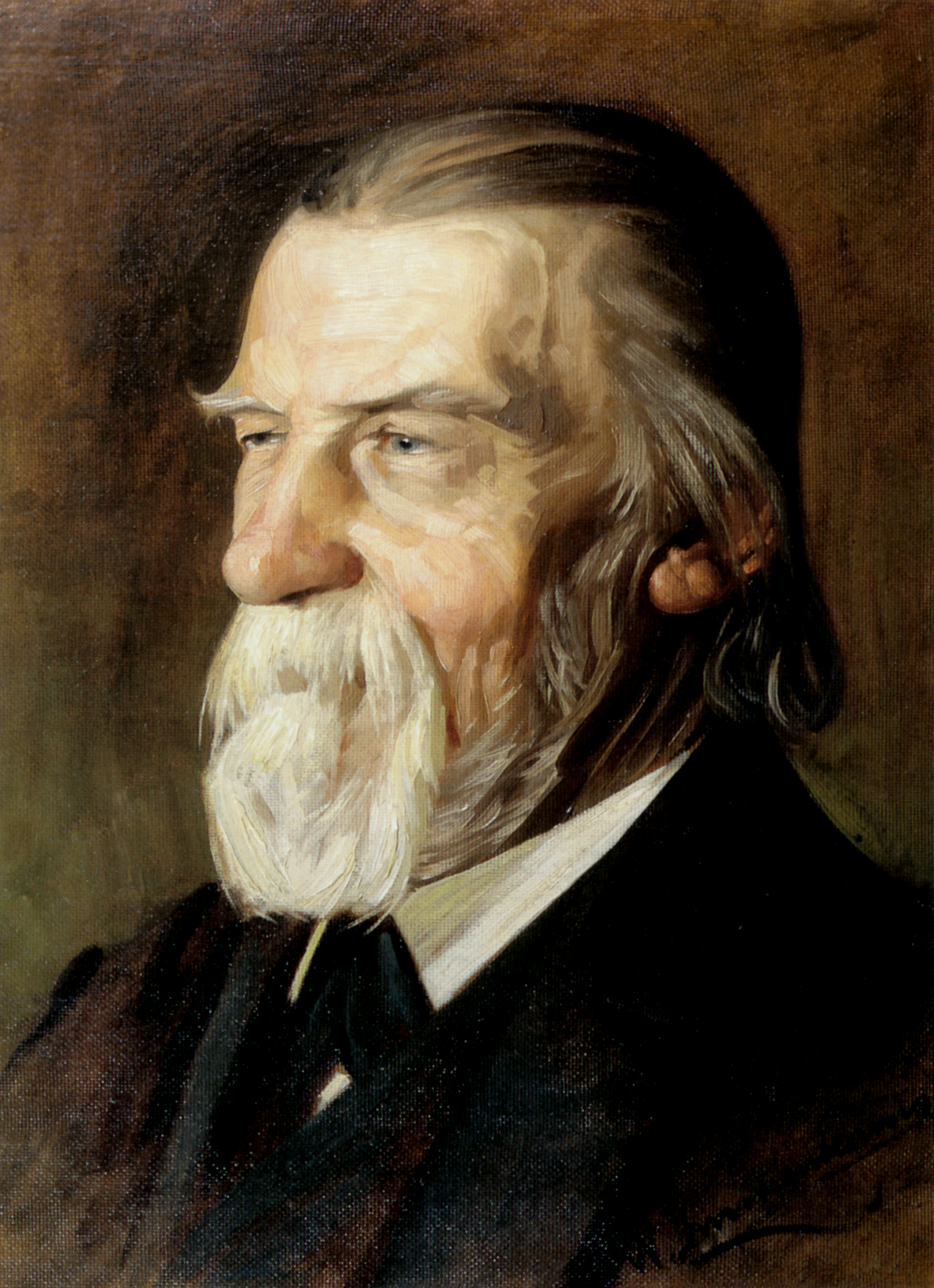
Wilhelm Raabe, 1911

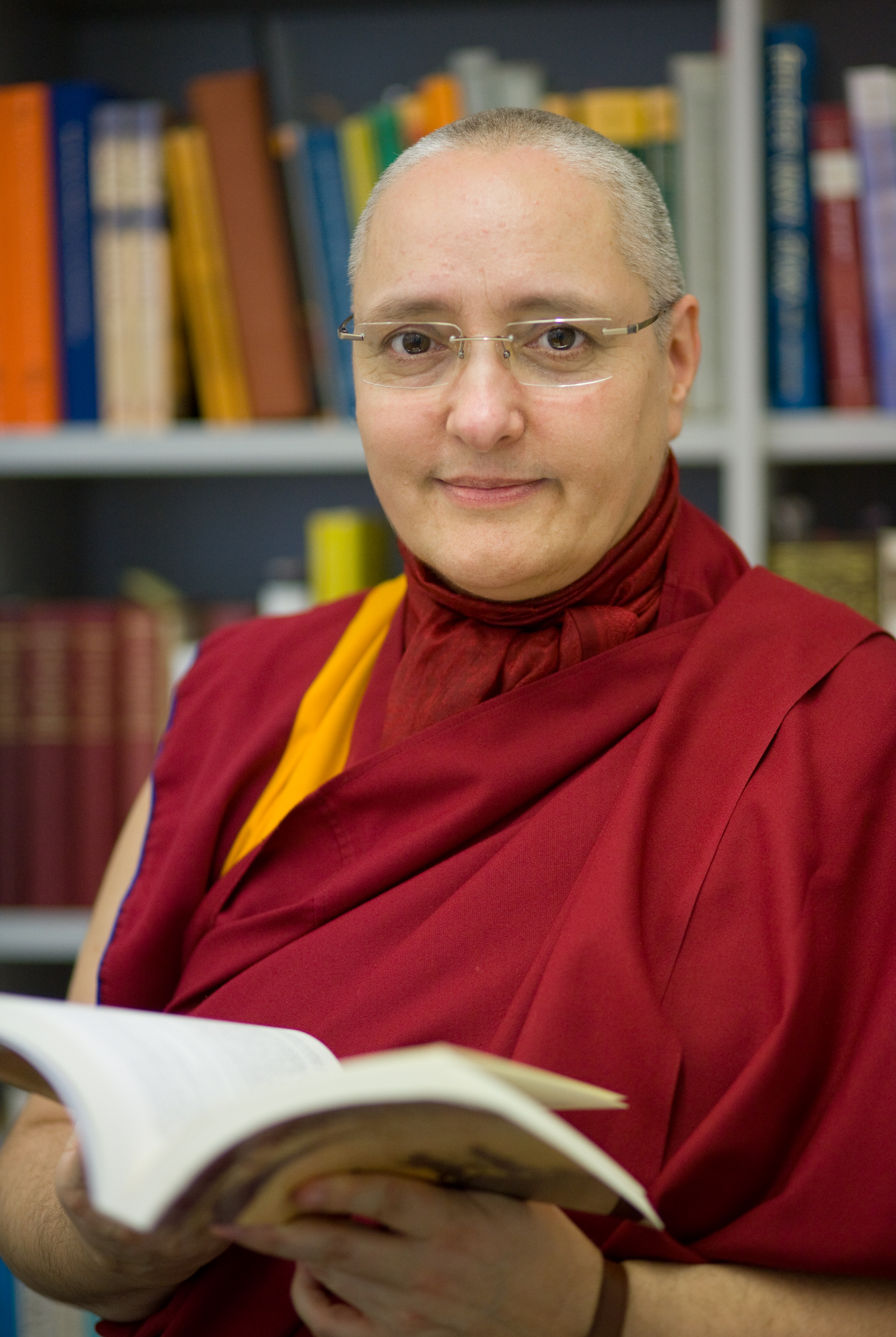
Carola Roloff, 2010

- Heinrich Grimm (ca1592-1637), a late-Renaissance / early-Baroque German composer, cantor and organist.
- Robert Bunsen (1811–1899), chemist, developed the Bunsen burner; went to school locally
- Wilhelm Konrad Hermann Müller (1812–1890), a philologist of Germanic studies
- Wilhelm Raabe (1831–1910), novelist, born in nearby Eschershausen
- August Hampe (1866–1945), politician, Minister of Justice of the Braunschweig District
- Erwin Böhme (1879–1917), World War I flying ace
- Nikolaus von Falkenhorst (1885–1968), Generaloberst, occupied Norway, 1940/1944, convicted war criminal; died locally
- Carl-Wilhelm Gerberding (1894–1984), industrialist and founder of Dragoco
- Adolf Heusinger (1897–1982), German general and Chairman of the NATO Military Committee
- Wilhelm Karl Prinz von Preussen (1922–2007), Prince of Prussia, died locally
- Niels Jannasch (1924–2001), mariner, curator and founding director of the Maritime Museum of the Atlantic
- Eberhard Itzenplitz (1926–2012), film director
- Ulrich Brinkhoff (born 1940), photographer and writer
- Jonatan Briel (1942–1988), film director and actor
- Carola Roloff (born 1959), Buddhist nun, Tibetologist, University Professor
- Uwe Schünemann (born 1964), CDU politician and Minister of Lower Saxony
- Christian Meyer (born 1975), politician for the Alliance '90/The Greens and Minister of Lower Saxony

=== Sports ===
- Jyhan Artut (born 1976), darts player
- Nicolas Kiefer (born 1977), tennis player
- Annika Roloff (born 1991), athlete who specializes in the pole vault

== See also ==
- Holzminden internment camp
- Holzminden prisoner-of-war camp
- Holzminden (district)
- Metropolitan region Hannover-Braunschweig-Göttingen-Wolfsburg
