= Holzminden (district) =

District in Lower Saxony, Germany

Coordinates: 51°50′N 9°30′E

- District
- Flag Coat of arms
- Country: Germany
- State: Lower Saxony
- Capital: Holzminden

Government
  - District admin.: Michael Schünemann

Area
  - Total: 692 km^{2} (267 sq mi)

Population (31 December 2023)
  - Total: 66,088
  - Density: 96/km^{2} (250/sq mi)
- Time zone: UTC+01:00 (CET)
  - Summer (DST): UTC+02:00 (CEST)
- Vehicle registration: HOL
- Website: landkreis-holzminden.de

Holzminden (German pronunciation: [hɔltsˈmɪndn̩]) is a district in Lower Saxony, Germany, with the town of Holzminden as its administrative capital. It is bounded by (from the north and clockwise) the districts of Hamelin-Pyrmont, Hildesheim and Northeim, and by the state of North Rhine-Westphalia (districts of Höxter and Lippe).

== History ==
The district was established in 1833 within the Duchy of Brunswick-Lüneburg. It was moved to the Prussian Province of Hanover as part of a territorial exchange in 1942. The last territorial modification was in 1974.

== Geography ==
The district is located in the Weserbergland mountains, roughly between Hamelin and Göttingen. The Weser River forms the southwestern border of the district and runs through its northern parts.

== Coat of arms ==
The lion is taken from the arms of the County of Everstein; the counts ruled over the region in the 14th century and were the founders of the City of Holzminden. The bar in the bottom is symbolising the Weser River.

== Towns and municipalities ==
Clickable map of towns and municipalities in the district

Towns	Samtgemeinden
1. Holzminden; Free municipalities: 1. Delligsen	1. Bevern; 1. Bevern^{1}; 2. Golmbach; 3. Holenberg; 4. Negenborn; 2. Bodenwerder-Polle; 1. Bodenwerder^{1, 2}; 2. Brevörde; 3. Halle; 4. Hehlen; 5. Heinsen; 6. Heyen; 7. Kirchbrak; 8. Ottenstein; 9. Pegestorf; 10. Polle; 11. Vahlbruch	3. Boffzen; 1. Boffzen^{1}; 2. Derental; 3. Fürstenberg; 4. Lauenförde; 4. Eschershausen-Stadtoldendorf; 1. Arholzen; 2. Deensen; 3. Dielmissen; 4. Eimen; 5. Eschershausen^{2}; 6. Heinade; 7. Holzen; 8. Lenne; 9. Lüerdissen; 10. Stadtoldendorf^{1, 2}; 11. Wangelnstedt
	^{1}seat of the Samtgemeinde; ^{2}town

== Partner regions ==
- Głubczyce County, Poland

== See also ==
- Metropolitan region Hannover-Braunschweig-Göttingen-Wolfsburg
