= Stadtoldendorf (Samtgemeinde) =

English

Coordinates: 51°53′N 9°37′E

Stadtoldendorf was a Samtgemeinde ("collective municipality") in the district of Holzminden, in Lower Saxony, Germany. Its seat was in the town Stadtoldendorf. On 1 January 2011, it merged with the former Samtgemeinde Eschershausen to form the new Samtgemeinde Eschershausen-Stadtoldendorf.

The Samtgemeinde Stadtoldendorf consisted of the following municipalities:

1. Arholzen
2. Deensen
3. Heinade
4. Lenne
5. Stadtoldendorf
6. Wangelnstedt
