= Holzberg =

Range of hills in Germany

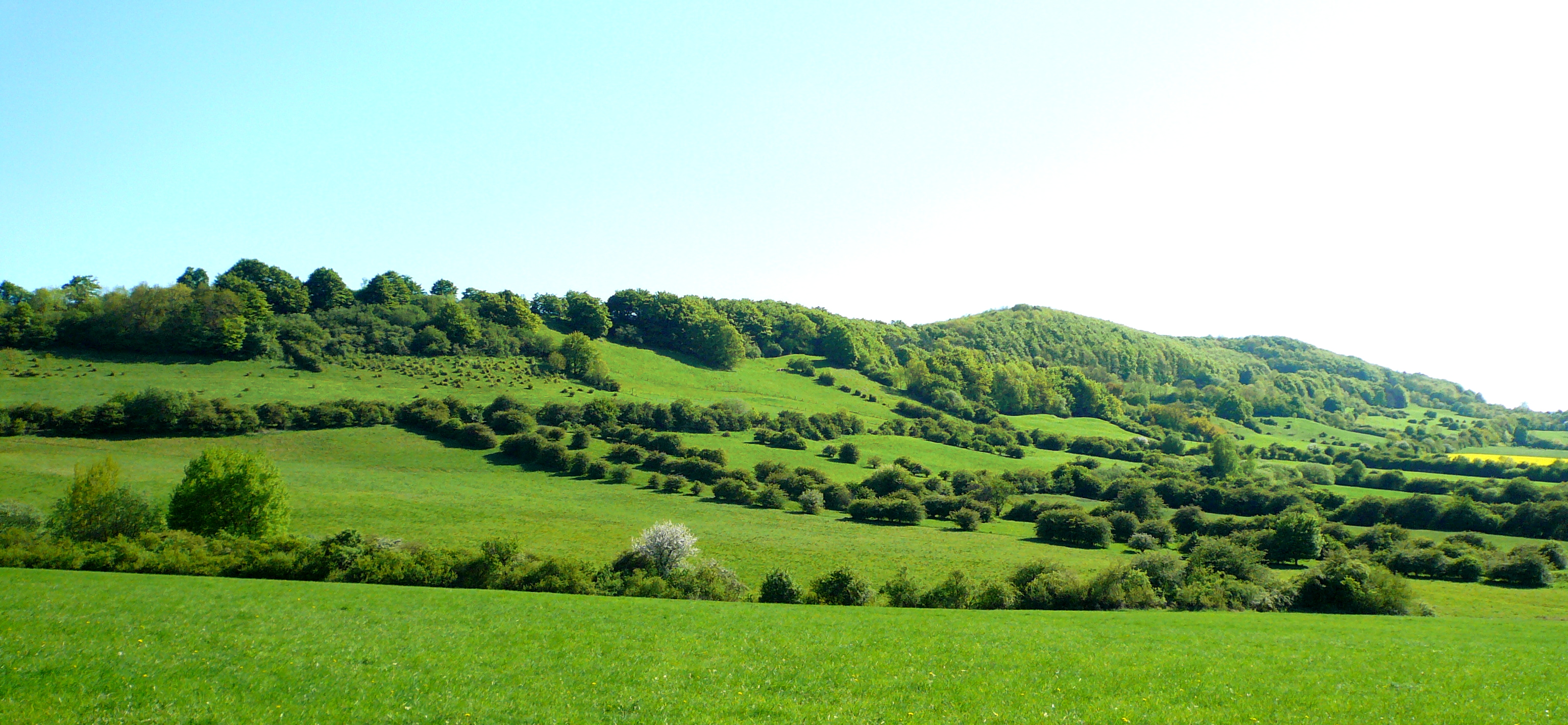
- The Holzberg ridge seen from the north

Highest point
- Peak: Holzberg
- Elevation: 444.5 m above NHN
- Coordinates: 51°51′N 9°38.5′E

Geography
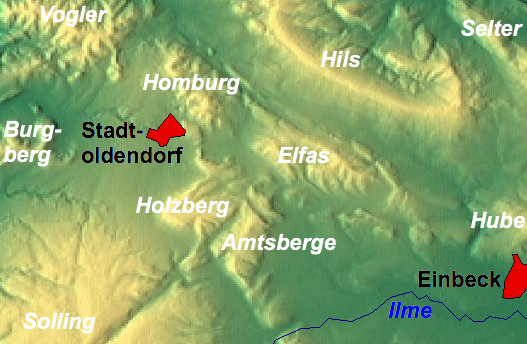
- The Holzberg and its neighbouring ranges near Stadtoldendorf
- Country: Germany
- State: Lower Saxony
- District: Holzminden
- Town: Stadtoldendorf
- Parent range: Lower Saxon Hills and Weser Uplands

Geology
- Rock age(s): Muschelkalk, bunter sandstone
- Rock type(s): Limestone, sandstone

The Holzberg (German pronunciation: [ˈhɔlt͡sˌbɛʁk]) is a small range of hills up to 444.5 m above sea level (NHN) in south Lower Saxony, Germany.

== Geography ==
The forested ridge of the Holzberg is located in the district of Holzminden at the junction of the Leine Uplands in the east and the Weser Uplands in the west. It lies northeast of the Solling between Stadtoldendorf and the Homburg Forest to the north, the Elfas to the northeast, the Amtsberge to the east, from which it is separate by the small valley of the Teichbach, and Dassel to the southeast. The eastern part of the Holzberg is called the Denkiehausen Forest (Denkiehäuser Wald)

Several streams rise on the Holzberg ridge that, sooner or later, become tributaries of the Leine and Weser. Its northern foothills are drained by the Lenne (an eastern tributary of the Weser) which rises in the area and flows northwest; its eastern slopes by the Teichbach (northern tributary of the Spüligbach); its southern foothills by the upper course of the Spüligbach (northwestern tributary of the Ilme) and its western slopes by the Eberbach (southwestern source stream of the Forstbach).

=== Natural regions ===
The Holzberg, together with the Amtsberge hills to the southeast and the Ellensen Forest which lies beyond it, belong to the natural region known as Amtsberge (371.04) within the sub-unit of the Northern Solling Foreland (371.0) in the major unit of the Solling Foreland (371) and in the major unit group of the Weser-Leine Uplands (No. 37). The land transitions to the northwest into the natural region of the Stadtoldendorf Plateau (Stadtoldendorfer Hochfläche) (371.02) and to the northeast into the Elfas Hinterland (Elfasumland) (371.06). To the southwest is the subunit of the Northern Solling (370.0) within the major unit of Solling, Bramwald and Reinhardswald (370).

== Hills ==
The highest elevations on the Holzberg ridge include (in metres above NN):

- Holzberg (444.5 m) – on the southern rocky slopes of the Holzberg
- Unnamed peak (441.3 m) – south of the (western) crags (Klippen)
- Unnamed peak (405.4 m) – south of the (western) crags
- Unnamed peak (436.0 m) – in the central Holzberg
- Unnamed peak (397.0 m) – northeast of the (western) crags

== Streams ==
The streams of the Holzberg include the:

- Eberbach (southwest source stream of the Forstbach)
- Lenne (eastern tributary of the Weser; rises on the northern edge of the Holzberg)
- Spüligbach (northwestern tributary of the Ilme; rises on the southern edge of the Holzberg)
- Teichbach (northern tributary of the Spüligbach)

== Towns and villages ==
- Dassel - to the southeast
- Deensen - to the west
- Heinade - to the south
- Stadtoldendorf - to the north
- Wangelnstedt - to the northeast
