= Amtsberge =

Hill range in Germany

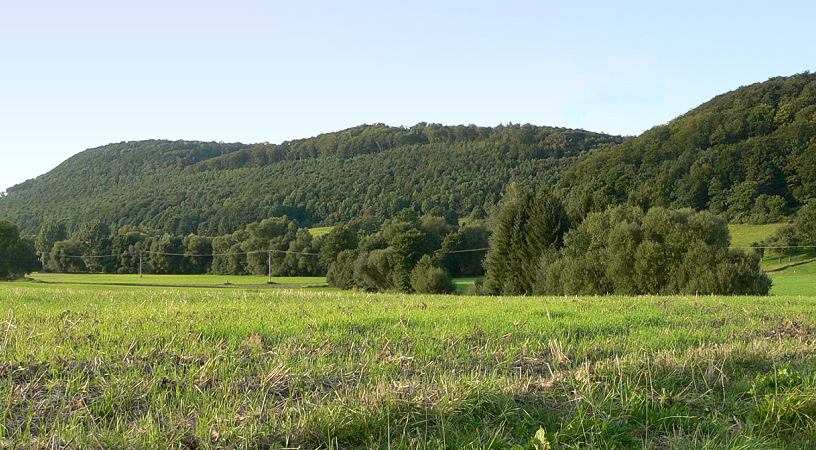
- Part of the Amtsberge; the central summit is the site of the Hunnesrück ruins (view from Dassel)

Highest point
- Peak: Belzer Berg
- Elevation: 392.2 m above NN

Geography
- Location within Lower Saxony
- Country: Germany
- State: Lower Saxony
- Range coordinates: 51°50′N 9°41′E
- Parent range: Leine Uplands, Weser Uplands

Geology
- Rock age(s): muschelkalk, keuper
- Rock type(s): limestone, marl, sandstone

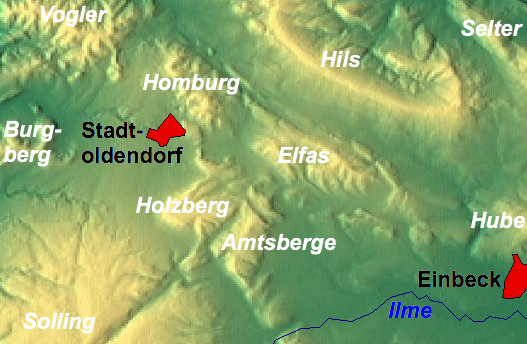
The Amtsberge between Stadtoldendorf and Einbeck

The Amtsberge are a small ridge of hills, up to 392.2 m above sea level (NN), near Dassel in southern Lower Saxony in Germany.

== Geography ==
The densely wooded ridge of the Amtsberge is located on the boundary between the districts of Northeim (which is home to the larger part of the Amtsberge) and Holzminden (which contains the northwestern portion of the Amtsberge) and also on the boundary between the Leine Uplands to the east and the Weser Uplands to the west. It lies northeast of the Solling range between Stadtoldendorf in the northwest, the Homburg Forest in the north-northwest, the Elfas to the north-northeast, Dassel to the south and the ridge of Holzberg to the west, from which it is only separated by the little valley of the Teichbach stream.

Several streams rise within the Amtsberge that are tributaries of the rivers Weser and Leine. The northwestern foothills of the Amtsberge are passed by the upper reaches of the River Lenne (an eastern tributary of the Weser) flowing northwest. The southern end of the hills is passed by the middle reaches of the Spüligbach (northwestern tributary of the Ilme) heading southeast. To the east are the middle reaches of the Bewer.

=== Hills ===
Amongst the hills of the Amtsberge are the following − sorted by height in metres above sea level (NN):

- Belzer Berg (392.2 m) *
- Hatop (370.4 m)
- Teichklippe (up to 350 m)
- Wendeberg (343.6 m)
- Heimkenberg (320.4 m)
- Hill crowned by Hunnesrück castle ruins (317.0 m)
- Rothenberg (270 m)

* a trigonometric point (at 375.6 m) lies on the northwest slope of the Belzer Berg

=== Streams and rivers ===
Amongst the streams and rivers in and around the Amtsberge are the:

- Bewer (northwestern tributary of the Ilme)
- Lenne (eastern tributary of the Weser)
- Reißbach (western tributary of the Bewer)
- Spüligbach (northwestern tributary of the Ilme)
- Teichbach (northern tributary of the Spüligbach)

=== Places ===
Places in and on the Amtsberge:

- Dassel – to the south
- Heinade – to the west
- Stadtoldendorf – to the northwest
- Wangelnstedt – to the north

== Places of interest ==
Apart from the charm of its woods, the places of interest in the Amtsberge include the Teichklippe crags, that are located on the ridge between Mackensen and Denkiehausen, and the ruins of Hunnesrück Castle, that lie south of the ridge north of Dassel and between Mackensen and Hunnesrück.
