= Eschershausen (Samtgemeinde) =

Former collective municipality in the district of Holzminden, in Lower Saxony, Germany

- Samtgemeinde (collective municipality)
- Location within Germany
- Coordinates: 51.917°N 9.650°E
- Country: Germany
- State: Lower Saxony
- District: Holzminden
- Seat: Eschershausen

Government
  - Type: Collective municipality
- Time zone: UTC+1 (CET)
  - Summer (DST): UTC+2 (CEST)
- Postal code: 37632
- Area code: 05534
- ISO 3166 code: DE-NI

Eschershausen was a Samtgemeinde ("collective municipality") in the district of Holzminden, in Lower Saxony, Germany. Its seat was in the town Eschershausen. On 1 January 2011, it merged with the former Samtgemeinde Stadtoldendorf to form the new Samtgemeinde Eschershausen-Stadtoldendorf.

The Samtgemeinde Eschershausen consisted of the following municipalities:

1. Dielmissen
2. Eimen
3. Eschershausen
4. Holzen
5. Lüerdissen
