= Helle (Spüligbach) =

River in Germany

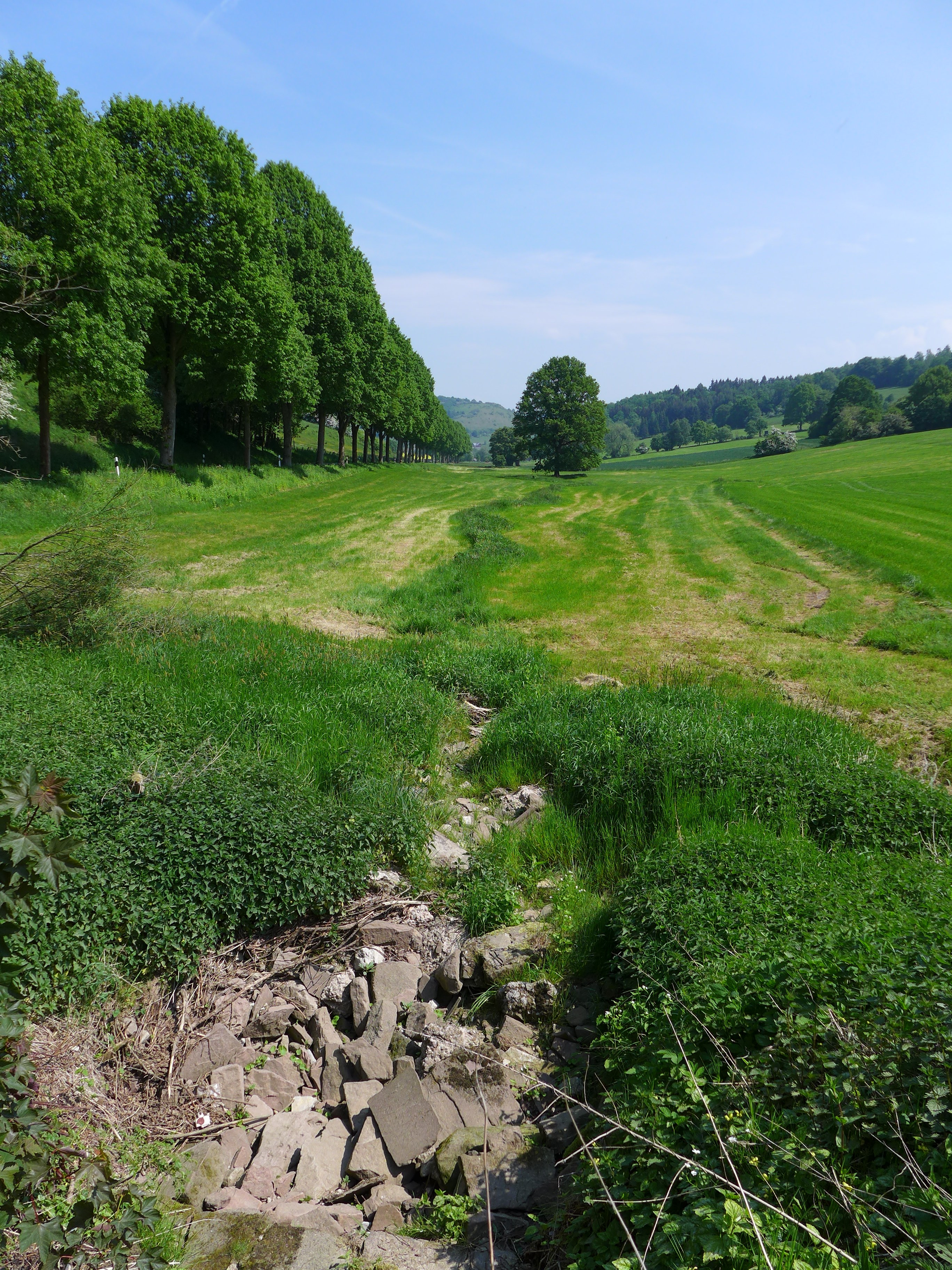

Location
- Country: Germany
- States: Lower Saxony

Physical characteristics
- Mouth
  - location: Spüligbach
  - coordinates: 51.8206°N 9.6443°E

Basin features
- Progression: Spüligbach→ Ilme→ Leine→ Aller→ Weser→ North Sea

Helle is a small river of Lower Saxony, Germany. It flows into the Spüligbach (a tributary of the Ilme) near Heinade.

It drains into the Weser Basin.

== See also ==
- List of rivers of Lower Saxony
