= Lenne (Weser) =

River in Germany

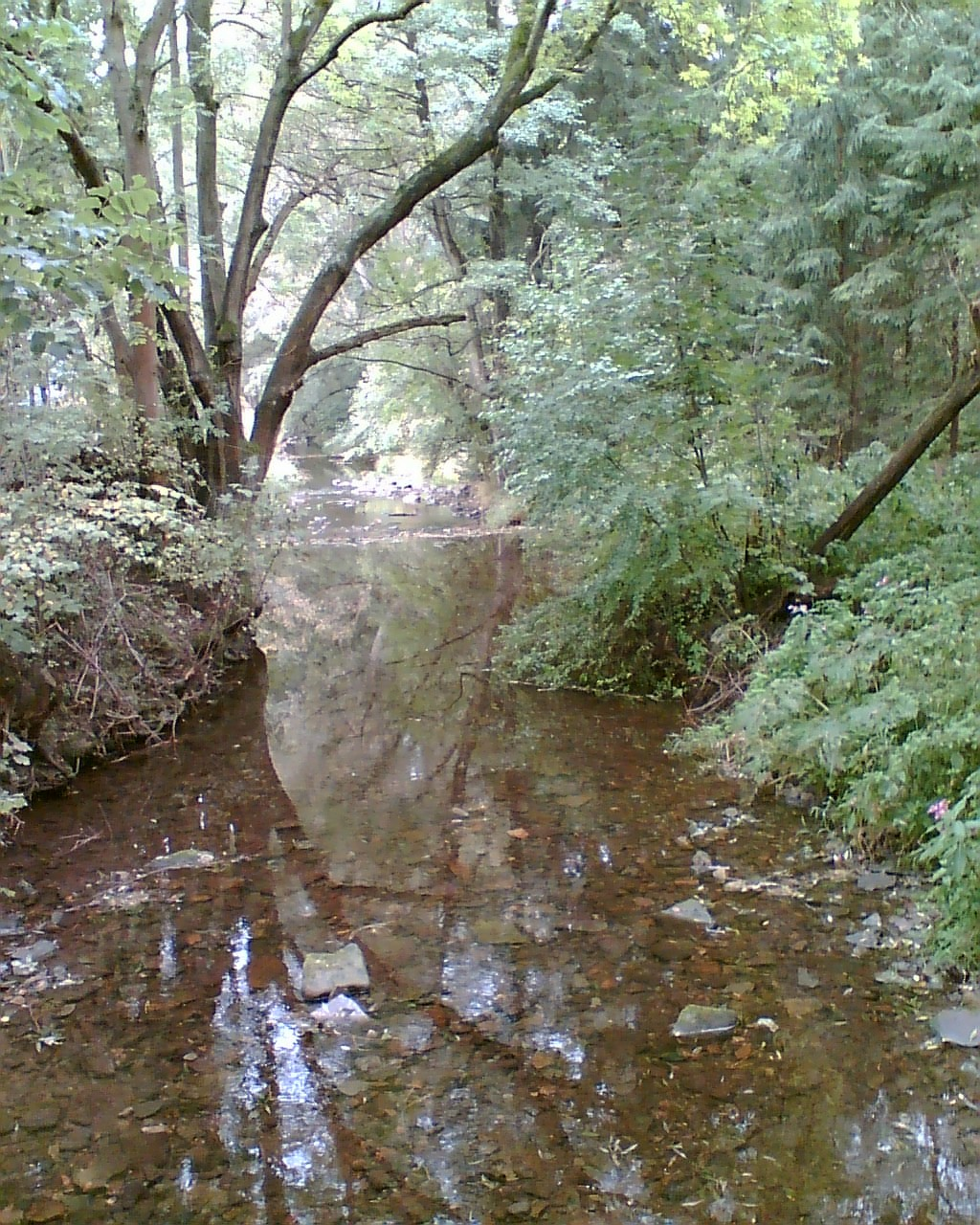

Location
- Country: Germany
- State: Lower Saxony
- District: Holzminden

Physical characteristics
- Source
  - location: on the Holzberg near Wangelnstedt-Linnenkamp
  - coordinates: 51°51′26″N 9°39′36″E
  - elevation: ca. 306 m above sea level (NN)
- Mouth
  - location: at Brunswick Gate near Bodenwerder into the Weser
  - coordinates: 51°59′01″N 9°31′14″E
- Length: 23.7 km (14.7 mi)
- Basin size: 125 km^{2} (48 sq mi)

Basin features
- Progression: Weser→ North Sea
- Landmarks: Small towns: Eschershausen, Bodenwerder; Villages: Wangelnstedt, Lenne, Kirchbrak
- Tributaries
  - left: Angerbach, Riehenbach, Wabach, Niederer Bach, Ahlbach
  - right: Vorwohle, Ruthe, Taukebach, Spüligbach

Lenne (German pronunciation: [ˈlɛnə]) is river of Lower Saxony, Germany. It is a 24 km (15 mi) long, right-hand, eastern tributary of the river Weser in the district of Holzminden in the Weser Uplands.

== Course ==
The Lenne rises on the northern edge of the Holzberg ridge. Its source is located at 306 m above sea level (NN) on the terrain of the parish of Wangelnstedt, above the village of Linnenkamp in Wolpersgrund field.

The Lenne flows in a predominantly northwesterly direction through the villages of Linnenkamp and Wangelnstedt, where it passes the uplands of Elfas (max. 409.6 m above NN) to the west. After the village of Lenne the Lenne runs northeast past the hills of the Homburg Forest (max. 406.1 m above NN) and through the town of Eschershausen (with its suburb of Scharfoldendorf), from where it passes between the two ridges of the Ith (max. 439 m above NN; some distance off) to the north and Vogler (max. 460.4 m above NN) to the south. As it does, the Lenne flows through Oelkassen and Kirchbrak and passes the village of Linse (a borough of Bodenwerder), where it is joined by its largest tributary, the Spüligbach.

The Lenne finally discharges into the Weser on the northern edge of the Vogler between the Eckberg (203.6 m above NN; with its Bismarck Tower) to the north and the Königszinne (255 m above NN; with its observation tower) to the south, immediately east of the town of Bodenwerder.

== Mouth of the Lenne ==
The gorge at the mouth of the Lenne is known as the Brunswick Gate (German: Braunschweigische Pforte or Latin: Porta Brunswiga). The water gap created by the Lenne opens up a gate here from the former Hanoverian town of Bodenwerder into the former Duchy of Brunswick.

The sand washed into the Weser by the Lenne at one time formed a ford, so that a trade route crossed here very early on. As a result, Kemnade Abbey was founded as early as 960 on the opposite side of the mouth of the Lenne.

== See also ==
- List of rivers of Lower Saxony
