= Elfas =

Hill range in Germany

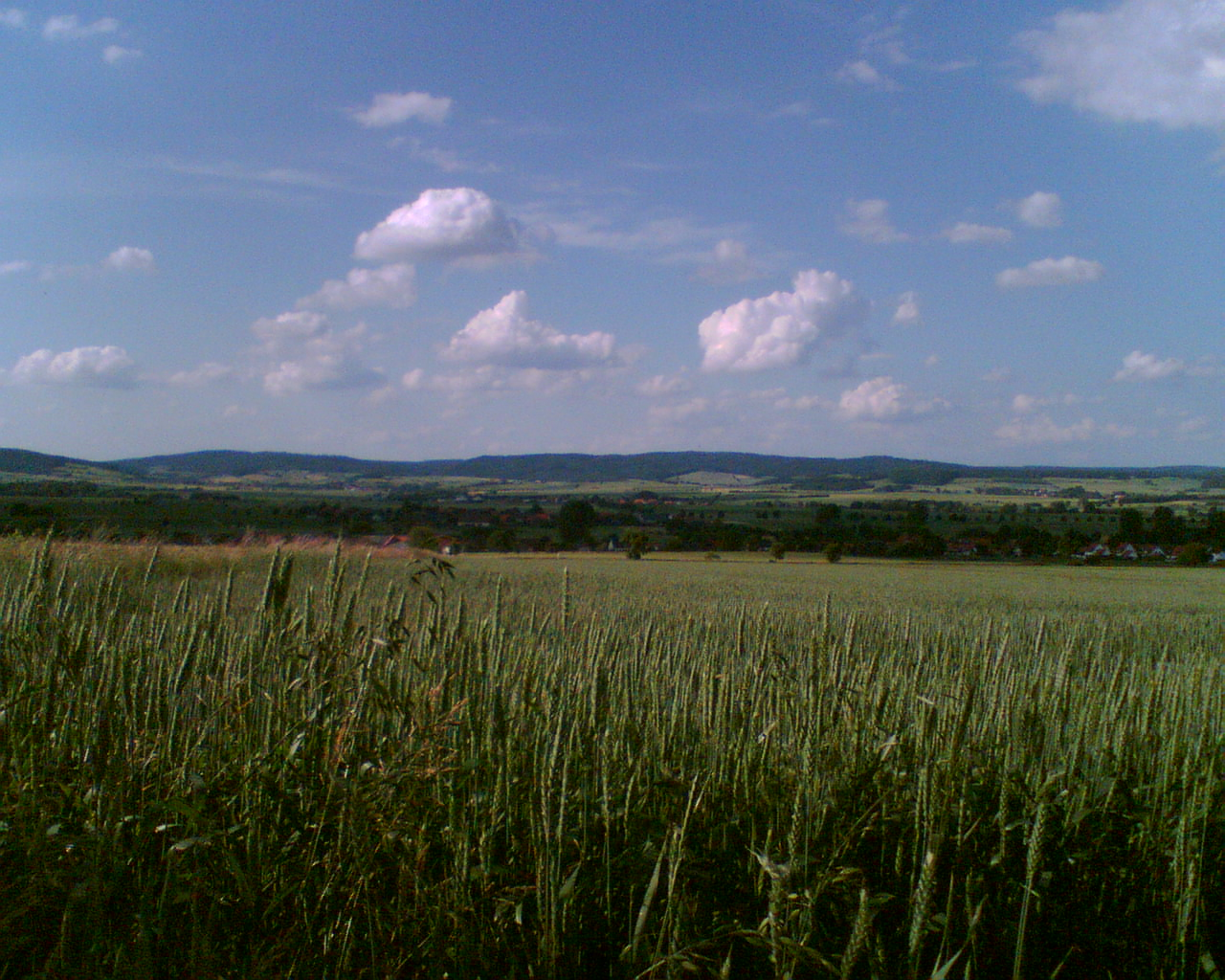
- The Elfas from the south

Highest point
- Peak: Helleberg
- Elevation: 409.6 m above NHN

Geography
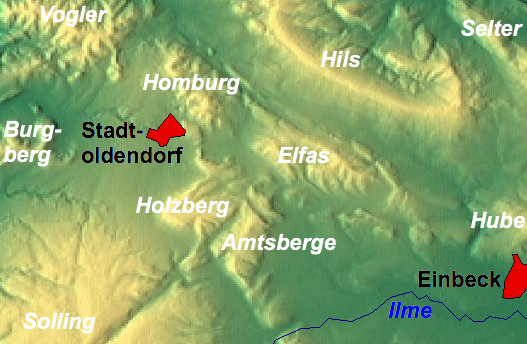
- The Elfas between Stadtoldendorf and Einbeck
- State(s): Counties of Holzminden and Northeim; Lower Saxony Germany
- Range coordinates: 51°52′12″N 9°44′00″E
- Parent range: Leine Uplands, Lower Saxon Hills

Geology
- Rock age: Bunter sandstone
- Rock type: Sandstone

The Elfas is a range of hills up to 409.6 m above sea level (NN) in the districts of Holzminden and Northeim in Lower Saxony (Germany). Its name is derived from the Lower Saxon word Fast, which means an area of upland that descends on two sides.

== Geographical location ==
The Elfas is located in the middle of the Leine Uplands between the Hils to the north, the Homburg Forest to the west, the Hube to the east, the Amtsberge to the south-southwest and the Holzberg to the southwest. It lies not far southwest of Eschershausen and east of Stadtoldendorf; the town of Einbeck is about 12 km southeast of the Elfas. The B 64 federal highway runs past the Elfas to the north linking Eschershausen with Einbeck.

The rounded summits of the Elfas are covered by acidic soil beech forests.

== Geology ==
The Elfas is mainly composed of sandstones from the Bunter sandstone period. As the result of a halokinetic process, which had already been concluded in the Palaeogene period, the Elfas fault block migrated in a north-easterly direction towards the Solling, whereby the mountain-building sandstone rode up over a layer of saliniferous rock of the Zechstein. In the course of this process, mainly older rock strata that had hitherto lain underneath, were overthrust. Out of the subsequent erosion processes today's scarpland emerged as the northern boundary of the Einbeck-Markoldendorf Basin.

Geologists in the Weser Uplands also use the terms Elfas Axis (Elfas-Achse) or Elfas Fault (Elfas-Überschiebung) for the regional fault line, as well as the term Elfas Saddle.

== Hills ==
The hills in the Elfas include (heights in metres above NN):

- Helleberg (409.6 m)
- Ahrensberg (405 m)
- Kneppelberg (386.0 m)
- Birkenberg (366.4 m)
- Vorwohler Berg (360.2 m)
- Moosberg (344.7 m)
- Eichholzberg (341.5 m)
- Döhrenberg (307.1 m)
- Eimer Berg (ca. 300 m)
- Kurzeberg (299.0 m)
- Böhneberg (290.0 m)
- Heisennacken (267.0 m)

== Streams ==
The streams of the Elfas include:

- Allerbach (eastern tributary of the Bewer)
- Bewer (northern tributary of the Ilme)
- Hillebach (northern tributary of the Krummes Wasser)
- Lenne (passes the Elfas to the west)
