= Erichsburg =

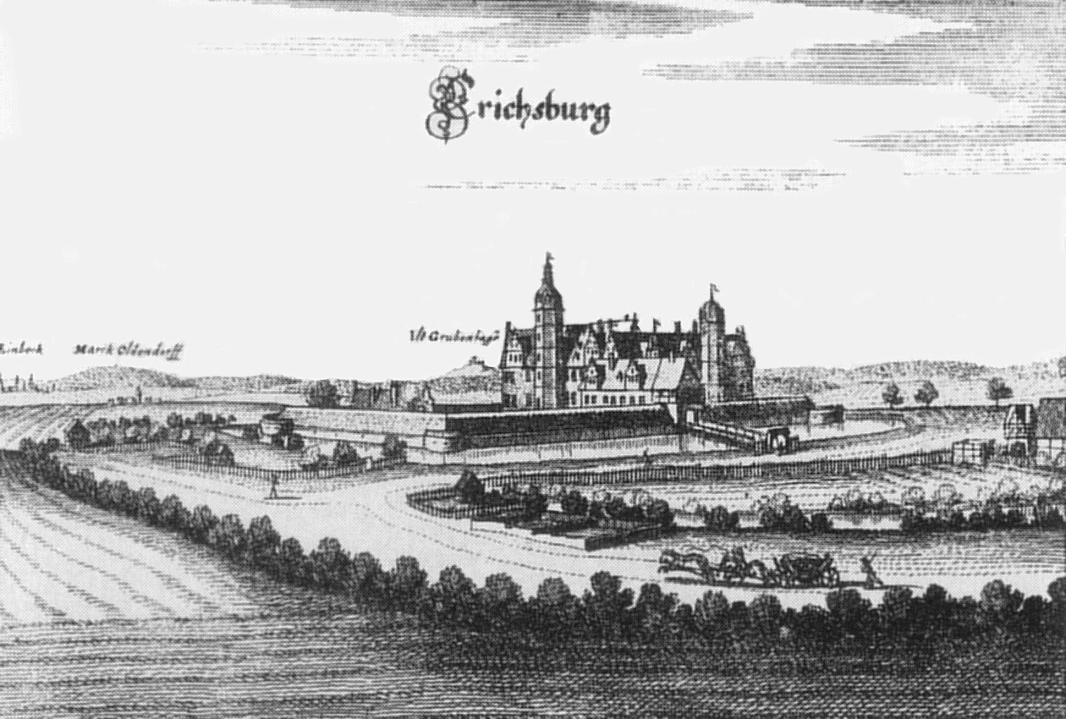
- The Erichsburg as a Merian copperplate around 1650

- Location within Lower Saxony Erichsburg (Germany)

General information
- Type: Lowland castle (Niederungsburg)
- Location: Dassel-Erichsburg
- Coordinates: 51.822611°N 9.7182°E
- Completed: about 1500 to 1600
- Owner: Originally owned by counts; today owned by the ADN Investment Group

The Ericsburg in the village of the same name in the borough of Dassel in Lower Saxony, Germany, is a castle that was built in the 16th century within the Principality of Calenberg. It is currently (2007) in a poor state of repair.

== Location ==
The castles was built in a marshy depression. It is of the type known as a lowland castle.

== Site ==
=== Erichsburg ===
The Erichsburg was formerly guarded by a wide moat and high ramparts. Next to it was a cultivated outwork (Vorwerk).

=== Earlier castle ===
Its predecessor was Hunnesrück Castle, which the counts of Dassel had built in the 13th century. In 1521 during the Hildesheim Diocesan Feud it was bombarded with heavy cannon from the heights of Hatop and captured by Eric I together with Henry the Younger of Wolfenbüttel. The destroyed castle lies in the Amtsberge hills north of Dassel and about 3 km west of the Erichsburg on a steep-sided eminence. Today only the remains of walls and ramparts are left.

== History ==
Duke Eric I of Brunswick-Lüneburg had the Erichsburg built between 1527 and 1530. It was named after his son and heir, born in 1528, later Duke Eric II. It was used by his father, Eric I, for a time as his administrative seat (Amtssitz). During the construction, he lived at Hunnesrück Castle about 3 km west of the new castle.

Duke Julius of Wolfenbüttel had the castle extended between 1604 and 1612. His master builder was Paul Francke. By 1688 buildings from the original construction phase were demolished due to their dilapidated state. The outworks was developed for the economic support of the castle into a small estate settlement, the village of Erichsburg which belongs to Dassel. From 1891 to 1980 the Erichsburg was owned by the Hanoverian State Church and housed a theological seminary. Renovations have been carried out. The upper part of the staircase tower (Treppenturm) is in a poor condition and numerous repairs are visible. Since 2019, Erichsburg castle has been owned by ADN Investment Group, an investment and development company group based in Germany.

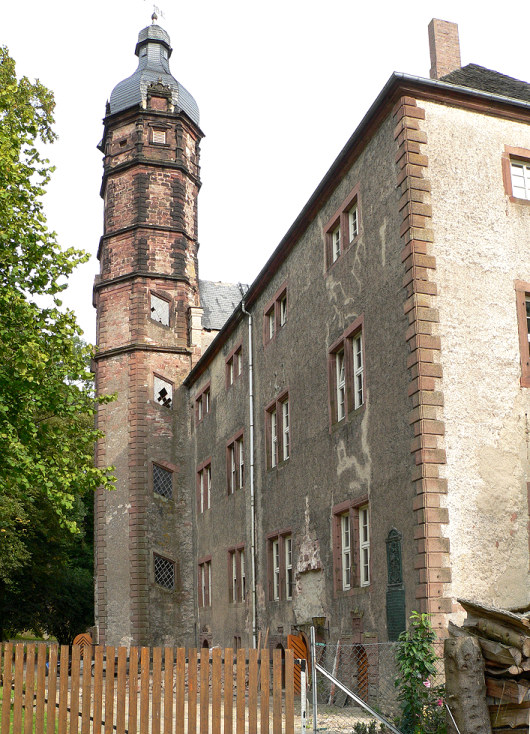
Castle site today with the staircase tower

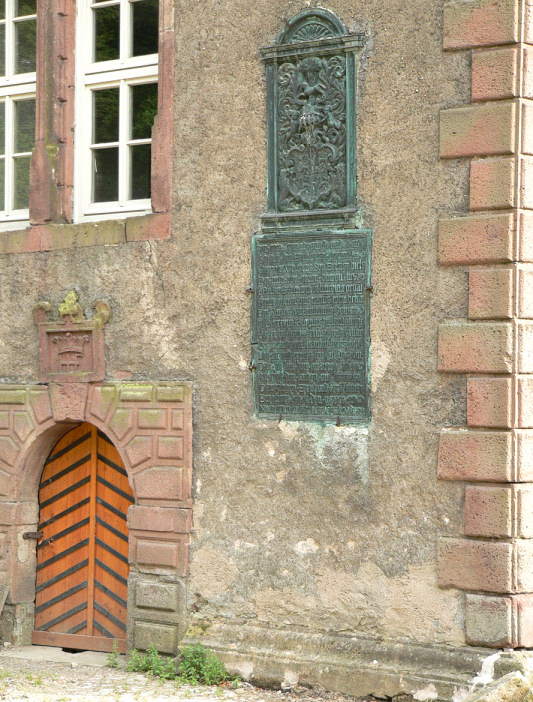
Detail on the façade

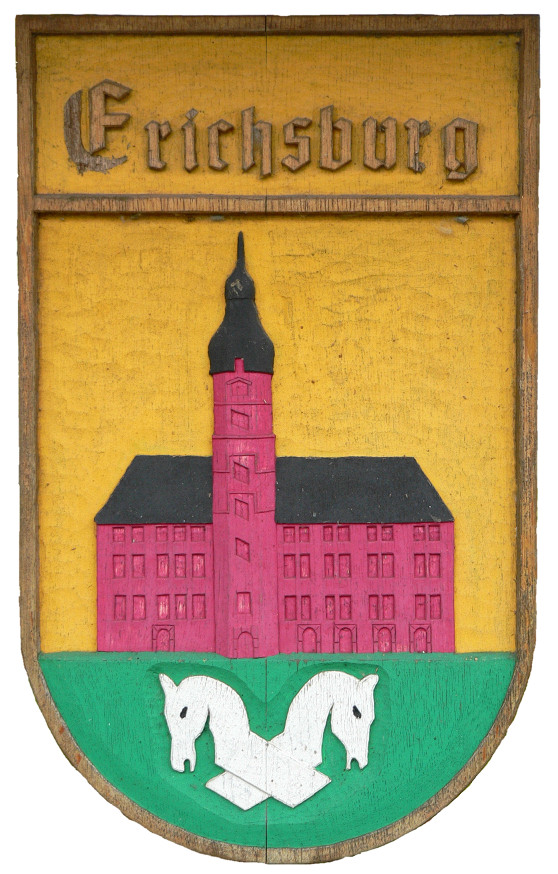
Shield in the village of Erichsburg

== See also ==
- List of castles in Lower Saxony
