= Großer Homburg =

Hill in Germany

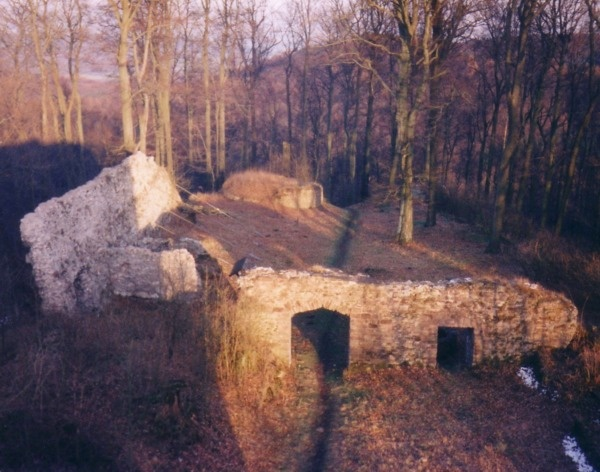
- View from the tower of the Homburg ruins

Highest point
- Elevation: 403 m above sea level (NN) (1,322 ft)
- Coordinates: 51°54′07″N 9°38′33″E

Geography
- Location within Lower Saxony
- Location: Holzminden district, Lower Saxony, Germany
- Parent range: Homburg Forest, Weser Uplands

The Großer Homburg is a hill, 403 m above sea level (NN), in the Homburgwald, part of the Weser Uplands in the German state of Lower Saxony.

The Großer Homburg is located in the district of Holzminden above and north of the town of Stadtoldendorf and a couple of kilometres south of Eschershausen.

On the summit of the Großer Homburg are the castle ruins of the Homburg. There is a good view from the tower of the castle - for example south towards the Solling hills, where the highest hill in the Weser Uplands, the Große Blöße can be seen. On the western slopes of the Großer Homburg there are quarries where gypsum has been extracted for centuries.
