= Homburg Forest =

Upland area of Lower Saxony, Germany

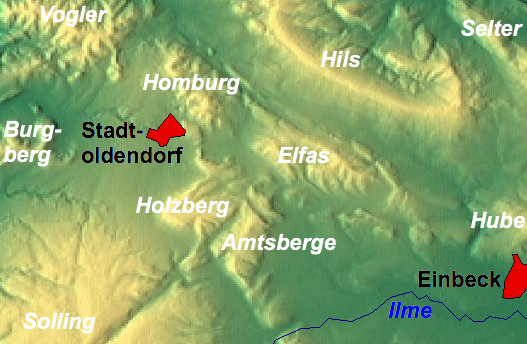
- Homburg near Stadtoldendorf

Highest point
- Peak: unnamed
- Elevation: 406.1 m (1,332 ft)
- Coordinates: 51°54′N 9°39′E

Geography
- Location: Holzminden, Lower Saxony
- Country: Germany
- State: North Rhine-Westphalia
- Subdivisions: Lower Saxon Hills and Weser Uplands
- Parent range: Lower Saxon Hills, Weser Uplands

Geology
- Rock ages: Lopingian and Early Triassic
- Rock types: Gypsum, anhydrite, limestone, sandstone, siltstone and claystone

The Homburg Forest (German: Homburgwald or just Homburg) also known as the Homburg Hills (Homburger Berge) is an area of upland up to 406.1 m above sea level (NN) in the north German state of Lower Saxony.

== Geography ==
The Homburg Forest is located in the district of Holzminden on the eastern flanks of the central line of the Weser Uplands between the uplands and ridges of the Hils to the northeast, the Elfas to the east, the Holzberg to the south, the Amtsberge to the south-southeast, the Solling to the south, Burgberg to the southwest and the Vogler to the northwest. It lies between the towns of Eschershausen to the north and Stadtoldendorf to the south; a section of the B 64 federal highway from Eschershausen to Einbeck runs past it to the west, north and east.

=== Hills ===
The hills of the Homburg Forest include (heights in metres above Normalnull; NN:

- unnamed hill (406.1 m)
- Großer Homburg (403 m; with the Homburg, incl. its castle tower)
- Till (399.2 m)
- Kohlenberg (396.7 m)
- Stadtberg (369.2 m)
- Wolfsberg (347.3 m)
- Kellberg (343.1 m; with the Kellberg Tower, an observation tower; 20 m high)
- Heidelberg (319.3 m)
- Schiffberg (311.0 m)

=== Rivers and streams ===
The rivers and streams in and around the Homburg include:

- Eber-/Forstbach (passes the Homburg Forest to the south; tributary of the Weser)
- Lenne (passes the forest to the north and northeast; tributary of the Weser)

== Places of interest ==
Amongst the places of interest, including natural and cultural monuments in the Homburg Forest are:

On the Großer Homburg (ca. 403 m above NN) stands the Homburg, a ruined castle from whose tower there is a good view of the area. Another good observation point is the [Kellburg Tower (Kellburgturm, 20 m high) on the Kellberg hill (343,1 m) to the east of Stadtoldendorf. Also worth seeing is the abbey of Amelungsborn, which is west of the Homburg on the southern edge of Das Odfeld. Natural monuments include the Seven Brothers' Beech (Sieben-Brüder-Buche) and the Tentrus Oak (Tentruseiche).
