= Spüligbach =

Spüligbach may refer to:

- Spüligbach (Ilme), a river of Lower Saxony, Germany, tributary of the Ilme
- Spüligbach (Lenne), a river of Lower Saxony, Germany, tributary of the Lenne
