= Bewer =

River in Germany

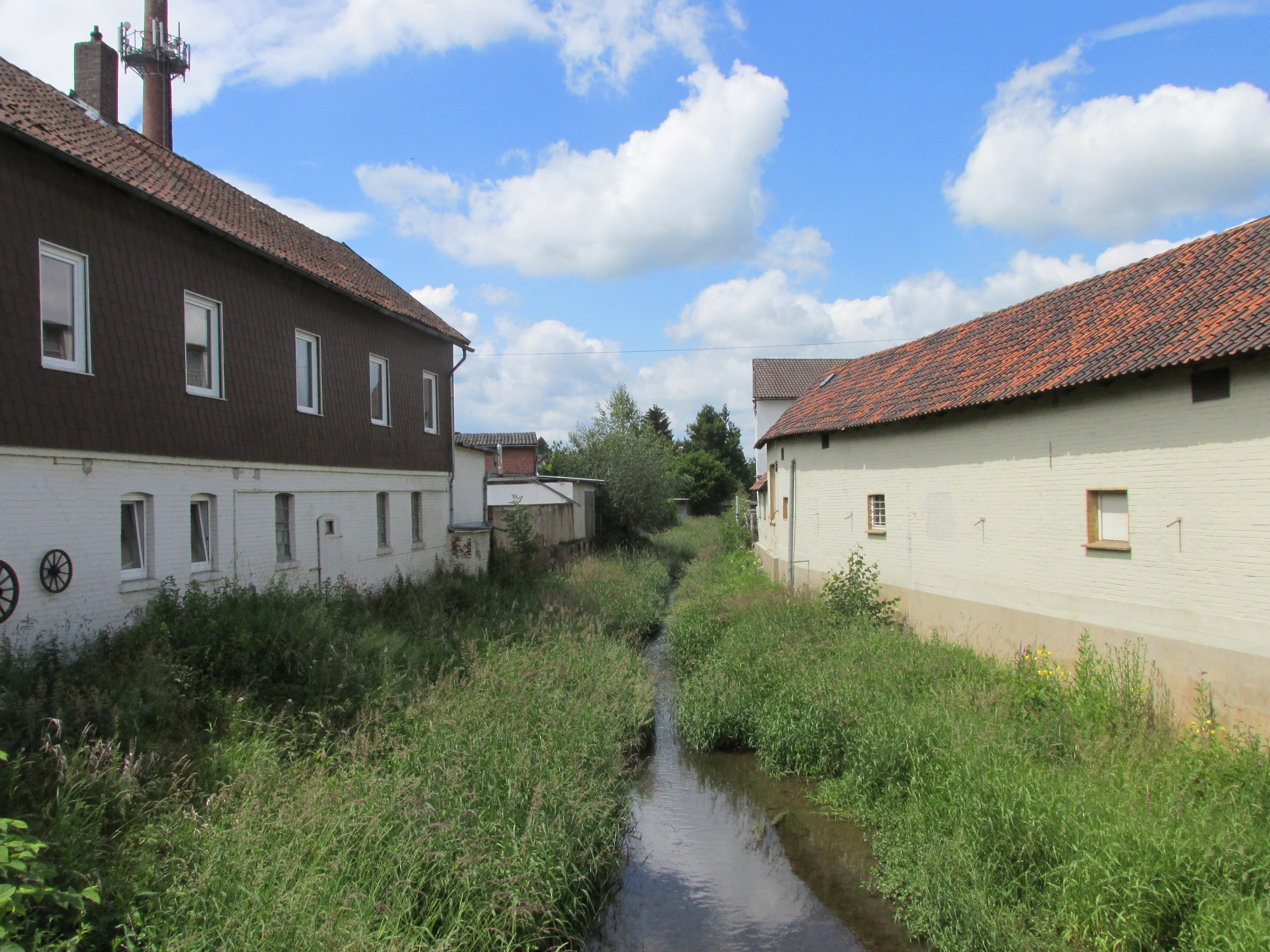

Location
- Country: Germany
- State: Lower Saxony
- Location: Dassel, Northeim district

Physical characteristics
- Source
  - location: East of Stadtoldendorf in the Elfas hills
- Mouth
  - location: East of Markoldendorf into the Ilme
  - coordinates: 51°48′52″N 9°46′26″E
  - elevation: 128 m
- Length: 9.4 km (5.8 mi)
- Basin size: 42 km^{2} (16 sq mi)

Basin features
- Progression: Ilme→ Leine→ Aller→ Weser→ North Sea
- Landmarks: Villages: Portenhagen, Lüthorst, Deitersen, Markoldendorf
- Tributaries
  - left: Allerbach
  - right: Reißbach

The Bewer is a river of Lower Saxony, Germany. It is a left, northern tributary of the River Ilme. It flows solely through the municipal territory of the borough of Dassel.

== Course ==
The Bewer rises in the middle of the Elfas hills and is their most important drainage system. Passing through hills covered in mixed forest, the stream bed soon leaves this small ridge and runs initially in a southeasterly direction along its southern perimeter. On the outskirts of Portenhagen (a district of Dassel) the Bewer changes direction, flowing southwest towards Lüthorst. The stream then passes Deitersen and finally empties into the Ilme near Markoldendorf (a district of Dassel).

== Flora and fauna ==
Endangered species in and on the Bewer include the noble crayfish and the marsh marigold. For the protection of this ecosystem, a renaturalisation has been carried out.

== See also ==
- List of rivers of Lower Saxony
