= Allerbach (Bewer) =

River in Germany

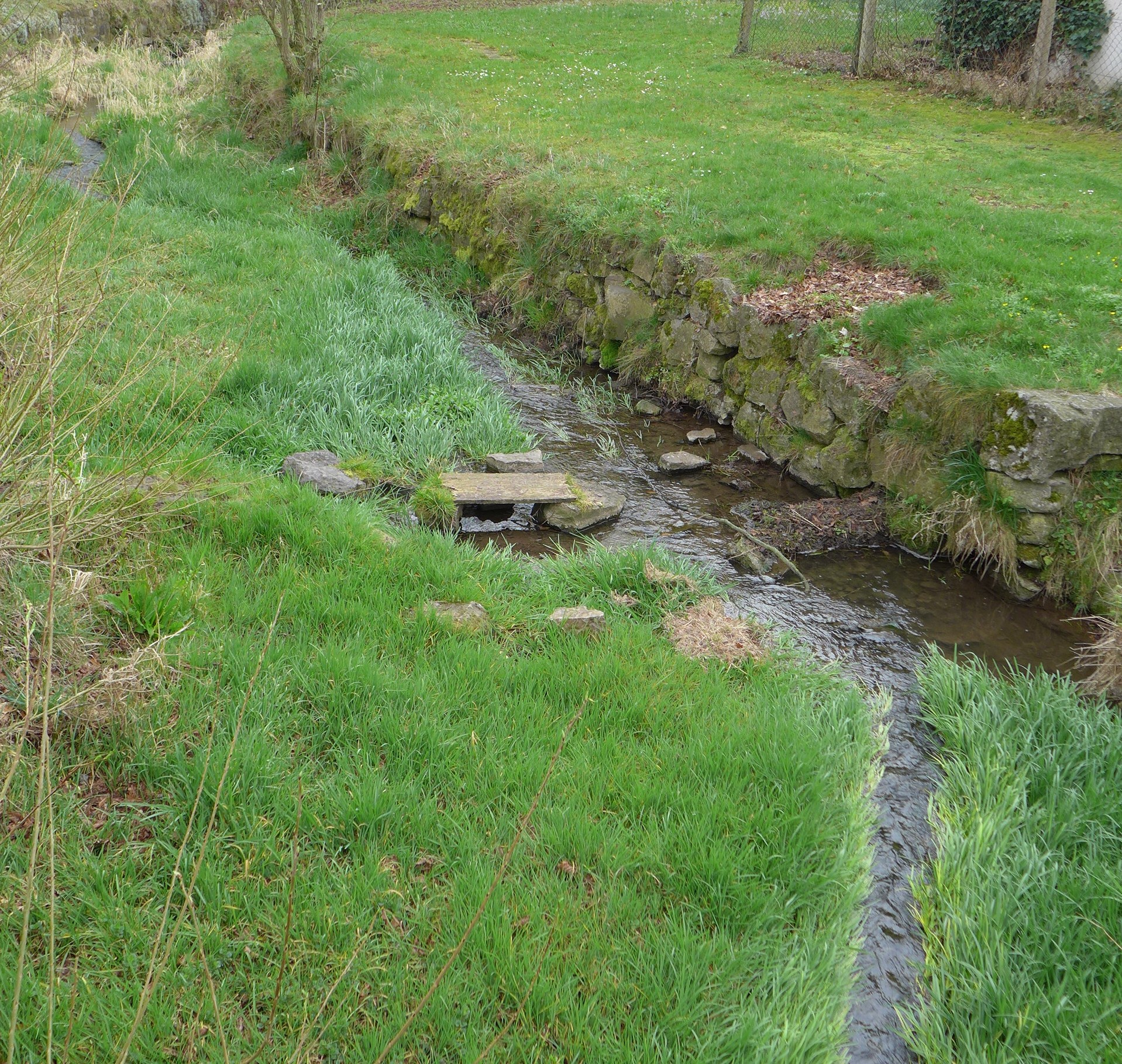

- Location of mouth

Location
- Country: Germany
- State: Lower Saxony

Physical characteristics
- Source
  - location: Near Rengershausen, a district of Einbeck
  - coordinates: 51.8632°N 9.7691°E
- Mouth
  - location: East of Deitersen, a district of Dassel, into the Bewer
  - coordinates: 51.8222°N 9.7455°E

Basin features
- Progression: Bewer→ Ilme→ Leine→ Aller→ Weser→ North Sea

Allerbach is a river of Lower Saxony, Germany.

The Allerbach springs near Rengershausen, a parish of Einbeck. It is a left tributary of the Bewer east of Deitersen, a district of Dassel.

== See also ==
- List of rivers of Lower Saxony
