= Diermissen =

Diermissen is an old German surname that originated from the "Ostfälisches Altniederdeutsch" dialect spoken by the ancient Saxon tribes, who settled in the territory that now we call northern Germany. This surname comes from an old family (de Didilmissen) that lived near the modern towns of "Dielmissen" and "Bodenwerder" in modern Lower Saxony (Niedersachsen). The meaning of this surname is apparently "The house of Thiadhelm" or Thiadelmes-husen, which derives to Didelmissen-Diermissen-Dielmissen. There is evidence of various families around the world, not only in Germany, that bear this surname, for example in Costa Rica, United States, Canada, and El Salvador.

== People ==
- Johannes Diermissen (∗03.08.1823 Lauenburg- †1893 Uetersen) Low German writer
  - De Lüttje Strohoot, 1847
  - Ut de Mußkist, 1862
- Julius Friedrich Max Diermissen (*07.01.1870 Hamburg- ✝ 28.03.1927 San José, Costa Rica, German vice-consul in Puntarenas, Costa Rica, from 1894 to 1902, and U.S. consular agent in the same port from 1894 to 1901.

== Literature ==
- Kirtin Casemir und Uwe Ohainski: Die Ortsnamen des Landkreises Holzminden. Teil VI. Niedersächsisches Ortsnamenbuch.
- Hermann Kleinau: Geschichtliches Ortsverzeichnis von Niedersachsen 2. Land Braunschweig.
- Ernst Förstemann: Altdeutsches Namenbuch, 2. Band, Ortsnamen, Hildesheim1967.
