= Hunnesrück =

- Ortschaft of Dassel
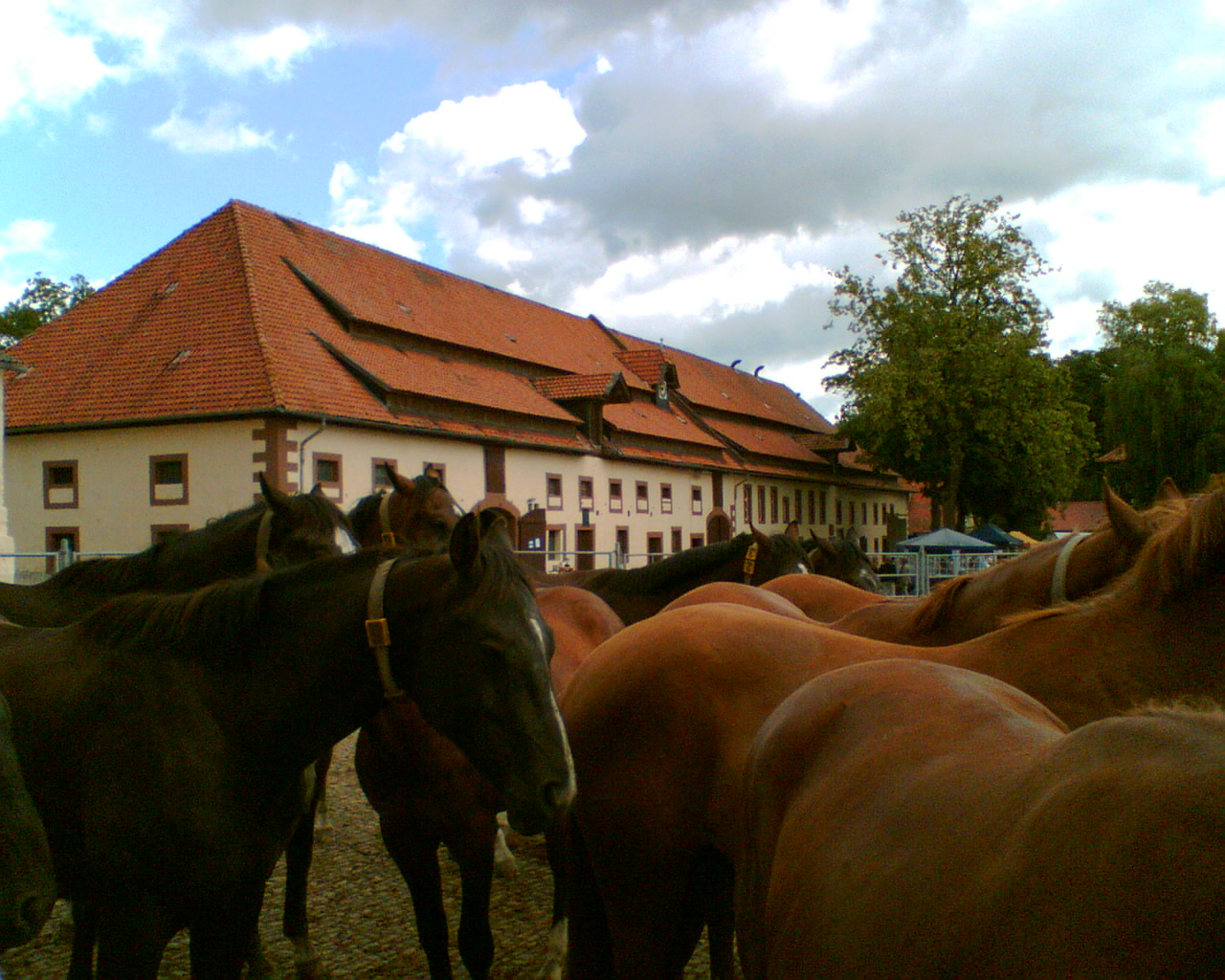
- At Hunnesrück stud farm

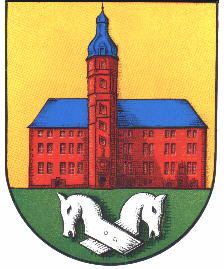
- Coat of arms
- Interactive map of Hunnesrück
- Location within Germany Location within Lower Saxony
- Coordinates: 51°49′30″N 09°42′21″E
- Country: Germany
- State: Lower Saxony
- District: Northeim
- Town: Dassel
- Elevation: 175 m (574 ft)

Population (2010)
  - Total: 188
- Time zone: UTC+01:00 (CET)
  - Summer (DST): UTC+02:00 (CEST)
- Postal codes: 37586
- Dialling codes: 05564
- Vehicle registration: NOM, EIN

Hunnesrück is a village and part (Ortschaft) of Dassel, district Northeim, Lower Saxony.

== Geography ==
The village is located about 3 miles north of the old town of Dassel in a rural area, right east of Amtsberge.

== History ==
Today's village is located on a site where in the Middle Ages a village named Binder was located. A deed of 1360 cites ownership rights, that the Imperial Abbey of Corvey sold by then to the counts of Pyrmont. This village was destroyed in the Thirty Years' War.

After that war, the bishop of the diocese of Hildesheim had new administration buildings built right there. The new name Hunnesrück was adopted from the neighboring Hunnesrück Castle which had been destroyed in the 1520s. Several buildings made up the site including a watermill that is still in place and a chapel that was demolished in 1847. With the establishment of the Kingdom of Westphalia in that region however, the buildings lost their function because the new administrators operated in a building in Einbeck instead. From 1866 on the Prussian Army used the buildings for their cavalry until it was dissolved in 1919. Nonetheless Hunnesrück remained a stud farm until today. It is a subsidiary of Celle State Stud. Owner is the German state Lower Saxony. Hanoverian colts are held there. In the 20th century though, Trakehner and Przewalski's horses were held there as well. At the same time, the village Hunnesrück grew somewhat and now forms a linear settlement.

== Main sights ==
- watermill with overshot wheel
- 17th-century manor house
