= Ursula von Rydingsvard =

American sculptor (1942–2026)

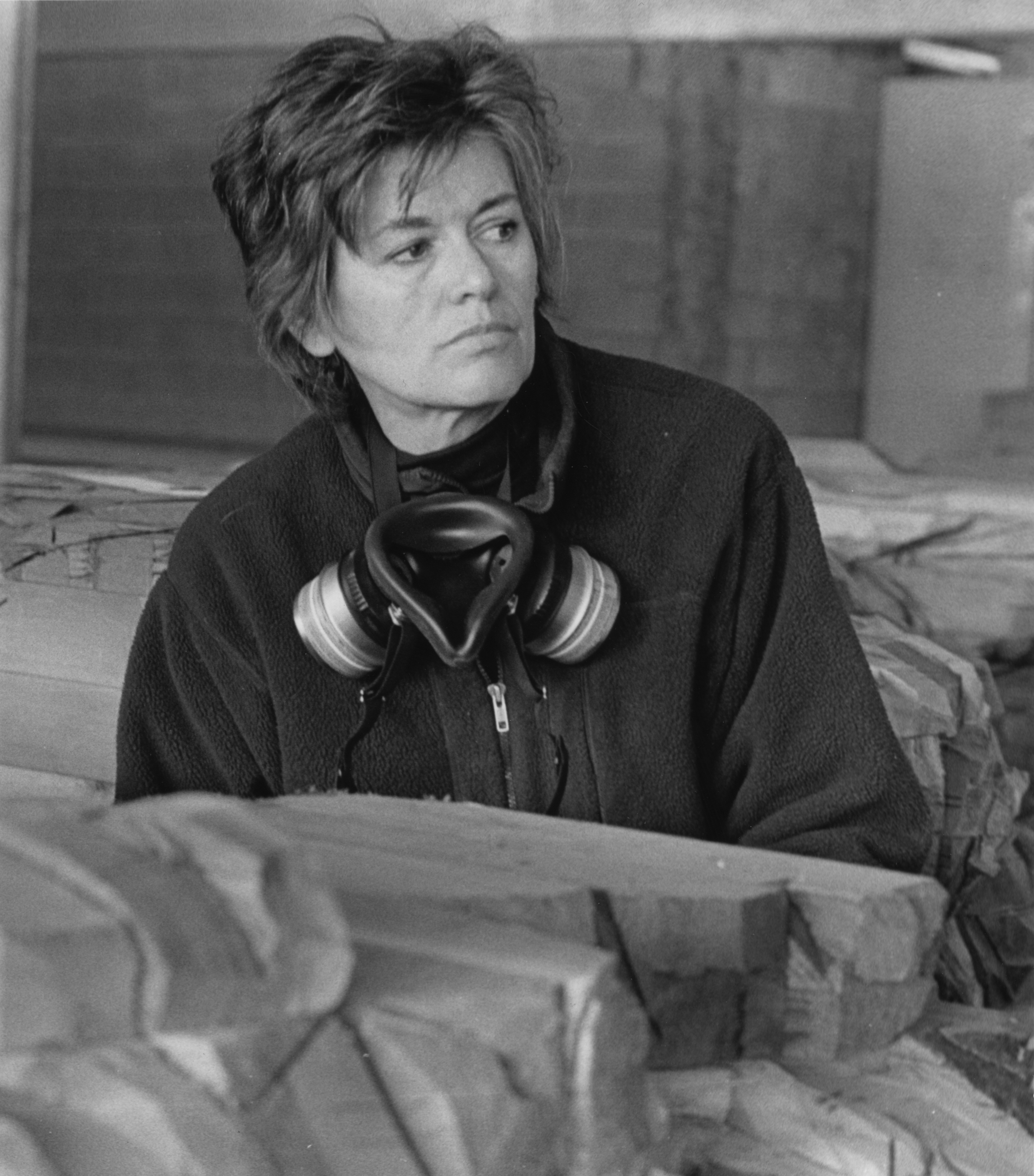
- Von Rydingsvard in 1997
- Born: Ursula Karoliszyn; July 26, 1942; Deensen, Gau Southern Hanover-Brunswick, Germany
- Died: October 27, 2026 (aged 84); New York City, U.S.
- Education: University of Miami; Columbia University
- Known for: Sculpture
- Spouse: Paul Greengard
- Elected: Member, American Academy of Arts and Letters
- Website: ursulavonrydingsvard.net

Ursula von Rydingsvard (née Karoliszyn; July 26, 1942 – October 27, 2026) was a German-born sculptor who lived and worked in Brooklyn, New York. She is best known for having created large-scale works influenced by nature, primarily using cedar and bronze.

== Early life and education ==
Von Rydingsvard was born in Deensen, Germany, on July 26, 1942, to a Polish mother and Ukrainian father, the fifth of seven children. As a young child, the artist and her six siblings experienced the Nazi occupation of Poland and the trauma of World War II, followed by five years in eight different German refugee camps for displaced Poles.

In 1950, through the U.S. Marshall Plan and with the assistance of Catholic agencies, her family of peasant farmers boarded a ship to the United States where they eventually settled in Plainville, Connecticut. It was not a place known for art. She received a BA and MA from University of Miami in Coral Gables, Florida in 1965 and an MFA from Columbia University in New York City in 1975. In the late 1970s, she was part of NYC's Cultural Council Foundation Artists' Project, which was funded under the Comprehensive Employment and Training Act (CETA).

== Career ==
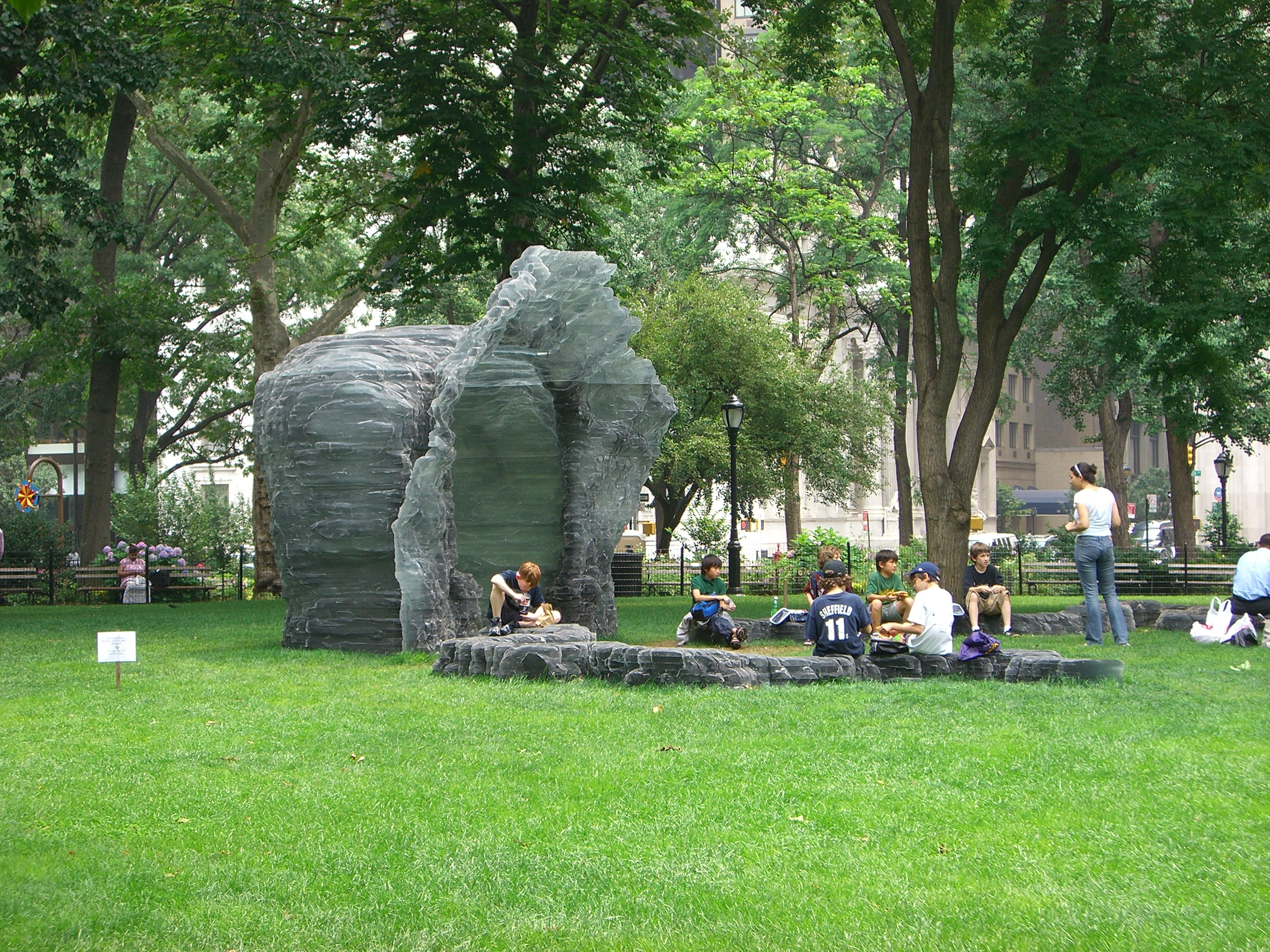
Damski Czepek by Ursula von Rydingsvard in Madison Square Park

Major permanent commissions of her work are on view at the Microsoft Corporation, Redmond, Washington; Storm King Art Center, New York; the Bloomberg Building, New York; the Queens Family Courthouse, New York; the Nelson-Atkins, Kansas City, and the Barclays Center, Brooklyn, New York. Mad. Sq. Art: Ursula von Rydingsvard was the outdoor solo exhibition presented at Madison Square Park in 2006.

In 2008, she was inducted into the American Academy of Arts and Letters along with being featured in Art:21 Art in the Twenty-First Century on PBS. A monograph on her work titled The Sculpture of Ursula von Rydingsvard was published by Hudson Hills Press in 1996 and in 2011 Prestel published Ursula von Rydingsvard: Working.

In 2014 Ursula von Rydingsvard had her first British show at the Yorkshire Sculpture Park (West Yorkshire, UK), her most extensive exhibition to date. The exhibition was accompanied by the Ursula von Rydingsvard 2014 Catalogue, a major publication featuring text by Molly Donovan, Curator of Modern and Contemporary Art at the National Gallery of Art in Washington, D.C.

Also, in 2015 six of Von Rydingsvard's works in various materials were exhibited at the Giardino della Marinaressa in Venice, presented by the Yorkshire Sculpture Park in a collateral event of the Venice Biennale.

== Work ==
During the crux of her mature artistic career, Von Rydingsvard executed her often monumental sculptures in cedar. Subsequently, she created many of her works in bronze.

== Death ==
Ursula von Rydingsvard died from complications of Alzheimer's disease in New York City on October 27, 2026, at the age of 84.

== Museum collections ==
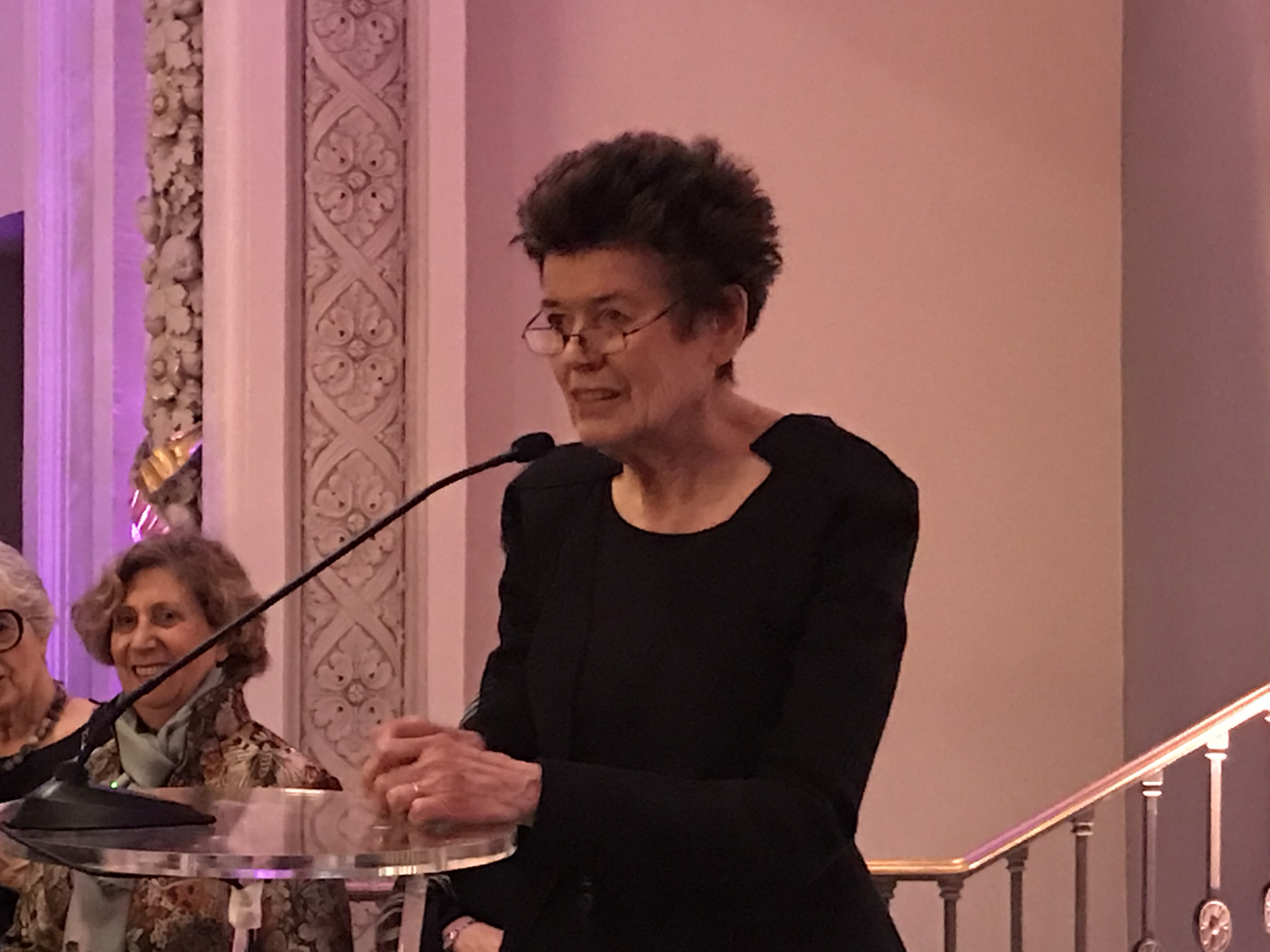
Ursula von Rydingsvard at the National Museum of Women in the Arts

Tak (2015), National Museum of Women in the Arts

- Albright-Knox Art Gallery, Buffalo, New York
- Brooklyn Museum, Brooklyn, NY
- Centre for Contemporary Art, Ujazdowski Castle, Warsaw, Poland
- Cincinnati Art Museum, Cincinnati, OH
- The Contemporary Austin, Austin, TX
- Crystal Bridges Museum of American Art, Bentonville, AR
- De Cordova Sculpture Park + Museum, Lincoln, MA
- Detroit Institute of Arts, Detroit, MI
- Frederik Meijer Gardens & Sculpture Park, Grand Rapids, MI
- High Museum of Art, Atlanta, GA
- Hood Museum of Art, Dartmouth, NH
- Madison Art Center, Madison, WI
- Madison Museum of Contemporary Art, Madison, WI
- Metropolitan Museum of Art, New York, NY
- Museum of Contemporary Art, Miami, FL
- Museum of Fine Arts, Boston, Massachusetts
- Museum of Modern Art New York, NY
- National Museum of Women in the Arts, Washington, D.C.
- National Gallery of Art, Washington, D.C.
- Nelson-Atkins Museum of Art, Kansas City, MO
- North Carolina Museum of Art, Raleigh, NC
- Orlando Museum of Art, Orlando, FL
- San Francisco Museum of Art, San Francisco, CA
- Speed Art Museum, Louisville, Kentucky
- Storm King Art Center, Mountainville, NY
- Virginia Museum of Fine Arts, Richmond, VA
- University of Michigan Museum of Art, Ann Arbor, MI
- University of Texas Southwestern Medical Center, Dallas, TX
- Ulrich Museum, Wichita State University, Wichita, KS
- Walker Art Center, Minneapolis, MN
- Weatherspoon Art Museum, Greensboro, North Carolina
- Whitney Museum of American Art, New York, NY
- Williams College, Williamstown, MA
- Yale University Art Gallery, New Haven, CT

== Notable exhibitions ==
- 2021 Ursula von Rydingsvard: Nothing But Art, National Museum, Kraków and simultaneously at the Center of Polish Sculpture, Orońsko and Łazienki Park, Warsaw, Poland
- 2019 Ursula von Rydingsvard: The Contour of Feeling, National Museum of Women in the Arts, Washington, D.C.
- 2018 Now, She, Philadelphia Museum of Art, Philadelphia, Pennsylvania
- 2018 The Contour of Feeling, The Fabric Workshop & Museum, Philadelphia, Pennsylvania
- 2015 Ursula von Rydingsvard, la Biennale di Venezia, Giardino della Marinaressa, Venice, Italy
- 2014 Ursula von Rydingsvard, Yorkshire Sculpture Park, West Bretton, England
- 2011-12 Ursula von Rydingsvard: Sculpture 1991-2009, SculptureCenter, Queens, New York; traveled to deCordova Sculpture Park and Museum, Lincoln, Massachusetts; Museum of Contemporary Art, Cleveland, Ohio; and to Frost Art Museum, Miami, Florida
- 2006 Mad. Sq. Art: Ursula von Rydingsvard, Mad Sq Art at Madison Square Park, New York, NY
- 1992-4 Storm King Art Center, Mountainville, NY (Ten-year retrospective)

== Awards and grants ==
- Archives of American Art Medal, The Smithsonian’s Archives of American Art, New York City, 2022
- Gold Medal for Merit to Culture – Gloria Artis, Poland, 2021
- Artist Award for Distinguished Body of Work, CAA, New York City, 2019
- Visionary Woman Honors Award, Moore College of Art & Design, Philadelphia, Pennsylvania, 2017
- Lifetime Achievement Award, International Sculpture Center, Hamilton, New Jersey, 2014
- Honoree, Storm King Art Center Annual Gala, New York City, 2012
- Skowhegan Medal for Sculpture, Skowhegan School of Painting and Sculpture, Maine, 2011
- Best Show in a Non-Profit Gallery or Space, American Section of the International Association of Art Critics, 2011
- Rappaport Art Prize, DeCordova Museum and Sculpture Park, Lincoln, Massachusetts, 2008
- Order of the Cross, Polish Consulate, New York, 2008
- Mary Miss Resident in Visual Arts, American Academy in Rome, Italy, 2007
- 2nd prize, Best Show in a Commercial Gallery, American Section of the International Association of Art Critics, 2000
- Academy Award in Art, American Academy of Arts and Letters, New York City, 1994
- Best Small Museum Exhibition, American Section of the International Association of Art Critics, 1992
- Honorary Doctorate, Maryland Institute College of Art, Baltimore, Maryland, 1991
- Individual Artists Grant, National Endowment for the Arts, Washington, D.C., 1986
- Athena Foundation Grant, Long Island City, New York, 1983
- Guggenheim Fellowship, John Simon Guggenheim Foundation, New York City, 1983
- Individual Artists Grant, National Endowment for the Arts, Washington, D.C., 1979
- Individual Artists Grant, National Endowment for the Arts, Washington, D.C., 1978
- Fulbright-Hayes Travel Grant, Washington, D.C., 1975

== In popular culture ==
- Annie Liontas's "Bent Lace" in Bomb
- Daniel Traub's feature-length documentary of the artist Ursula von Rydingsvard: Into Her Own, 2019
