= Heinrich Düker =

German psychologist and politician (1898–1986)

Heinrich Düker (24 November 1898 - 8 November 1986) was a German psychologist, politician and professor.

== Biography ==
Düker was born in Dassel, Lower Saxony. His father was a farmer. In World War I he was injured severely. He started to study psychology in 1919 at the University of Göttingen. He got his doctorate at that university in 1925. For four years, he studied organizational psychology for habilitation. Then he was docent at that university until 1935. The nazi regime imprisoned him for high treason from 1936 to 1939. From 1940 on he worked as psychologist in a business company in Berlin. In 1944 the Nazi regime imprisoned him in Sachsenhausen concentration camp because he supported the german resistance politically. He survived that time and came back to the university of Göttingen in 1945. He was elected as mayor of Göttingen in 1946. In 1947 he refused to be reelected and continued with his career as psychologist instead. From 1947 to 1967 he was professor at the University of Marburg. His research covered themes in Experimental psychology, Neuropsychology, Educational psychology, Personality psychology and Volition.

Düker was awarded with an honorary degree by the University of Düsseldorf in 1975. Three years later he received the Wilhelm Wundt medal by the German society of psychology. Göttingen awarded him with its honorary citizenship in 1985. Düker died in Saarbrücken.
