= Eschershausen-Stadtoldendorf =

Samtgemeinde in Lower Saxony, Germany

- Samtgemeinde
- Location of Eschershausen-Stadtoldendorf within Holzminden district
- Interactive map of Eschershausen-Stadtoldendorf
- Location within Germany Location within Lower Saxony
- Coordinates: 51°54′N 9°39′E
- Country: Germany
- State: Lower Saxony
- District: Holzminden
- Seat: Stadtoldendorf
- Subdivisions: 11 municipalities

Area
  - Total: 132.64 km^{2} (51.21 sq mi)

Population (2025-12-31)
  - Total: 14,144
  - Density: 106.63/km^{2} (276.18/sq mi)
- Time zone: UTC+01:00 (CET)
  - Summer (DST): UTC+02:00 (CEST)
- Website: www.eschershausen-stadtoldendorf.de

Eschershausen-Stadtoldendorf is a Samtgemeinde ("collective municipality") in the district of Holzminden, in Lower Saxony, Germany. Its seat is in the town Stadtoldendorf. It was formed on 1 January 2011 by the merger of the former Samtgemeinden Eschershausen and Stadtoldendorf.

The council of the integrated municipality oversees appointments and dismissals of members of its volunteer fire brigade, which had previously been determined by the individual local fire brigades.

== Municipalities ==
The Samtgemeinde Eschershausen-Stadtoldendorf consists of the following municipalities:

1. Arholzen
2. Deensen
3. Dielmissen
4. Eimen
5. Eschershausen
6. Heinade
7. Holzen
8. Lenne
9. Lüerdissen
10. Stadtoldendorf
11. Wangelnstedt
