= Spüligbach (Ilme) =

River in Germany

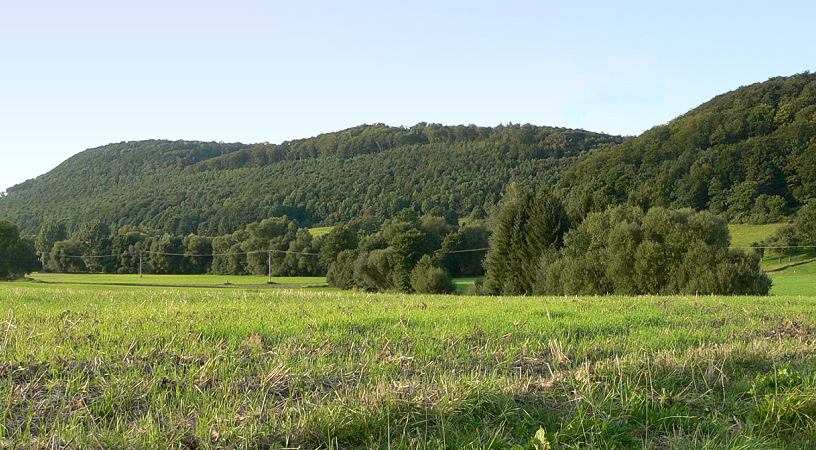
- Valley of the Spüligbach with Amtsberge

Location
- Country: Germany
- State: Lower Saxony

Physical characteristics
- Source
  - location: Near Heinade
  - coordinates: 51.8387°N 9.6237°E
- Mouth
  - location: Near Dassel into the Ilme
  - coordinates: 51.7974°N 9.6993°E

Basin features
- Progression: Ilme→ Leine→ Aller→ Weser→ North Sea

Spüligbach is a river of Lower Saxony, Germany.

The Spüligbach springs near Heinade. It is a left tributary of the Ilme, near Dassel.

== See also ==
- List of rivers of Lower Saxony
