= Eimen =

- Municipality
- Location of Eimen within Holzminden district
- Interactive map of Eimen
- Location within Germany Location within Lower Saxony
- Coordinates: 51°52′35″N 9°46′53″E
- Country: Germany
- State: Lower Saxony
- District: Holzminden
- Municipal assoc.: Eschershausen-Stadtoldendorf

Government
  - Mayor: Werner Allerkamp (SPD)

Area
  - Total: 16.32 km^{2} (6.30 sq mi)
- Elevation: 188 m (617 ft)

Population (2025-12-31)
  - Total: 800
  - Density: 49/km^{2} (130/sq mi)
- Time zone: UTC+01:00 (CET)
  - Summer (DST): UTC+02:00 (CEST)
- Postal codes: 37632
- Dialling codes: 05534, 05565
- Vehicle registration: HOL
- Website: Samtgemeinde

Eimen is a municipality in the district of Holzminden, in Lower Saxony, Germany.
