= Arholzen =

- Municipality
- Coat of arms

- Location of Arholzen within Holzminden district
- Interactive map of Arholzen
- Location within Germany Location within Lower Saxony
- Coordinates: 51°52′04″N 09°34′14″E
- Country: Germany
- State: Lower Saxony
- District: Holzminden
- Municipal assoc.: Eschershausen-Stadtoldendorf

Government
  - Mayor: Karl Dehne (SPD)

Area
  - Total: 5.33 km^{2} (2.06 sq mi)
- Elevation: 229 m (751 ft)

Population (2025-12-31)
  - Total: 327
  - Density: 61.4/km^{2} (159/sq mi)
- Time zone: UTC+01:00 (CET)
  - Summer (DST): UTC+02:00 (CEST)
- Postal codes: 37627
- Dialling codes: 05532
- Vehicle registration: HOL
- Website: www.stadtoldendorf.de

Arholzen is a municipality in the district of Holzminden, in Lower Saxony, Germany.
