= Spüligbach (Lenne) =

River in Germany

Location
- Country: Germany
- State: Lower Saxony

Physical characteristics
- Source
  - location: Southeast of Bremke, a district of Halle
  - coordinates: 52.0255°N 9.5720°E
- Mouth
  - location: At Linse, a district of Bodenwerder, into the Lenne
  - coordinates: 51.9823°N 9.5395°E

Basin features
- Progression: Lenne→ Weser→ North Sea

Spüligbach is a river of Lower Saxony, Germany.

The Spüligbach springs southeast of Bremke, a district of Halle. It is a right tributary of the Lenne at Linse, a district of Bodenwerder.

== See also ==
- List of rivers of Lower Saxony
