= Lüerdissen =

- Municipality
- Location of Lüerdissen within Holzminden district
- Interactive map of Lüerdissen
- Location within Germany Location within Lower Saxony
- Coordinates: 51°57′N 9°37′E
- Country: Germany
- State: Lower Saxony
- District: Holzminden
- Municipal assoc.: Eschershausen-Stadtoldendorf

Government
  - Mayor: Alfred Thies (SPD)

Area
  - Total: 7 km^{2} (2.7 sq mi)
- Elevation: 143 m (469 ft)

Population (2025-12-31)
  - Total: 362
  - Density: 52/km^{2} (130/sq mi)
- Time zone: UTC+01:00 (CET)
  - Summer (DST): UTC+02:00 (CEST)
- Postal codes: 37635
- Dialling codes: 05534
- Vehicle registration: HOL
- Website: www.eschershausen.de

Lüerdissen is a municipality in the district of Holzminden, in Lower Saxony, Germany.
