= Dielmissen =

- Municipality
- Location of Dielmissen within Holzminden district
- Interactive map of Dielmissen
- Location within Germany Location within Lower Saxony
- Coordinates: 51°58′N 9°37′E
- Country: Germany
- State: Lower Saxony
- District: Holzminden
- Municipal assoc.: Eschershausen-Stadtoldendorf

Government
  - Mayor: Theo Krause (CDU)

Area
  - Total: 7.47 km^{2} (2.88 sq mi)
- Elevation: 140 m (460 ft)

Population (2025-12-31)
  - Total: 732
  - Density: 98.0/km^{2} (254/sq mi)
- Time zone: UTC+01:00 (CET)
  - Summer (DST): UTC+02:00 (CEST)
- Postal codes: 37633
- Dialling codes: 05534
- Vehicle registration: HOL

Dielmissen is a municipality in the district of Holzminden, in Lower Saxony, Germany.
