= Lenne, Lower Saxony =

Lenne
- Municipality
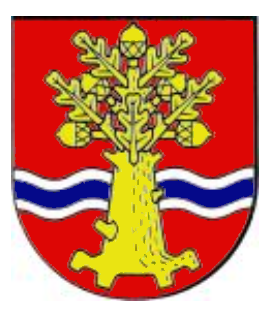
- Coat of arms

- Location of Lenne within Holzminden district
- Interactive map of Lenne
- Location within Germany Location within Lower Saxony
- Coordinates: 51°54′N 09°41′E
- Country: Germany
- State: Lower Saxony
- District: Holzminden
- Municipal assoc.: Eschershausen-Stadtoldendorf

Government
  - Mayor: Hans-Dieter Steenbock

Area
  - Total: 5.68 km^{2} (2.19 sq mi)
- Elevation: 231 m (758 ft)

Population (2025-12-31)
  - Total: 629
  - Density: 111/km^{2} (287/sq mi)
- Time zone: UTC+01:00 (CET)
  - Summer (DST): UTC+02:00 (CEST)
- Postal codes: 37627
- Dialling codes: 05532
- Vehicle registration: HOL

Lenne (German pronunciation: [ˈlɛnə]) is a municipality in the district of Holzminden, in Lower Saxony, Germany.
