= Hunnesrück Castle =

Hilltop castle in Lower Saxony, Germany

- Burg Hunnesrück
- Amtsberge near Dassel
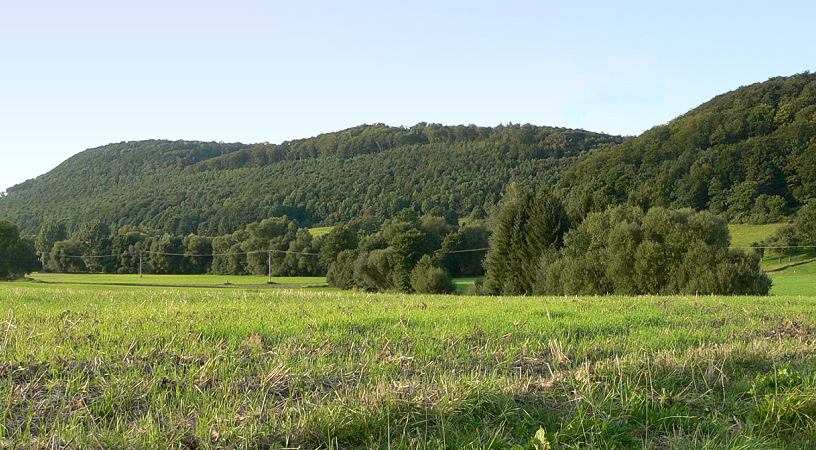
- The Amtsberge hills near Dassel with the castle ruins on the centre summit

Site information
- Type: hill castle
- Code: DE-NI
- Condition: moat, wall and rampart remains

Location
- Coordinates: 51.82111°N 9.6825°E
- Height: 317 m above sea level (NN)

Site history
- Built: first mentioned in 1310

Hunnesrück Castle (German: Burg Hunnesrück) was a hilltop castle built in the 13th century. Its ruins are located in the Amtsberge hills near Dassel in the district of Northeim in south Lower Saxony in Germany.

The castle was constructed in the 13th century and destroyed in 1521 during the Hildesheim Diocesan Feud. Only parts of the moats, walls and ramparts remain.

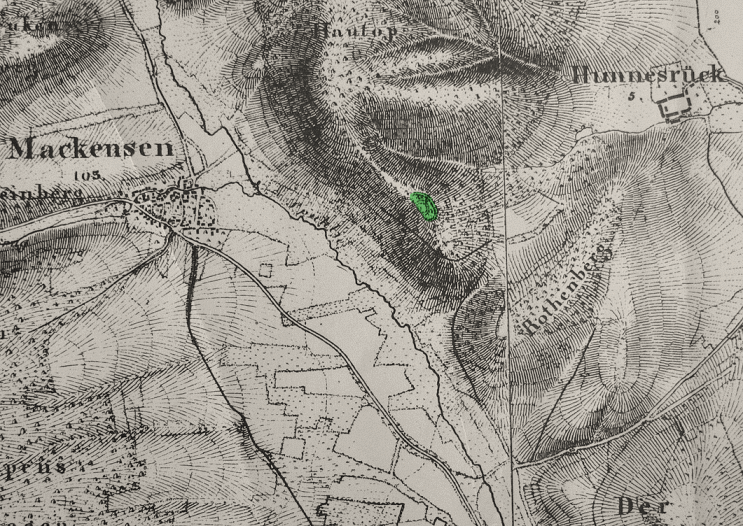
Castle ruins (green) between Mackensen and Gut Hunnesrück

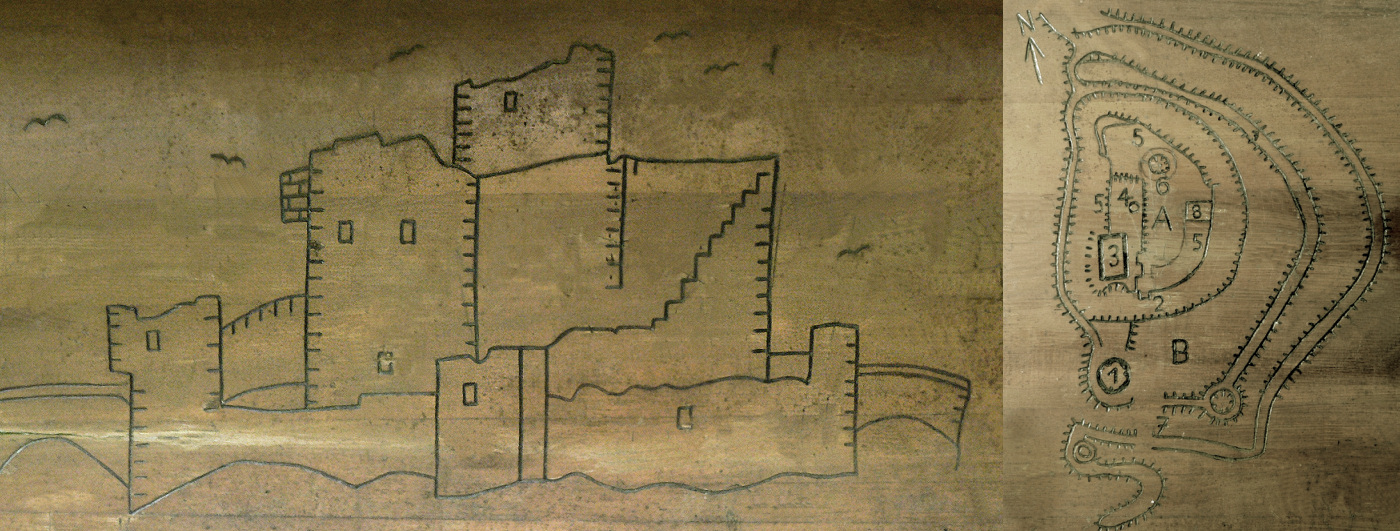
Hunnesrück ruins (enlarged copy of a drawing by Krabbe from 1603) and site plan

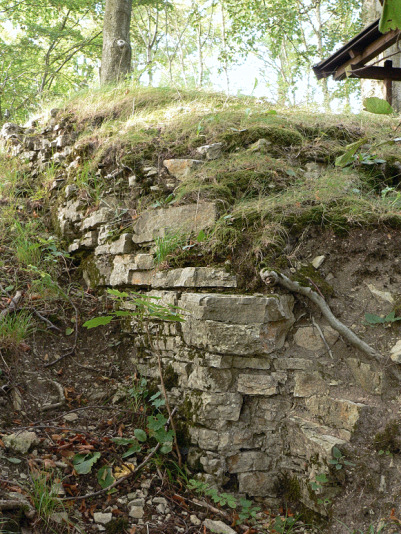
Remains of the castle walls
