= Deensen =

- Municipality
- Coat of arms

- Location of Deensen within Holzminden district
- Interactive map of Deensen
- Location within Germany Location within Lower Saxony
- Coordinates: 51°52′N 9°34′E
- Country: Germany
- State: Lower Saxony
- District: Holzminden
- Municipal assoc.: Eschershausen-Stadtoldendorf
- Subdivisions: 3

Government
  - Mayor: Hans-Dieter Ullmann (SPD)

Area
  - Total: 11.02 km^{2} (4.25 sq mi)
- Elevation: 258 m (846 ft)

Population (2025-12-31)
  - Total: 1,304
  - Density: 118.3/km^{2} (306.5/sq mi)
- Time zone: UTC+01:00 (CET)
  - Summer (DST): UTC+02:00 (CEST)
- Postal codes: 37627
- Dialling codes: 05532
- Vehicle registration: HOL

Deensen is a municipality in the district of Holzminden, in Lower Saxony, Germany.

The internationally well known sculptor Ursula von Rydingsvard was born there.
