= Dassel =

- Town
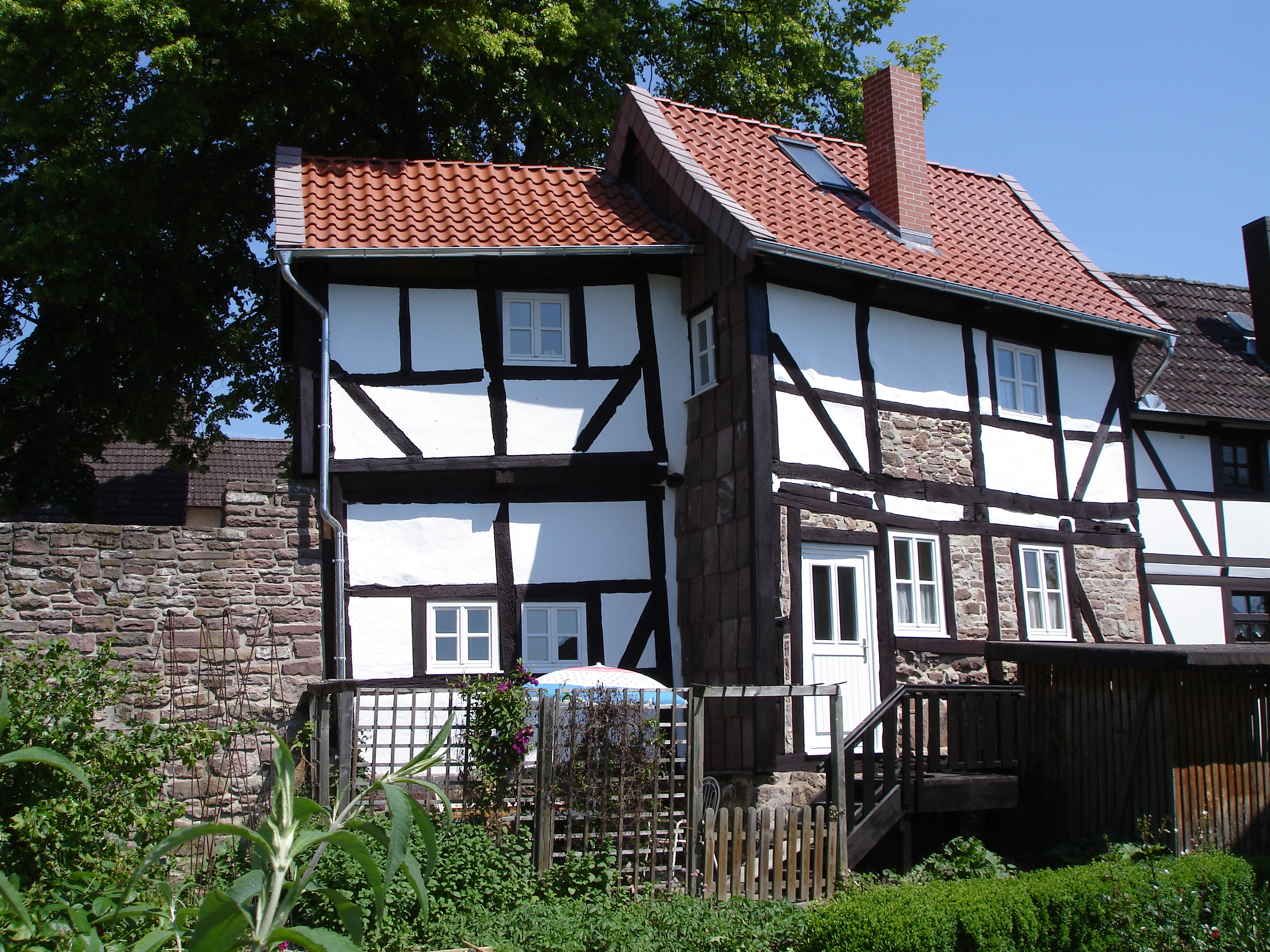
- Medieval wall and timbered houses in Dassel

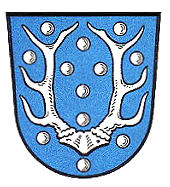
- Flag Coat of arms

- Location of Dassel within Northeim district
- Interactive map of Dassel
- Location within Germany Location within Lower Saxony
- Coordinates: 51°48′12″N 9°41′25″E
- Country: Germany
- State: Lower Saxony
- District: Northeim
- Subdivisions: 18 districts

Government
  - Mayor (2021–26): Sven Wolter (Ind.)

Area
  - Total: 113.24 km^{2} (43.72 sq mi)
- Elevation: 160 m (520 ft)

Population (2025-12-31)
  - Total: 9,034
  - Density: 79.78/km^{2} (206.6/sq mi)
- Time zone: UTC+01:00 (CET)
  - Summer (DST): UTC+02:00 (CEST)
- Postal codes: 37586
- Dialling codes: 05562, 05564
- Vehicle registration: NOM
- Website: www.stadt-dassel.de

Dassel (German pronunciation: [ˈdasl̩]) is a town in southern Lower Saxony, Germany, located in the district Northeim. It is located near the hills of the Solling mountains.

== Geography ==
The city covers an area of 43.64 square miles (113.0 km^{2}). Buildings and streets make up about 10% of this area while 26% are covered with forests like Ellensen Forest and 62% are in agricultural usage, especially for cereals and rapeseed cultivation. For this, the local soil horizon provides suitable conditions as sediments below the soil layer are made up of loess. Dassel is located in the temperate climate zone.

== History ==
Dassel dates back to the year 860 when it was mentioned in a deed of the Imperial Abbey of Corvey. In 1022, Henry II, Holy Roman Emperor, in another deed referred to Dassel church. By about 1113, Dassel became a base of the counts of Dassel, whose name is derived from the name of the settlement. As the county of Dassel ceased to exist in 1310, Dassel was sold to Siegfried II, bishop of the diocese of Hildesheim. Shortly thereafter, in 1315, he provided his acquisition with town rights because the surrounding region belonged to the principality of Brunswick-Wolfenbüttel, thus to enemies of the bishop of Hildesheim. Once given town rights, inhabitants of Dassel built a defensive wall. Town administration operated from Hunnesrück Castle, on a nearby hill. That caste was occupied by the dukes of Brunswick-Wolfenbüttel as a result of the Hildesheim Diocesan Feud in 1521. Duke Eric I ordered to tear down Hunnesrück castle and had the Erichsburg castle built instead. Dassel was administrated from there until 1643. As a result of the Thirty Years' War, Dassel was merged with the diocese of Hildesheim in 1643. The bishops had new administration buildings built in a place called Hunnesrück, situated between the destroyed Hunnesrück castle and the Erichsburg. Throughout those centuries, these circumstances restrained Dassel from proper development and it was thus overcome by the neighboring city of Einbeck that was founded later than Dassel. In addition, parts of the city were destroyed in fires in the 19th century. In that time, some inhabitants started to weave linen or to trade with it, while others emigrated to USA. At the beginning of the 20th century Dassel had 1462 inhabitants. Around 1920 the number of inhabitants amounted to 1601. During World War II the town remained undamaged. Therefore, several expellees settled in Dassel. On March 1, 1974, Dassel was merged with several other small municipalities of the Ilme valley. The new borough now covers the area of the historic County of Dassel, which ceased to exist in 1310. On 15 April 2010 Dassel and its incorporated villages had 11434 inhabitants of whom 2597 lived in the historic town of Dassel itself.

== Main Sights ==
- St. Laurence's Church from 1447, a gothic building with Renaissance time mural.
- Catholic St. Michael's Church, built in a classicist style in 1847, is sightworthy because of several masterpieces of art, e.g. a baroque altar and a baptismal font dating from 1700.
- Old Town Hall at the Market Place, built in 1817. Opposite there is a sightworthy old mill (Stadtmühle) founded in 1558 and built of reddish sandstone. It was used as a mill until 1969.
- Medieval wall surrounding the old town center. Close to the new town hall, which was built in the 1970s outside the historic center, a sightworthy gothic arch can be seen. Next to it the house "An der Stadtmauer 4" includes the last tower of the medieval wall, the Baldertower
- Dassel has many well-preserved half-timbered houses, e.g. in Neue Strasse and Obere Strasse streets.
- Former Jewish Cemetery on Sievershaeuser Strasse road. About 20 well-preserved gravestones can be seen. Some of them have Hebrew inscriptions.
- Former train station, a half-timbered building constructed at the end of the 19th century. When the railway line was closed, it was transformed into a residential building.
- Forge Blankschmiede, dating from 1727 and renovated 1988-93. Now it is a museum. Teichplatz 2.
- Museum of the County of Dassel (Museum der Grafschaft Dassel), Teichplatz 1.

== Education ==
The Gymnasium (college preparatory school) in Dassel is named after Paul Gerhardt. The other general schools are two primary schools (elementary schools), and a secondary school (Realschule), which is named after Rainald von Dassel.

== Notable people ==
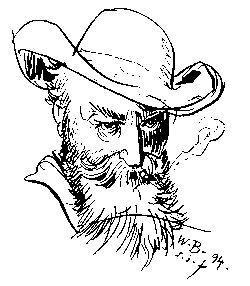
Wilhelm Busch 1894

- Rainald of Dassel, (1120-1167), archbishop
- Carl Busse (1772-1829), in the first decades of the 19th century was a pastor in various northern German towns and wrote during this time numerous theological treatises.
- Wilhelm Busch (1832-1908), the humorous poet lived intermittently from 1846 to 1897 in the district Lüthorst
- Heinrich Düker (1898-1986), 1946-1947 mayor of Göttingen, psychologist

== Transportation ==
Dassel was the endpoint of a private railway line from Einbeck since 1883. Its length amounted to 13.1 km. In 1975, the line was closed for passenger transport, and in 2003 for goods as well. Afterwards the railway line was replaced by a bus line. The former train station which was transformed into a residential building is well preserved.

Dassel is easily accessible by bus from the neighbouring towns of Einbeck and Stadtoldendorf.

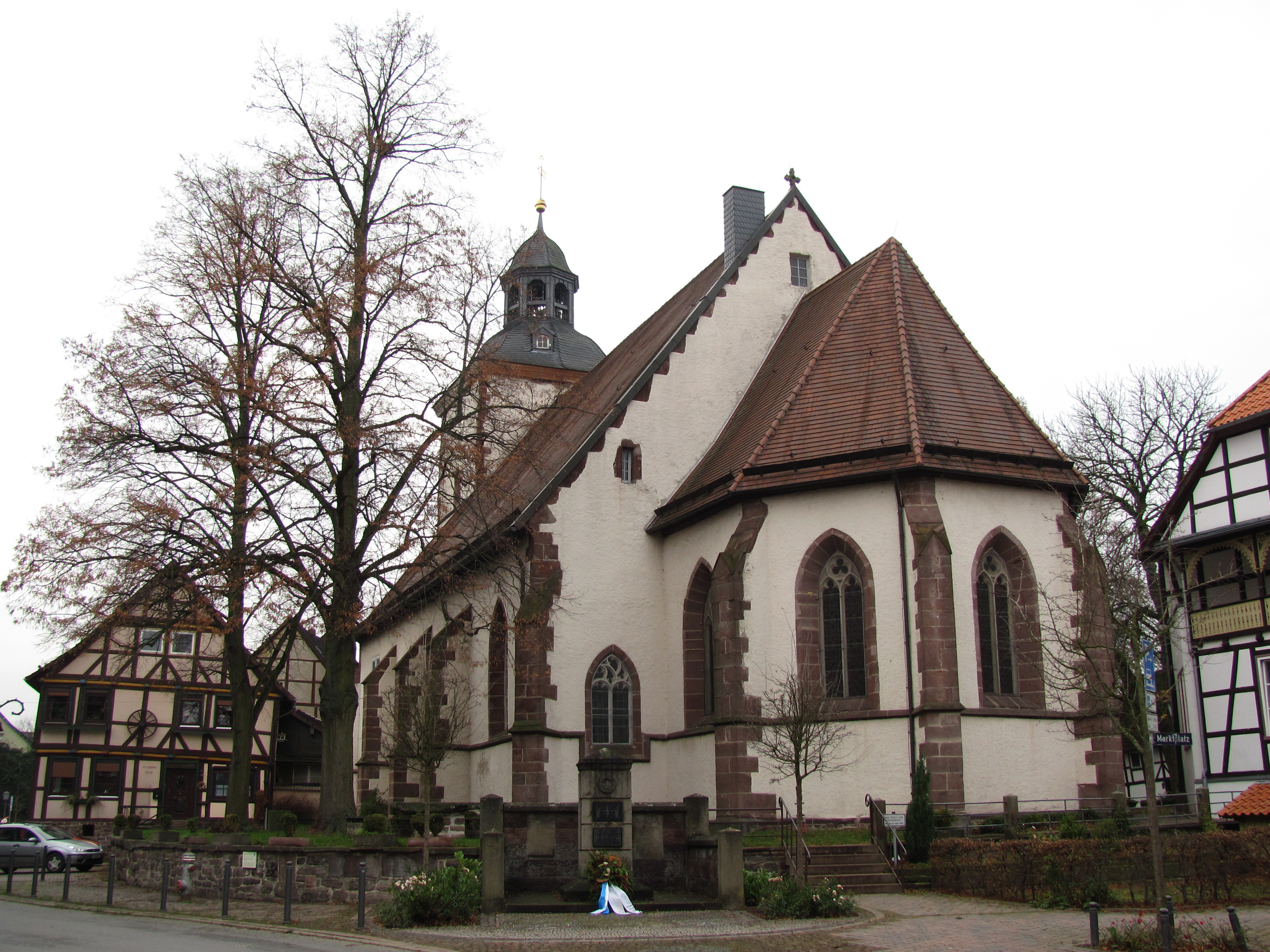
St. Lawrence Church.

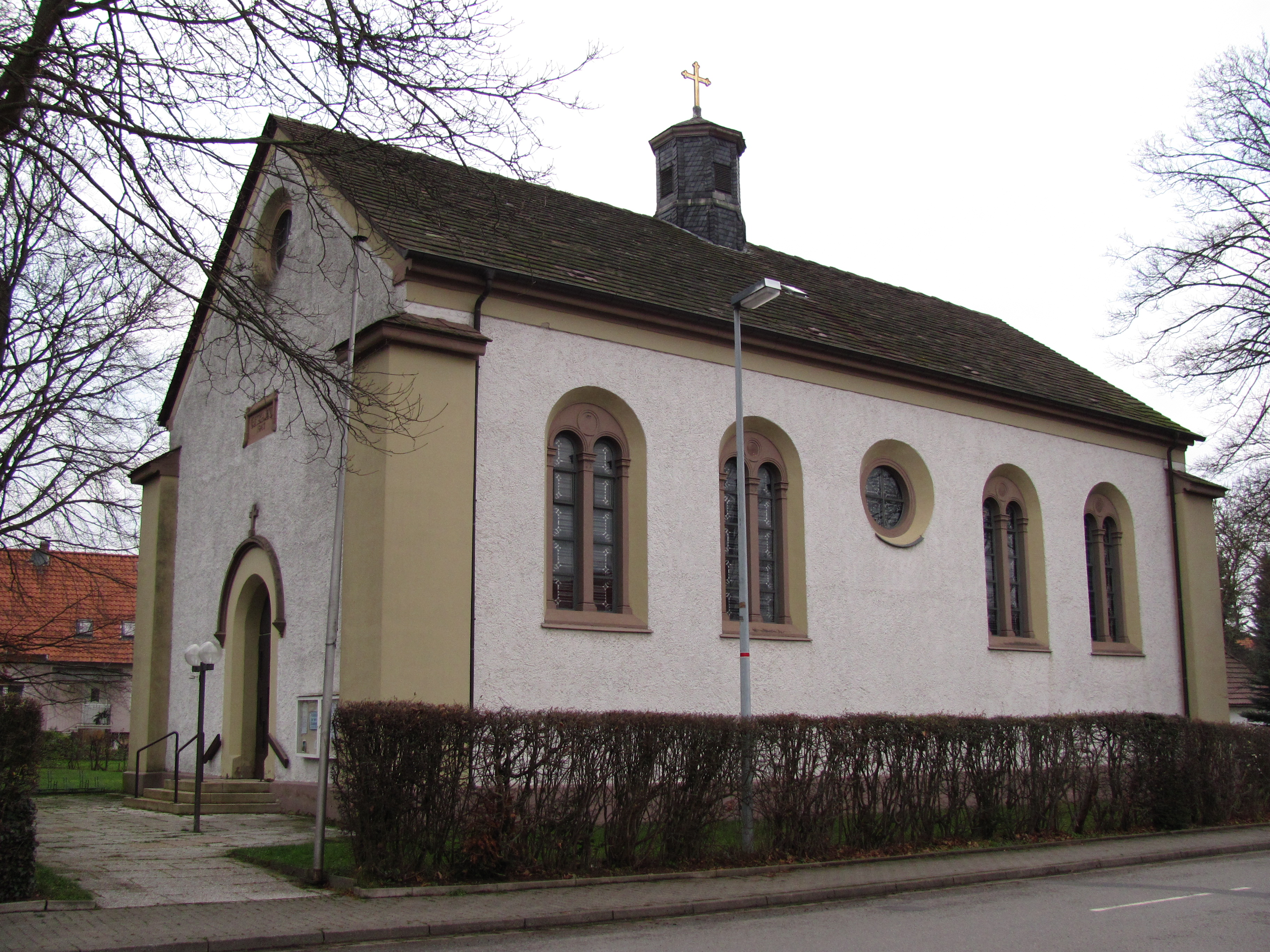
St. Michael's Church.

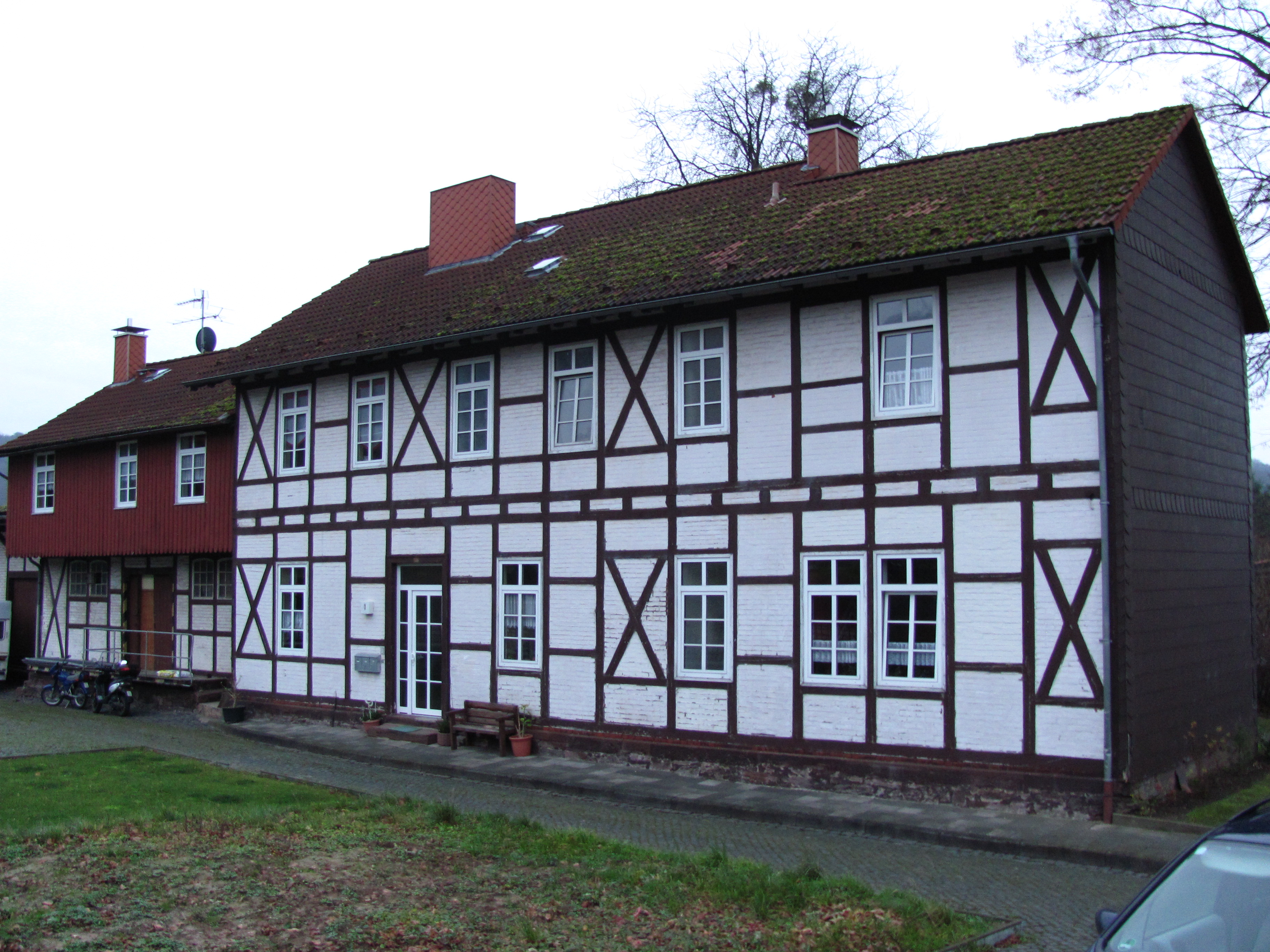
Former train station of Dassel.

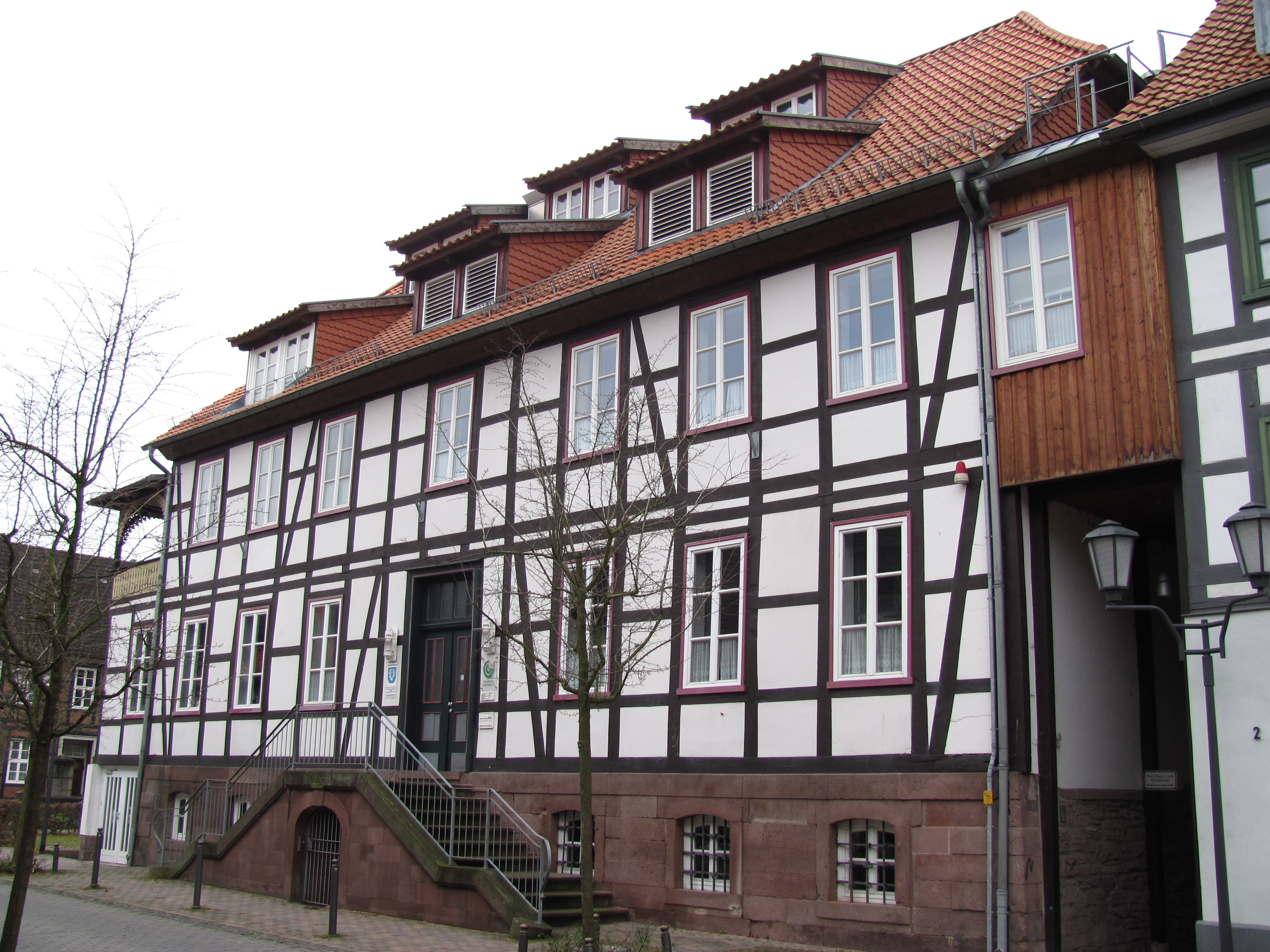
Old Town Hall.

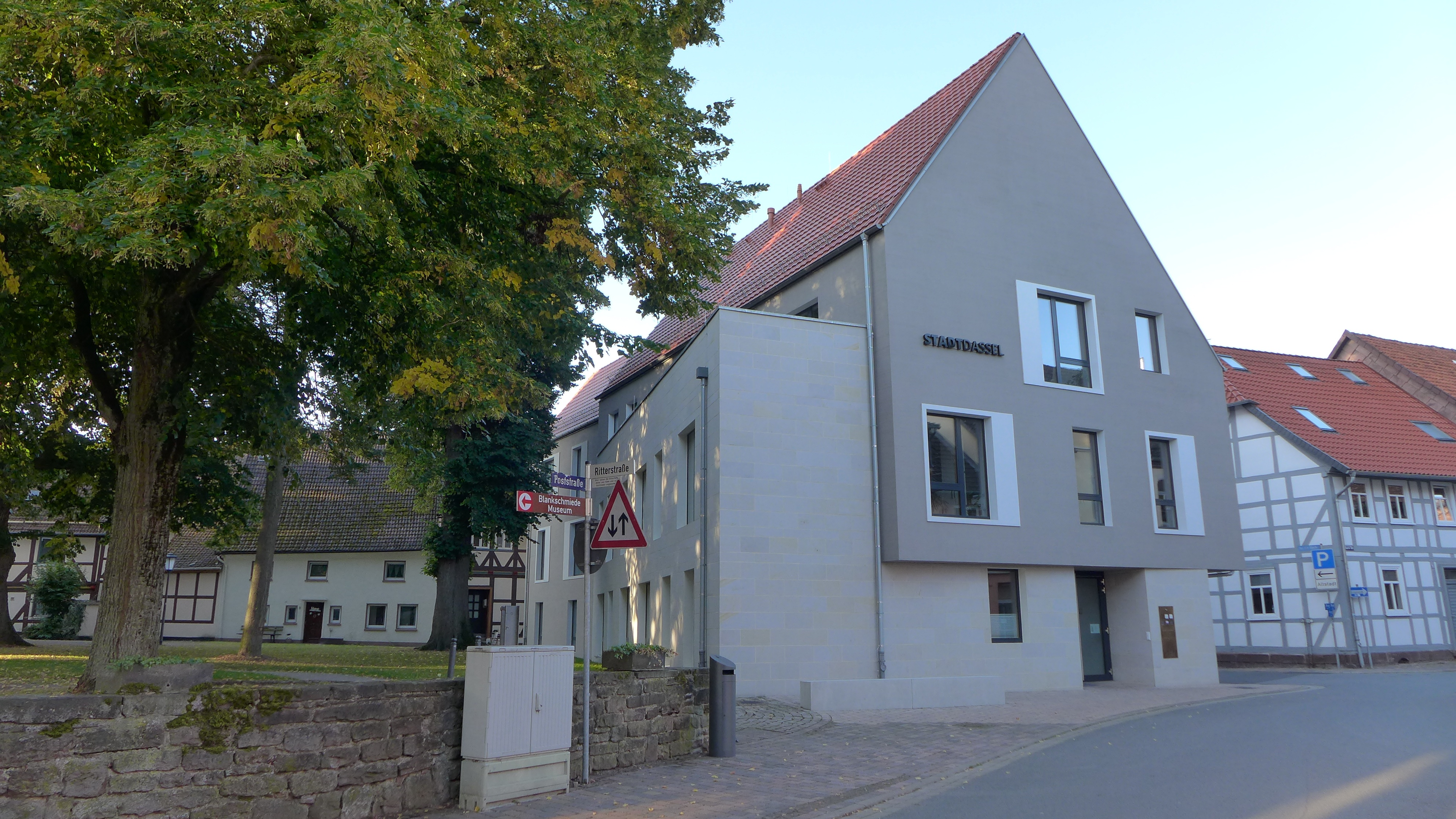
Current Town Hall.

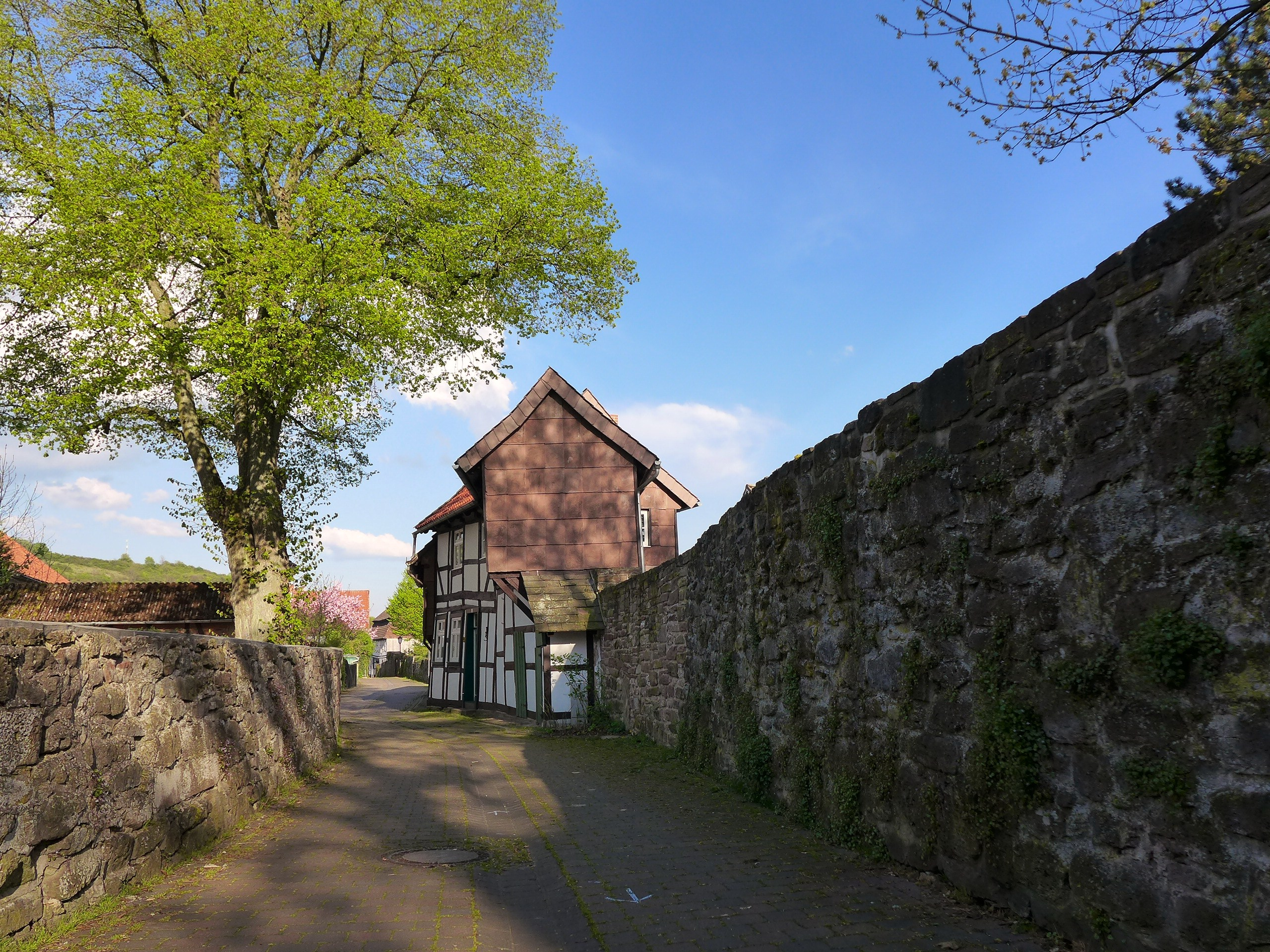
Medieval wall surrounding the old center.

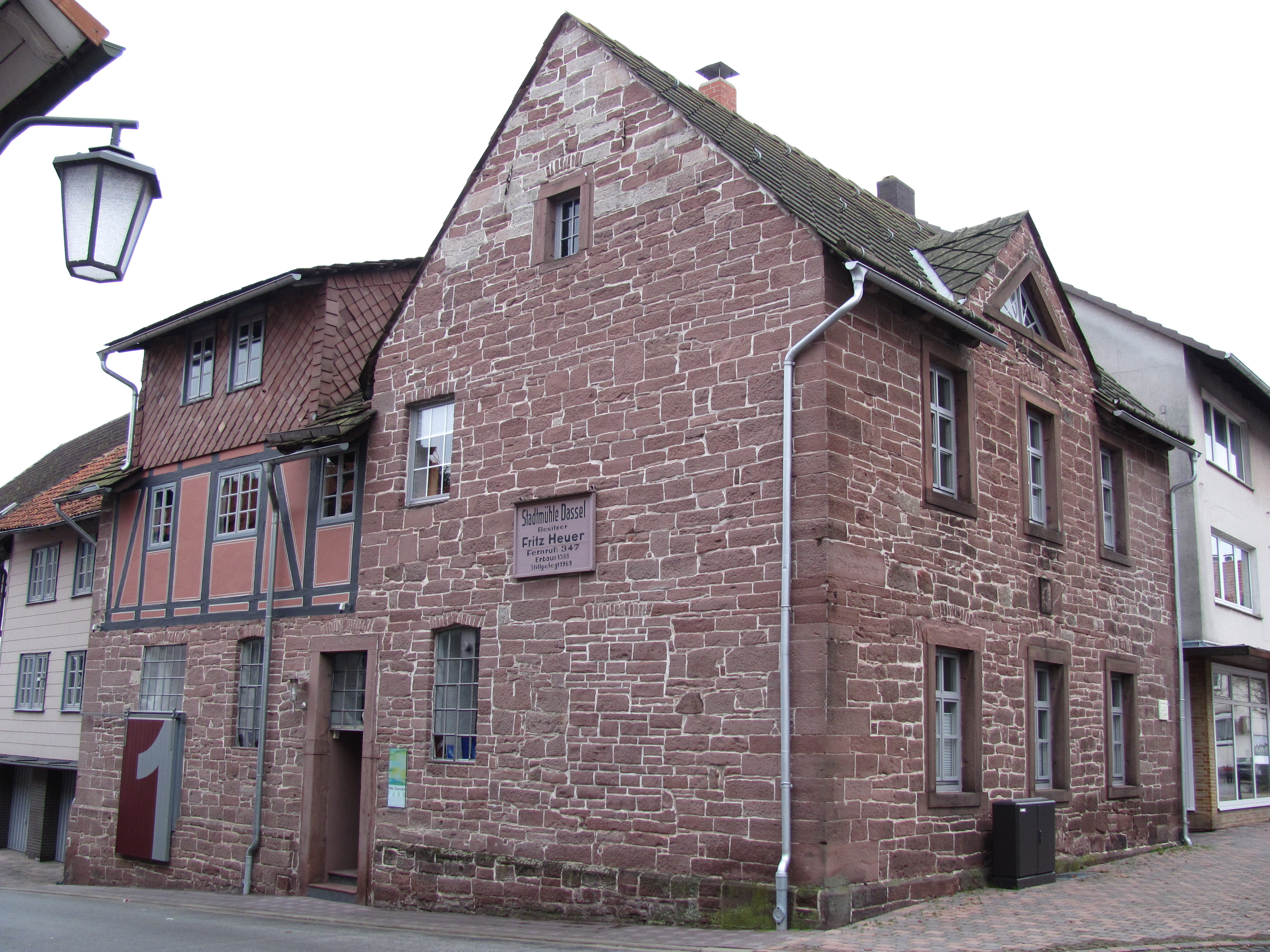
Former Mill.

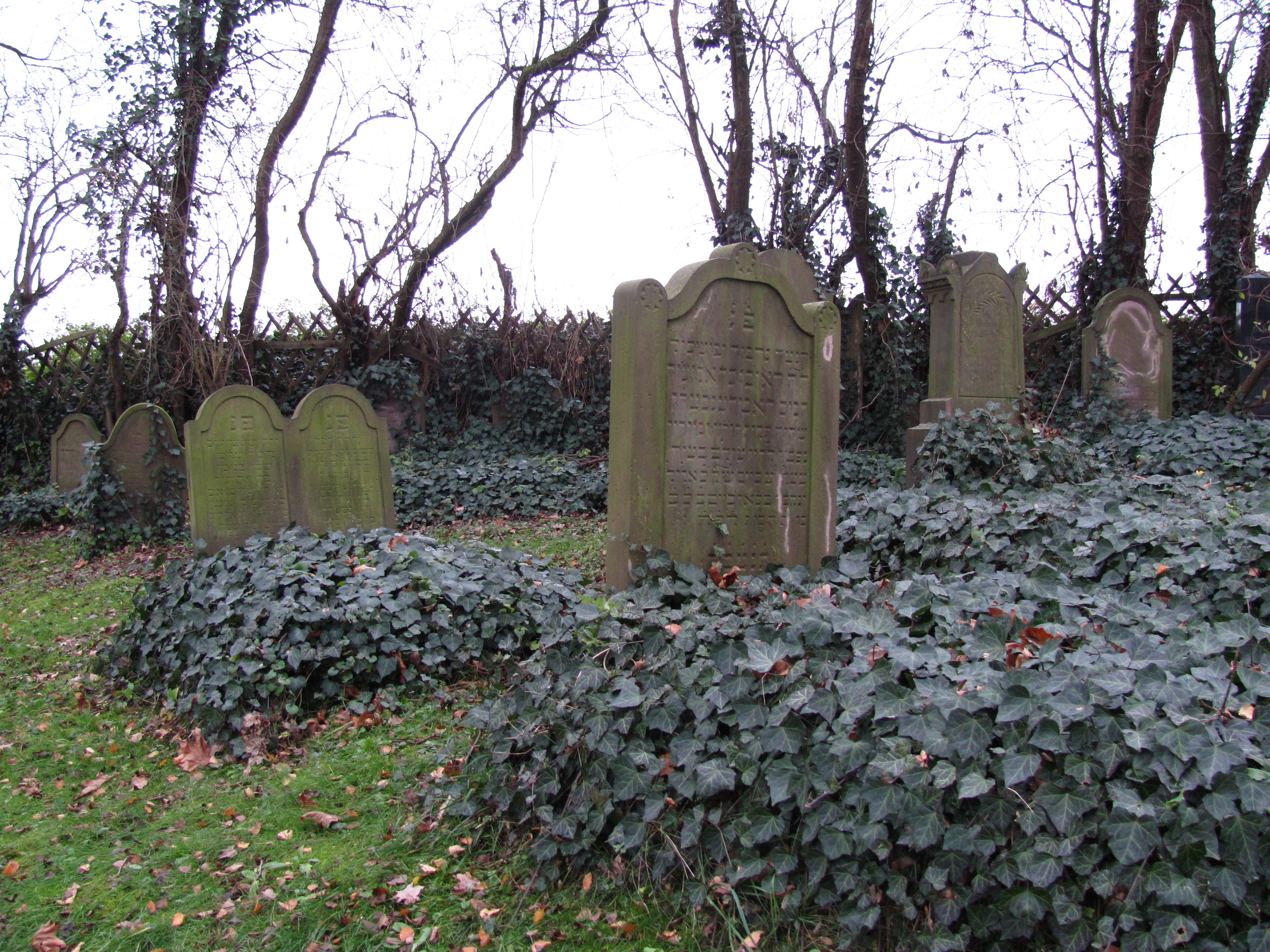
Jewish Cemetery.
