= Eschershausen =

- Town
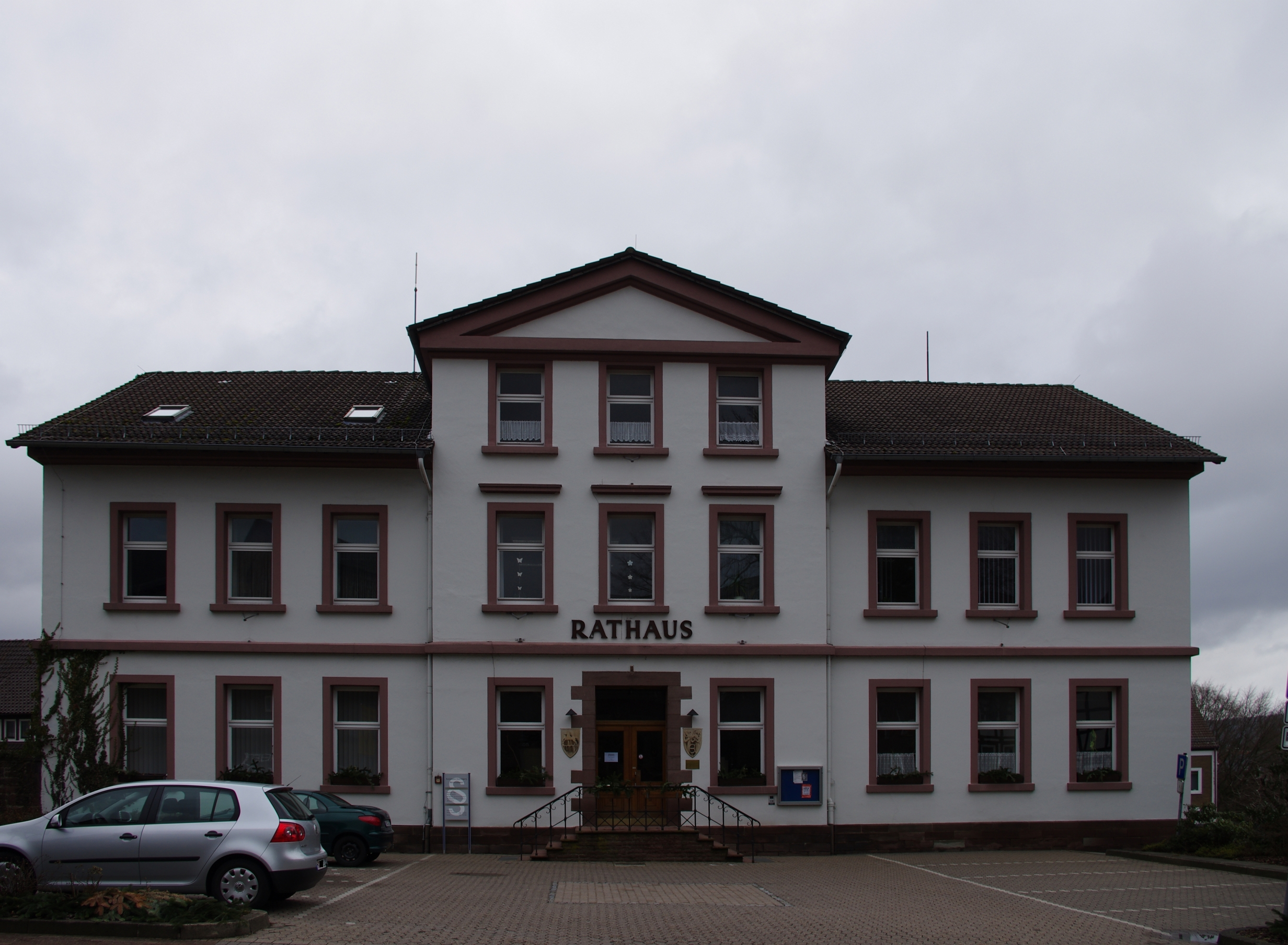
- Town hall

- Flag Coat of arms

- Location of Eschershausen within Holzminden district
- Interactive map of Eschershausen
- Location within Germany Location within Lower Saxony
- Coordinates: 51°55′N 09°39′E
- Country: Germany
- State: Lower Saxony
- District: Holzminden
- Municipal assoc.: Eschershausen-Stadtoldendorf
- Subdivisions: 3

Government
  - Mayor: Andreas Fischer

Area
  - Total: 23.92 km^{2} (9.24 sq mi)
- Elevation: 199 m (653 ft)

Population (2025-12-31)
  - Total: 3,332
  - Density: 139.3/km^{2} (360.8/sq mi)
- Time zone: UTC+01:00 (CET)
  - Summer (DST): UTC+02:00 (CEST)
- Postal codes: 37632
- Dialling codes: 05534
- Vehicle registration: HOL

Eschershausen (German pronunciation: [ɛʃɐsˈhaʊzn̩]) is a municipality in the district of Holzminden, in Lower Saxony, Germany. It is situated approximately 20 km northeast of Holzminden, and 50 km south of Hanover.

Eschershausen was the seat of the former Samtgemeinde ("collective municipality") Eschershausen.

== Personalities ==
=== Honorary citizen ===
- Wilhelm Raabe (1831-1910), German writer, honorary citizenship in 1901
- Hans Scheibert (1887-1969), founder of the Deutsche Schlauchbootfabrik (Dinghy factory), (DSB), honorary citizenship in 1967

=== Sons and daughters of the city ===
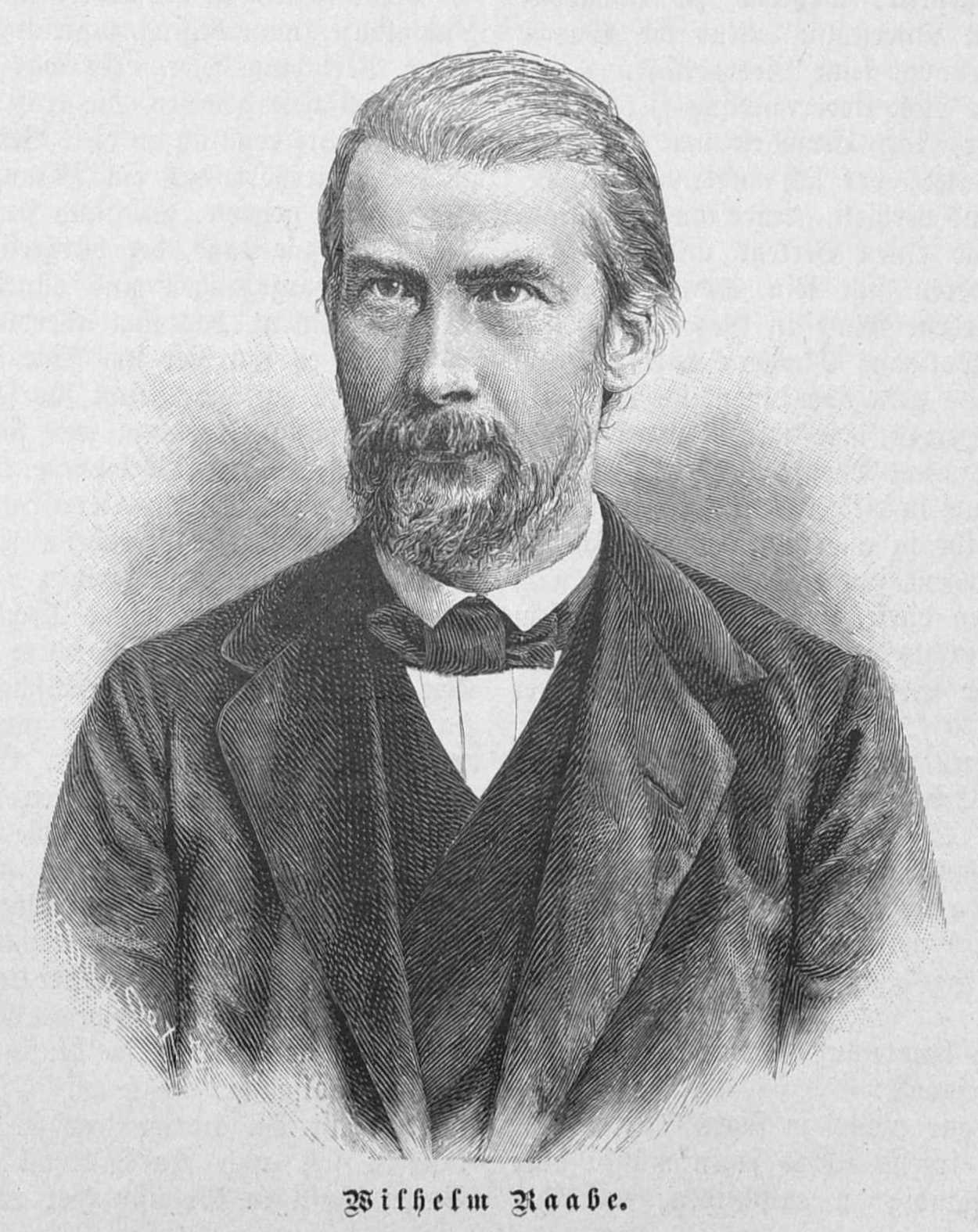
Wilhelm Raabe 1888

- Wilhelm Raabe (1831-1910), German writer
- Georg Bode (1838-1910), German jurist, naturalist and historian
