= Wangelnstedt =

- Municipality
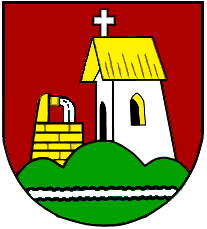
- Coat of arms

- Location of Wangelnstedt within Holzminden district
- Interactive map of Wangelnstedt
- Location within Germany Location within Lower Saxony
- Coordinates: 51°52′N 9°41′E
- Country: Germany
- State: Lower Saxony
- District: Holzminden
- Municipal assoc.: Eschershausen-Stadtoldendorf

Government
  - Mayor: Manfred Adam

Area
  - Total: 15.15 km^{2} (5.85 sq mi)
- Elevation: 260 m (850 ft)

Population (2025-12-31)
  - Total: 509
  - Density: 33.6/km^{2} (87.0/sq mi)
- Time zone: UTC+01:00 (CET)
  - Summer (DST): UTC+02:00 (CEST)
- Postal codes: 37627
- Dialling codes: 05532
- Vehicle registration: HOL
- Website: www.stadtoldendorf.de

Wangelnstedt is a municipality in the district of Holzminden, in Lower Saxony, Germany.
