= Heinade =

- Municipality
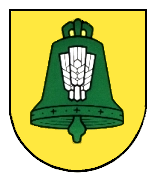
- Coat of arms

- Location of Heinade within Holzminden district
- Interactive map of Heinade
- Location within Germany Location within Lower Saxony
- Coordinates: 51°50′N 09°38′E
- Country: Germany
- State: Lower Saxony
- District: Holzminden
- Municipal assoc.: Eschershausen-Stadtoldendorf
- Subdivisions: 3

Government
  - Mayor: Heinrich Schoppe

Area
  - Total: 9.07 km^{2} (3.50 sq mi)
- Elevation: 303 m (994 ft)

Population (2025-12-31)
  - Total: 789
  - Density: 87.0/km^{2} (225/sq mi)
- Time zone: UTC+01:00 (CET)
  - Summer (DST): UTC+02:00 (CEST)
- Postal codes: 37627
- Dialling codes: 05532 Heinade 05564 Hellental and Merxhausen
- Vehicle registration: HOL

Heinade is a municipality in the district of Holzminden, in Lower Saxony, Germany.
