= Stadtoldendorf =

- Town
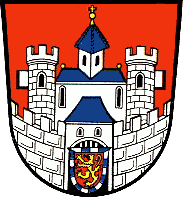
- Coat of arms

- Location of Stadtoldendorf within Holzminden district
- Interactive map of Stadtoldendorf
- Location within Germany Location within Lower Saxony
- Coordinates: 51°53′N 9°37′E
- Country: Germany
- State: Lower Saxony
- District: Holzminden
- Municipal assoc.: Eschershausen-Stadtoldendorf

Government
  - Mayor: Helmut Affelt

Area
  - Total: 24.92 km^{2} (9.62 sq mi)
- Elevation: 221 m (725 ft)

Population (2025-12-31)
  - Total: 4,885
  - Density: 196.0/km^{2} (507.7/sq mi)
- Time zone: UTC+01:00 (CET)
  - Summer (DST): UTC+02:00 (CEST)
- Postal codes: 37627
- Dialling codes: 05532
- Vehicle registration: HOL
- Website: www.stadtoldendorf.de

Stadtoldendorf (German pronunciation: [ˌʃtatˈʔɔldn̩dɔʁf]) is a town in the center of the Holzminden district, Lower Saxony, Germany. Stadtoldendorf is the seat of the Samtgemeinde ("collective municipality") Eschershausen-Stadtoldendorf.

== Government ==
Allocation of seats in the local council electoral period 2006-2011:

- CDU: 10
- SPD: 5
- Grünen: 1
- FDP: 1

== Culture ==
=== Museums ===
- Stadtmuseum im Charlotte-Leitzen-Haus
- Freilichtmuseum Mühlenanger

=== Buildings ===
- Försterbergturm, from the 13th century
- Hagentorturm
- Kellbergturm
- Homburg castle, above old village
- Altes Rathaus (from 1875)
- Ratskeller (from 1621)
- Charlotte-Leitzen-Haus

== Notable people ==
- Kurt Matzdorf (1922 – 2008), metalsmith, professor
