= Christian monasticism =

Christian religious way of life

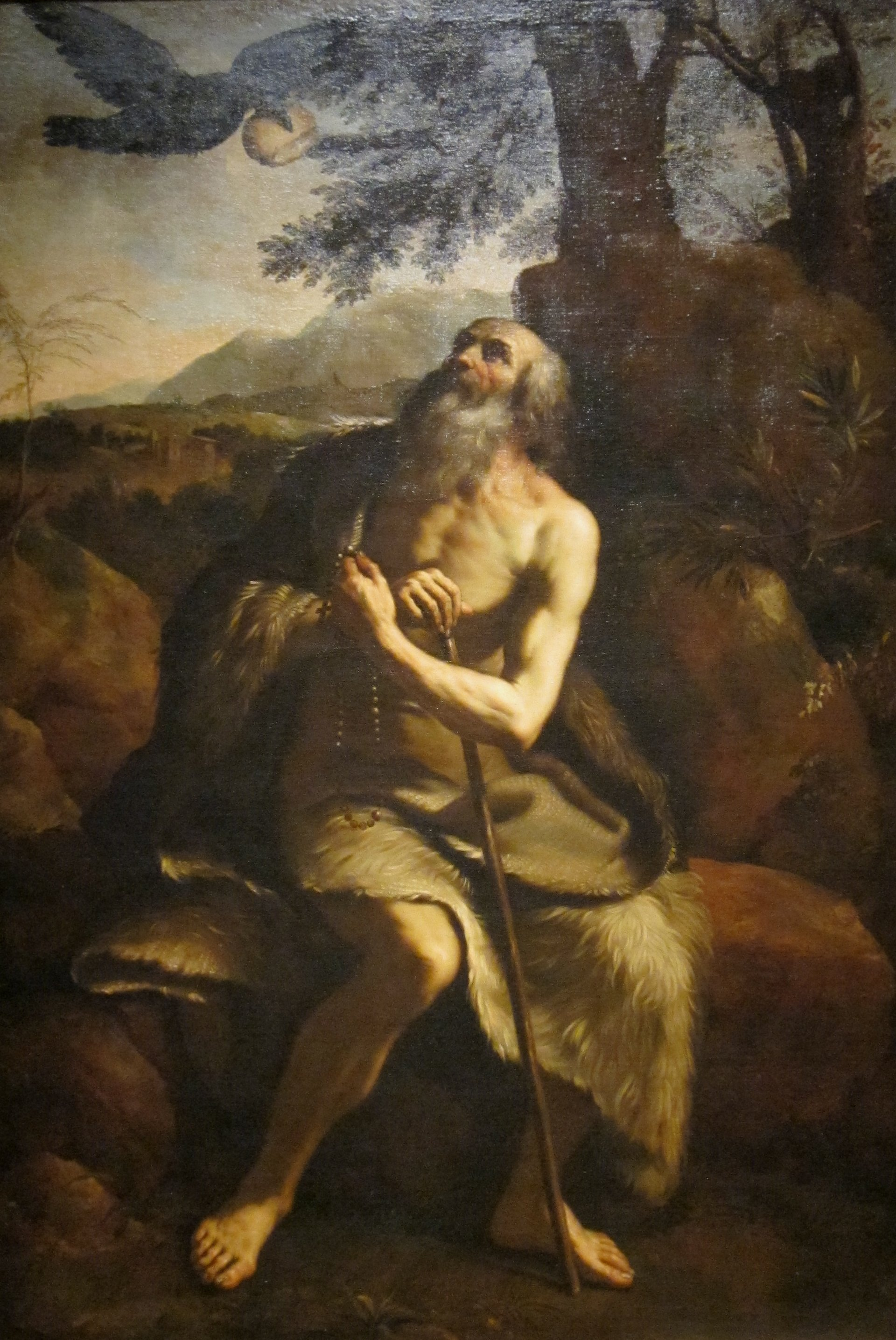
St. Paul the Hermit Fed by the Raven, after Il Guercino (17th century), Dayton Art Institute

Christian monasticism is a religious way of life of Christians who live ascetic and typically cloistered lives that are dedicated to Christian worship. It began to develop early in the history of the Christian Church, modeled upon scriptural examples and ideals, including those in the Old Testament. It has come to be regulated by religious rules (e. g., the Rule of Saint Augustine, Anthony the Great, St Pachomius, the Rule of St Basil, the Rule of St Benedict) and, in modern times, the Canon law of the respective Christian denominations that have forms of monastic living. Those living the monastic life are known by the generic terms monks (men) and nuns (women). The word monk originated from the Greek μοναχός (monachos, 'monk'), itself from μόνος (monos) meaning 'alone'.

Christian monks did not live in monasteries at first; rather, they began by living alone as solitaries, as the word monos might suggest. As more people took on the lives of monks, living alone in the wilderness, they started to come together and model themselves after the original monks nearby. Quickly, the monks formed communities to further their ability to observe an ascetic life. According to Christianity historian Robert Louis Wilken, "By creating an alternate social structure within the Church they laid the foundations for one of the most enduring Christian institutions..." Monastics generally dwell in a monastery, whether they live there in a community (cenobites), or in seclusion (recluses).

== Life for monks and nuns ==
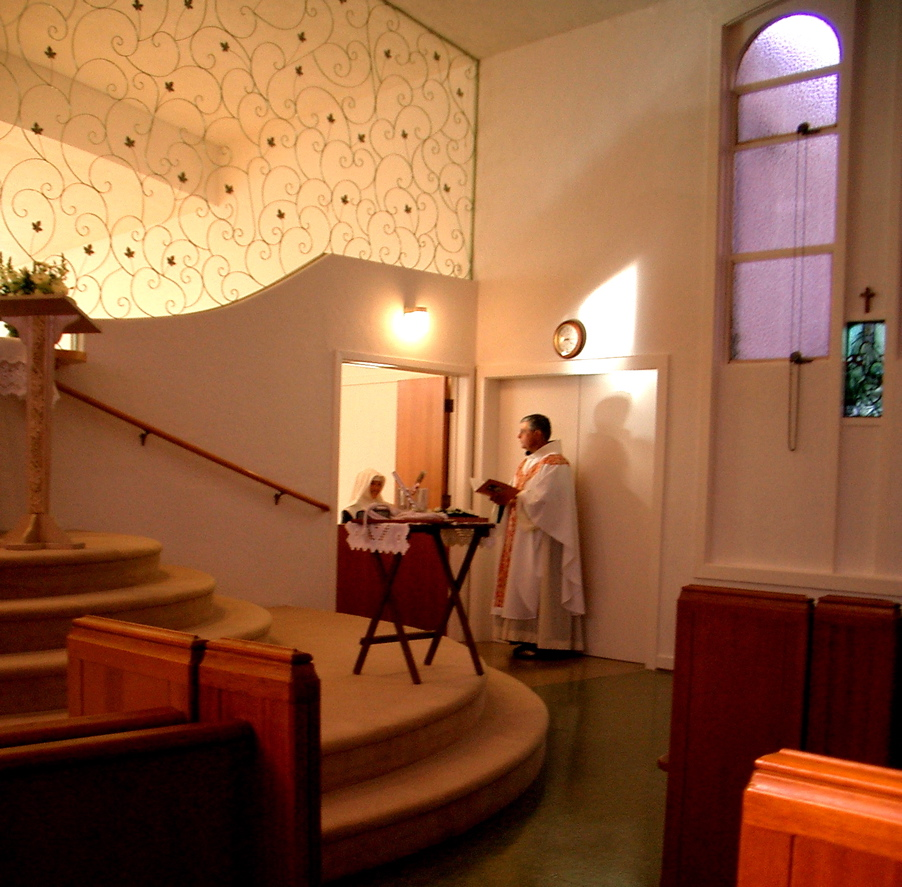
Nun profession ceremony for a new nun, admitted to the cloister (behind the half door)

Monasticism, in all its varieties, involves withdrawal from society. Monastic life is distinct from the "religious orders" such as the friars, canons regular, clerks regular, and the more recent religious congregations. The latter involves a special work or aim, such as preaching, teaching, liberating captives, etc., which occupies a large place in their activities. While monks have variously labored, in every case this work is extrinsic to the essence of the monastic state. Monks and friars are two distinct roles. In the thirteenth century, mendicant orders such as the Franciscans and Dominicans developed as new forms of religious life centered on poverty, urban ministry, preaching, and teaching.

Both ways of living out the Christian life are regulated by the respective church law of those Christian denominations that recognize it (e.g., the Catholic Church, the Eastern Orthodox Church, the Anglican Church, or the Lutheran Church). Christian monastic life does not always involve communal living with like-minded Christians. Christian monasticism has varied greatly in its external forms, but, broadly speaking, it has two main types: (a) the eremitical or solitary, (b) the cenobitical or communal. St. Anthony the Abbot may be called the founder of the first and St. Pachomius of the second. The monastic life has been associated with Jesus's teaching to "be perfect, therefore, as your heavenly Father is perfect" (Matthew 5:48). This ideal can be seen, for example, in the Philokalia, a book of monastic writings. Their manner of self-renunciation has three elements corresponding to the three evangelical counsels: poverty, chastity and obedience.

A priest-monk is sometimes called a hieromonk.

== History ==
=== Biblical precedent ===
First-century groups such as the Essenes and the Therapeutae followed lifestyles that could be seen as precursors to Christian monasticism. Early Christian monasticism drew its inspiration from the examples of the Prophet Elijah and John the Baptist, who both lived alone in the desert, and above all from the story of Jesus' time in solitary struggle with Satan in the desert, before his public ministry. Another monastic precedent in Bible would be Nazirites as they practiced tonsure, followed a certain diet as a form of fasting, lived consecrated lives and they followed a certain practice concerning hygiene. However, the case of Nazirites is usually defined as a form of a historical Jewish vow or oath instead of being a direct precedent of monastic orders because of the historical context concerning Israelites and the importance of private rituals concerning vow making in historical Israelite religion.

=== Early Christianity ===
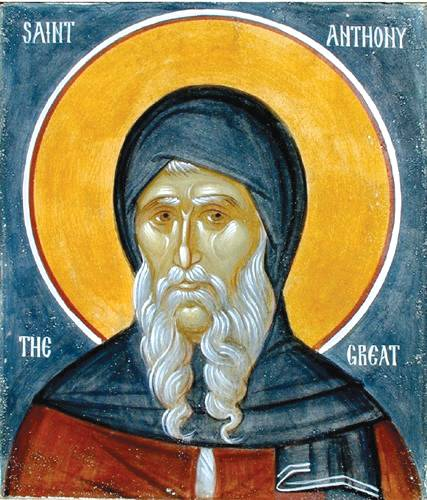
Icon of Saint Anthony the Great, an early, well-known Christian monastic

Early Christian ascetics have left few confirmed archaeological traces and only hints in the written record. Communities of virgins who had consecrated themselves to Christ are found at least as far back as the 2nd century. There were also individual ascetics, known as the "devout", who usually lived not in the deserts but on the edge of inhabited places, still remaining in the world but practicing asceticism and striving for union with God. In ante-Nicene asceticism, a man would lead a single life, practice long and frequent fasts, abstain from meat and wine, and support himself, if he were able, by some small handicraft, keeping of what he earned only so much as was absolutely necessary for his own sustenance, and giving the rest to the poor.

An early form of "proto-monasticism" appeared as well in the 3rd century among Syriac Christians through the "Sons of the covenant" movement. Eastern Orthodoxy looks to Basil of Caesarea as a founding monastic legislator, as well to as the example of the Desert Fathers.

==== Eremitic Monasticism ====
Eremitic monasticism, or solitary monasticism, is characterized by a complete withdrawal from society. The word 'eremitic' comes from the Greek word eremos, which means desert.

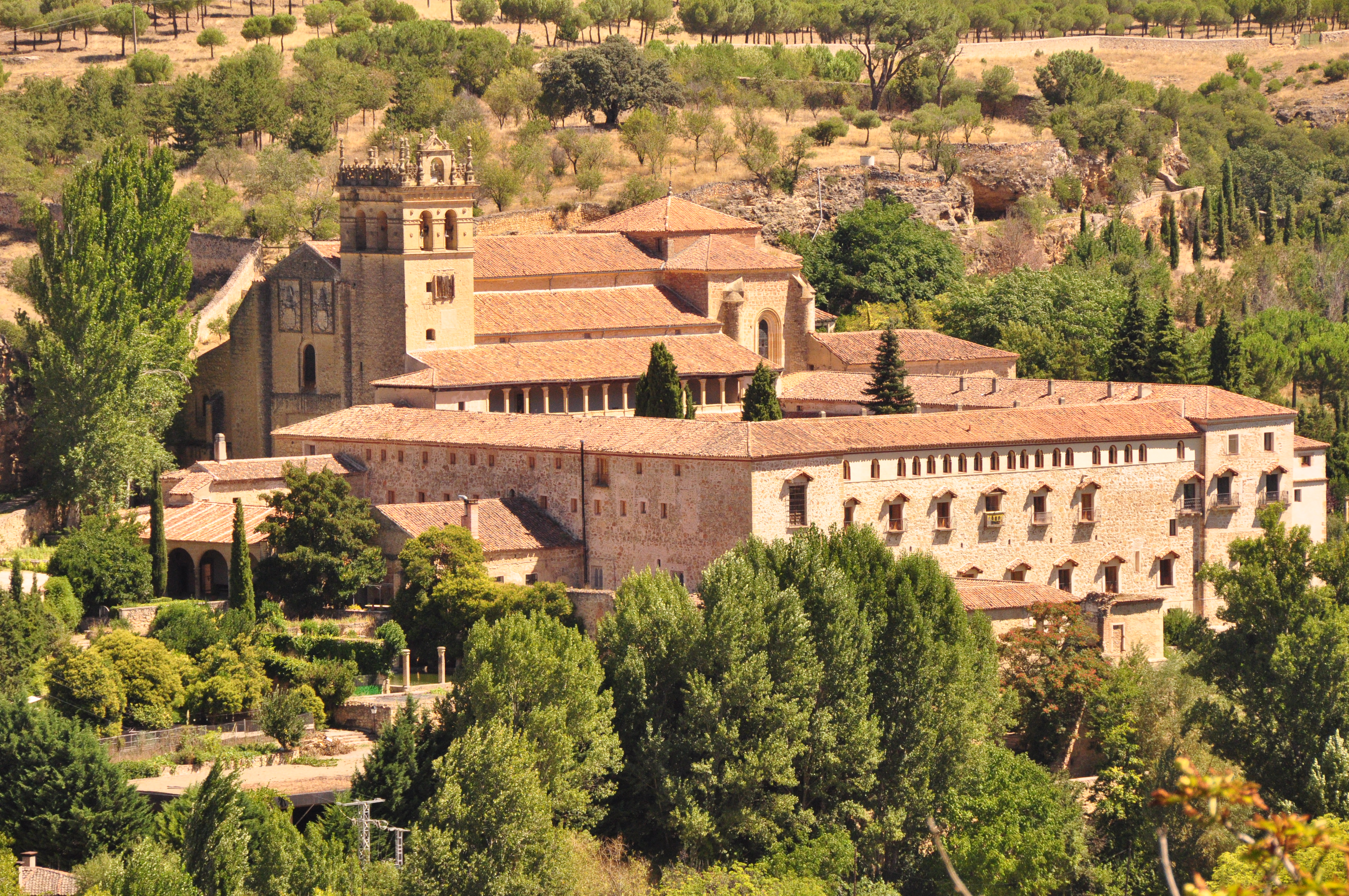
The Monastery of Saint Mary of Parral (Spain) of the Hieronymite hermit monks

Paul the Hermit is the first Christian historically known to have been living as a monk. In the 3rd century, Anthony of Egypt (252–356) lived as a hermit in the desert and gradually gained followers who lived as hermits nearby but not in actual community with him. This type of monasticism is called eremitical or "hermit-like".

Another option for becoming a solitary monastic was to become an anchorite, someone who lived apart from society. In later times, those who wanted to live in monastic solitude but were unable to live alone could request that a bishop perform the rite of enclosure. These anchorites would live alone in a room that typically had a window that opened into a church so they could receive communion and participate in church services. There were two other windows that allowed food to be passed in and people to come to seek advice. The most well-known anchoress was Julian of Norwich who was born in England in 1342.

==== Cenobitic monasticism ====
While the earliest Desert Fathers lived as hermits, they were rarely completely isolated, but often lived in proximity to one another, and soon loose-knit communities began to form in such places as Egypt's Desert of Nitria and the Desert of Skete. Saint Macarius established individual groups of cells such as those at Kellia (in the Nitrian Desert), founded in 338. These monks were anchorites, following the monastic ideal of St. Anthony. They lived by themselves, gathering together for common worship on Saturdays and Sundays only.

In Egypt, St Pachomius established the first cenobitic (from the Greek words "koine" (common) and "bio" (life)) Christian monastery. At Tabenna in Upper Egypt, sometime around 323 AD, Pachomius decided to mold his disciples into a more organized community in which the monks lived in individual huts or rooms (Latin: cellula), but worked, ate, and worshipped in shared space. The intention was to bring together individual ascetics who, although pious, did not, like Saint Anthony, have the physical ability or skills to live a solitary existence in the desert. This method of monastic organization is called cenobitic or "communal". Catholic theological teaching regards this community-based living as superior because of the obedience practiced and the accountability offered. The head of a monastery came to be known by the word for "Father"—in Syriac, Abba; in English, "Abbot".

Guidelines for daily life were created, and separate monasteries were created for men and women. St Pachomius introduced a monastic Rule of cenobitic life, giving everyone the same food and attire. The monks of the monastery fulfilled the obediences assigned them for the common good of the monastery. Among the various obediences was the copying of books. St Pachomius considered that an obedience fulfilled with zeal was greater than fasting or prayer.

A Pachomian monastery was a collection of buildings surrounded by a wall. The monks were distributed in houses, each house containing about forty monks. There would be thirty to forty houses in a monastery. There was an abbot over each monastery and provosts with subordinate officials over each house. The monks were divided into houses according to the work they were employed in: thus there would be a house for carpenters, a house for agriculturists, and so forth. But other principles of division seem to have been employed: there was a house for the Greeks, for example. On Saturdays and Sundays, all the monks assembled in the church for Mass; on other days the Office and other spiritual exercises were celebrated in the houses.

Monasteries thus functioned as industrial communities in which almost every kind of trade was practised. Monks had ships of their own on the Nile to distribute their agricultural produce and manufactured goods to the market and then bring back what the monasteries required.

The community of Pachomius was so successful he was called upon to help organize others, and by one count by the time he died in 346 there were thought to be 3,000 such communities dotting Egypt, especially in the Thebaid. From there monasticism quickly spread out first to Palestine and the Judean Desert, Syria, North Africa and eventually to the rest of the Roman Empire and beyond.

In 370, Basil the Great, monastic founder in Cappadocia, became bishop of Caesarea and wrote down his principles of ascetic life. Eastern monastic teachings were brought to the western church by Saint John Cassian (c. 360 – c. 435). As a young adult, he and his friend Germanus entered a monastery in Palestine, and then journeyed to Egypt to visit the eremitic groups in Nitria. Many years later, Cassian founded a monastery of monks (and probably also one of nuns) near Marseille. He wrote two long works, the Institutes and Conferences. In these books, he provided a view of Christian monasticism that had a strongly evangelical and theological basis.

At the time of his conversion in Mediolanum (present-day Milan) in the years 386–387, Augustine was aware of the life of Saint Anthony in the desert of Egypt. Upon his return to Africa as a Christian in the year 388, however, Augustine and a few Christian friends founded at Thagaste a lay community. They became cenobites in the countryside rather than in the desert.

Saint Benedict (c. 480 – 547 AD) lived for many years as a hermit in a cave near Subiaco, Italy. He was asked to be head over several monks who wished to change to the monastic style of Pachomius by living in a community. Between the years 530 and 560, he wrote the Rule of Saint Benedict as a guideline for monks living in community.

Historian Lester K. Little attributes the rise of monasticism to the immense changes in the church brought about by Constantine's legalization of Christianity in the early fourth century. The subsequent transformation of Christianity into the main Roman religion ended the position of Christians as a minority sect. In response, a new form of dedication developed.

=== Opposition ===
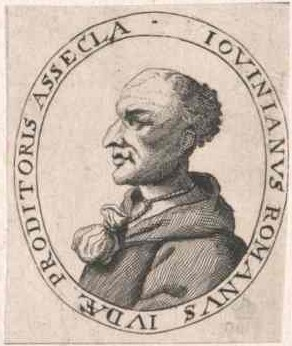
Jovinian was the most influential early opponent of monasticism.

There were opponents of Monasticism in the early days of the church. Among the first opponents to Monasticism were Helvidius, Jovinian, Vigilantius and Aerius of Sebaste. Most of them were rebutted by Jerome, a priest and theologian who defended monastic and ascetic ideas. Monasticism was also opposed by some Arians.

== Eastern Christian monasticism ==
Analavos worn by Eastern Orthodox Schema-Monks

Orthodox monasticism does not have religious orders as in the West, therefore there are no formal Monastic Rules (Regulae); rather, each monk and nun is encouraged to read all of the Holy Fathers and emulate their virtues. There is also no division between the "active" and "contemplative" life. Orthodox monastic life embraces both active and contemplative aspects.

Within the Eastern Orthodox Church, there exist three types of monasticism: eremitic, cenobitic, and the skete (see also lavra). The skete is a very small community, often of two or three (Matthew 18:20), under the direction of an Elder. They pray privately for most of the week, then come together on Sundays and Feast Days for communal prayer, thus combining aspects of both eremitic and coenobitic monasticism.

=== Historical development ===
Even before Saint Anthony the Great (sometimes called the "Father of Monasticism") went out into the desert, there were Christians who devoted their lives to ascetic discipline and striving to lead an evangelical life (i.e., in accordance with the teachings of the Gospel). As monasticism spread in the East from the hermits living in the deserts of Egypt to Palestine, Syria, and on up into Asia Minor and beyond, the sayings (apophthegmata) and acts (praxeis) of the Desert Fathers and Desert Mothers came to be recorded and circulated, first among their fellow monastics and then among the laity as well.

Among these earliest recorded accounts was the Paradise, by Palladius of Galatia, Bishop of Helenopolis (also known as the Lausiac History, after the prefect Lausus, to whom it was addressed). Saint Athanasius of Alexandria (whose Life of Saint Anthony the Great set the pattern for monastic hagiography), Saint Jerome, and other anonymous compilers were also responsible for setting down very influential accounts. Also of great importance are the writings surrounding the communities founded by Saint Pachomius, the father of cenobiticism, and his disciple Saint Theodore.

Among the first to set forth precepts for the monastic life was Saint Basil the Great, a man from a professional family who was educated in Caesarea, Constantinople, and Athens. Saint Basil visited colonies of hermits in Palestine and Egypt but was most strongly impressed by the organized communities developed under the guidance of Saint Pachomius. Saint Basil's ascetical writings set forth standards for well-disciplined community life and offered lessons in what became the ideal monastic virtue: humility.

Saint Basil wrote a series of guides for monastic life (the Lesser Asketikon, the Greater Asketikon, the Morals, etc.) which, while not "Rules" in the legalistic sense of later Western rules, provided firm indications of the importance of a single community of monks, living under the same roof, and under the guidance—and even discipline—of a strong abbot. His teachings set the model for Greek and Russian monasticism but had less influence in the Latin West.

Despite the persistent discourse about withdrawal, monks remained present in urban contexts. They were a key factor in the politics and ecclesiastical life of Constantinople. In some cases monks intervened directly in urban politics, sometimes even taking part in civic unrest as important actors. The proliferation of monasticism in the East has led to an even greater role of monasticism not only in the economic and social life of the countryside but also in such aspects like urban politics, imperial administration or the establishment of orthodox beliefs.

Of great importance to the development of monasticism is the Saint Catherine's Monastery on Mount Sinai in Egypt. Here the Ladder of Divine Ascent was written by Saint John Climacus (c.600), a work of such importance that many Orthodox monasteries to this day read it publicly either during the Divine Services or in Trapeza during Great Lent.

At the height of the East Roman Empire, numerous great monasteries were established, including the twenty "sovereign monasteries" on the Holy Mountain, an actual "monastic republic" wherein the entire country is devoted to bringing souls closer to God. Later, the Philokalia was compiled there.

As the Great Schism between East and West grew, conflict arose over misunderstandings about Hesychasm. Saint Gregory Palamas, bishop of Thessalonica, an experienced Athonite monk, defended Eastern Orthodox spirituality against the critiques of Barlaam of Calabria, and left numerous important works on the spiritual life.

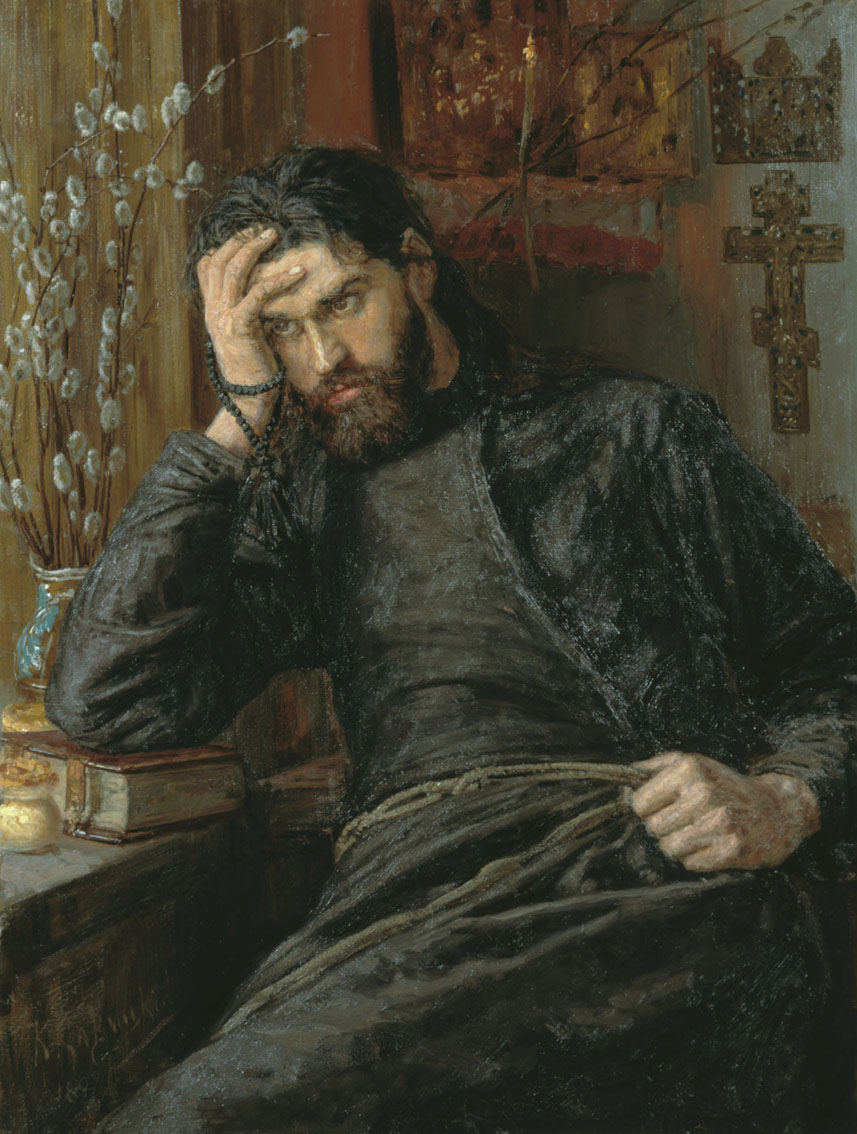
Konstantin Savitsky, monk 1897

=== Present ===
Candidates for the Office of Bishop in the Eastern Orthodox Church are still required by canon law to be unwed/widowed and to take monastic vows if they have not previously done so.

Monastic centers thrive to this day in Bulgaria, Georgia, Greece, North Macedonia, Russia, Romania, Serbia, the Holy Land, and elsewhere. The Autonomous Monastic State of Mount Athos remains the spiritual center of monasticism for the Eastern Orthodox Church.

Monasticism continues to be influential in the Eastern Orthodox Church. Fasting, Hesychasm, and spiritual life are strongly encouraged not only among monastics but also among the laity.

=== Types of Eastern Orthodox monks ===
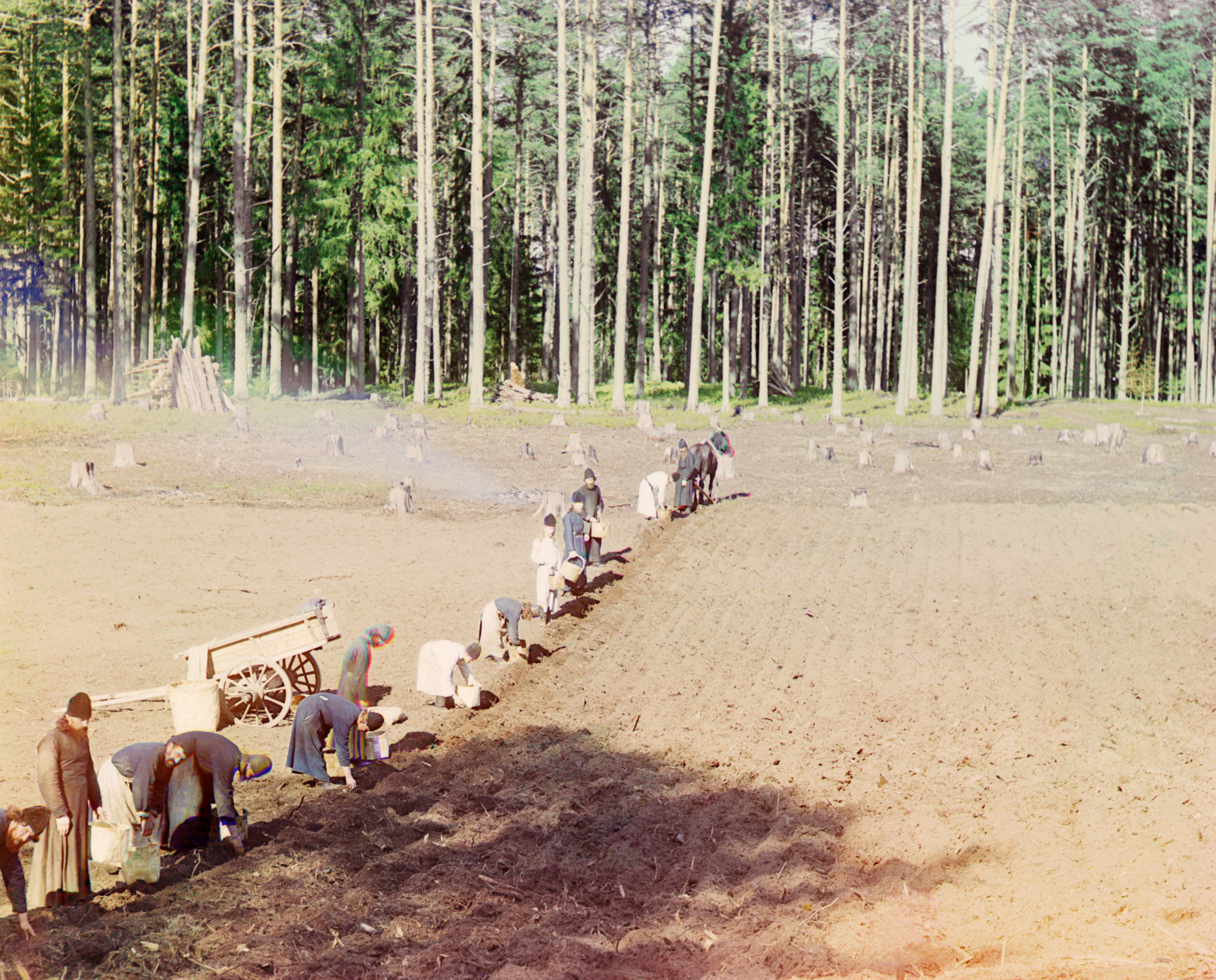
Orthodox monks farming potatoes in Russia, c. 1910.

There are three levels of monasticism: the Rassophore, the Stavrophore, and the Schema-Monk (or Schema-Nun). Each of the three degrees represents an increased level of asceticism. In the early days of monasticism, there was only one level—the Great Schema—and even Saint Theodore the Studite argued against the establishment of intermediate grades, but nonetheless the consensus of the church has favored the development of three distinct levels.

When a candidate wishes to embrace the monastic life, he will enter the monastery of his choice as a guest and ask to be received by the Hegumen (Abbot). After a short period the Hegumen may at his discretion clothe the candidate as a novice. There is no formal ceremony for the clothing of a novice; he or she would simply be given the Podraznik, belt and skoufos.

After a period of several years, the Hegumen may at his discretion tonsure the novice as a Rassophore monk, giving him the outer garment called the Rassa (Greek: Rason). A monk or nun may remain in this grade for the rest of his or her life, if they so choose. The Rite of Tonsure for the Rassophore refers to the grade as that of the "Beginner." The Rassophore is also given a klobuk which he wears in church and on formal occasions. In addition, Rassophores will be given a prayer rope at their tonsure.

The next rank, Stavrophore, is the grade that most Russian monks remain all their lives. The title Stavrophore means "cross-bearer" because when Tonsured into this grade the monastic is given a cross to wear at all times. This cross is called a Paramand—a wooden cross attached by ribbons to a square cloth embroidered with the Instruments of the Passion and the words, "I bear upon my body the marks of the Lord Jesus" (Galatians 6:17). The Paramand is so-called because it is worn under the Mantle (Greek: Mandyas; Church Slavonic: Mantya), which is a long cape which completely covers the monk from neck to foot.

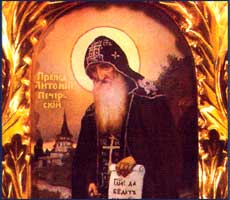
St. Anthony of Kiev wearing the Great Schema.

The highest rank of monasticism is the Great Schema (Greek: Megaloschemos; Church Slavonic: Schimnik). The Schema monk or Schema nun wears the same habit as the Rassophore, with the addition of the Analavos (Church Slavonic: Analav). The Analavos is a garment shaped like a cross, covering the shoulders and coming down to the knees (or lower) in the front and back. This garment is finely embroidered with the Cross and instruments of the Passion. The Klobuk worn by a Schema monk is also embroidered with a cross and other symbols. the Klobuk may be shaped differently, more rounded at the top, in which case it is referred to as a koukoulion.

The religious habit worn by Eastern Orthodox monastics is the same for both monks and nuns, except that the nuns wear an additional veil, called an apostolnik.

The central and unifying feature of Eastern Orthodox monasticism is Hesychasm, the practice of silence, and the concentrated saying of the Jesus Prayer. Monastic humility is guided towards preparing the heart for theoria or the "divine vision" that comes from the union of the soul with God.

== Western Christian monasticism ==
=== History ===
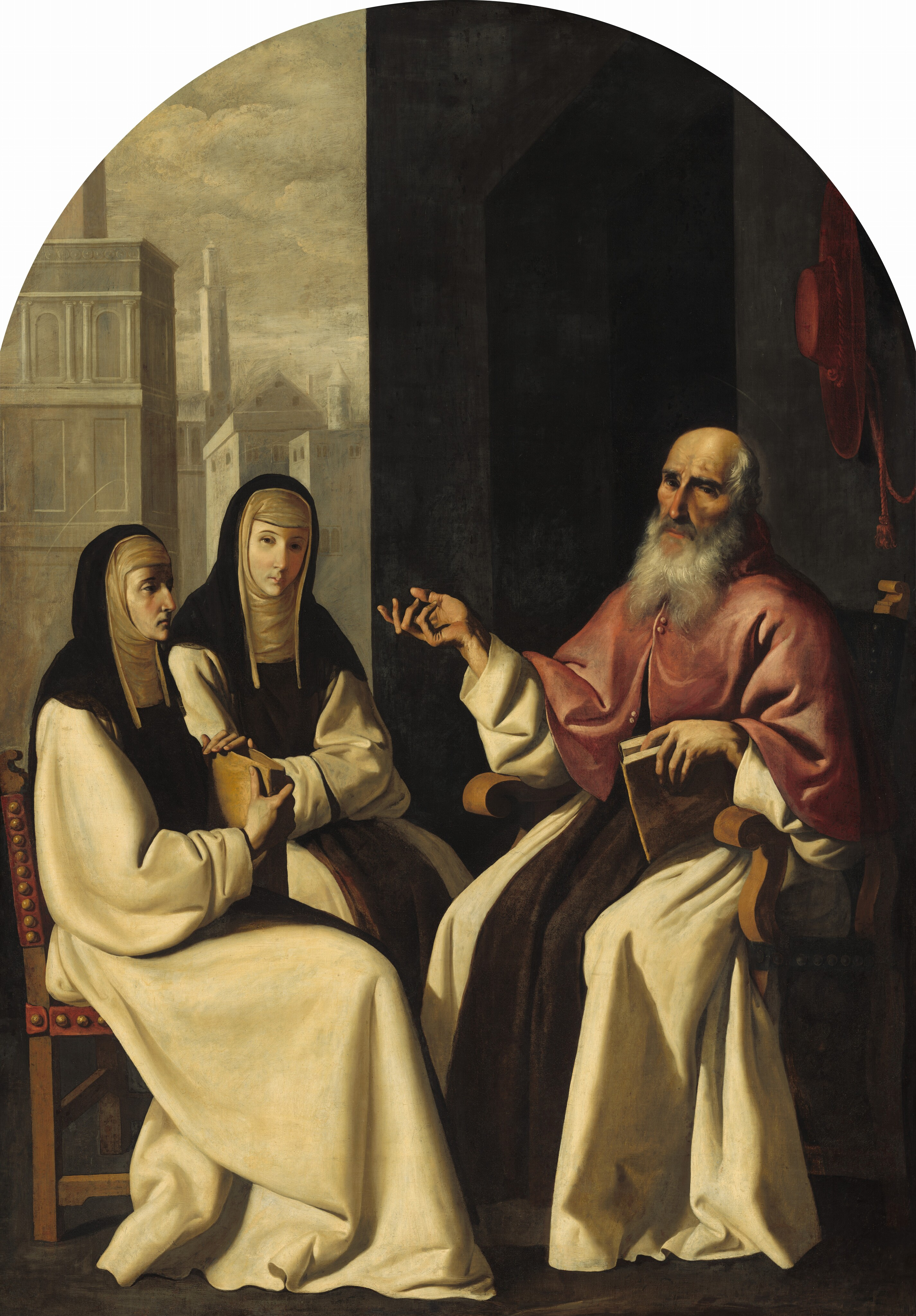
St. Jerome, Paula and Eustochium by Francisco de Zurbarán, 1638–1640

The introduction of monasticism into the West may be dated from about AD 340 when St. Athanasius visited Rome accompanied by the two Egyptian monks Ammon and Isidore, disciples of St. Anthony. The publication of the "Vita Antonii" some years later and its translation into Latin spread the knowledge of Egyptian monachism widely and many were found in Italy to imitate the example thus set forth. The first Italian monks aimed at reproducing exactly what was done in Egypt and not a few—such as Saint Jerome, Rufinus, Paula, Eustochium and the two Melanias (Elder and Younger)—actually went to live in Egypt or Palestine as being better suited to monastic life than Italy.

The earliest phases of monasticism in Western Europe involved figures like Martin of Tours, who after serving in the Roman legions converted to Christianity and established a hermitage near Milan, then moved on to Poitiers where a community gathered around his hermitage. He was called to become Bishop of Tours in 372, where he established a monastery at Marmoutier on the opposite bank of the Loire, a few miles upstream from the city. His cell was a hut of wood, and round it his disciples, who soon numbered eighty, dwelt in caves and huts. His monastery was laid out as a colony of hermits rather than as a single integrated community. The type of life was simply the Antonian monachism of Egypt.

Honoratus of Marseille was a wealthy Gallo-Roman aristocrat, who after a pilgrimage to Egypt, founded the Monastery of Lérins in 410, on an island lying off the modern city of Cannes. The monastery combined a community with isolated hermitages where older, spiritually-proven monks could live in isolation. Lérins became, in time, a center of monastic culture and learning, and many later monks and bishops would pass through Lérins in the early stages of their career. Honoratus was called to be Bishop of Arles.

John Cassian began his monastic career at a monastery in Palestine and Egypt around 385 to study monastic practice there. In Egypt, he had been attracted to the isolated life of hermits, which he considered the highest form of monasticism, yet the monasteries he founded were all organized monastic communities. About 415 he established two monasteries near Marseille, one for men, one for women. In time these attracted a total of 5,000 monks and nuns. Most significant for the future development of monasticism were Cassian's Institutes, which provided a guide for monastic life and his Conferences, a collection of spiritual reflections.

==== Celtic monasticism ====
It seems that the first Celtic monasteries were merely settlements where the Christians lived together—priests and laity, men, women, and children alike—as a kind of religious clan. According to James F. Kenney, every important church was a monastic establishment, with a small walled village of monks and nuns living under ecclesiastical discipline, and ministering to the people of the surrounding area. Monastic spirituality came to Britain and then Ireland from Gaul, by way of Lérins, Tours, and Auxerre. Its spirituality was heavily influenced by the Desert Fathers, with a monastic enclosure surrounding a collection of individual monastic cells. The British church employed an episcopal structure corresponding closely to the model used elsewhere in the Christian world. Illtud, David, Gildas, and Deiniol were leading figures in 6th-century Britain.

According to Thomas O'Loughlin, "Each monastery should be seen, as with most monasteries of the period, as an individual response to the monastic impulse by someone who had experienced monasticism and then went off to establish either a hermitage to which others later came or a cenobitic community." The monasteries were organized on a family basis. Next in importance to the abbot was the scribe, in charge of the scriptorium, the teaching function of the monastery, and the keeping of the annals. The role of scribe was often a path to the position of abbot. Hereditary right and relationship to the abbot were factors influencing appointment to monastic offices.

Buildings would generally have been of wood, wattle, and thatch. Monasteries tended to be cenobitical in that monks lived in separate cells but came together for common prayer, meals, and other functions. Celtic monasticism was characterized by a rigorous asceticism and a love for learning.

Some more austere ascetics became hermits living in remote locations in what came to be called the "green martyrdom".

==== Double monasteries ====
The monastery of Brigit of Kildare at Kildare, Ireland, was a double monastery, with both men and women, supervised by an Abbess, a pattern found in other monastic foundations.

==== Scotland ====
Around 397, Ninian, a Briton probably from the area south of the Firth of Clyde, dedicated his church at Whithorn to St. Martin of Tours. According to Bede, Ninian evangelized the southern Picts.

Kentigern was an apostle of the British Kingdom of Strathclyde in the late 6th century and the founder and patron saint of the city of Glasgow. Due to anti-Christian sentiment, he re-located for a time to Wales, where he established a monastery at St. Asaph's. Here he divided the monks into three groups. The unlettered was assigned to the duty of agriculture, the care of cattle, and the other necessary duties outside the monastery. He assigned 300 to duties within the cloister of the monastery, such as preparing food and building offices within the monastery enclosure. The remaining monks, who were lettered, he appointed to the celebration of divine service in church by day and by night.

==== Wales ====
Cadoc founded Llancarfan in the latter part of the fifth century. He received the religious habit from an Irish monk, St. Tathai, superior of a small community near Chepstow, in Monmouthshire. Returning to his native county, Cadoc built a church, and monastery, which was called Llancarfan, or the "Church of the Stags". There he also established a college and a hospital. His legend recounts that he daily fed a hundred clergy and a hundred soldiers, a hundred workmen, a hundred poor men, and the same number of widows. When thousands left the world and became monks, they very often did so as clansmen, dutifully following the example of their chief. Bishoprics, canonries, and parochial benefices passed from one to another member of the same family, and frequently from father to son. Their tribal character is a feature which Irish and Welsh monasteries had in common.

Illtyd spent the first part of his religious life as a disciple of Cadoc at Llancarfan. He founded the monastery at Llanilltyd Fawr. One of his students was Paul Aurelian, a key figure in Cornish monasticism. Gildas the Wise was also a student at Llanilltyd Fawr, as was Samson of Dol. Samson founded a monastery in an abandoned Roman fort near the river Severn and lived for a time the life of a hermit in a nearby cave before going to Brittany.

St David established his monastery on a promontory on the western sea, well placed to be a centre of Insular Christianity. His establishment became known for its austerity and holiness, more than as a centre of learning, although when King Alfred sought a scholar for his court, he summoned Asser of St David's. Contemporary with David were Teilo, Cadoc, Padarn, Beuno and Tysilio among them.

==== Cornwall ====
Many early medieval settlements in the region were occupied by hermitage chapels which are often dedicated to St Michael as the conventional slayer of pagan demons, as at St Michael's Mount.

==== Ireland ====
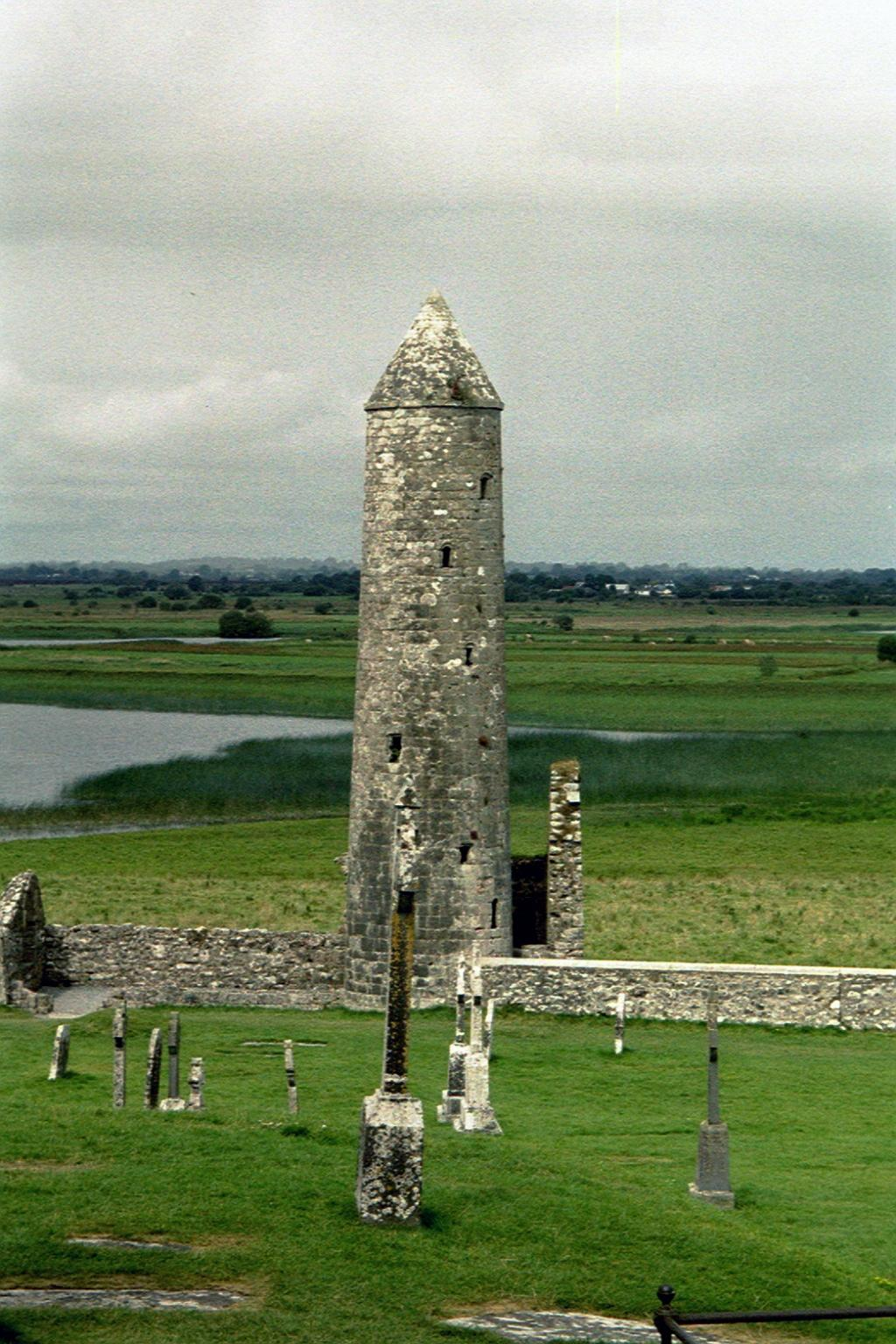
Clonmacnois Round Tower

The earliest monastic settlements in Ireland emerged at the end of the fifth century. It was from Illtud and his colleagues that the Irish sought guidance on matters of ritual and discipline. Enda of Aran is called the "patriarch of Irish monasticism". A warrior prince of Oriel, upon the death of his betrothed he decided to study for the priesthood. He first joined St Ailbe at Emly, before traveling to Ninian's Candida Casa in Scotland, where he was ordained. About 484 he established the first Irish monastery at Killeaney on Aran Mor. Finnian of Clonard is said to have studied under Cadoc at Llancarfan in Glamorganshire. Finnian of Moville studied under Colman of Dromore and Mochae of Noendrum, before he too went to Candida Casa.

Ireland was a rural society of chieftains living in the countryside. As in Wales, if a clan chieftain accepted Christianity so did those he ruled. Commonly, Irish monasteries were established by grants of land to an abbot or abbess who came from a local noble family. The monastery became the spiritual focus of the tribe or kin group. Successive abbots and abbesses were members of the founder's family, a policy which kept the monastic lands under the jurisdiction of the family (and corresponded to Irish legal tradition, which only allowed the transfer of land within a family). In Ireland, the abbot was often called "coarb", a term designating the heir or successor of the founder.

The abbots of the principal monasteries— such as Clonard, Armagh, Clonmacnoise, Swords, etc.—were of the highest rank and held in the greatest esteem. They wielded great power and had vast influence. The abbot usually was only a presbyter, but in the large monasteries, there were one or more resident bishops who conferred orders and discharged the other functions of a bishop. The abbot was superior of the house, and all were subject to him.

The Irish rule was rigorous. The daily routine of monastic life was prayer, study, and manual labor. With regard to food, the rule was very strict. Only one meal a day, at 3 o'clock p.m., was allowed, except on Sundays and Feast days. Wednesdays and Fridays were fast days, except the interval between Easter and Whit Sunday. The food allowed was barley bread, milk, fish, and eggs. Flesh meat was not allowed except on great feasts.

In Ireland, a distinctive form of penance developed, where confession was made privately to a priest, under the seal of secrecy, and where penance was given privately and ordinarily performed privately as well. Penance was considered therapeutic rather than punitive. Certain handbooks were made, called "penitentials", designed as a guide for confessors and as a means of regularising the penance given for each particular sin. According to Thomas Pollock Oakley, the penitential guides first developed in Wales, probably at St. David's, and spread by missions to Ireland.

Irish monasticism maintained the model of a monastic community while, like John Cassian, marking the contemplative life of the hermit as the highest form of monasticism. Saints' lives frequently tell of monks (and abbots) departing some distance from the monastery to live in isolation from the community. Irish monastic rules specify a stern life of prayer and discipline in which prayer, poverty, and obedience are the central themes.

Irish monks learned Latin, the language of the Church. Thus they read Latin texts, both spiritual and secular. Subjects taught included Latin, Greek, Hebrew, grammar, rhetoric, poetry, arithmetic, chronology, the Holy Places, hymns, sermons, natural science, history and especially the interpretation of Sacred Scripture. In 544 AD, St Ciarán founded a monastery at Clonmacnoise, which became one of the most important centers of learning and religious life in Ireland. Contrary to common practice, the title of abbot – which included the title "Comarba of Saint Ciarán" – at the community was not hereditary, which reflected the humble origins of its founder. In 557, St Brendan founded a monastery at Clonfert.

By the end of the seventh century, Irish monastic schools attracted students from England and Europe.

Irish monastic achievements of insular art, in illuminated manuscripts like the Book of Kells, high crosses, metalwork like the Ardagh Chalice and the Cross of Cong and manuscript decoration had a profound influence on Western medieval art. The manuscripts were produced by and for monasteries, and evidence suggests that metalwork was produced in both monastic and royal workshops.

==== Culdees ====
The Culdees (Irish: Céilí Dé, lit. "Spouses of God") were members of ascetic Christian monastic and eremitical communities of Ireland, Scotland, Wales and England in the Middle Ages. Appearing first in Ireland and subsequently in Scotland, attached to cathedral or collegiate churches, they lived in monastic fashion though not taking monastic vows.

==== Hiberno-Scottish mission ====
Irish monasticism spread widely, first to Scotland and Northern England, then to Gaul and Italy. Columba and his followers established monasteries at Bangor, on the northeastern coast of Ireland, at Iona, an island north-west of Scotland, and at Lindisfarne, which was founded by Aidan, an Irish monk from Iona, at the request of King Oswald of Northumbria. Abbots of Iona were normally appointed from the founders kin, with an abbot often naming his successor.

Columbanus, an abbot from a Leinster noble family, traveled to Gaul in the late 6th century with twelve companions. Columbanus and his followers spread the Irish model of monastic institutions to the continent. A whole series of new monastic foundations under Irish influence sprang up, starting with Columbanus's foundations of Luxeuil and Fontaine-lès-Luxeuil and, sponsored by the Frankish King Childebert II. After Childebert's death Columbanus traveled east to Metz, where Theudebert II allowed him to establish a new monastery among the semi-pagan Alemanni in what is now Switzerland. One of Columbanus's followers founded the monastery of St. Gall on the shores of Lake Constance, while Columbanus continued onward across the Alps to the kingdom of the Lombards in Italy. There King Agilulf and his wife Theodolinda granted Columbanus land in the mountains between Genoa and Milan, where he established the monastery of Bobbio. From about 698 until the reign of Charlemagne in the 770s, the Hiberno-Scottish efforts in the Frankish Empire were continued by the Anglo-Saxon mission. The rule of St. Columbanus, which was originally followed in most of these monasteries, was eventually superseded by that of St. Benedict.

==== Benedictine monasticism ====
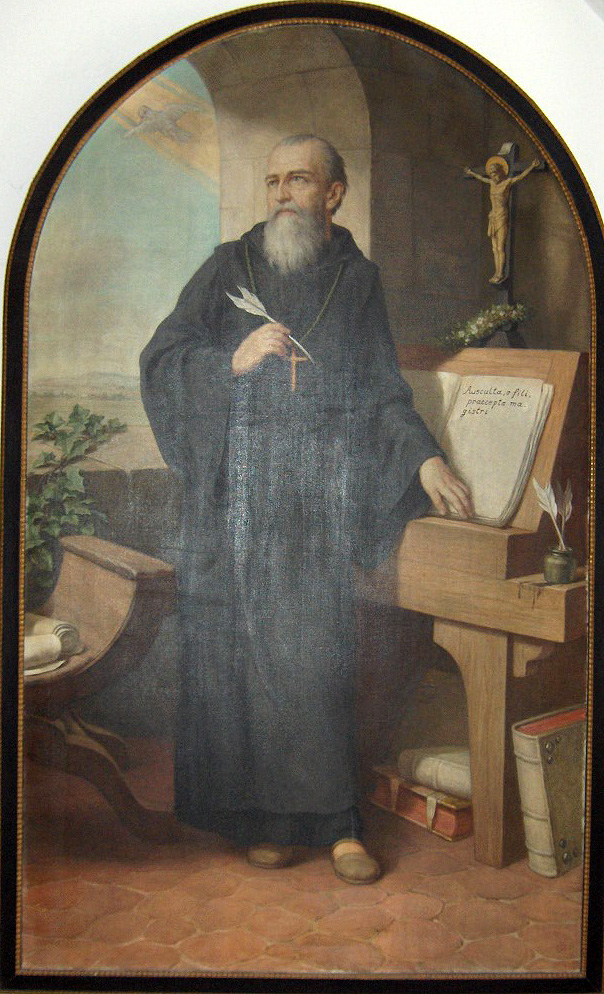
Saint Benedict by Herman Nieg, Heiligenkreuz Abbey, Austria

Benedict of Nursia is the most influential of Western monks and is called "the Father of Western Monasticism". He was educated in Rome but soon sought the life of a hermit in a cave at Subiaco, outside the city. He then attracted followers with whom he founded the monastery of Monte Cassino around 520, between Rome and Naples. He established the Rule of St Benedict, adapting in part the earlier anonymous Rule of the Master (Regula magistri), which was written somewhere south of Rome around 500, and defined the activities of the monastery, its officers, and their responsibilities. By the ninth century, largely under the inspiration of the Emperor Charlemagne, Benedict's Rule became the basic guide for Western monasticism.

While the Celtic monasteries had a stronger connection to the semi-eremitical tradition of Egypt via Lérins and Tours, Benedict and his followers were more influenced by the cenobitism of St Pachomius and Basil the Great. Early Benedictine monasteries were relatively small and consisted of an oratory, refectory, dormitory, scriptorium, guest accommodation, and out-buildings, a group of often quite separate rooms more reminiscent of a decent-sized Roman villa than a large medieval abbey. A monastery of about a dozen monks would have been normal during this period.

Medieval monastic life consisted of prayer, reading, and manual labor. Prayer was a monk's first priority. Apart from prayer, monks performed a variety of tasks, such as preparing medicine, lettering, reading, and others. Also, these monks would work in the gardens and on the land. They might also spend time in the cloister, a covered colonnade around a courtyard, where they would pray or read. Some monasteries held a scriptorium where monks would write or copy books.

The efficiency of Benedict's cenobitic Rule in addition to the stability of the monasteries made them very productive. The monasteries were the central storehouses and producers of knowledge. Vikings started attacking Irish monasteries famous for learning in 793. One monk wrote about how he did not mind the bad weather one evening because it kept the Vikings from coming: "Bitter is the wind tonight, it tosses the ocean's white hair, I need not fear—as on a night of calm sea—the fierce raiders from Lochlann."

In the eleventh and twelfth centuries, the growing pressure of monarchies and the nation-states undermined the wealth and power of the orders. Monasticism continued to play a role in Catholicism, but after the Protestant reformation many monasteries in Anglican England were shut down and their assets seized. In Evangelical Lutheran lands, certain monasteries, convents and abbeys accepted the Evangelical Lutheran faith and continued their practice; at present, Benedictine spirituality is found in various Evangelical Lutheran monasteries such as Östanbäck Monastery, Saint Augustine's House, and Priory of St. Wigbert.

=== Military orders ===
In the twelfth century, traditional monastic orders in Outremer evolved into military orders, initially for the purpose of defending pilgrims, although they later became larger military forces that played a key role in combating Muslim efforts at reconquest and propping up continued Christian rule in the region. These orders included the Knights Templar, Knights Sancti Sepulchri and the Knights Hospitaller. In large part, the notion of military monasticism was popularised because of the advocacy of St. Bernard of Clairvaux, who believed that existing Christian methods of serving the Church's ends in the war were inadequate and that a group of dedicated warrior monks, who achieved spiritual merit and served God through waging war, was necessary. In his view, advancing the cause of Christendom was an end that justified means that might fall outside the bounds of just war. These orders largely declined with the loss of Outremer in the 1200s - except for the Teutonic Order, which transferred itself to the Baltic where it took up a major role in the Baltic Crusades.

=== Western Christian orders in the modern era ===
Many distinct monastic orders developed within Catholicism and Protestantism. Monastic communities in the West, broadly speaking, are organized into orders and congregations guided by a particular religious rule, most commonly the Rule of St Benedict.

==== Catholicism ====
- Benedictines, founded in 529 by Saint Benedict at Monte Cassino, stresses manual labor in a self-sufficient monastery. They are an order of independent monastic communities.
- Cluniacs, a branch of the Benedictines, at its height c.950-c.1130
- Camaldolese, a branch of the Benedictines, founded c.1000 Saint Romuald of Ravenna.
- Vallombrosans, a branch of the Benedictines, founded c. 1038 by Saint John Gualbert.
- Carthusians, also known as the Order of Saint Bruno, founded 1084 by Saint Bruno of Cologne. Open to both sexes; combines eremitical and cenobitic life.
- Cistercians, the Order of Cîteaux, sometimes referred to as the Order of Saint Bernard, founded in 1098 by Saint Robert of Molesme.
- Paulines, founded in Hungary in 1225 by Blessed Eusebius.
- Celestines, founded in 1244 and originally called Hermits of Saint Damiano, or Moronites (or Murronites). Became known as Celestines after their founder was elected Pope and took the name Celestine V.
- Olivetans or the Order of Our Lady of Mount Olivet, a branch of the Benedictines, founded in 1313 by Bernardo Tolomei (born Giovanni Tolomei) along with two of his friends from the noble families of Siena, Patrizio Patrizi and Ambrogio Piccolomini.
- Bridgettines, founded in 1344 by Saint Bridget of Sweden.
- Hieronymites, founded in Spain in 1364, by an eremitical community formally known as the Order of Saint Jerome.
- Conceptionists, formally the Order of the Immaculate Conception, founded in 1484 by Saint Beatrice of Silva.
- Turchines, formally the Order of the Most Holy Annunciation, founded in 1604 by Blessed Maria Vittoria De Fornari Strata
- Visitandines: the Order of the Visitation of Holy Mary, an order of women. Members of the order are also known as the Visitation Sisters. The Order was founded in 1610 by Saint Francis de Sales and Saint Jane Frances de Chantal in Annecy, Haute-Savoie, France.
- Trappists, a Cistercian reform, begun c. 1664.
- Monastic Brothers and Monastic Sisters of Bethlehem, who practice Carthusian spirituality and were founded in consequence of the influence on a small group of French pilgrims of the promulgation of the dogma of the Assumption of the Blessed Virgin Mary into Heaven on November 1, 1950, in St. Peter's Square, in Vatican City. The Monastic Sisters were founded in France, soon after the event, and the Monastic Brothers in 1976.

==== Lutheran Church ====
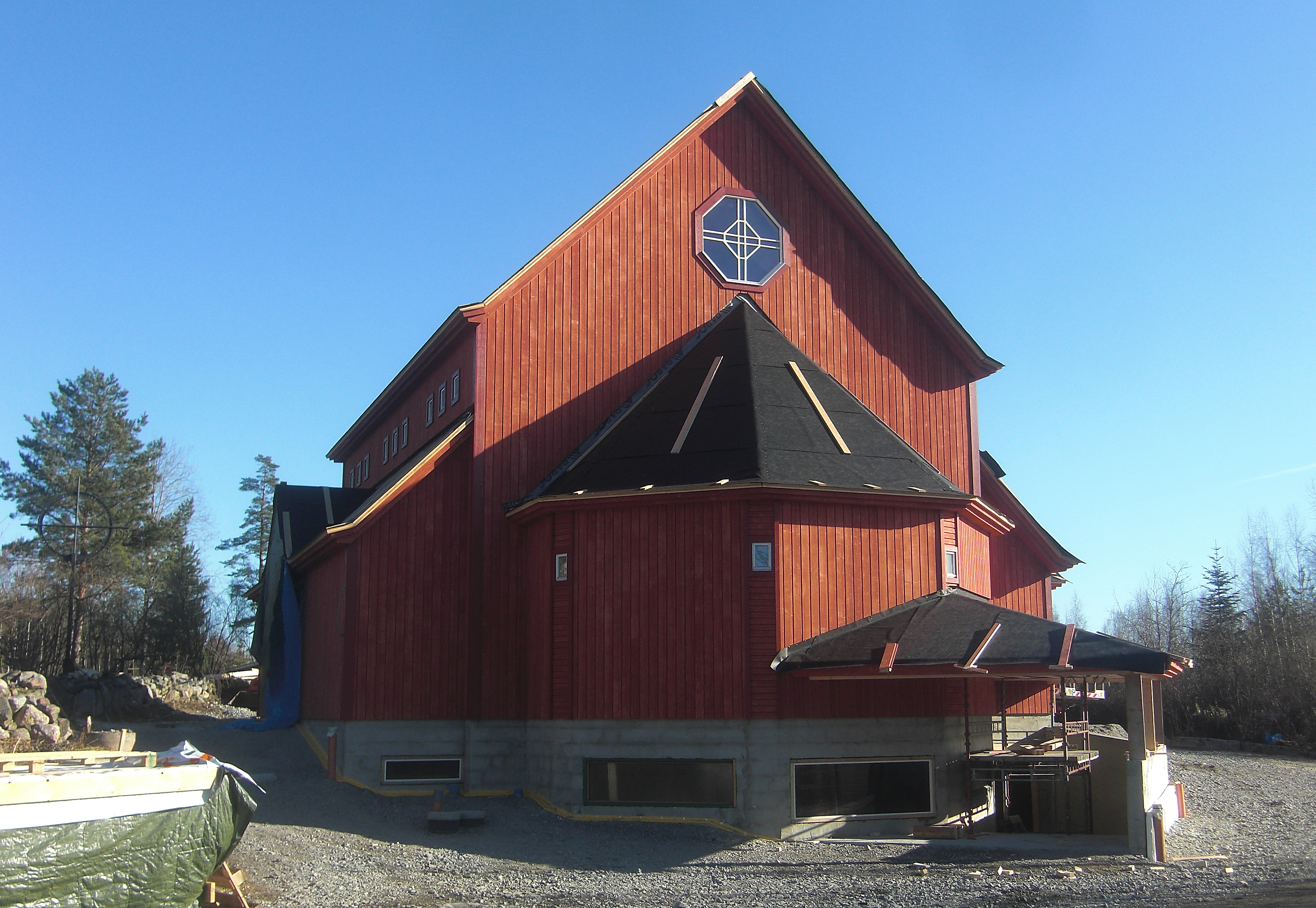
Östanbäck Monastery is an Evangelical Lutheran monastery in the Benedictine tradition.

After the foundation of the Lutheran Churches, some monasteries in Lutheran lands (such as Amelungsborn Abbey near Negenborn and Loccum Abbey in Rehburg-Loccum) and convents (such as Ebstorf Abbey near the town of Uelzen and Bursfelde Abbey in Bursfelde) adopted the Lutheran Christian faith.

Loccum Abbey and Amelungsborn Abbey have the longest traditions as Lutheran monasteries. Since the 19th century, there has been a renewal in the monastic life among Protestants. There are many present-day Evangelical Lutherans who practice the monastic life in a similar fashion as those of the Catholic Church.

In 1947 Mother Basilea Schlink and Mother Martyria founded the Evangelical Sisterhood of Mary, in Darmstadt, Germany. This movement is largely considered Evangelical or Lutheran in its roots.

In 1948 Bavarian Lutheran pastor Walter Hümmer and his wife Hanna founded the Communität Christusbruderschaft Selbitz.

In 1958, men joined Father Arthur Kreinheder in observing the monastic life and offices of prayer and The Congregation of the Servants of Christ was established at St. Augustine's House in Oxford, Michigan. These men and others came and went over the years. The community has remained small; at times the only member was Father Arthur. During the 35 years of its existence, over 25 men tested their vocations to monastic life by living at the house for some time, from a few months to many years, but at Father Arthur's death in 1989, only one permanent resident remained. At the beginning of 2006, there are two permanent professed members and two long-term guests. Strong ties remain with this community and their Benedictine-Evangelical Lutheran brothers in Sweden (Östanbäck Monastery) and in Germany the (Priory of St. Wigbert).

In Germany, Communität Casteller Ring is a Lutheran Benedictine community for women.

In 2011, an Augustinian religious order, the Priestly Society of St. Augustine (Societas Sacerdotalis Sancti Augustini) was established by the Anglo-Lutheran Catholic Church.

In Lutheran Sweden, religious life for women had been established by 1954, when Sister Marianne Nordström made her profession through contacts with The Order of the Holy Paraclete and Mother Margaret Cope (1886–1961) at St Hilda's Priory, Whitby, Yorkshire.

==== Anglican Communion ====
In England, John Wycliffe organized the Lollard Preacher Order (the "Poor Priests") to promote his views, many of which resounded with those held by the later Protestant Reformers.

Monastic life in England came to an abrupt end with Dissolution of the Monasteries during the reign of King Henry VIII. The property and lands of the monasteries were confiscated and either retained by the King, sold to landowners, or given to loyal nobility. Monks and nuns were pensioned off and retired or some were forced to either flee for the continent or to abandon their vocations. For around 300 years, there were no monastic communities within any of the Anglican churches.

Shortly after the Oxford Movement began to advocate restoring catholic faith and practice to the Church of England (see Anglo-Catholicism), there was felt to be a need for a restoration of the monastic life. Anglican priest John Henry Newman established a community of men at Littlemore near Oxford in the 1840s while he was vicar of Church of St Mary and St Nicholas, Littlemore. From then forward, there have been many communities of monks, friars, sisters, and nuns established within the Anglican Communion. In 1848, Mother Priscilla Lydia Sellon founded the Anglican Sisters of Charity and became the first woman to take religious vows within the Anglican Communion since the Reformation. In October 1850 the first building specifically built for the purpose of housing an Anglican Sisterhood was consecrated at Abbeymere in Plymouth. It housed several schools for the destitute, a laundry, a printing press, and a soup kitchen. From the 1840s and throughout the following one hundred years, religious orders for both men and women proliferated in the UK and the United States, as well as in various countries of Africa, Asia, Canada, India and the Pacific.

Some Anglican religious communities are contemplative, some active, but a distinguishing feature of the monastic life among Anglicans is that most practice the so-called "mixed life", a combination of a life of contemplative prayer with active service. Anglican religious life closely mirrors that of Catholicism. Like Catholic religious, Anglican religious also take the three vows of poverty, chastity, and obedience. Religious communities live together under a common rule, reciting the Divine Office and celebrating the Eucharist daily.

In the early 20th century when the Anglo-Catholic movement was at its height, the Anglican Communion had hundreds of orders and communities, and thousands of religious. However, since the 1960s there has been a sharp falling off in the numbers of religious in many parts of the Anglican Communion, most notably in the United Kingdom and the United States. In the last few decades of the 20th century, novices have for most communities been few and far between. Some orders and communities have already become extinct. There are, however, still thousands of Anglican religious working today in religious communities around the world. While vocations remain few in some areas, Anglican religious communities are experiencing exponential growth in Africa, Asia, and Oceania.

Around 1964, Reuben Archer Torrey III, an Episcopal missionary, grandson of R. A. Torrey, founded Jesus Abbey as a missionary community in Korea. It has some links with the Episcopal Church and holds an Evangelical doctrine.

==== Methodist Churches ====
In February 2001, the United Methodist Church organized the Saint Brigid of Kildare Monastery. It is a Methodist-Benedictine residential double monastery in Collegeville, Minnesota. Besides monastic orders, the Order of Saint Luke is a dispersed religious order within Methodism.

==== Presbyterian Churches ====
The Community of the Sisterhood Emmanuel was founded in 1973 in Makak, Cameroon, in the Centre Province by Mother Marie, one of the first female Pastors of the Presbyterian Church in Cameroon. In 1975, she moved the community to Agyati in Bafut. In 2019, the sisters relocated to Foumbot. The Sisters are trained in strong collaboration with the sister Institutes of the Catholic Church.

==== Anabaptism ====
Anabaptist Christians "retained many elements of the monastic understanding of a 'holy life' that followed true faith". The Hutterites and Bruderhof, for example, live in intentional communities with their big houses having "ground floors for common work, meals and worship, the two-storey attics with small rooms, like monastic cells, for married couples".

==== Quakerism and Shakerism ====
The Shakers, who are also known as the "Shaking Quakers", have been characterized as a "Protestant monastic order providing refuge and otherworldly compensation". They practice a celibate and communal lifestyle, pacifism, and their model of equality of the sexes, which they institutionalized in their society in the 1780s. They are also known for their simple living, architecture, and furniture. Sincere newcomers are invited to become Shakers:

If someone wants to become a Shaker, and the Shakers assent, the would-be member can move into the dwelling house. If the novices, as they are called, stay a week, they sign an articles of agreement, which protects the colony from being sued for lost wages. After a year, the Shakers will take a vote whether to allow the novice in, but it takes another four years to be granted full Shaker status in sharing in the colony’s finances and administrative and worship decisions.

Currently, there are two remaining Shakers, Brother Arnold Hadd and Sister June Carpenter, though they hope that others will join them at the only remaining Shaker community, the Sabbathday Lake Shaker Village.

== Ecumenical expressions ==
Christian monasticism is experiencing renewal in the form of several new foundations with an 'inter-Christian' vision for their respective communities.

In 1944 Roger Schütz, a pastor of the Swiss Reformed Church, founded a small religious brotherhood in France which became known as the Taizé Community. Although he was partly inspired by the hope of reviving monasticism in the Protestant tradition, the brotherhood was interdenominational, accepting Catholic brothers, and is thus an ecumenical rather than a specifically Protestant community.

The Order of Ecumenical Franciscans is a religious order of men and women devoted to following the examples of Saint Francis of Assisi and Saint Clare of Assisi in their life and understanding of the Christian gospel: sharing a love for creation and those who have been marginalized. It includes members of many different denominations, including Catholics, Eastern Orthodox, and a range of Protestant traditions, such as Evangelical Lutheranism and Anglicanism. The Order understands its charism to include not only ecumenical efforts and the traditional emphases of the Franciscans in general, but also to help to develop relationships between the various Franciscan orders.

Additional expressions of ecumenical monasticism can be seen in the New Monasticism movement arising from Protestant Evangelicalism.

== Contributions ==
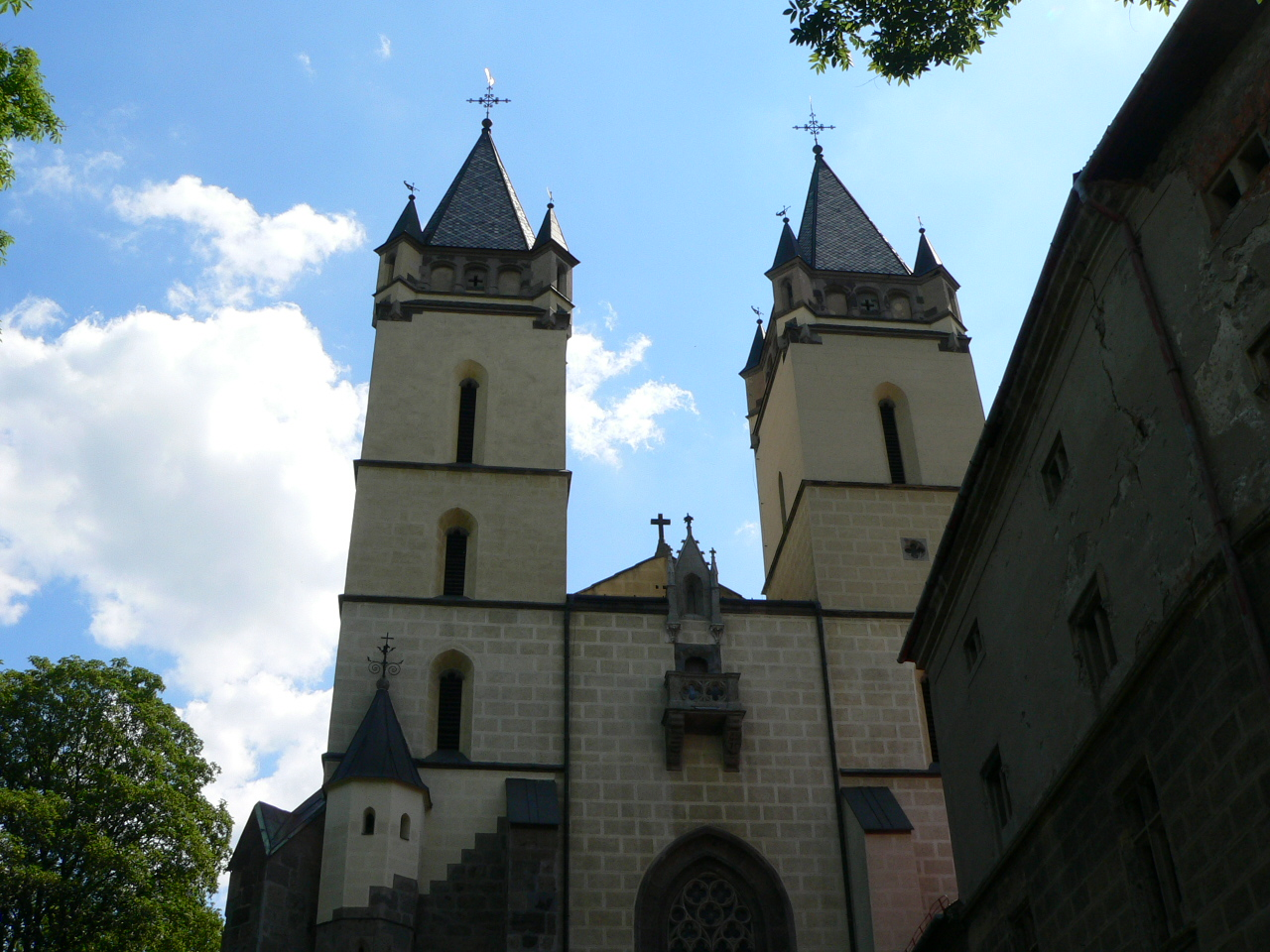
A monastery in Hronský Beňadik (Slovakia)

In traditional Catholic societies, monastic communities often took charge of social services such as education and healthcare.

Max Weber compared the closeted and Puritan societies of the English Dissenters, who sparked much of the Industrial Revolution, to monastic orders.

Many Utopian thinkers (starting with Thomas More) felt inspired by the common life of monks and sought to apply it to society as a whole (an example is the phalanstère).

Today, monasticism remains a part of the Catholic, Eastern Orthodox and Anglican faiths.

=== Education ===
The capitulary of 789 reads: "Let every monastery and every abbey have its school, in which boys may be taught the Psalms, the system of musical notation, singing, arithmetic, and grammar."

In the Middle Ages, monasteries conserved and copied ancient manuscripts in their scriptoria. A prospective monk first learned grammar, logic, and oratory. Later, he would take up mathematics, astronomy, and music. The students would use a stylus on wax. Later, when their handwriting improved, they would be given ink and parchment. Eventually, many of those schools became universities. Monks in scriptoria copied texts of Greece and Rome, as well as religious texts, and kept these manuscripts from being lost during the Middle Ages.

=== Medicine ===
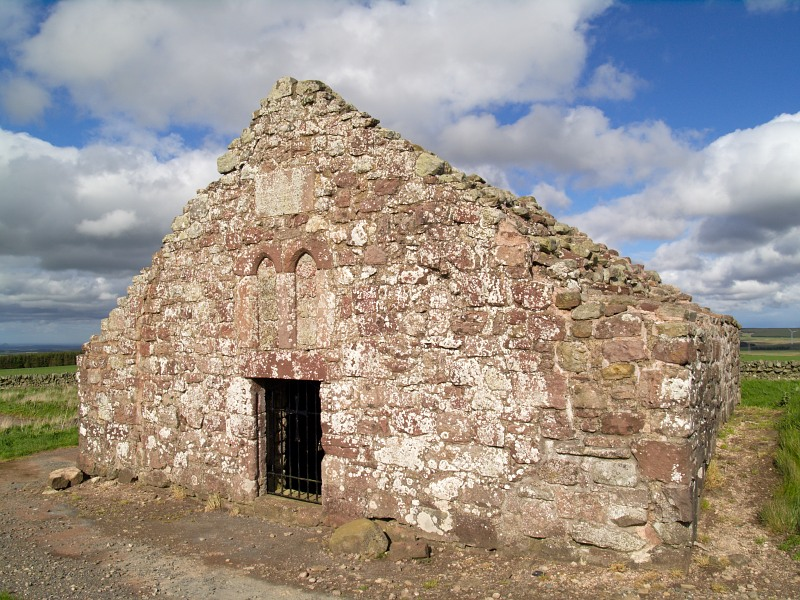
The hospital at Soutra Aisle

Monastic pharmacies stored and studied medicaments. Some of the works that the monks copied were by medical writers, and reading and copying these works helped create a store of medical knowledge. Monasteries had infirmaries to treat the monks, travelers, the poor, old, weak and sick. In 2005, archeologists uncovered waste at Soutra Aisle which helped scientists figure out how people in the Middle Ages treated certain diseases, such as scurvy; because of the vitamin C in watercress, patients would eat it to stop their teeth from falling out. The same archeological group discovered hemlock, a known pain killer, in the drains of the hospital.

Monasteries also aided in the development of agricultural techniques. The requirement of wine for the Mass led to the development of wine culture, as shown in the discovery of the méthode champenoise by Dom Perignon. Several liquors like Bénédictine and the Trappist beers were also developed in monasteries. Even today many monasteries and convents are locally renowned for their cooking specialties.

The consequence of this centralisation of knowledge was that they initially controlled both public administration and education, where the trivium led through the quadrivium to theology. Christian monks cultivated the arts as a way of praising God. Gregorian chant and miniatures are examples of the practical application of quadrivium subjects.

The status of monks as separate from secular life (at least theoretically), also served a social function. Dethroned Visigothic kings were tonsured and sent to a monastery so that they could not reclaim the crown. Monasteries became a place for second sons to live in celibacy to ensure that a family's inheritance went to the first son; and in exchange the families donated to the monasteries. Many cities had a St Giles house for lepers outside the walls, and a Magdalene house for prostitutes and other "fallen women" within the walls.

Monasteries also provided refuge to those like Charles V, Holy Roman Emperor who retired to Yuste in his later years, and his son Philip II of Spain.

== See also ==
- Asceticism
- Chronology of early Christian monasticism
- Clasau—the early Welsh monasteries
- Monasticism in Switzerland
- Consensoria Monachorum
- Coptic monasticism
- Hermit
- Intentional community
- Into Great Silence—the award-winning documentary of life within the Carthusian monsastery of La Grande Chartreuse by Philip Groning
- List of monastic houses in England
- Mount Athos
- New Monasticism
- Oblate
- Order of Watchers—a French Protestant fraternity of Hermits
- Pachomius—an early example of a monastic organizer
- Pustynia
- Rule of St Benedict
- Third order

== Notes, references, and sources ==
=== Sources ===
- Bennett, Harold V. (2002). Injustice Made Legal: Deuteronomic Law and the Plight of Widows, Strangers, and Orphans in Ancient Israel. Eerdmans. ISBN 978-0-8028-3909-1.
- Butler, Edward Cuthbert. "St. Anthony". The Catholic Encyclopedia Vol. 1. Robert Appleton Company.
- Chitty, D. J. (1966). The Desert a City: An Introduction to the Study of Egyptian and Palestinian Monasticism Under the Christian Empire. Oxford: Basil Blackwell.
- Gardner, Edmund. "Juliana of Norwich". The Catholic Encyclopedia Vol. 8. Robert Appleton Company, 1910.
- Jotischky, Andrew (2025). The Monastic World: A 1,200-Year History. New Haven: Yale University Press. ISBN 978-030020856-6.
- Lawrence, C. H. (2001). Medieval Monasticism (3rd ed.). Harlow: Pearson Education. ISBN 0-582-40427-4.
- Levi, Peter (1987). The Frontiers of Paradise: A Study of Monks and Monasteries. London: Collins Harvill. ISBN 978-000272513-2.
- Meyer, R. T. (1950). St. Athanasius: The Life of Anthony. ACW 10. Westminster, Md.: Newman Press.
- Ritari, K. (2009). Saints and Sinners in Early Christian Ireland: Moral Theology in the Lives of Saints Brigit and Columba. Turnhout: Brepols Publishers. ISBN 978-2-503-53315-5.
- Seward, Desmond (1979). Monks and Wine. London: Mitchell Beazley. ISBN 978-085533158-0.
- Sitwell, Sacheverell (1965). Monks, Nuns and Monasteries. London: Weidenfeld & Nicolson.
- Thomas, John P. (1987). Private Religious Foundations in the Byzantine Empire. Washington, D.C.: Dumbarton Oaks. ISBN 9780884021643.
- "Anchoress". The Middle Ages Website.
- "Idiorrhythmic Monasticism". Encyclopædia Britannica. Encyclopædia Britannica Inc.
- "Mendicant Orders in the Medieval World". Heilbrunn Timeline of Art History. The Metropolitan Museum of Art. October 2004.
