= Amelungsborn Abbey =

Coordinates: 51.897°N 9.593°E

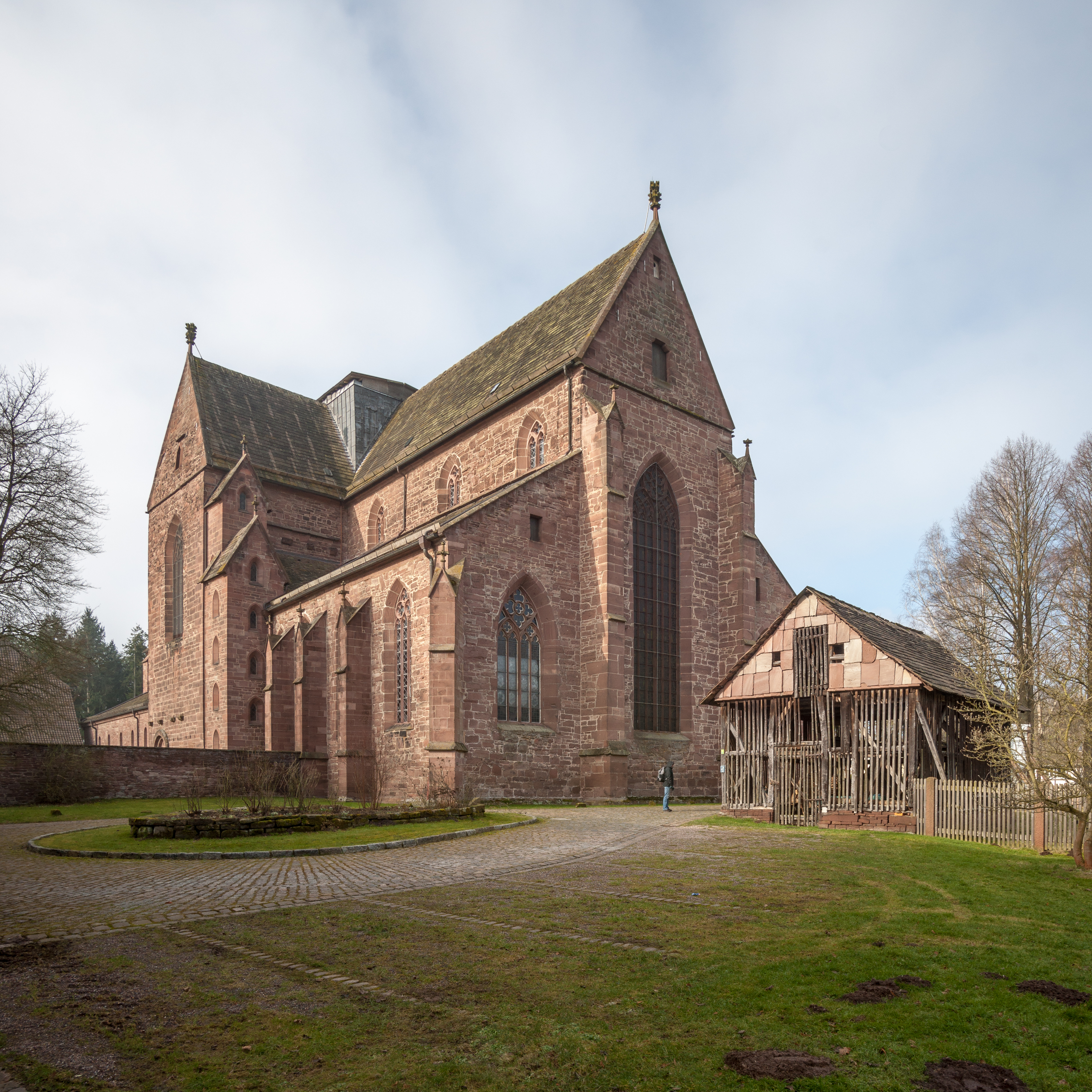
Exterior of Amelungsborn Abbey

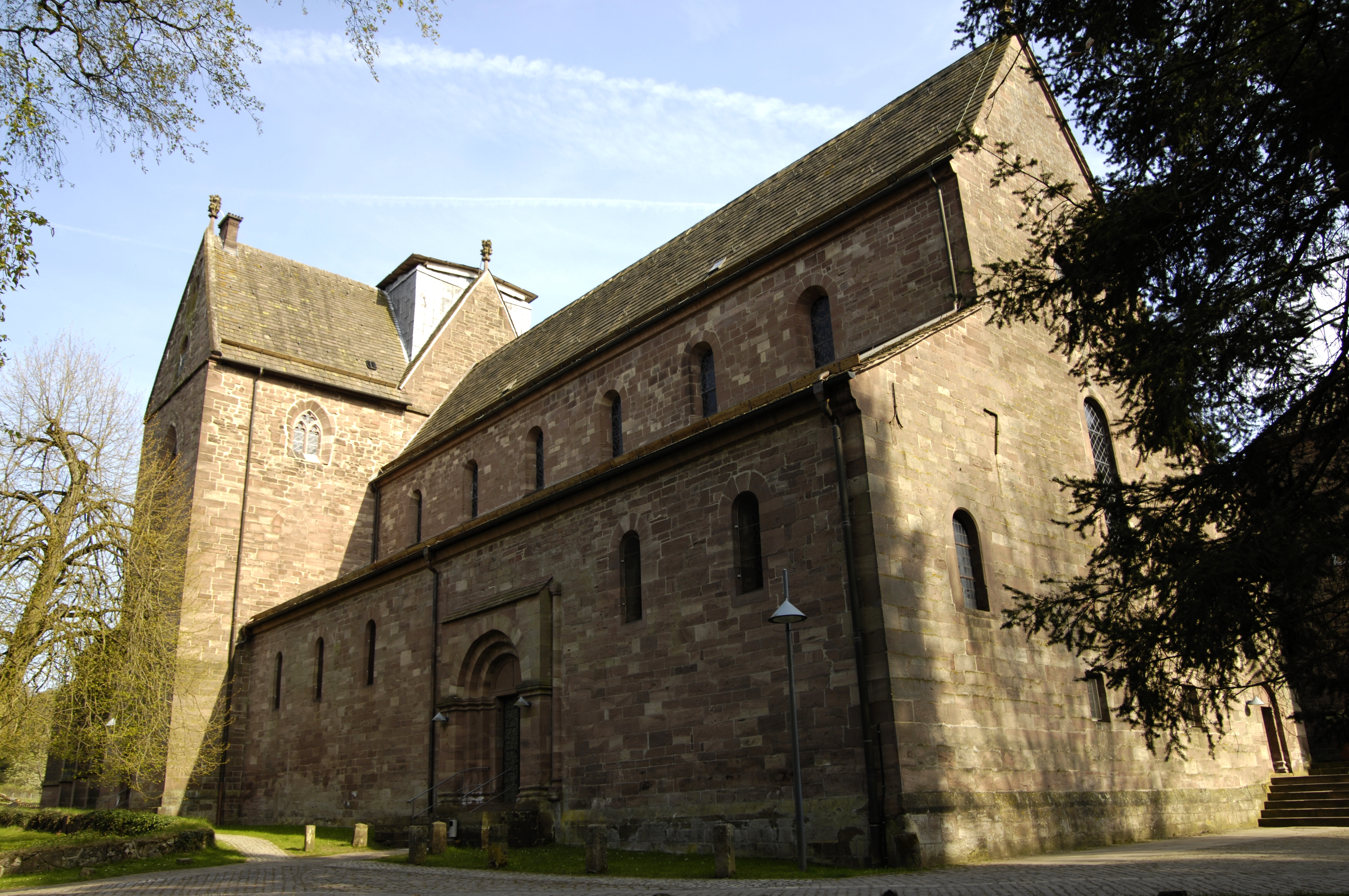
Exterior of Amelungsborn Abbey

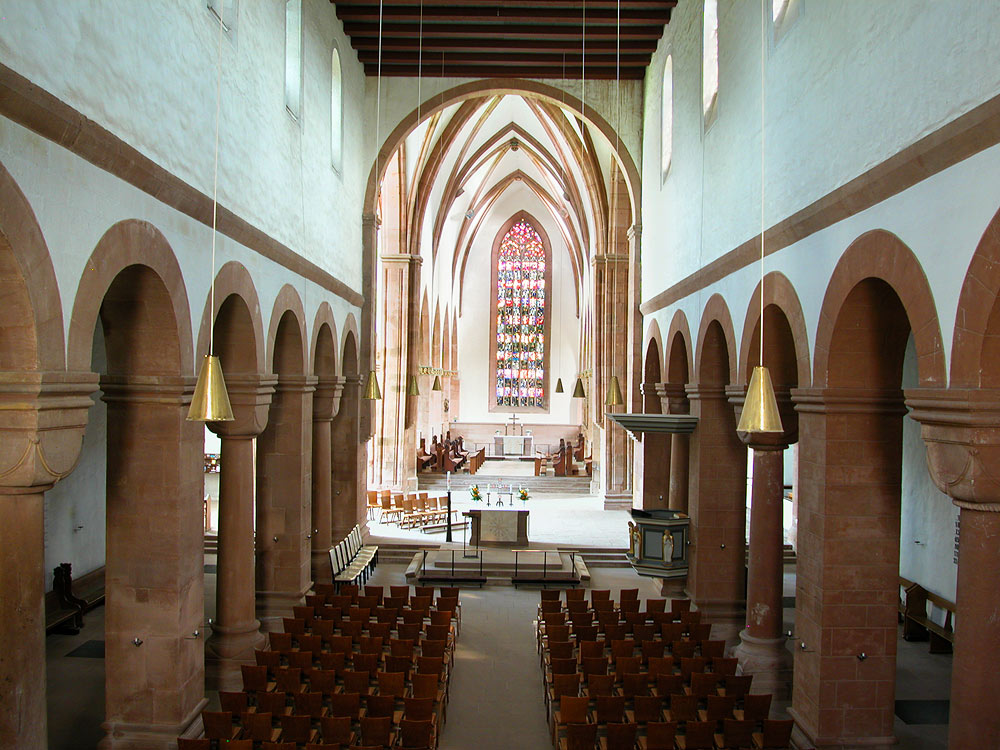
Interior of Amelungsborn Abbey church

Amelungsborn Abbey, also Amelunxborn Abbey (Kloster Amelungsborn), and formally as the Evangelical-Lutheran Cistercian Monastery of Amelungsborn (German: Evangelisch-Lutherischen Zisterzienserkloster Amelungsborn), is an Evangelical Lutheran monastery of the Cistercian tradition, located in Lower Saxony, Germany. It is located near Negenborn and Stadtoldendorf, in the Landkreis of Holzminden in the Weserbergland. It was the second oldest Cistercian foundation in Lower Saxony, Germany, after Walkenried Abbey. During the Reformation, it adopted the Evangelical Lutheran faith, and with Loccum Abbey, also of the Cistercian tradition, it is one of the only two Lutheran monasteries in Germany with an uninterrupted practice. The abbey church, St. Mary's, is also the parish church of the abbey's former estate villages Negenborn and Holenberg.

== Foundation ==
The site of the villa Amelungsborn to the west of the present Stadtoldendorf was originally part of the ancestral lands of the Counts of Northeim.

Siegfried IV, the last Count of Northeim-Boyneburg and Homburg gave the land at Amelungsborn for the foundation of a Cistercian monastery, which was officially settled by a community of monks from Altenkamp Abbey on 20 November 1135.

With the establishment of this monastery and of the nearby Burg Homburg, built at around the same time, it seems that Count Siegfried was aiming to secure a part of his possessions that lay distant from his ancestral seat in North Hessen.

No foundation charter has survived, although there is a confirmation dated 5 December 1129 by Pope Honorius II. Nevertheless, an interval of six years between foundation and settlement fits the general timescale of Cistercian foundations.

The abbey was dedicated in 1135 by Bernhard I, Bishop of Hildesheim. The first abbot of Amelungsborn, appointed in 1141, was Heinrich I, a half-brother of the founder, Count Siegfried IV.

== Development and daughter houses ==
The new monastery prospered and was soon able to extend the settlements of the order. As early as 1138 a monk of Amelungsborn was appointed abbot of Mariental Abbey near Helmstedt. In 1145 Amelungsborn provided the entire community (12 monks and an abbot) for the foundation of Riddagshausen Abbey near Braunschweig, of which it was thus the mother house.

Amelungsborn was also the mother house of the rich and powerful Doberan Abbey (in the present Bad Doberan near Rostock), in 1171 and again in 1176, at the instigation of the missionary bishop Berno, once a monk of Amelungsborn, who in 1155 became Bishop of Mecklenburg and when in 1160 the seat of the bishopric was moved, the first Bishop of Schwerin.

Further foundations at one remove were at Isenhagen-Marienrode near Wittingen and Wahlshausen near Fuldatal, daughter houses of Riddagshausen, and Dargun Abbey and Pelplin Abbey, daughter houses of Doberan. Amelungsborn became the richest monastery of the Welf sphere of influence, and the one most closely connected with the German colonisation to the east. By about 1280 the community numbered 50 monks and 90 lay-brothers.

Even after the alienation of their Mecklenburg estates, principally round Satow and Dranse, in the 14th century, Amelungsborn Abbey remained an extensive landowner, thanks largely to the generosity of the Edelherren of Homburg, successors of the founder, and the Counts of Everstein, who gave many estates between the Weser and Leine, among them lands at Allersheim near Holzminden, Schnedinghausen near Moringen, Erzhausen, Bruchhof and Holtershausen near Greene, besides possessions in the towns of Einbeck, Höxter and Hameln, and forests near the abbey itself.

== After the Reformation ==
During the first half of the 16th century Amelungsborn fell increasingly into the power of the Welf territorial princes. In 1549 the abbey was forced to cede the lucrative farm at Allersheim to Duke Henry the Younger of Brunswick.

In 1568 Duke Julius of Brunswick implemented the Reformation in his realm, and the abbot and community converted to Lutheranism. The first Lutheran abbot was Andreas Steinhauer (d. 1588), who founded the school for which the abbey was from this point on principally known.

In 1760 the abbey school was transferred to Holzminden by Duke Charles I of Brunswick-Wolfenbüttel and merged with the town school, the predecessor of the present Campe Gymnasium.

Under the rule of Napoleon in 1806 Amelungsborn Abbey was dissolved, but by an anomaly the position of abbot remained. When in 1875 the school was taken over by the state and the educational duties of the abbey ended, the office of abbot remained as an honorary title for members of the senior Brunswick clergy

From 1912 the position was left vacant for political reasons. In 1941 the church was transferred to the Hanover State Church (Landeskirche Hannover). The church senate assumed the rights of the previous territorial lords and took over responsibility for the abbey.

== World War II ==
In World War II the buildings were severely damaged, including the outer ring wall, on 8 April 1945, when the premises were heavily bombed by American troops in pursuit of fleeing SS units. The church sustained particularly heavy damage, and the south side of the nave and the east window of 1350 were totally destroyed. Restoration work took place from 1954 to 1959.

== Revival ==
In 1960 Christhard Mahrenholz was appointed 54th abbot, assembled a community and founded a society of laymen, Familiaritas. The community, as at 2008, consists of the abbot and eight religious, while the lay brotherhood "Familiaritas" has about 30 members.

== Abbots ==
- Heinrich I (1141–43)
- Everhelm (c. 1150–84)
- Johann I (1186)
- Hoiko (1196–1201)
- Walbert (1204/5)
- Konrad (1209)
- Gottschalk (1213–35)
- Dietrich (1236–45)
- Johann II (1246–51)
- Arnold (1254–69)
- Moritz (1270–91)
- Balduin (1293–1301)
- Bertram (1302–11)
- Gieseler (1317–22)
- Ludolf I (1326–29)
- Heinrich II (1334–37)
- Ludolf II (1339–53)
- Engelhard (1355–71)
- Johann (III) Maske (1377–78)
- Heinrich (III) Rikolf (1400–15)
- Reiner (1417–26)
- Herwig (1431–32)
- Johann IV (1433)
- Saner von Horn (1438–62)
- Johann (V) Alremann (1463–64)
- Heinrich (IV) von Horn (1465–77)
- Johann (VI) von Dassel (1477–83)
- Bernhard von Haselünne (1483–85)
- Werner von der Werder (1487–95)
- Gebhard Maske (1499–1510)
- Hermann Kannegießer (1516–31)
- Veit Teckermester (1533–53)
- Andreas Steinhauer (1555–88) – the first Lutheran abbot
- Vitus Buchius (1588–98)
- Anton Georgius (1598–1625)
- Theodor Berkelmann (1625–45)
- Statius Fabricius (1647–49)
- Hermann Topp(ius) (1655–75)
- Herbert Rudolphi (1676–84)
- Andreas Overbeck (1685–86)
- Andreas Rudeloff (1686–1701)
- Johann Georg Werner (1702–11)
- Christian Heinrich Behm (1712–40)
- Anton August Osterreich (1740–45)
- Theodor Wilhelm Ritmeister (1747–74)
- Johann Friedrich Häseler (1774–97)
- Jakob Christian Weland (1798–1813) – the abbey was dissolved during this abbacy
- Theodor Christoph Grotian (1814–29)
- Franz Heinrich Wilhelm Rägener (1831–37)
- Theodor Wilhelm Heinrich Bank (1840–43)
- Wilhelm Hille (1845–80)
- Karl Julius Franz Stausebach (1881–92)
- Johann Karl Theodor Schütte (1900–1912)
- position of abbot vacant (1912–1960)
- 1960–71: Christhard Mahrenholz – re-founder
- 1971–89: Kurt Schmidt-Clausen
- 1989–96: Ernst Henze
- 1996–2002: Hans-Christian Drömann
- 2002– : Eckhard Gorka

== Sources and external links ==
- Amelungsborn Abbey official website (in German)
- Youtube.com: Amelungsborn Abbey Choir
- Photos
