= Monachorum =

Monachorum is a Latin word meaning "of the monks" which is used as a place name element for several places in the United Kingdom:

- Buckland Monachorum, in Devon, England
- Monte Monachorum, in West Yorkshire, England
- Prestwick Monachorum, in South Ayrshire, Scotland
- Zeal Monachorum, in Devon, England

The term is also used in a number of books:

- De opere monachorum, a treatise by Saint Augustine
- Historia Monachorum, a book by Timothy of Alexandria
- De opere monachorum, a book by Augustine of Hippo

== See also ==
- Consensoria Monachorum, an agreement among a group of people to establish a monastic community
- Cnemaspis monachorum, also known as Monks's rock gecko, is a species of gecko endemic to Malaysia
