= Religious brother =

Christian religious occupation

A religious brother (abbreviated Br. or Bro. as a title), also called a lay brother, is a lay male member of a religious community, usually having made vows of poverty, chastity and obedience. Equivalent to a religious sister, a religious brother typically lives in community and works in a ministry appropriate to his capabilities.

A brother might practice any secular occupation. Some religious institutes are composed only of brothers; others are made up of brothers and clerics (priests or ministers, and seminarians).

== History ==
As monasticism developed in the early days of Christianity, most monks remained laymen, as ordination to ministry was seen as a hindrance to the monks' vocation to a contemplative life. Guided by the Rule of St. Benedict, the main lifestyle they followed was either agricultural or that of a desert hermit. Various forces and trends through the Middle Ages led to the situation where monks were no longer following this manner of living. Instead, they were focusing primarily on the religious obligations of intercessory prayer, especially for donors to the monasteries. This was encouraged by a spiritual reliance among the general membership of the Catholic Church upon the prayers of monastics to achieve salvation.

One practical consequence of this situation was that the bulk of the physical work which needed to be done for the simple survival of the monastic community came to be done by men who volunteered their services on a full-time basis, and who followed a less severe regimen of prayer. Called donates or oblati, they were not considered to be monks, but they were nonetheless gradually accepted as members of the monastic community.

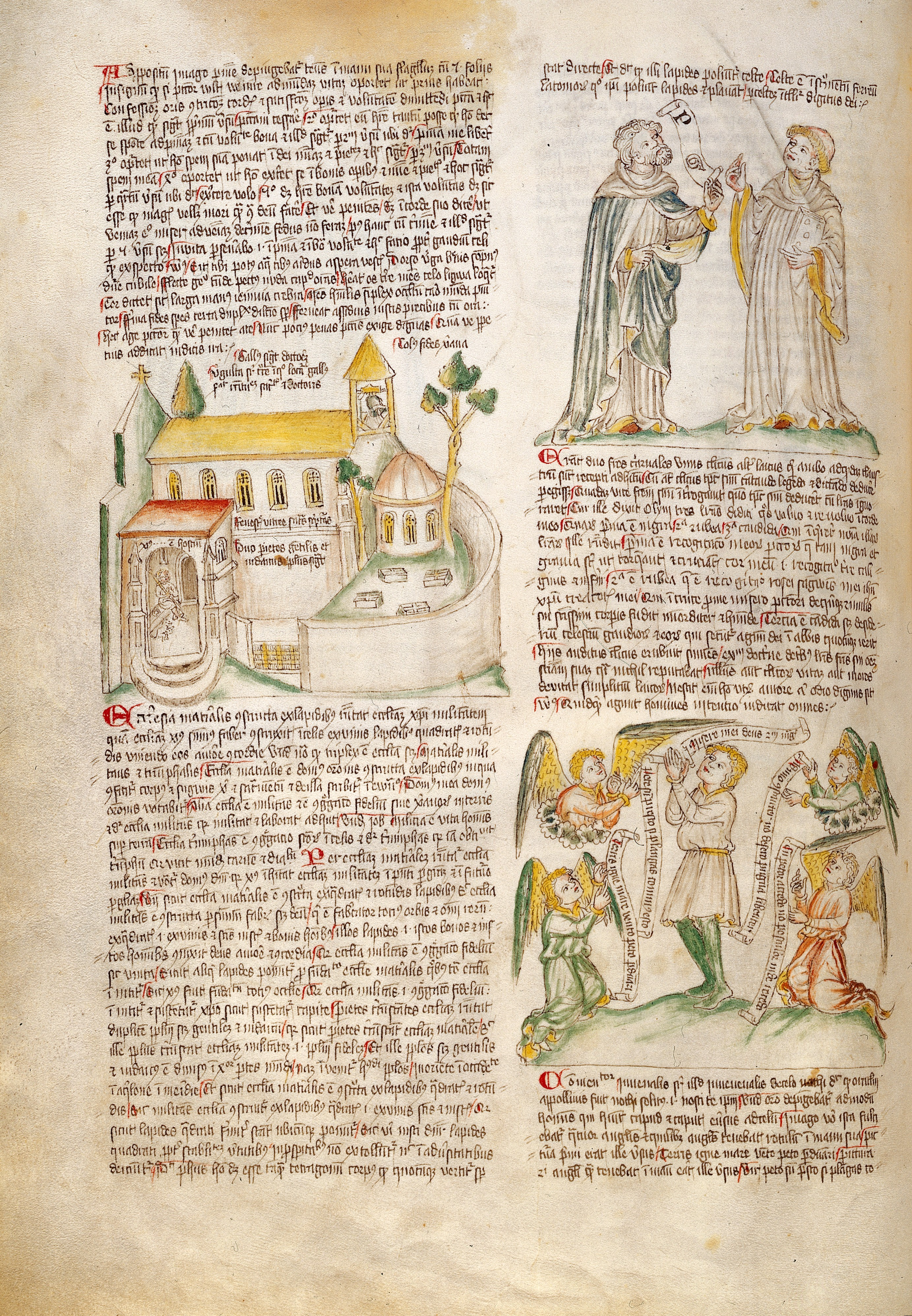
A church, a monk with lay brother & a praying man (from an illustrated medieval manuscript)

In other communities, a separate labor force of "lay brothers" or conversi was cultivated in order to handle the temporal business of the abbey. These men were professed members of the community but were restricted to ancillary roles of manual labor. A rigid class system emerged from this arrangement in which the clerics (priests and seminarians) exercised complete control over the lay brothers. In some cases, lay brothers received little or no formal education, could neither hold office nor vote within their communities, and were forbidden from passing from the lay to the clerical state. Lay brothers were distinguished from choir monks or friars in that they did not pray in choir, and from clerics, in that they did not prepare for holy orders. This specific definition is no longer applied by the Catholic Church.

Lay brothers played a crucial role in maintaining the upkeep of facilities, performing community service work, and providing technical and administrative expertise to assist with the mission of their order, while clerics typically focus on preaching, liturgy, and leadership.

"In early Western monasticism, there was no distinction between lay and choir religious. The majority of St. Benedict's monks were not clerics, and all performed manual labour, the word conversi being used only to designate those who had received the habit late in life, to distinguish them from the oblati and nutriti. But, by the beginning of the 11th century, the time devoted to study had greatly increased, thus a larger proportion of the monks were in Holy Orders, even though great numbers of illiterate persons had embraced the religious life. At the same time, it was found necessary to regulate the position of the famuli, the hired servants of the monastery, and to include some of these in the monastic family. So in Italy the lay brothers were instituted; and we find similar attempts at organization at the Abbey of St. Benignus at Dijon, under William of Dijon (d. 1031) and Richard of Verdun (d. 1046), while at Hirschau Abbey, Abbot William (d. 1091) gave a special rule to the fratres barbati and exteriores."

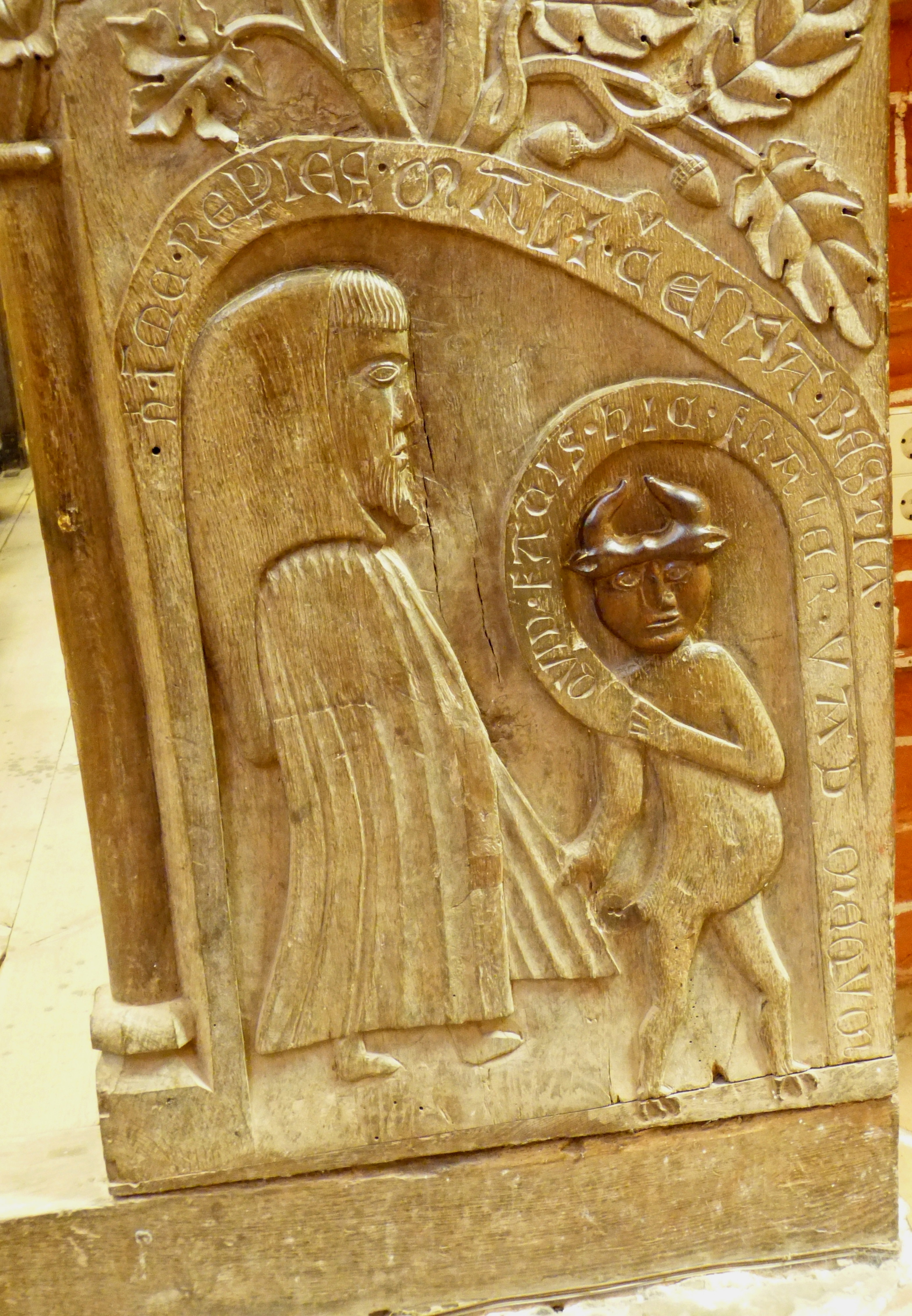
A misericord in the choir stalls for lay brethren (1280s) at Bad Doberan minster - Temptation of a lay brother by the devil

Leslie Toke writes in the Catholic Encyclopedia (1910) that

At Cluny Abbey the manual work was relegated mostly to paid servants, but the Carthusians, the Cistercians, the Order of Grandmont, and most subsequent religious orders possessed lay Brothers, to whom they committed their secular cares. In particular, at Grandmont, the complete control of the order's property by the lay brothers led to serious disturbances, and finally to the ruin of the order; whereas the wiser regulations of the Cistercians provided against this danger and formed the model for the later orders. In England, the Benedictines made but slight use of lay brothers, finding the service of paid attendants more convenient.

Nonetheless, he adds that they are "mentioned in the customaries of the Abbey of St. Augustine at Canterbury and the Abbey of St. Peter at Westminster". Craig Lescher notes the Gilbertines, the Order of Grandmont and the Cistercians as providing historical examples of revolts carried out by lay brothers.

In 1965, the Second Vatican Council issued the document Perfectae Caritatis, which called upon all religious institutes to re-examine and renew their charism. As part of the subsequent reforms and experimentation, many of the distinctions between lay and choir religious in terms of dress and spiritual regime were abolished or mitigated. In many religious institutes, lay and choir religious wear the same habit.

=== Life as a lay brother ===
Lay brothers were found in many religious orders. Drawn from the working classes, they were pious and hardworking people, who though unable to achieve the education needed to receive holy orders, were still drawn to religious life and were able to contribute to the order through their skills. Some were skilled in artistic handicrafts, others functioned as administrators of the orders' material assets. In particular, the lay brothers of the Cistercians were skilled in agriculture, and have been credited for the tilling of fertile farmland.

Lay brothers were sometimes distinguished from their brethren by some difference in their habit: for instance, the Cistercian lay brother previously wore a brown tunic, instead of white, with the black scapular; in choir they wore a large cloak, instead of a cowl; the Vallombrosan lay brothers wore a cap instead of a hood, and their habit was shorter; the English Benedictine lay brothers wore a hood of a different shape from that of the choir monks, and no cowl; a Dominican lay brother would wear a black, instead of a white, scapular. In some orders they were required to recite daily the Little Office of the Blessed Virgin Mary, but usually their labor in the fields (and hence away from the church) prevented them from participating in the Liturgy of the Hours. Lay brothers would instead pray Paters, Aves, and Glorias.

A great number of lay brothers left religious life in the years following the Second Vatican Council. Bruce Lescher notes that, as of 1990, departures were proportionately greater among lay brothers compared to both religious sisters and ordained clergy.

=== Lay sisters ===
In religious institutes for women, the equivalent term was lay sister. Lay brothers were originally created to allow those who were skilled in particular crafts or did not have the required education to study for holy orders to participate in and contribute to the life of a religious order. Lay sisters were found in most of the orders of women, and their origin, like that of the lay brothers, is to be found in the necessity of providing the choir nuns with more time for the Office and study, as well as creating the opportunity for applicants with little education to enter the religious life. They, too, wore a habit different from those of the choir sisters, and their required daily prayers consisted of prayers such as the Little Office or a certain number of Paters.

The system of lay sisters seem to have appeared earlier than that of lay brothers, being first recorded in a ninth century hagiography of Saint Denis. In the early medieval period, there was also mention of lay brothers attached to convents of women and of lay sisters attached to monasteries. In both configurations, the two sexes were strictly kept separate, housed in distinct buildings. This arrangement, however, has since been long abolished.

== Anglicanism ==
In the Anglican Communion, the term "brother" is also used to refer to non-ordained members of a religious order, such as the Little Brothers of Francis.

== Catholicism ==
=== Development of male religious congregations ===
In the 17th century, education of the poorer classes began to be seen as a means of practicing charity, which had always been a mandate of Christianity. A leading figure of this approach was St. Jean Baptiste de la Salle, a canon of Reims Cathedral, who began to help the poor children of the city. As he was gradually drawn into education as a means for this purpose, he established a new congregation of men for this work, who were called the Institute of the Brothers of the Christian Schools or De La Salle Brothers. De la Salle had initially intended the Institute to be composed of both ordained and lay members, but the death of the candidates he sent to Rome for ordination while en route convinced him to keep the Institute composed only of laymen. Thus the establishment of a recognized status of "brother" as other than an agricultural laborer came to emerge in the Church.

The establishment of other congregations of brothers started to boom during the 17th century.

The social devastations of the 18th and 19th centuries saw the gradual emergence of other similar congregations of men, dedicated primarily to education. Other examples of such congregations are the Marist Brothers, the Brothers of Holy Cross, the Brothers of Christian Instruction of St Gabriel (Gabrielites), and the Congregation of Christian Brothers.

=== Religious brothers today ===
The Second Vatican Council (1962–1965) called for the "adaptation" and "renewal" of religious life in a decree on this subject, published on 28 October 1965, and noted also the connection between the work of religious brothers and sisters and the apostolate of lay people:

"Religious Brothers and Sisters should value the apostolic works of the laity and willingly devote themselves to promoting lay enterprises".

The Council also entrusted to all clergy a role in helping religious men and women, "that they may persevere in the grace of their vocations".

Since the Council many brothers have moved toward professional and academic occupations, especially in the areas of nursing, education, peace, and justice. Brothers in communities with priests and seminarians often undertake advanced studies and enjoy equal standing with ordained members. Today, most brothers such as in the United States serve in some type of professional, technical, or academic ministry. Many serve as chaplains or teachers/faculty members at schools and universities run by their respective orders. In addition, most brothers undertake some studies in spirituality, religious studies, and theology.

Today there are more opportunities than ever for brothers in the Church. Brothers can be members of congregations that are made up only of brothers or they may belong to communities which include seminarians and priests. These congregations may be primarily contemplative or apostolic in nature; many try to balance both aspects of religious life. Brothers in the United States and elsewhere have access to an advanced education that is suited to their interests and talents. In mixed communities, brothers may collaborate with seminarians and priests or may minister independently of them. Brothers share equal status and rights with seminarians and priests in their communities with the exception that canon law currently requires that mixed communities elect an ordained minister as provincial; however, some dispensations to this rule have been granted. Brothers may be elected to provincial councils and other leadership positions.

In the United States, the National Association of Religious Brothers was established in 1971, with Brother Bonaventure Scully C.F.X. as its first president. The association is now known as the Religious Brothers Conference, describing its purpose as "to give visibility to the special charism and vocation of the religious Brother". The conference most recently met at the Pallatoine Retreat and Conference Center in Florissant, Missouri, in July 2025.

The most acceptable term currently for the brother's vocation is "religious brother", sometimes abbreviated as "Bro." or "Br." The generic use of the term "brother" to describe fraternal or spiritual relationships between men in communities can sometimes lead to confusion about what it means to be a "brother" (religious). According to canon law, brothers are neither "lay nor clerical" but instead belong to the religious state of life. Hence, the vocational title "brother" is generally not used by seminarians (other than in monastic or mendicant orders) in order to avoid the impression that being a brother is a developmental phase of clerical formation. (Note: Craig Lescher CSC suggests that there are places where seminarians are referred to as "brothers" in this way.) However, as equal members of the same community, both priests and brothers would consider themselves brothers in the fraternal, communal sense of the term.

The term lay brother in canon law simply means "not clerical" or "not ordained".

=== Religious brothers who have been proclaimed saints ===
Religious brothers who have been canonized as saints include:

- Alphonsus Rodriguez, SJ, porter
- Bernard of Corleone, OFMCap
- Conrad of Parzham, OFMCap
- Crispin of Viterbo, OFMCap
- Didacus of Alcalá
- Felix of Cantalice, OFMCap, who was the first Capuchin friar to be canonized in the history of the order
- Francis Mary of Camporosso, OFMCap
- Gerard Majella, CSsR
- Ignatius of Laconi, OFMCap
- John of God, Brothers Hospitallers of St. John of God
- Juan Macias, OP
- Richard Pampuri, Brothers Hospitallers of St. John of God
- Martin de Porres, OP
- André Bessette, CSC, Canadian founder of Saint Joseph's Oratory in Montreal
- René Goupil, SJ, missionary and martyr
- Albert Chmielowski, Polish founder of a congregation of brothers and another of religious sisters of the Third Order Regular of Saint Francis, which both bear his name.
- Bénilde Romançon, FSC, a French educator, who was the first member of his religious institute to be canonized
- Martyrs of Turon, eight Spanish Brothers of the Christian Schools executed during the Spanish Civil War
- Jaime Hilario, FSC, executed during the Spanish Civil War
- Miguel Febres Cordero, FSC, an Ecuadorian educator
- Mutien-Marie Wiaux, FSC, a Belgian educator
- Paschal Baylon, OFM

=== Religious brothers who have been beatified ===
- Isidore De Loor, Passionist, a Belgian brother
- Edmund Ignatius Rice, founder of the Congregation of Christian Brothers and Presentation Brothers
- Dominic Collins, SJ
- José Olallo, OH
- Redemptus of the Cross, OCD
- Artémides Zatti, SDB
- István Sándor, SDB
- Henri Verges, Marist Brother

== Lutheran ==
In Lutheran Churches, brothers are monastics or members of religious orders.

== Methodism ==
In the Methodist Church, those who are called "Brothers" (Br.) are male monastics (e.g. votarists of Saint Brigid of Kildare Methodist-Benedictine Monastery) or members of a Methodist religious order (e.g. Order of Saint Luke).

== Orthodox ==
Brotherhoods in Eastern Orthodox and Greek Catholic traditions were lay brothers affiliated with individual autocephalous churches. Some of their focus was of an evangelical or theological character, but much of their activity was in fact secular. Their structure resembled that of medieval confraternities and trade guilds, and can be characterized as the Orthodox equivalent of Catholic religious orders.

== See also ==
- Consecrated life
- Religious sister
- Vocational discernment in the Catholic Church
- Oh, Brother!
