= Siegfried IV =

Siegfried IV may refer to:

- Siegfried IV von Algertshausen, Prince-Bishop of Augsburg in 1286–1288
- Siegfried IV, Count of Northeim-Boyneburg and Homburg
