= Bevern (Samtgemeinde) =

- Samtgemeinde
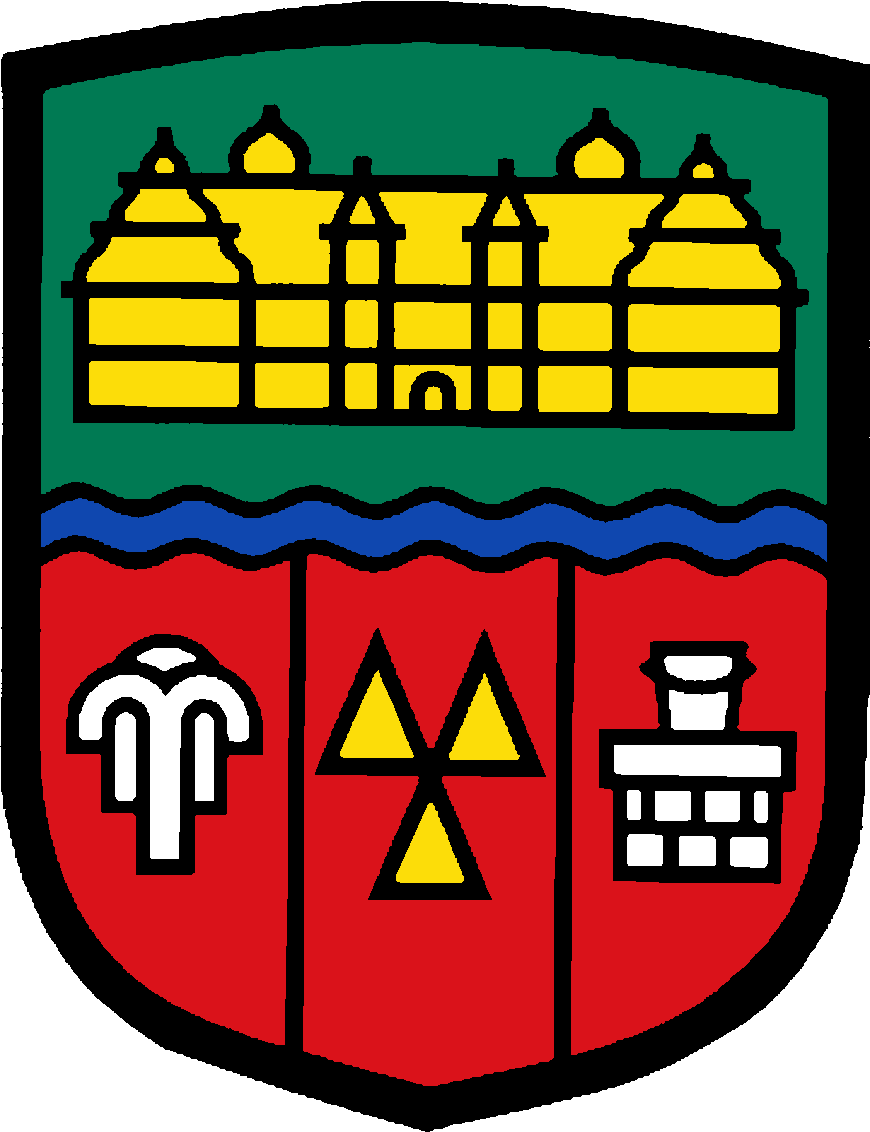
- Coat of arms

- Location of Bevern within Holzminden district
- Interactive map of Bevern
- Location within Germany Location within Lower Saxony
- Coordinates: 51°51′22″N 09°29′50″E
- Country: Germany
- State: Lower Saxony
- District: Holzminden
- Subdivisions: 4 municipalities

Government
  - Mayor (2019–24): Thomas Junker (CDU)

Area
  - Total: 66.30 km^{2} (25.60 sq mi)
- Elevation: 99 m (325 ft)

Population (2025-12-31)
  - Total: 5,655
  - Density: 85.29/km^{2} (220.9/sq mi)
- Time zone: UTC+01:00 (CET)
  - Summer (DST): UTC+02:00 (CEST)
- Postal codes: 37639
- Dialling codes: 05531
- Vehicle registration: HOL
- Website: www.bevern.de

Bevern (German pronunciation: [ˈbeːvɐn]) is a Samtgemeinde ("collective municipality") in the district of Holzminden, in Lower Saxony, Germany. Its seat is in the town Bevern.

The Samtgemeinde Bevern consists of the following municipalities:

1. Bevern
2. Golmbach
3. Holenberg
4. Negenborn
