= Holenberg =

- Municipality
- Location of Holenberg within Holzminden district
- Interactive map of Holenberg
- Location within Germany Location within Lower Saxony
- Coordinates: 51°55′N 9°35′E
- Country: Germany
- State: Lower Saxony
- District: Holzminden
- Municipal assoc.: Bevern

Government
  - Mayor: Angela Schürzeberg (SPD)

Area
  - Total: 7.36 km^{2} (2.84 sq mi)
- Elevation: 283 m (928 ft)

Population (2025-12-31)
  - Total: 398
  - Density: 54.1/km^{2} (140/sq mi)
- Time zone: UTC+01:00 (CET)
  - Summer (DST): UTC+02:00 (CEST)
- Postal codes: 37642
- Dialling codes: 05532
- Vehicle registration: HOL
- Website: www.bevern.de

Holenberg is a municipality in the district of Holzminden, in Lower Saxony, Germany.
