= Cnemaspis monachorum =

Conservation status
- Least Concern (IUCN 3.1)

Scientific classification
- Kingdom: Animalia
- Phylum: Chordata
- Class: Reptilia
- Order: Squamata
- Suborder: Gekkota
- Family: Gekkonidae
- Genus: Cnemaspis
- Species: C. monachorum

Binomial name
- Cnemaspis monachorum L. Grismer, Ahmad, Chan, Belabut, Muin, Wood & J. Grismer, 2009

Species of lizard

Cnemaspis monachorum, also known commonly as the monks' rock gecko, is a species of lizard in the family Gekkonidae. The species is endemic to Malaysia.

== Etymology ==
The specific name, monachorum (masculine, genitive, plural), is in honor of the monks at Wat Wanarum, Peninsular Malaysia.

== Geographic distribution ==
Cnemaspis monachorum is found in Pulau Langkawi, Kedah, Peninsular Malaysia.

== Habitat ==
The preferred natural habitat of Cnemaspis monachorum is rocky areas of forest.

== Description ==
Cnemaspis monachorum is a small species. Maximum recorded snout-to-vent length (SVL) for females is 32.9 mm (1.30 in). Males are even smaller, with a maximum SVL of only 31.4 mm (1.24 in).

== Behavior ==
Cnemaspis monachorum is diurnal, terrestrial, and saxicolous (rock-dwelling).

== Reproduction ==
Cnemaspis monachorum is oviparous. Clutch size is only one egg.
