= Siegfried IV, Count of Northeim-Boyneburg and Homburg =

Last Count of Northeim-Boyneburg and Homburg

Siegfried IV was the last Count of Northeim-Boyneburg and Homburg. He gave the land at Amelungsborn for the foundation (in the 12th century) of the future Amelungsborn Abbey, a Cistercian monastery, which was officially settled by a community of monks from Altenkamp Abbey.
