= Consensoria Monachorum =

In Christian monasticism, the Consensoria Monachorum, also known as the Regula Consensoria Monachorum, refers to an agreement among a group of people to establish a monastic community.

The agreement sets forth the terms of association, conditions for the admission of new members and the separation of old ones, the powers of the abbot, and the preservation of the community and its movable wealth in the event of violent assault from outside.

Some early medieval texts attributed the Consensoria Monachorum concept to Saint Augustine, but recent attributions point to later dates.
