= Order of Saint Luke =

- Logo of the Order of Saint Luke featuring symbols of the sacraments
- Abbreviation: OSL
- Formation: 1946; 80 years ago
- Founder: Romey Pitt Marshall
- Founded at: Methodist Building, New York City
- Type: Religious Order
- Purpose: A religious order in the Wesleyan tradition dedicated to sacramental and liturgical scholarship, education, and practice.
- Region served: United States, Singapore, Philippines, Europe
- Abbot: Sr. Heather Josselyn-Cranson
- Publication: Doxology, Sacramental Life, The Font
- Website: saint-luke.net
- Formerly called: Brotherhood of Saint Luke

The Order of Saint Luke (OSL) is a religious order begun within the Methodist Church in the United States that is dedicated to sacramental and liturgical scholarship, education, and practice.

As a Christian religious order, it is a dispersed community of men and women, lay and clergy, from many different denominations, seeking to live the sacramental life. "Membership in The Order is open to persons of all Christian denominations who seek to live the sacramental life in accordance with our Rule of Life and Service, in community with and acceptance of their brothers and sisters in the Order."

The Order gathers annually in mid-October for several days of worship, fellowship, and administration.

The Order proclaims itself as Wesleyan and Lukan in its spirituality, Methodist in its origins, sacramental in its practice, and ecumenical in its outlook.

== History ==
The Order of St Luke was founded in 1946 in the former Methodist Church and, until 2012, held the status of Affiliate Organization with the Section on Worship of the General Board of Discipleship of the United Methodist Church. The Order was formed under the leadership of the Rev. R. P. Marshall, a former editor of the Christian Advocate. It was dedicated to the cause of liturgical renewal, and led the way in a serious liturgical awakening across the Methodist Church and much of post-war Protestantism.

A maturing comprehension of liturgical renewal in an ecumenical era has become the guiding vision of members within the Order, just as it has become a dawning concern in the minds of many persons in the Church presently outside the Order. Recent evidence of this emerging vision may be seen in the design of the official worship books of many denominations.

The additional emphasis of directed spiritual formation, adopted in 1980, sets the direction in which the Order believes itself called.

While it will shun doctrinaire positions, the Order is dedicated to the task of breaking down the barriers of historical ignorance, theological sectarianism and liturgical illiteracy in the Church. The Order has no special revelation about the future of the emerging ecumenical consensus, but will do what it can to encourage the people called Christian to look outward and work toward the greater Church which God is surely gathering for Christ' s sake from a broken Christendom.

== OSL Publications ==
A major ministry of the Order of Saint Luke is OSL Publications. This ministry specializes in providing printed resources for those who lead worship and scholarly resources for those interested in liturgical matters.

Publications include resources on liturgy, church architecture, prayer, theology, worship, spirituality, sacraments, and music.

OSL publishes three periodicals:

- Doxology - This is the annual journal with contributions from writers in the areas of liturgical and sacramental scholarship. It is a "juried" or "refereed" journal which offers a service to the academic world as well as those who are involved in the active practice of ministry in its many contexts.
- Sacramental Life - This journal is published four times a year. It is designed to provide theologically sound reports of developments from across the church-at-large. Rather than have a theoretical or scholarly approach, the articles and liturgical aids have been practically proven and have grown out of the experiences of people "in the trenches."
- The Font - A once every two months in-house paper helping members to keep current on what is happening with their brothers and sisters around the world.

== Leadership ==
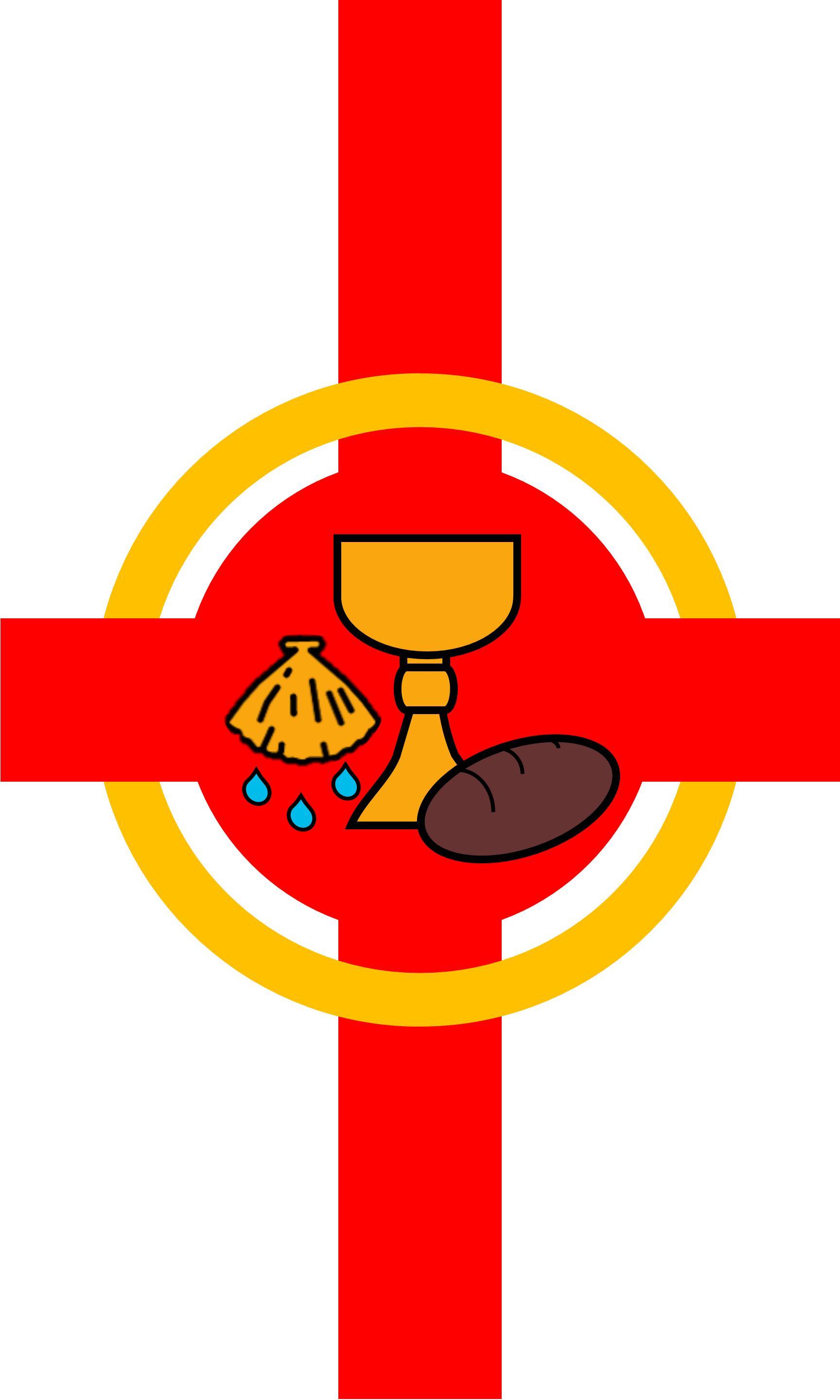
Banner of the Order of Saint Luke

General Officers

- Current Abbot- Sister Elizabeth Sue Moore (Invested on Oct 19, 2016)
- (most recent) Former abbot - Brother Daniel T. Benedict
- Prior-General - Brother George Crisp
- Chancellor-General - Sister Jeanette Block
- Provincial-General - Sister Heather Josselyn-Cranson

Appointed Officers

- Chaplain-General: Sr. Alice Kay Lovelace
- Webscribe: Br. French Ball
- Pastoral Care Officer: Br. David Eichelberger
- Companion for Inquirers and New Members: Br. Jim DuFriend
- Sacramental Life editor: Br. Jonathan Hehn
- Font Editor: Sr. Cynthia Astle
- Daily Office Revision Team leader: Br. Dwight W. Vogel
- Prior for Life-vowed Members: Br. Frank Coates
- Immediate Past Chancellor-General: Br. Scott Alford

== Chapters ==
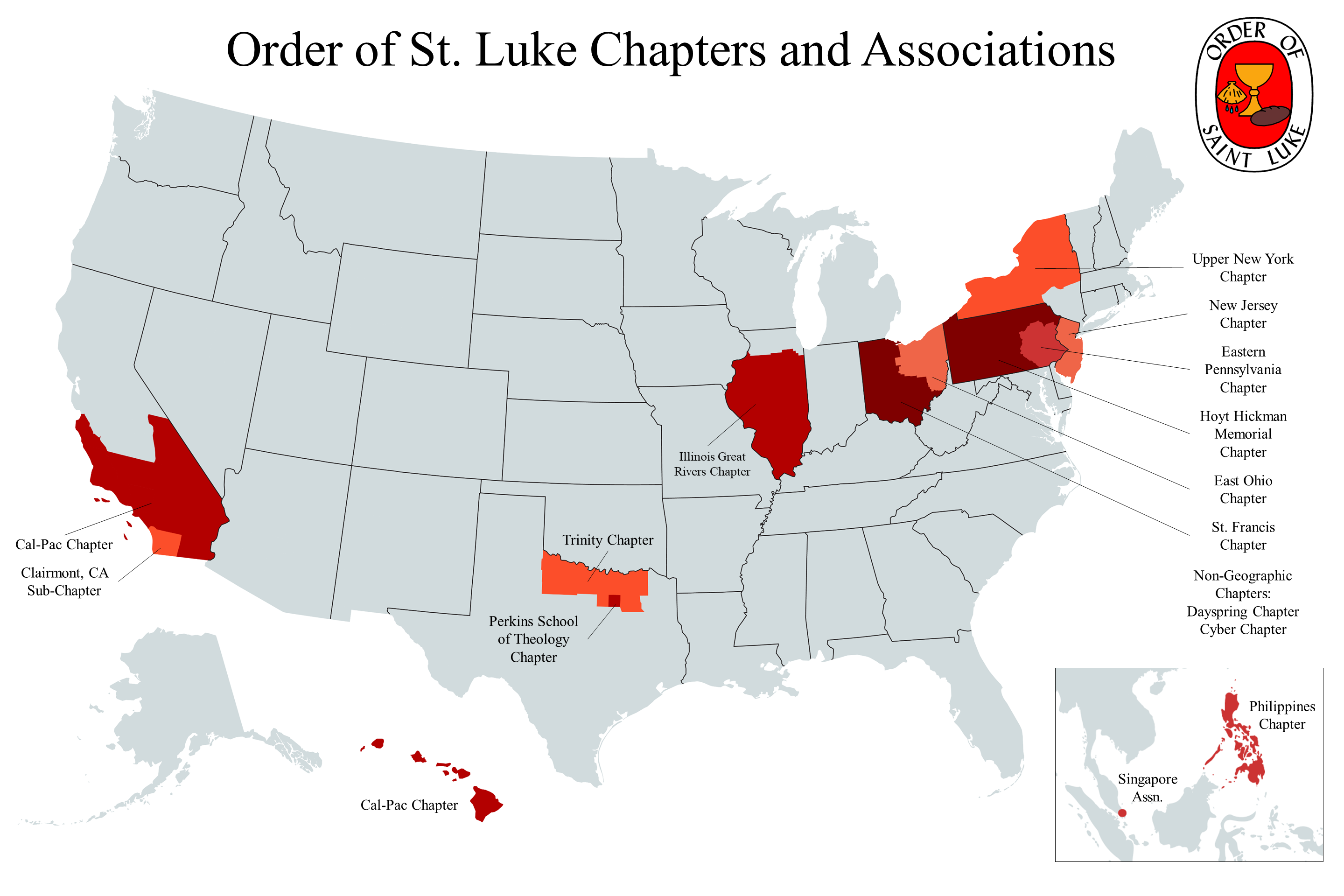
Map of the current chapters of the Order of St. Luke, Koinonia Chapter (Alabama) not pictured

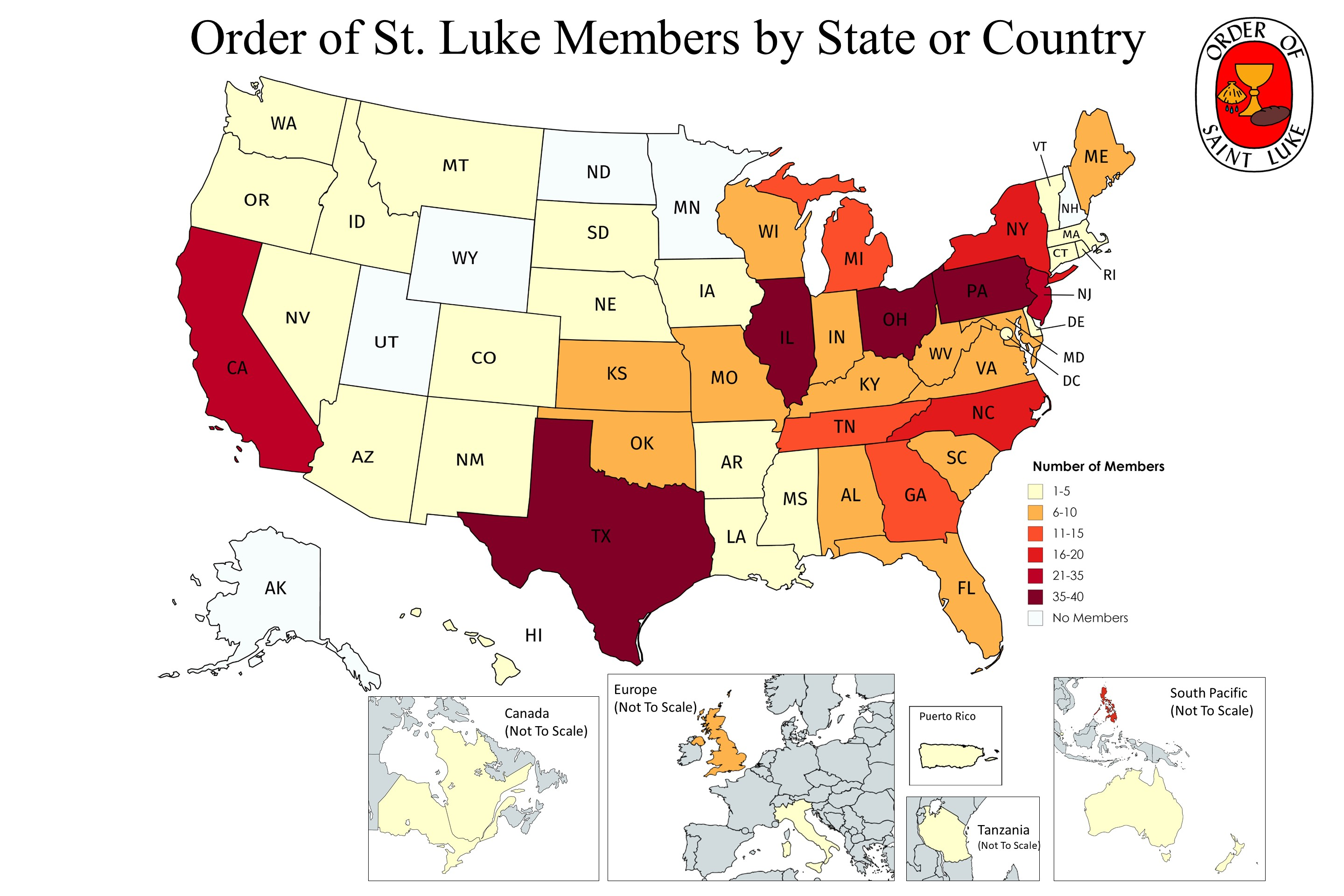
Order of St. Luke Member distribution by state and country

The Order of St. Luke maintains 15 active chapters and associations. While most are geographic, two chapters conduct meeting and business primarily or solely online. Chapters are led by chapter Priors and appointed officers.

North America

- California-Pacific Chapter, with a subchapter located in Claremont, CA
- East Ohio Chapter
- Eastern PA Chapter
- Illinois Great Rivers Chapter
- New Jersey Chapter
- Perkins School of Theology Chapter
- Hoyt Hickman Memorial Chapter (Western and Central Pennsylvania)
- St. Francis Chapter (West Ohio)
- Trinity Chapter (North Texas)
- Upper New York Chapter
- Koinonia Chapter (Alabama)

Asia

- Philippines Chapter
- Charles Mosebrook Chapter (Philippines)
- Singapore Association

Europe

- European Chapter

Non-Geographic

- Dayspring Chapter (using conference calls, non-geographical)
- Cyber Chapter (email and Facebook, non-geographical)

== Habit ==
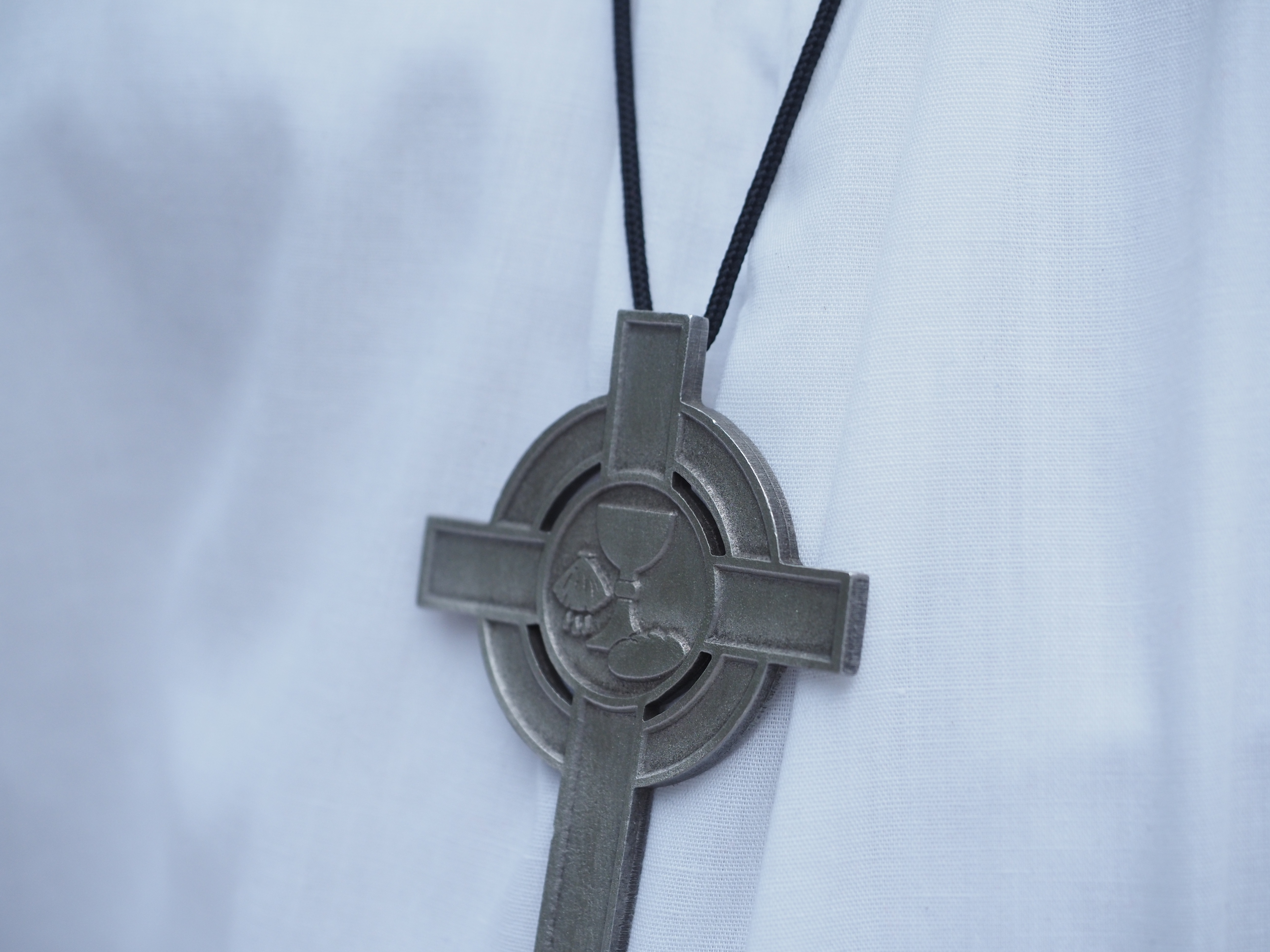
Pectoral Cross of the Order of St. Luke worn by a novice

The habit of the Order of St. Luke is voluntary. If worn, it includes:

- a white alb of unspecified style
- a red rope cincture knotted on the left side (optional)
- a red scapular with the OSL logo
- an OSL patch attached to the left sleeve of the alb

Many members also choose to wear a pectoral cross that bears the OSL logo. Novices are authorized to wear the alb and red cincture, and are given the scapular upon taking temporary vows.

== See also ==
- Saint Brigid of Kildare Methodist-Benedictine Monastery, the other Religious Order of the United Methodist Church
- Discipleship Ministries
