= Negenborn =

- Municipality
- Coat of arms

- Location of Negenborn within Holzminden district
- Interactive map of Negenborn
- Location within Germany Location within Lower Saxony
- Coordinates: 51°55′N 9°34′E
- Country: Germany
- State: Lower Saxony
- District: Holzminden
- Municipal assoc.: Bevern

Government
  - Mayor: Hermann Harling (SPD)

Area
  - Total: 9.87 km^{2} (3.81 sq mi)
- Elevation: 190 m (620 ft)

Population (2025-12-31)
  - Total: 686
  - Density: 69.5/km^{2} (180/sq mi)
- Time zone: UTC+01:00 (CET)
  - Summer (DST): UTC+02:00 (CEST)
- Postal codes: 37643
- Dialling codes: 05532
- Vehicle registration: HOL
- Website: www.gemeinde-negenborn.de

Negenborn is a municipality in the district of Holzminden, in Lower Saxony, Germany.
