= Saint Brigid of Kildare Monastery (Methodist-Benedictine) =

Double monastery of the United Methodist Church n St. Joseph, Minnesota

Coordinates: 45°33′53.3″N 94°18′49.6″W

Saint Brigid of Kildare Monastery is a double monastery located in St. Joseph, Minnesota, United States. The guiding sources for the monastery include the Holy Bible and the Rule of Saint Benedict.

Consultations to explore the possibility of creating an ecumenical monastic community began in 1984 and led to the founding in 1999 of Saint Brigid of Kildare Monastery by Sister Mary Ewing Stamps, OSB, as a Methodist-Benedictine monastery for United Methodist women. The monastery was dedicated on the feast day of Saint Brigid in 2000 and both women and men, ranging in age from 23 to 82 years.
