= Holzminden prisoner-of-war camp =

German WWI camp in Lower Saxony

Coordinates: 51.832490°N 9.460941°E

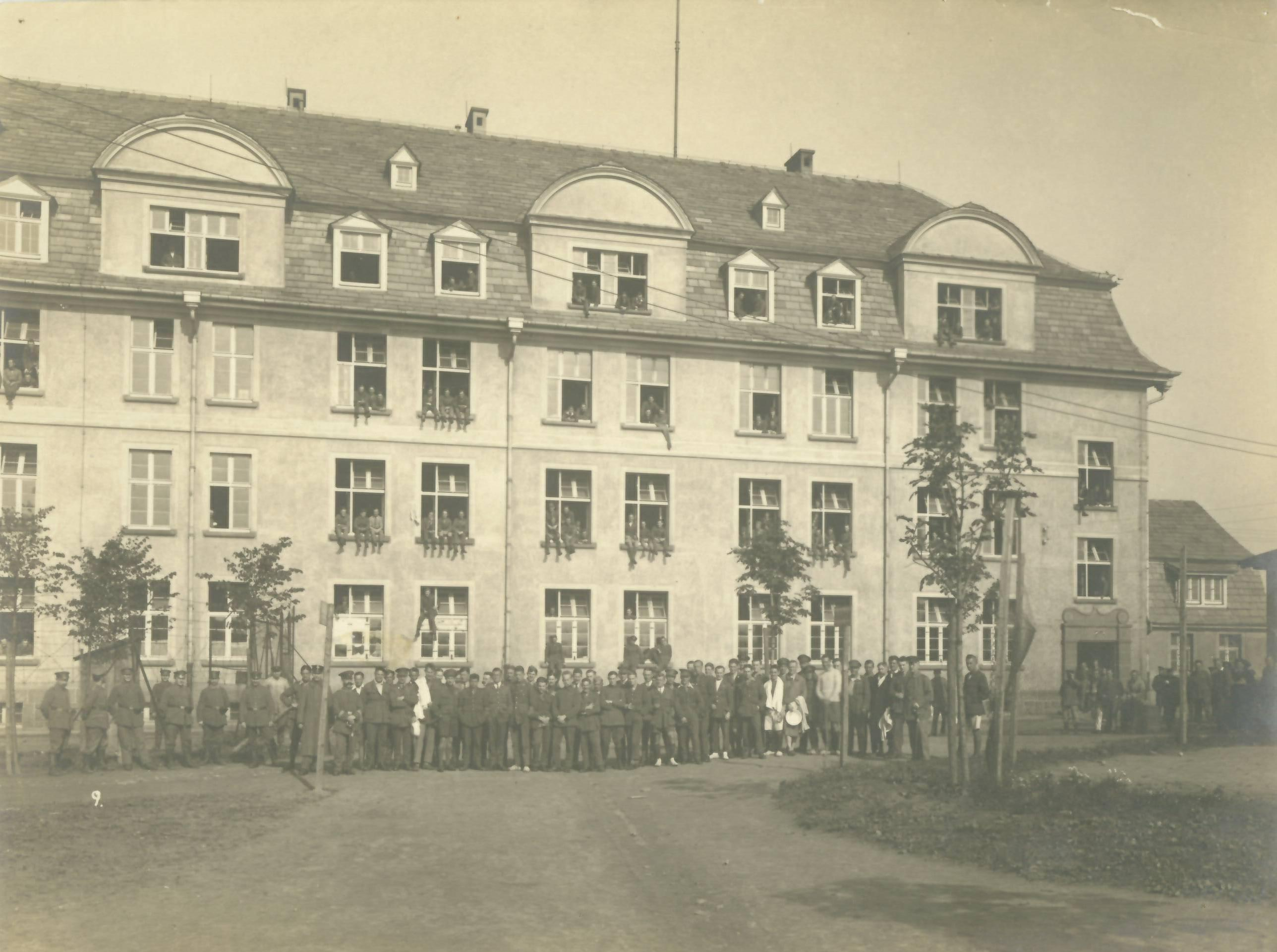
Kaserne B at Holzminden, with prisoners and guards

Holzminden prisoner-of-war camp was a World War I prisoner-of-war camp for British and British Empire officers (Offizier Gefangenenlager) located in Holzminden, Lower Saxony, Germany. It opened in September 1917, and closed with the final repatriation of prisoners in December 1918. It is remembered as the location of the largest PoW escape of the war, in July 1918, when twenty-nine officers escaped through a tunnel, ten of whom evaded recapture and managed to make their way back to Britain.

The prisoner-of-war camp is not to be confused with Holzminden internment camp, a much larger pair of camps (one for men, and one for women and children) located on the outskirts of the town, in which civilian internees were held. The internees mainly comprised Polish, Russian, Belgian and French nationals, as well as a small number of Britons.

== The camp ==
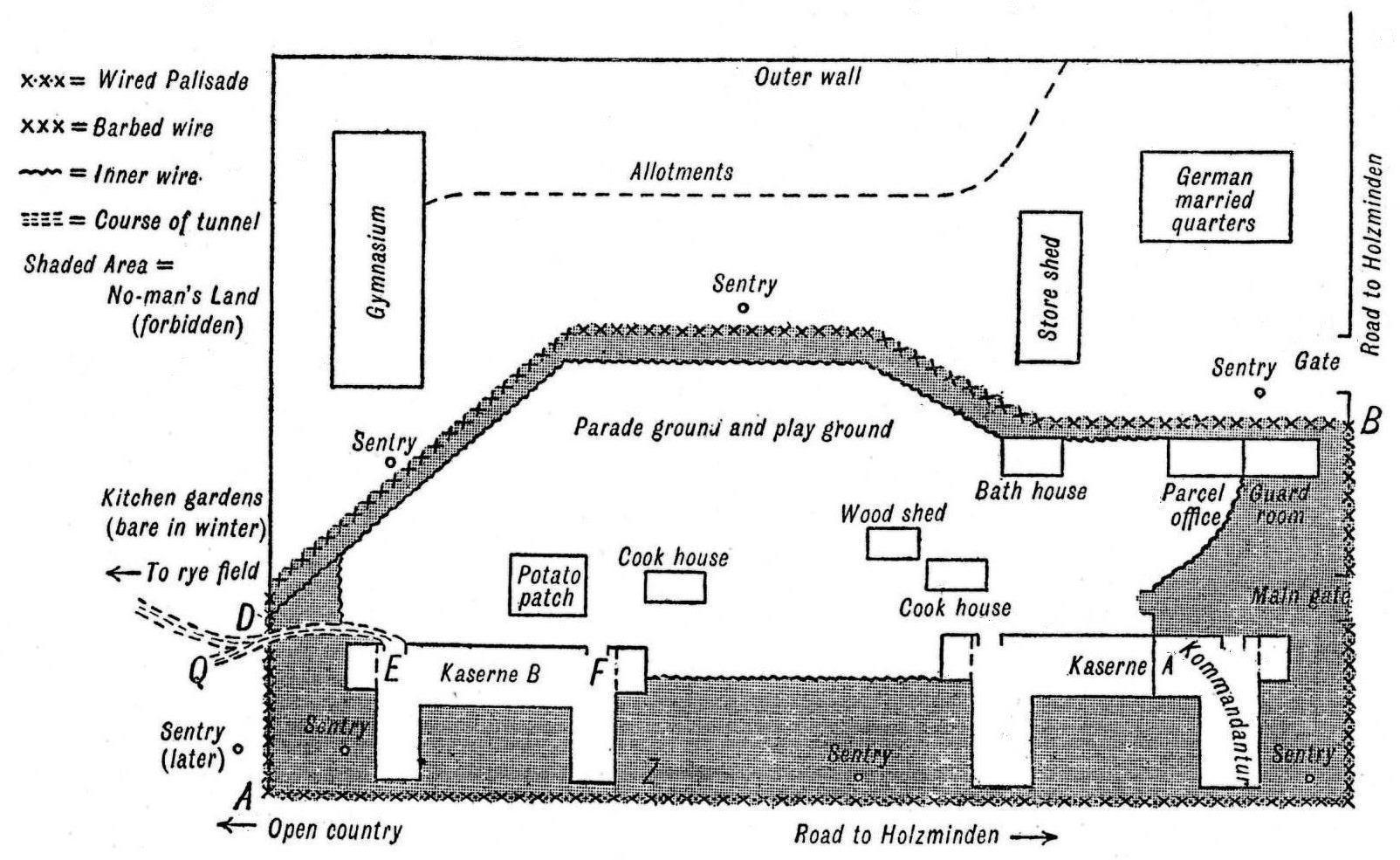
Plan of the camp by H. G. Durnford. South is at the top.

The prisoner-of-war camp opened at the beginning of September 1917, under the auspices of X Army Corps, headquartered in Hanover. Other camps for officers under the command of X Corps, all smaller, were those at Clausthal, Ströhen and Schwarmstedt. Many of the initial intake of prisoners were transferred from these camps and others at Freiburg and Krefeld, which had become overcrowded.

The camp held between 500 and 600 officer prisoners. There were also approximately 100–160 other ranks prisoners, designated orderlies: these men acted as servants to the officers and performed other menial tasks around the camp.

The camp occupied the premises of a cavalry barracks erected in 1913. The principal buildings, in which the prisoners lived, were two four-storey barrack blocks, known to the Germans as Kaserne A and Kaserne B, and to the British as A House and B House. Although the greater part of both blocks housed officer prisoners, both were partitioned internally: the western end of Kaserne A formed the Kommandantur, in which the German garrison was quartered; while the eastern end of Kaserne B was occupied by the orderlies. The basements included cells in which prisoners could be held in solitary confinement as punishment. Several wooden single-storey buildings in front of the barrack blocks accommodated service facilities, including the cookhouses, woodshed, bath-house, and parcel-room.

== Regime and camp life ==
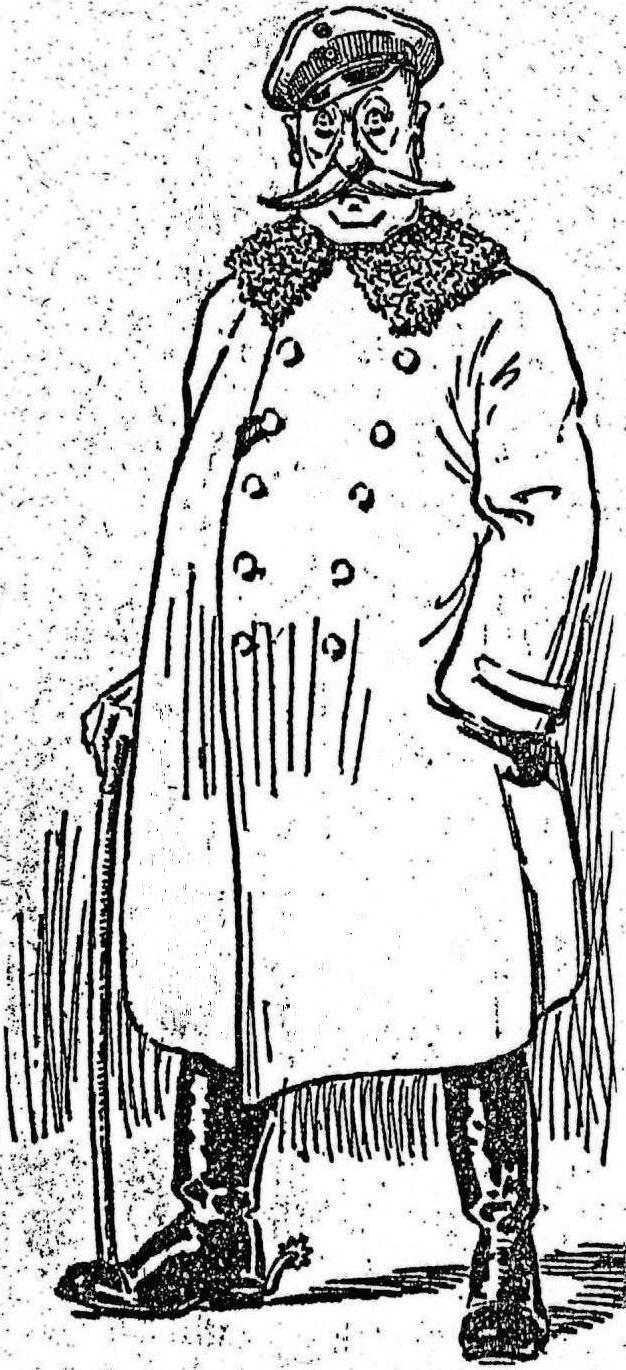
Caricature of Hauptmann Karl Niemeyer

The camps of X Corps came under the authority of General Karl von Hänisch, who encouraged a harsh regime. The Kommandant at Holzminden when it opened was the elderly Colonel Habrecht ("a kindly old dodderer of about seventy"); but he was replaced after less than a month by his second-in-command, Hauptmann Karl Niemeyer, who remained Kommandant until the camp's closure. Niemeyer's twin brother, Heinrich, was Kommandant of the camp at Clausthal. The brothers had lived in Milwaukee, Wisconsin, for 17 years – until the spring of 1917, when the United States entered the war – and as a result Karl Niemeyer spoke American English. However, in the view of the British POWs, Niemeyer's English was filled with errors and American slang terms. One POW mocked the Kommandant's English as "bar-tender Yank"; while another stated that Niemeyer "talked broken American under the impression that it was English". The prisoners constantly ridiculed him, and nicknamed him "Milwaukee Bill". One error, which became notorious, was his assertion that "You think I do not understand the English, but I do. I know damn all about you." Another occurred in March 1918, when he applauded the success of Germany's Operation Michael offensive, telling the prisoners that "Thousands of Germans are going west every day": to his surprise, this announcement was met with cheers.

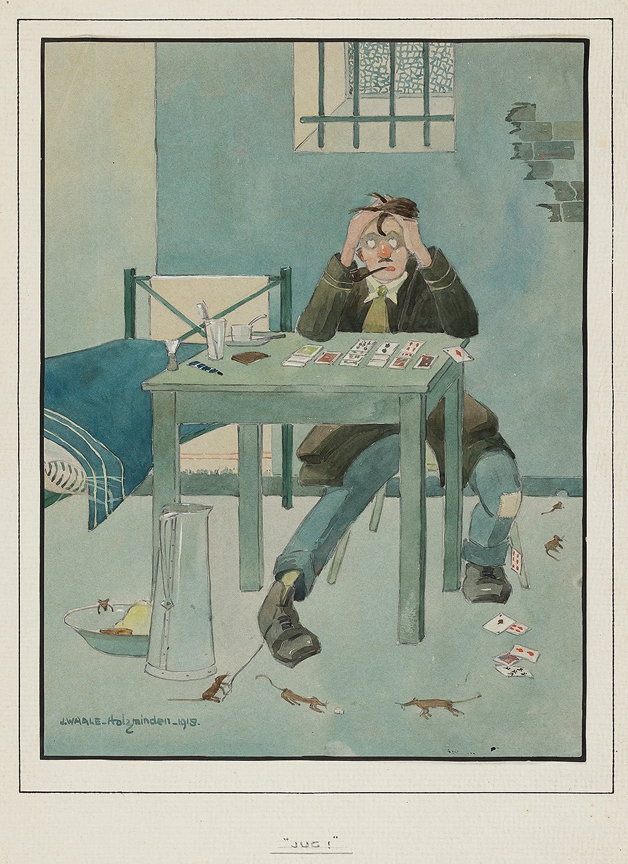
Cartoon by James Whale of a prisoner in "jug" (solitary confinement)

The camp was described by the Daily Sketch in January 1919 as "the worst camp in Germany". This assessment needs to be understood in context: as a rule, officer prisoners enjoyed a more comfortable regime than other ranks prisoners (see World War I prisoners of war in Germany). Nevertheless, Niemeyer's regime was often arbitrary and punitive, and atrocities were committed, including the bayoneting of prisoners. He was put on a British war crimes prosecution blacklist for the reported allegations of unnecessary ill treatment. Two "celebrity" prisoners who appear to have been singled out for harsh treatment were William Leefe Robinson (who had shot down a German airship over Britain, and who spent much of his time at Holzminden in solitary confinement), and Algernon Bird, the 61st victim of Baron von Richthofen. Robinson died in England in December 1918 from the effects of the Spanish flu pandemic but the Daily Express was in no doubt that he was "in reality driven to death by the notorious Niemeyer.... He was murdered by Niemeyer, who was resolved to employ every instrument of cruelty against him".

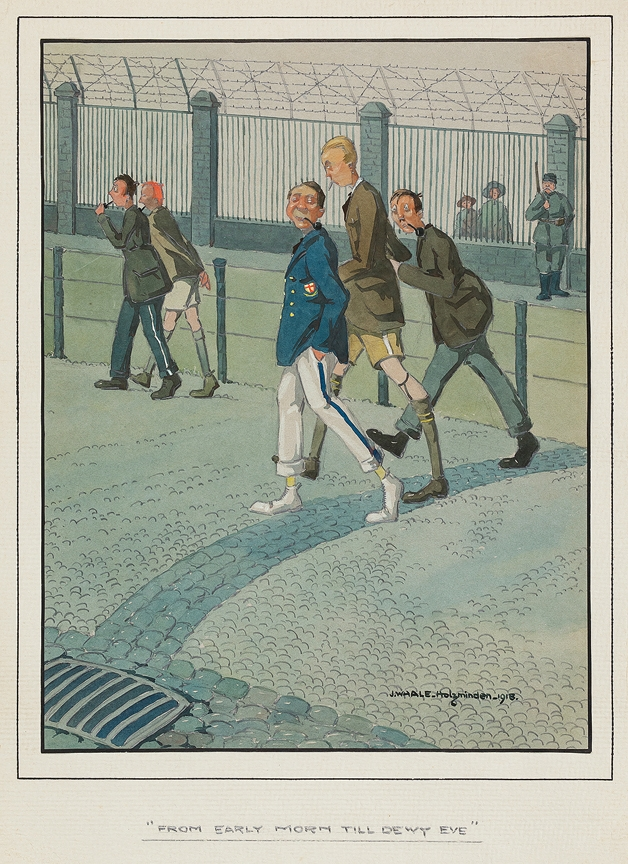
"From Early Morn to Dewy Eve": cartoon by James Whale of prisoners exercising on the parade ground

One deprivation suffered by the prisoners was a poor diet, although again this must be seen in context: as a result of the economic blockade of Germany, little food was available locally even for the civilian population. Prisoners were able to supplement their diet with the contents of parcels sent by their families at home and by the Red Cross and other humanitarian organisations. As a result, they were often better fed than the Germans. Prisoners were often able to use items of food to bribe their guards in return for lenient treatment or contraband equipment; while at other times they made a point of taunting their captors with the superiority of their material welfare, for example by drawing their full ration of German black bread only to burn it. Before the prisoners left the camp in December 1918, they made a bonfire of the furniture and everything else combustible: "it was a splendid sight and the Germans could only stand by helplessly, condemning the waste".

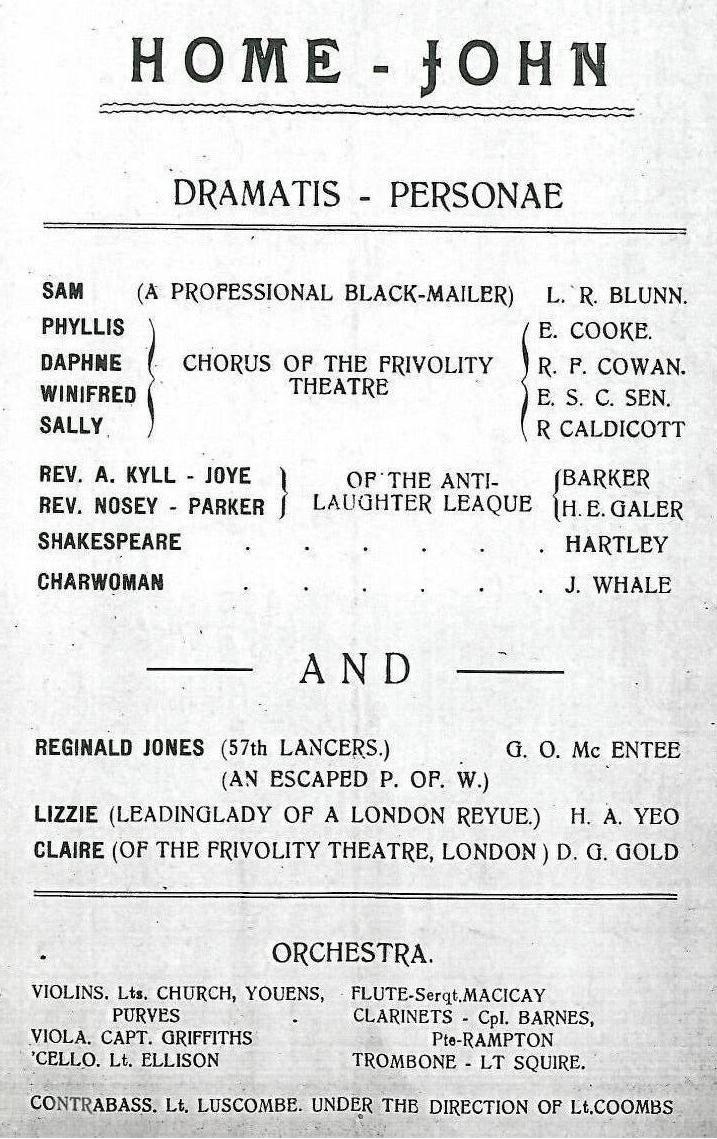
Cast list for "Home John", a revue performed in the camp on 27 July 1918. Erroll Sen appeared as "Winifred", and James Whale as "Charwoman".

Prisoners found a variety of ways of dealing with the enforced idleness and monotony of prison life. Activities included sports (football, hockey and tennis were played), concerts and plays, lectures, debates and reading. James Whale found the amateur theatricals, in which he participated as an actor, writer, producer, and set designer, "a source of great pleasure and amusement" and the audience reaction "intoxicating": it was his introduction to stagecraft, and he went on to become a leading Hollywood director. O. G. S. Crawford spent much of his time reading and studying, and later reported that he was "far less unhappy" at Holzminden than he had been at his public school, Marlborough College.

== Escapes ==
From the outset, numerous officer prisoners attempted to escape from the camp. Techniques included cutting through the perimeter fence and walking through the gates disguised as German guards, civilian workers, or (on at least one occasion) a woman. Many of these escapes were successful in the first instance but virtually all escapees were recaptured within a matter of days.

The largest and most celebrated escape was that made through a tunnel, on the night of 23/24 July 1918. The tunnel had been under excavation for some nine months. Its entrance was concealed under a staircase in the orderlies' quarters in Kaserne B. As officers were forbidden to enter the orderlies' quarters, the excavators had to reach it by disguising themselves in orderlies' uniforms. In the final weeks, a secret access door between the officers' and orderlies' quarters was created in the attic. Eighty-six officers were on the list of those waiting to escape but on the night, the tunnel partially collapsed on the thirtieth man, leading to the abandonment of the enterprise. Of the twenty-nine who escaped, ten made their way to the neutral Netherlands and eventually back to Britain. Among them was Colonel Charles Rathborne, the Senior British Officer in the camp, who – on account of his good German – was able to travel by rail without arousing suspicion, and managed to cross the Dutch border after only five days. The other escapees travelled on foot and most took at least 14 days. Edgar Henry Garland, one of the unsuccessful participants in the escape, went on to make a total of eight escape attempts.

== The camp today ==
Now surrounded by suburban development, the two main barrack blocks of the camp survive and are still in military use as barracks for the German Army.

== Notable prisoners ==
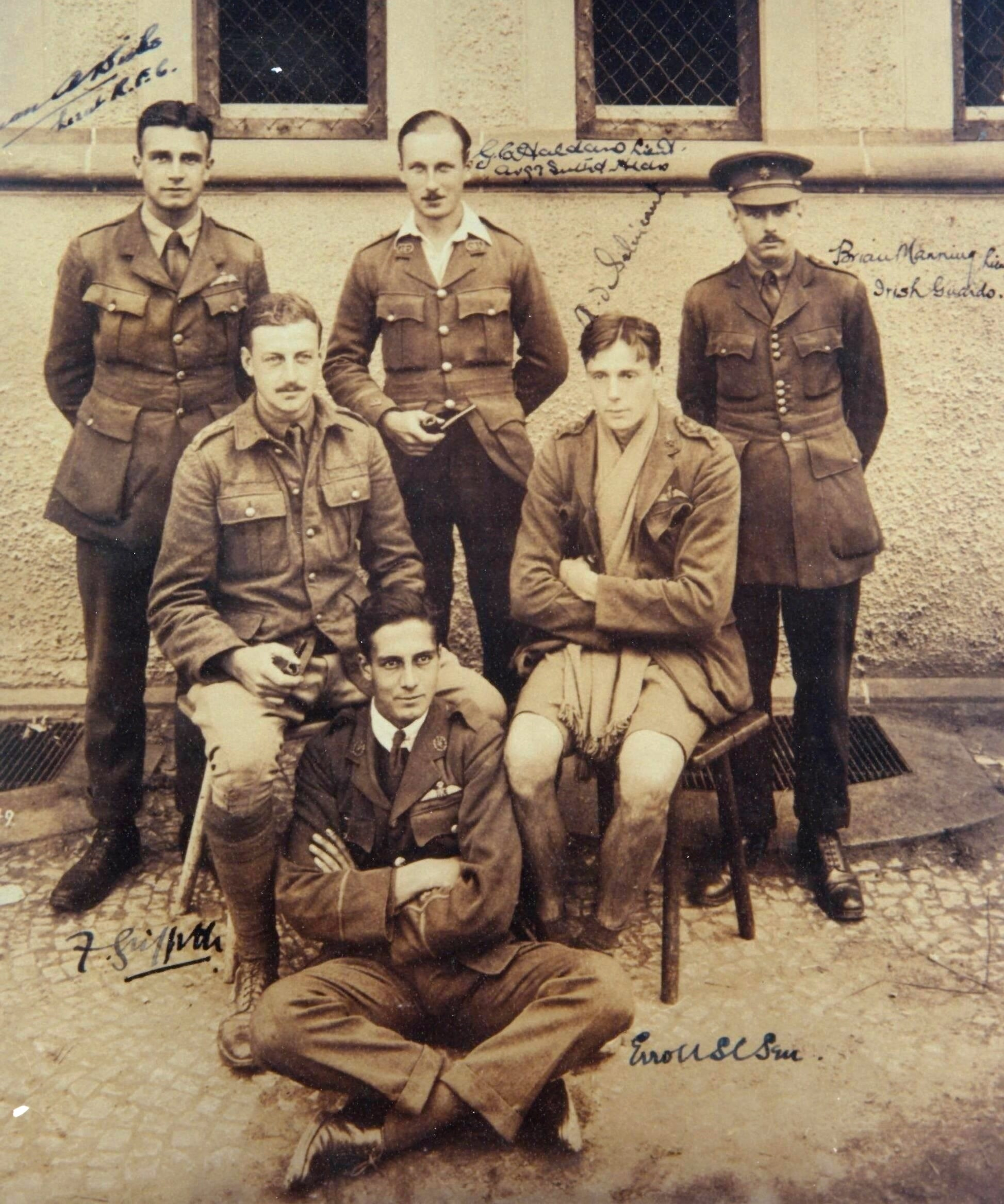
Prisoners at Holzminden, including Aubrey de Sélincourt (seated, right) and Erroll Sen (seated on ground)

- Edward Donald Bellew, VC (1882–1961), Canadian recipient of the Victoria Cross
- Commander Edward Bingham, VC, (1881–1939), Royal Navy recipient of the Victoria Cross
- Algernon Frederick Bird (1896–1957), 61st victim of Baron Manfred von Richthofen
- William Bloomfield, New Zealand architect
- Arthur Bourinot (1893–1969), Canadian lawyer and poet
- John Keith Bousfield (1893–1945), later general manager of the Asiatic Petroleum Company and member of the Legislative Council of Hong Kong
- Michael Claude Hamilton Bowes-Lyon (1893–1953), son of the 14th Earl of Strathmore and Kinghorne, and brother of the future Queen Elizabeth The Queen Mother
- O. G. S. Crawford (1886–1957), archaeologist
- Gerard Crole (1894–1965), Scottish international rugby union and cricket player
- Aubrey de Sélincourt (1894–1962), writer, classical scholar and translator
- Charles Eaton (1895–1979), later Royal Australian Air Force officer and diplomat
- Edgar Henry Garland (1895–1973), New Zealand aviator
- Christopher Guy Gilbert (1893–1973), 31st victim of Baron Manfred von Richthofen
- F. W. Harvey (1888–1957), poet
- Brian Horrocks (1895–1985), World War II British army general
- William Donald Patrick (1889–1967), afterwards Lord Patrick, Scottish advocate and judge, and later member of the International Military Tribunal for the Far East
- William Leefe Robinson, VC (1895–1918), first British pilot to shoot down a German airship over Britain
- Erroll Chunder Sen (1899 – after December 1941?), Indian military aviator
- William Stephenson (1897–1989), Canadian pilot, businessman, spy master, and one of the real-life inspirations for James Bond
- James Whale (1889–1957), later Hollywood film director
- F. W. Winterbotham (1897–1990), World War II intelligence officer

== Film ==
- A fictionalised treatment of the tunnel escape from Holzminden was filmed as Who Goes Next?, and released in March 1938. It was directed by Maurice Elvey, and starred Barry K. Barnes.
- A documentary film describing the 1918 escape, The First Great Escape, was produced by National Geographic in 2014.

== See also ==
- World War I prisoners of war in Germany
- List of prisoner-of-war camps in Germany
- List of prisoner-of-war escapes

== Bibliography ==
=== Memoirs ===
- Birks, Norman (1978). Gray, Barry (ed.). "PoW: the personal recollections of Lt Norman A. Birks, RFC". Cross & Cockade Great Britain Journal. 9 (1): 25–31.
- Durnford, Hugh (1920). The Tunnellers of Holzminden. Cambridge: Cambridge University Press.
- Crawford, O. G. S. (1955). Said and Done: the Autobiography of an Archaeologist. London: Weidenfeld and Nicolson.
- Harvey, F. W. (1920). Comrades in Captivity. London: Sidgwick & Jackson.
- Rathborne, Charles (2016). Barrass, Malcolm (ed.). "The First Great Escape?". Cross & Cockade International. 47 (2): 94–102.
- Whale, J. (July 1919). "Our Life at Holzminden". Wide World Magazine. 43: 314–19.

=== Secondary works ===
- Bascomb, Neal (2019) [2018]. The Escape Artists: a band of daredevil pilots and the greatest prison breakout of WWI. London: John Murray. ISBN 978-1-473-68681-6.
- Cook, Jacqueline (2012). "Holzminden Prisoner of War Camp and the Great Escape of 1918". Journal of the World War One Historical Association. 1 (3): 27–34.
- Cook, Jacqueline (2013). The Real Great Escape: the story of the First World War's most daring breakout. North Sydney: Vintage. ISBN 9780857981141.
- Hanson, Neil (2011). Escape from Germany: The Greatest PoW Break-out of the First World War. London: Doubleday. ISBN 9780385612043.
- Winchester, Barry (1971). Beyond the Tumult. London: Allison & Busby. ISBN 0850310571.
