= Erroll Chunder Sen =

Erroll Suvo Chunder Sen
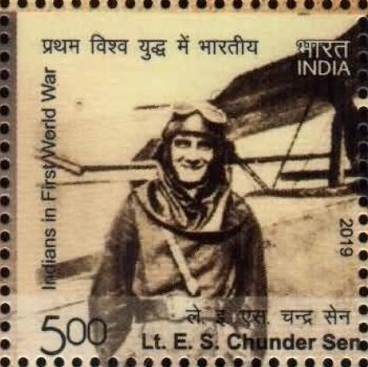
- Erroll Chunder Sen on a 2019 stamp of India
- Born: 13 March 1899; Bengal Presidency, British Raj
- Died: Unknown (c. December 1941?)
- Military career
- Allegiance: United Kingdom
- Branch: British Army (Royal Flying Corps); Royal Air Force
- Service years: 1917–1919
- Rank: Lieutenant
- Unit: No. 70 Squadron RAF
- Conflicts: World War I; Western Front
- Other work: Indian Imperial Police

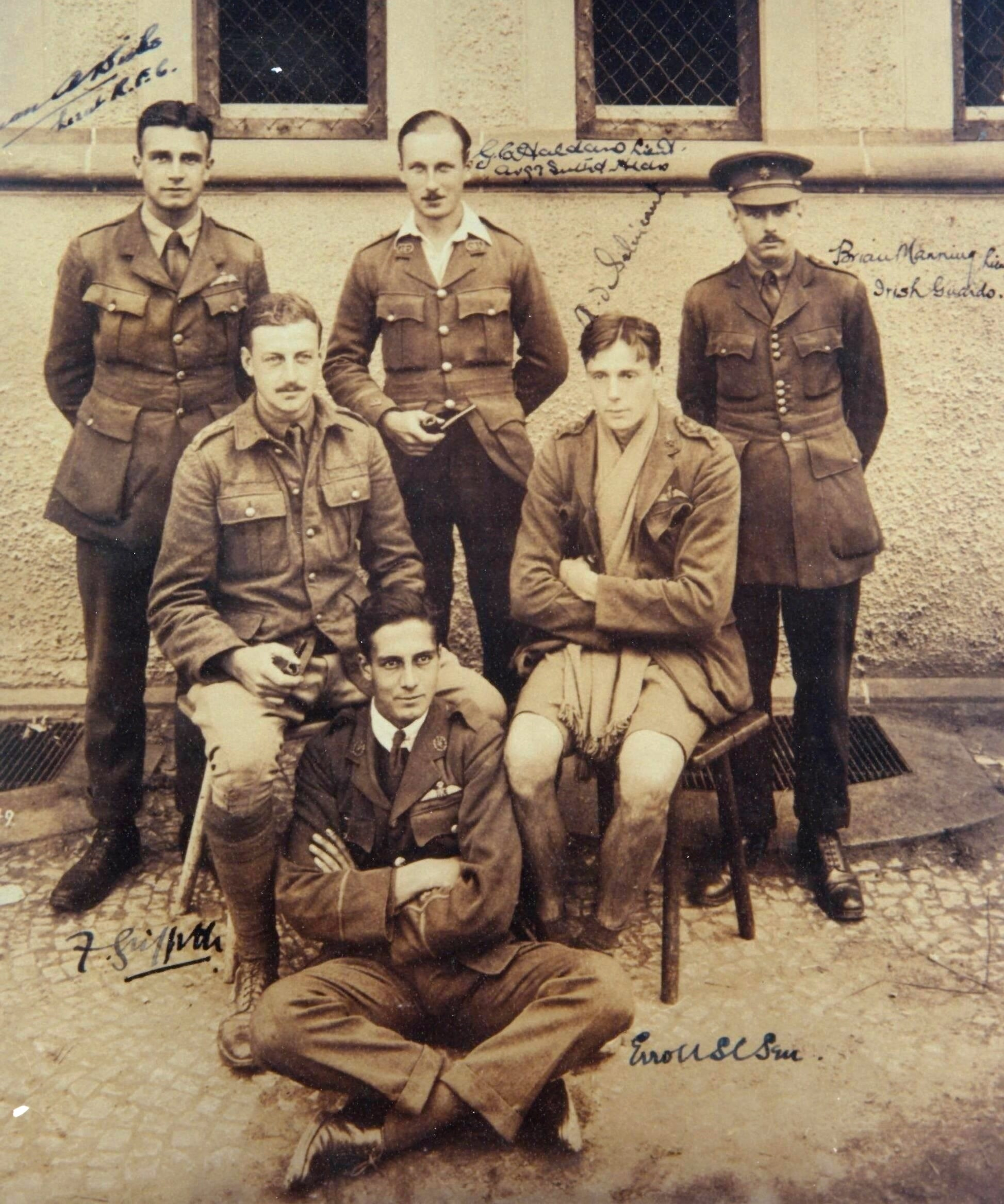
Erroll Sen, seated on ground, in Holzminden prisoner-of-war camp, c.1918

Erroll Suvo Chunder Sen (13 March 1899 – after December 1941?) was an Indian pilot who served in the Royal Flying Corps and Royal Air Force during the First World War, and who was among the first Indian military aviators.

== Family and early life ==
Sen was born in Calcutta to an Indian father and English mother. His grandfather was the philosopher and social reformer Keshab Chandra Sen; and his aunt was Suniti Devi, the Maharani of Cooch Behar. At an early age, he moved with his mother, brother and sister to England. He was educated at Rossall School in Fleetwood, Lancashire, where he joined its unit of the Officers' Training Corps.

== First World War ==
Sen applied for a commission in the Royal Flying Corps in November 1916, but his application was rejected as he was under age. After a period working in a bank, and having now turned 18, he made a second attempt in early 1917. This time he was successful, and he was awarded a temporary honorary commission in the RFC as a second lieutenant, with effect from 24 April 1917. He was ordered to report to the No. 1 School of Military Aeronautics at Reading from the same date.

After two months at Reading, followed by 25 hours of elementary flying training and 35 hours in front-line aircraft, Sen was posted to the Western Front. He was assigned to No. 70 Squadron RFC, based at Poperinge in West Flanders, Belgium and equipped with the Sopwith Camel. On 7 August 1917, he was appointed a Flying Officer in the RFC with the temporary rank of second lieutenant. A month later, on 14 September, while taking part in an offensive patrol, Sen experienced engine failure and dropped behind the rest of his patrol. As he stated later in a deposition for the War Office, "...in attempting to catch up [with the remainder of the patrol, I] was lost in a cloud. Coming out [I] was attacked by 4 enemy machines. Both [fuel] tanks [were] hit & [I] crashed outside Menin. Unwounded."

He was interned in Holzminden prisoner-of-war camp for the remainder of the war. He was a participant in the attempted mass escape from the camp on 23/24 July 1918, but was in the escape tunnel when it partially collapsed, resulting in the abandonment of the enterprise. He was eventually repatriated to the UK on 14 December 1918.

== Postwar years ==
Following his repatriation, Sen was promoted lieutenant on 17 April 1919, and was transferred to the unemployed list of the RAF on 23 May. He returned to India and joined the Indian Imperial Police as an assistant superintendent (junior scale, on probation) with effect from 20 September 1921. By 1925, he was serving in eastern Bengal in the Comilla District (now in Bangladesh).

Sen and his brother subsequently relocated to Rangoon, Burma, where they found work. Following the Japanese attack on Pearl Harbor in December 1941, Sen re-enlisted in the RAF, but was unable to find a means to leave Burma. He tried to walk out of the country, and is believed to have died in the attempt.
