= Edgar Henry Garland =

New Zealand army officer

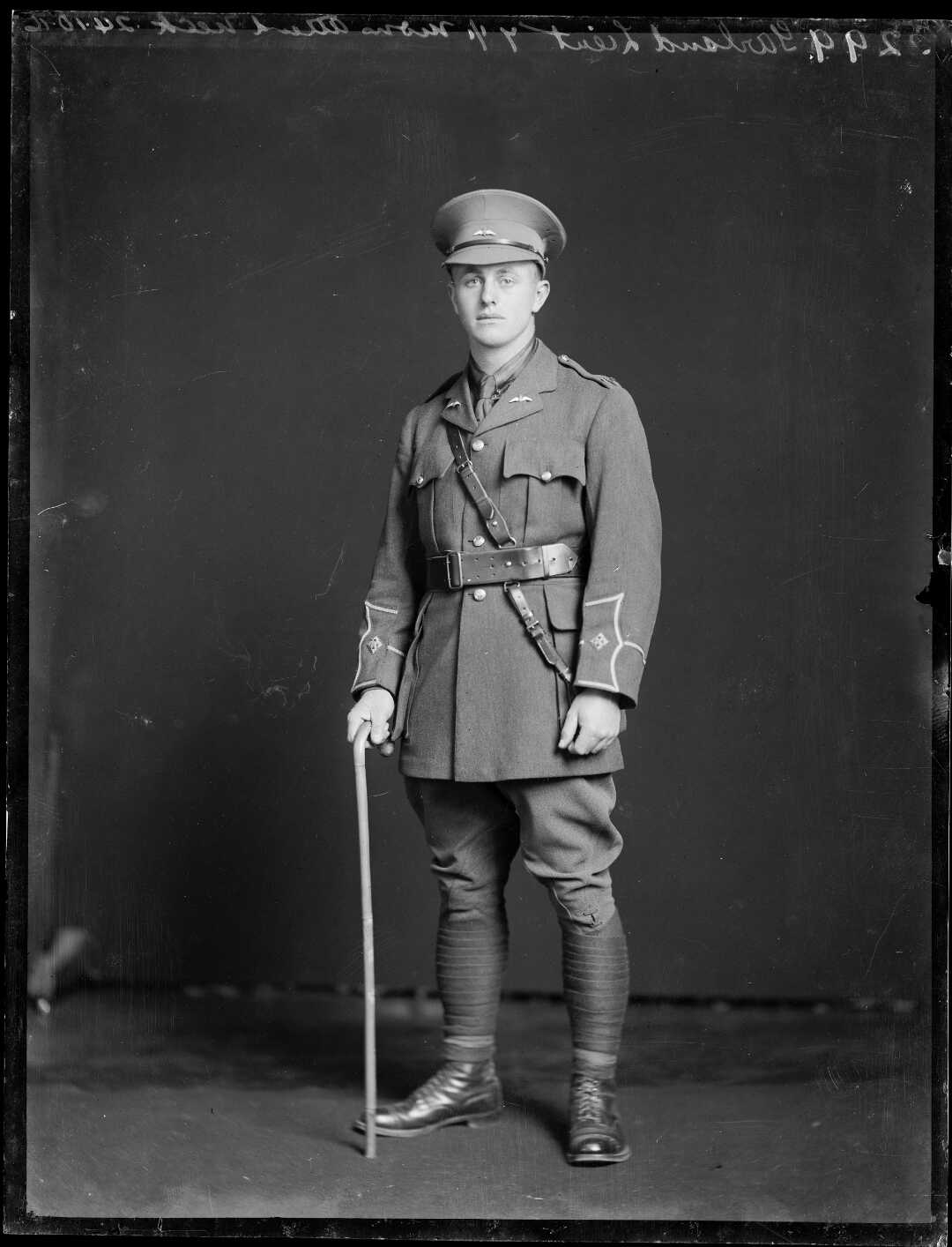
- Born: 1895; Wellington, New Zealand
- Died: 4 May 1973 (aged 78)

Edgar Henry Garland (1895 – 4 May 1973) was a New Zealand officer, known for numerous escapes from German prisoners camps during WWI. He was regarded as one of the most cunning and slippery of the British officers by the German War Office. He became a famous around the end of the war and got the nickname "The Elusive Garland".

== Biography ==
Garland was born in Wellington, New Zealand, in 1895. He was a New Zealand soldier in World War I. He trained as a pilot at the New Zealand Flying School at Kohimarama, Auckland in 1916. Garland was serving with Unit – RFC(SR) 66 Squadron, flying Sopwith Scout (Pup) B1767. He made twenty-four flights over the German lines before being shot down on 22 August 1917. He made a forced landing in Ostend and was interned at the Holzminden prisoner of war camp, reserved for British and British Empire officers. He participated in the largest POW escape of the war – the first "Great Escape" in July 1918. During this escape twenty nine officers escaped, but only ten made it out of Germany and, eventually, to Britain. Flight-Lieutenant Garland went on to make a total of eight escape attempts. As a result of these escape attempts Garland obtained the nickname "The Elusive Garland".

One of the early books about his escape attempts, published firstly in the early 1920s describes Garland:

The situation called for desperate measures, and fortunately the right man was at hand. A New Zealand Officer called Garland, who was high up on the waiting list, came up to the rendezvous to prospect. He happened to be about as strong physically as any other two officers in the camp, and possessed the biceps of a Hercules. He at once volunteered to go down and try to pull out the rear-most man. After about half an hour he succeeded in doing so, and the two collaborators in this severe physical exercise crawled back through the attic hole completely exhausted and dripping with sweat.

— H. G. Durnford, The Tunnellers of Holzminden (1920)

Garland was later held prisoner in Cologne and again attempted to escape. With the assistance of a fellow-prisoner who was a tailor, he managed to make a suit and hat. When the camp was visited by several civilians Garland donned his suit and hat, and, carrying a German newspaper, managed to walk out of the prisoner of war camp.

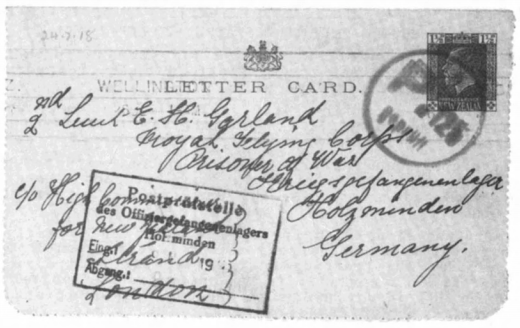
Letter card addressed to Garland

The Official Newspaper of the New Zealand Society of Great Britain published a letter card addressed to Garland from his mother. It was despatched from Wellington on 26 July 1916, but before it could reach him, he had been shot down and imprisoned at Holzminden. The card eventually reached him, via the High Commissioner in London, on 2 November 1918 – seven days before the Armistice that ended the war.

After the war Garland was sent to the United States as member of the British Military Mission. He subsequently accepted employment with a United States aeronautical company established by Henry Woodhouse.
