= Stiebel Eltron =

German central heating product manufacturer

- Type: GmbH & Co. KG
- Industry: Electrical industry
- Founded: May 5, 1924
- Headquarters: Holzminden, Germany
- Revenue: €700 million (2020)
- Number of employees: 4,000 (2020)
- Website: www.stiebel-eltron.de

Stiebel Eltron Group is a heating devices company based in Holzminden, Germany. The group is a manufacturer of electrical, hot-water, and heating appliances, as well as systems for utilizing renewable energy, heat pump heating systems, and controlled residential ventilation units with heat recovery.

The company dates back to 1924 in Berlin, when Dr. Theodor Stiebel founded Stiebel Eltron. Today it is a green energy low carbon specialist manufacturing ground, air and water source heat pumps. It further produces ventilation and air conditioning and systems technologies. The UK office was set up on the Wirral Peninsula in 2008.

Stiebel Eltron at Plumbex India 2026, BIEC

== History ==
Dr Theodor Stiebel founded the "ELTRON Dr. Theodor Stiebel" company at Reichenberger Strasse 143 in Berlin's Kreuzberg district with a base capital of 20,000 Reichsmark on 5 May 1924. According to the Commercial Register, the company began operating on the very same day. Dr Stiebel was loaned the capital for this by his uncles, Hermann Stiebel, who ran a hotel in Hamburg and Carl Reese who owned a metalworking business (canning factory) in Holzminden. With his patented invention of the first coil immersion heater, marvelled at by visitors to the 1924 Spring Trade Fair in Leipzig due to its rapid heat-up time and short cooling period, Dr Stiebel laid the foundations for the large-scale production that would begin one year later. The TLn coil immersion heater was initially manufactured by 10 employees working in two leased buildings at Reichenberger Strasse 143 and Oppelner Strasse 34 in Berlin. On 3 March 1925, production was moved to the third floor of Reichenberger Strasse 160. Initially, only immersion heaters under the "Eltro" brand were manufactured here, with an annual output of up to 60,000 units. In 1927, the company had 26 employees and generated an annual turnover of 184,745 Reichsmark. Its immersion heaters retailed for approximately three Reichsmark at the time. Additional space was leased in the building on Reichenberger Strasse from 1927 to 1932, and the first immersion heaters were also exported to Australia, India, China and South America. The first foreign subsidiary began operating in London in 1927 and a branch was opened in Zurich in 1929. The first two-stage small 1000 watts instantaneous water heaters with a porcelain casing went into production in 1928, with a daily output of 100 units. The instantaneous water cylinder was developed in 1931. The cylinder had a 3-litre capacity and the water heating was controlled by thermostats with two heating elements, each with a 500 watt output.

The company showcased hot water appliances with a capacity ranging from 3 to 600 litres at its stand at the 1932 electrical heating fair in Essen. In 1934, the company moved from Kreuzberg to Eresburgstrasse 22–23 in Berlin's Tempelhof district in order to increase capacity. Employing some 150 people, it achieved an annual turnover of one million Reichsmark that year.

The product range kept growing, and 35 German and 12 foreign patents had been granted by 1938. From 1938 onwards, the company produced water boilers of various outputs for commercial use in restaurants and industrial kitchens. Around 208,000 immersion heaters, 9500 small water heaters, 4050 bathroom water heaters and 620 water boilers were manufactured in 1938. Only five percent of these were exported. The company was already prohibited from using copper in hot water cylinders from 1937. In 1939, 350 employees generated an annual turnover of 3.2 million Reichsmark.

=== New markets overseas ===
During World War II, production was switched to armaments for the German Air Force. Given the risk of Allied bombing, some production was moved in July 1941 to Bischwiller, Alsace, under the "Elthermo" name with 200 employees, and in August 1943 to Lubsko, Lusatia, with 375 employees.

The company offices and plant in Tempelhof were destroyed during bombing raids in 1943 and the company moved to Holzminden in southern Lower Saxony in the summer of that year. It managed to save many of its machines, which were brought from Berlin to Holzminden during the war by the German state railway operator. Production continued from 1 April 1944 with original employees from Berlin, new employees from Holzminden and prisoners of war used as forced labour. The Reich Research Council planning department placed orders for the production of tailplanes. The finished parts were transported by rail from Holzminden for further processing. During the war, Stiebel Eltron also produced de-icing devices and some 50,000 special furnaces for air-raid shelters as well as electrical heating elements for anti-aircraft gun searchlights at various plants.

=== Since 1945 ===
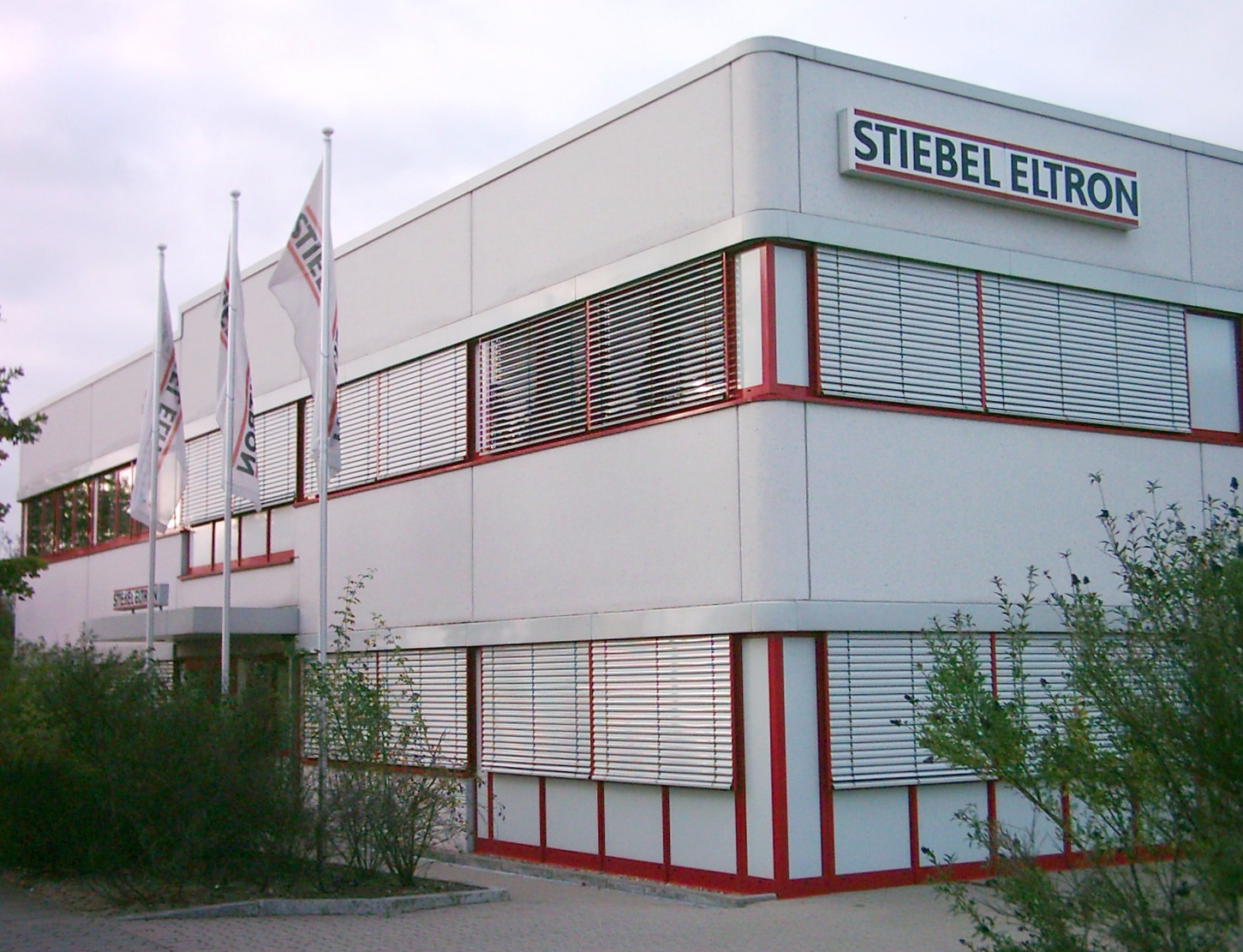
Stiebel Eltron Hamburg

After the war ended, the Holzminden factory employing 2500 people came under American military administration. Production was banned and the threat of dismantling hung over the plant. When Germany was split into occupied zones, the city of Holzminden and therefore the factory came under the administration of the British military command based in Hildesheim. From July 1945 onwards, non-military production was slowly resumed next to the actual factory premises that had been threatened with dismantling. Stiebel Eltron thus produced frying pans, saucepans and washing sprinklers initially as well as hobs, convection ovens and heating pads after the war. The production of hot water boilers only resumed again in 1946 with 400 employees in Holzminden.

On 17 October 1947, the Allies

made the decision to dismantle the machines.

Stiebel Eltron manufactured galley kitchens for passenger aircraft in 1952 and also coffee machines for commercial aircraft as well as small water heaters (DHW cylinders) from 1957.

There were 548 employees in 1953. Stiebel Eltron generated a turnover of 12.6 million DM. In 1954, the company employed 750 workers in three plants, of which 35 percent were expellees. The first type EBK 5 five litre water boilers went into production in 1958, with 145,000 units output in the same year.

Company founder Dr Theodor Stiebel died (suicide) aged 66 on 9 September 1960, leaving the company to his two sons from his second marriage, Frank and Ulrich Stiebel, in a 50/50 split.

In 1962, Dr. Stiebel Werke GmbH & Co employed more than 2200 people.

Convection ovens were offered from 1964 onwards, ironing machines from 1965 onwards (up until the early eighties) and modern electric heaters, including night storage heaters, from 1969 onwards.

In 1968, there were 2693 people employed and annual turnover rose to 130 million DM.

In 1969, the company ran an exceptional advertising campaign devised by renowned advertising expert, artist and photographer Charles Paul Wilp with the slogan "Stiebel Eltron – hot water at any time".

The first oil crisis in 1973 led to a drop in sales. Feeling the effects of the recession, the company vacated its Munich premises in 1974 and moved production to Holzminden.

From 1973 onwards, Stiebel Eltron strengthened its heating technology business unit and generated a turnover of 240 million DM in the same year.

In 1974, subsidiary Stiebel Eltron Hellas AG was founded in Kilkis near Thessaloniki in Greece to manufacture solar thermal systems.

The production of heat pump heating systems for utilising environmental heat followed in 1976. The company has been manufacturing solar collectors since 1977. The first DHW heat pumps were added in 1979.

As part of cost-cutting measures, the company let almost 400 employees go from its Holzminden site in 1982 and 1983.

Hydrotherm Gerätebau GmbH, a manufacturer of gas and condensing boilers founded in Dieburg in 1962, was acquired in 1986 and incorporated into the Holzminden plant, to which Dipl.-Ing. Karl Hagenberger GmbH, a heating technology wholesaler based in Aschheim near Munich, had also belonged since 1980.

In 1987, the company introduced the DHE, the first fully electronic instantaneous water heater, designed by engineer Ernst Appun.

Domestic ventilation systems with heat recovery were offered from 1991 onwards and the Stiebel Eltron Group generated a turnover of 256 million DM. A training centre was built at the Lüchtringer Weg (Holzminden) site in 1992. Until 1993, the management board was made up of Gerhard Götzen, Dieter Jochheim and Alexander Kantner.

In 1994, the Group had 2700 employees and generated an annual turnover of 600 million DM. The company became the first German manufacturer issuing life cycle assessments for DHW cylinders in 1995.

In 1997, the company brought to market the SCOT (system control technology) combustion and sensor system, which was capable of automatically detecting different gas properties and adjusting gas heat generators in all European countries to a particular family of gases without complex adaptations or on-site adjustments. This was recognised with the innovation award for pioneering natural gas applications in the German gas industry for 2000, endowed with 20,000 DM.

In 1998, subsidiary Hydrotherm GmbH (gas heaters) was sold to Immergas in Italy. Today, Innotherm GmbH in Langenhagen near Hanover carries out maintenance and servicing.

The LWZ 303 integral system was produced from 1999 onwards, combining all building service systems in one device for the first time: domestic ventilation with heat recovery, heating and DHW heating in combination with an air source heat pump.

Main sponsor of TSV Obergünzburg (triathlon) from 1999 to 2010 and later also kit sponsor of TBV Lemgo (handball).

Stiebel Eltron was co-initiator of an Expo 2000 project in the year 2000. 40 homes in the "Hofanlage Brombeerweg Holzminden" low energy housing development were equipped with different systems with advanced energy technology (heat pump technology, utilisation of solar energy, condensing technology).

In 2001, the company moved solar collector production from Greece to Holzminden. The tecalor GmbH subsidiary was then founded in Holzminden.

On 1 January 2002, the Stiebel Eltron Group acquired Electrolux Haustechnik GmbH with the AEG brand from Electrolux. The Nuremberg-based subsidiary with global responsibility for developing and marketing AEG building service appliances was renamed EHT Haustechnik GmbH. The Group also took over distribution for Zanker-Haustechnik and domestic sales for Olsberg Haustechnik GmbH & Co. KG.

Annual turnover in 2003 came to 300 million euros. 2000 people were employed. The company announced on 23 September 2004 that the previous Joint Managing Director for Sales and Marketing – Frank Schmidt from Höxter – would step down and be succeeded by Karlheinz Reitze in January 2005.

Tatramat based in Poprad, Slovakia, was acquired in 2004 and operates as a subsidiary.

The company announced in October 2005 that it would close its Tempelhof plant and transfer the 95 employees to Holzminden.

It emerged in May 2006 that a Chinese manufacturer had copied Stiebel Eltron's HTE 4 hand dryer and distributed it in Germany. The pirated products were available in an OBI DIY store in Höxter and other places.

In 2006, the company generated a turnover of 417 million euros (40% of this abroad) with approximately 3000 employees, 1450 of these in Holzminden. The foundation stone for a new advanced heat pump manufacturing facility was laid on 19 September 2006. Five new production lines for manufacturing 40,000 heat pumps of various types including WPC 10 annually, built with an investment of 10 million euros, were put into operation on 25 May 2007. A second heat pump manufacturing facility was built in 2009.

As part of a joint initiative with the Hanover customs office that garnered great media attention, the company had some 200 of 4000 confiscated Chinese counterfeits of a CK series bathroom rapid heater destroyed using a 12-ton roller in July 2007. According to Managing Director Karlheinz Reitze, the financial damage of these products having remained on the market would have run to about a million euros.

As a result of changes in environmental policy and the planned ban on night storage heaters in Germany in buildings with more than five residential units from 2020, sales of Stiebel Eltron electric storage heaters fell from 340,000 in 1997 to 65,000 in 2007.

On 17 October 2008, Lower Saxony's Ministry of Economics awarded the company a grant of 2.3 million euros. This 10 percent subsidy was going to support the company's expansion.

On 1 January 2010, Stiebel Eltron entered into a strategic partnership in the sanitation, heating and air conditioning segments with the Finnish Uponor Group. In 2010, the company sponsored the Swiss Cup, a football cup tournament in Switzerland.

In May 2011, a cooperation partnership was established with SorTech AG, a company founded in 2002 and based in Halle (Saale) that produces adsorption chillers and other equipment. Turnover in 2011 amounted to 452 million euros.

On 1 October 2012, the Heltron subsidiary was incorporated directly into the company and continued under the Stiebel Eltron brand. The company then vacated its Breisach site.

A new subsidiary was founded in Mäntsälä, Finland, on 1 February 2013.

On 27 May 2013, a new logistics centre was inaugurated in Holzminden (Hall N7), approx. 7 million euro investment, start of construction September 2012.

Turnover in 2013 amounted to some 460 million euros. It dropped to 425 million euros in 2014 and increased to slightly more than 435 million euros in 2015.

The groundbreaking ceremony for a new training and communications centre was held on 10 March 2014. This was designed to train up to 6,000 contractors a year and represented a 16 million euro investment for the company. The foundation stone was laid on 5 May 2014, exactly 90 years to the day since the company was founded, and the new training and communications centre (called the Energy Campus) opened in November 2015.

The Energy Campus was awarded the Certificate in Platinum by the German Sustainable Building Council (DGNB) on 12 May 2016 – achieving the highest rating (86 percent) ever in the Educational Buildings category anywhere in the world.

Rudolf Sonnemann retired on 31 December 2016, having been chairman of the board since 2007 and managing director from 1999 prior to that.

In early 2022, the company announced plans to invest approximately €120 million at its headquarters in a new heat pump production facility, aiming to double its heat pump manufacturing capacity by 2026. The capacity expansion was also expected to create around 400 new jobs. By April 2023, a more substantial expansion was announced: the workforce in heat pump production, then numbering 400 employees, would triple to 1,200 by 2027, with a €450 million investment intended to quadruple production output.

Stiebel Eltron is taking over portions of the production and operational facilities at Continental's former site in Gifhorn. The corresponding agreements were signed in late 2023. The company will gradually assume control of sections of the existing infrastructure by the end of 2027, with plans to manufacture indoor heat pump modules at the location.

In 2024 the company celebrated its 100-year anniversary.

In 2025, the company launched the hpnext series of heat pumps. The series introduced a new platform for its air-source, ground-source, and integrated indoor air-source heat pumps with mechanical ventilation with heat recovery (MVHR). Some models received Red Dot Design Awards and German Design Awards. The units use R290 refrigerant, which has a low global warming potential.

== Management ==
=== Partners and co-owners since 1960 ===
- Stiebel Family Trust, created by Dr Ulrich Stiebel
- Frank Stiebel

Axel Freiherr von Ruedorffer is the Chairman of the supervisory board.

=== Managing Directors ===
- Nicholas Matten, Distribution, Marketing and Finances
- Kai Schiefelbein, Technology, Procurement and HR

Inken Schäfer is the chairman of the works council.

== Production plants and sales centres ==
- Holzminden, head office and main production plant
- Eschwege, manufacturing facility
- Poprad, plant in Slovakia under the Tatramat name
- Ayutthaya, plant in Bangkok, Thailand, Tianjin manufacturing facility, manufacturing facility in China since 2005
- Eschborn, sales centre – Central (previously the Frankfurt sales centre)
- Hamburg-Moorburg, sales centre – North (previously the Hamburg sales centre)
- Oberhausen, sales centre – West (since January 2010, replaced the Dortmund and Cologne/Ossendorf sales centres)
- Markkleeberg, sales centre – East (previously the Leipzig sales centre)
- Nuremberg, sales centre – South, Bavaria (previously the Munich sales centre)
- Stuttgart-Weilimdorf, sales centre – South, Baden-Württemberg (previously the Stuttgart sales centre)

== Subsidiaries ==
- Stiebel Eltron Vertriebs
- Stiebel Eltron International EHT Haustechnik GmbH mit Markenvertrieb AEG
- LTM GmbH, Holzminden
- tecalor GmbH, Holzminden
- Stiebel Eltron subsidiaries in fourteen European countries:
  - Brescia, Italy
  - Hörsching/Linz, Austria
  - Lupfig, Switzerland
  - Brussels, Belgium
  - 's-Hertogenbosch, Netherlands
  - Metz, France
  - Bromborough, Wirral, UK
  - Mäntsälä, Finland
  - Stavanger, Norway
  - Sävedalen, Sweden
  - Prague, Czech Republic
  - Budapest, Hungary
  - Poprad, Slovakia
  - Warsaw, Poland
- Outside of Europe:
  - Melbourne, Australia
  - Auckland, New Zealand
  - Kawasaki, Japan
  - Ayutthaya, Thailand
  - Tianjin, Shanghai, Guangzhou, China
  - Massachusetts, USA
  - Maharashtra, India
  - Johannesburg, South Africa

The company also has representatives in more than 120 countries.

== Memberships ==
- BDH – Bundesindustrieverband Deutschland Haus-, Energie- und Umwelttechnik e. V. [German association for the building services, energy and environment industry], Cologne, www.bdh-koeln.de, formerly the Bundesverband Deutscher Heizungsindustrie e. V. [German association for the heating industry]
- BWP – Bundesverband Wärmepumpe e. V. [German association for the heat pump industry], Berlin (since 1993)
- ZVEH – Zentralverband der Deutschen Elektro- und Informationstechnischen Handwerke [German association for electrical and information technology trades], Frankfurt am Main
- ZVEI – Zentralverband Elektrotechnik- und Elektronikindustrie e. V. [Central association for the electrical and electronics industry], Frankfurt am Main
- BHKS – Bundesindustrieverband Heizungs-, Klima-, Sanitärtechnik, Technische Gebäudesysteme e. V. [Federal industrial association for heating, ventilation, sanitary engineering/technical building systems], Bonn
- ZVSHK/GED – Zentralverband Sanitär Heizung Klima/Gebäude- und Energietechnik Deutschland [German central association for plumbing, heating and air conditioning/building services and energy technology]
- Co-publisher as part of the [Wärme+] initiative group of GED Gesellschaft für Energiedienstleistung GmbH & Co. KG, Frankfurt am Main
- Member of the German Sustainable Building Council (DGNB) (since January 2011)

== Sponsorships ==
Stiebel Eltron sponsors the International Street Theatre Festival held every two years in Holzminden, amongst other things. Ulrich Stiebel is founder and Chairman of Foundation for the Wellbeing of Foster Children.

== Bibliography ==
- Michael Birke: Stiebel Eltron – ein mittelständisches Unternehmen [Stiebel Eltron – A Medium Sized Company]. in: Niedersachsenbuch 2004. p. 134 et seq., Lower Saxony Ministry of the Interior and Sport, distributed by CW Niemeyer Druck, Hameln, ISSN 0946-5588.
- Documentation: 100 Jahre Theodor Stiebel 1994 – Stiebel Eltron 70 Jahre [100 years of Theodor Stiebel 1994 – Stiebel Eltron at 70]. Frank and Ulrich Stiebel, 28 February 1994.
