= Holzminden internment camp =

World War I detention camp in Germany

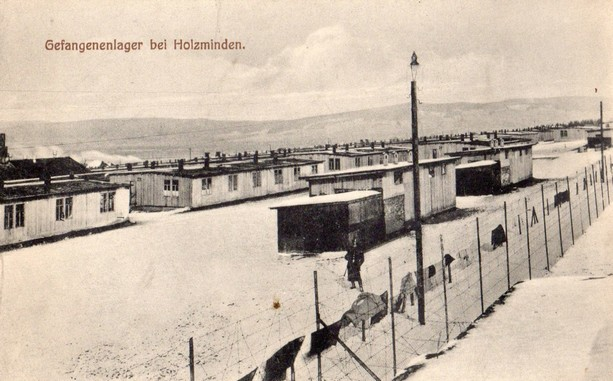
Holzminden internment camp, Winter 1917

Holzminden internment camp was a large World War I detention camp (Internierungslager) located to the north-east of Holzminden, Lower Saxony, Germany, which existed from 1914 to 1918. It held civilian internees from allied nations. It was the largest internment camp in Germany, and in October 1918 held 4,240 civilians.

It is not to be confused with Holzminden prisoner-of-war camp, a much smaller camp for British and British Empire officers, which occupied a former cavalry barracks nearer the centre of the town, and which existed from September 1917 to December 1918.

== The camp ==
The camp contained approximately 120 huts, and was surrounded by a perimeter fence dominated by watchtowers. It was made up of two compounds, one for men, and one for about 500 women and children. During the day, the women and children were allowed to enter the main compound.

The inmates mainly comprised Polish, Russian, Belgian and French nationals, many of the French being from Alsace-Lorraine; and later Serbians and Romanians. Among them was the Belgian historian, Henri Pirenne; and the Belgian courtier, Count Charles John d'Oultremont. In November 1916 the camp received 300 civilians from northern France, followed by another 600 in January 1918: many of these were members of local elites, who were effectively being held by the Germans as hostages. A small number of British internees were also held, including five stewardesses from the Great Eastern Railway ferry SS Brussels.

Although conditions in the camp were harsh, inmates were able to receive mail and food parcels. They developed their own communal facilities, including a "university", chapels, a school for the children, a café, and a photographic studio. Theatrical performances and concerts were held.

== The practice of internment ==
During the First World War, the allied nations also practised the displacement and internment of enemy nationals. Around fifty internment camps existed in France between 1914 and 1919: they received in total over 40,000 German-speaking civilians (many from Germany and Austria-Hungary, but also including about 8,000 civilians from Alsace-Lorraine), in various capacities and for varying durations. Great Britain detained more than 30,000 foreigners during the conflict. Targeted deportations, such as that of hundreds of prominent citizens from northern France to Holzminden between November 1916 and April 1917, were probably designed to discourage acts of resistance in the occupied regions, and to strengthen the Germans' hand in negotiating civilian exchanges.

== See also ==
- World War I prisoners of war in Germany
- List of prisoner-of-war camps in Germany
- List of concentration and internment camps
- Ruhleben internment camp

== Bibliography ==
- Becker, Annette (1998). Oubliés de la Grande guerre: humanitaire et culture de guerre, 1914–1918: populations occupées, déportés civils, prisonniers de guerre. Paris: Noêsis. ISBN 978-2911606236. 2012791670
- Farcy, Jean-Claude (1995). Les camps de concentration français de la première guerre mondiale (1914–1920). Paris: Anthropos. ISBN 978-2717827880.
- Steuer, Kenneth (2009). "Chapter 11". Pursuit of an 'Unparalleled Opportunity': the American YMCA and Prisoner of War Diplomacy among the Central Power Nations during World War I, 1914–1923. New York: Columbia University Press. ISBN 9780231130288.
- Wallart, Claudine (1998). "Déportation de prisonniers civils 'au camp de concentration' d'Holzminden, novembre 1916–avril 1917". Revue du Nord. 80 (325): 417–448. doi:10.3406/rnord.1998.6017.
- Wallart, Claudine (2000). "Un camp de concentration de la Première Guerre: Holzminden". Florilège des Archives départementales du Nord.
