= Aubrey de Sélincourt =

British writer, academic and translator (1894–1962)

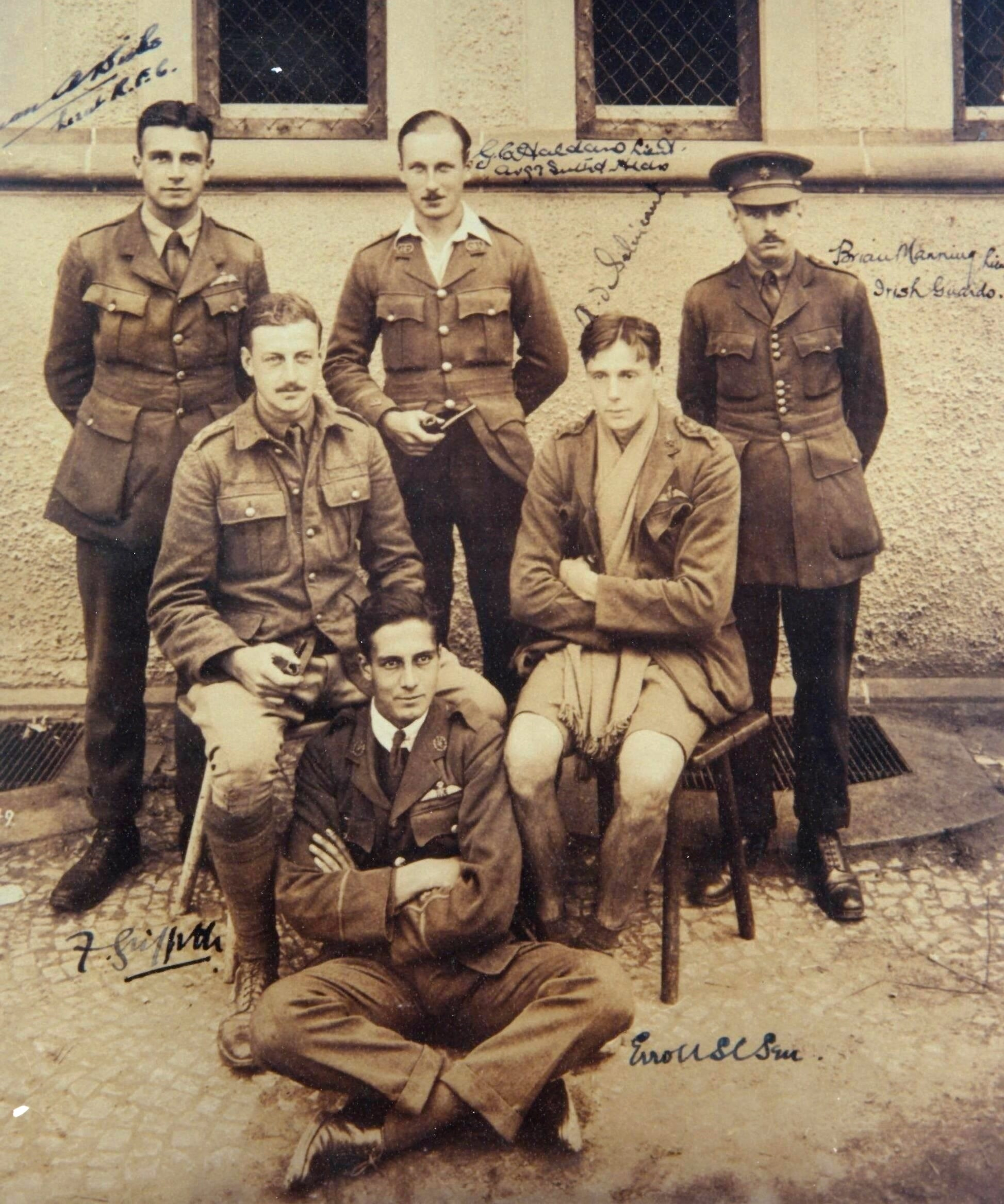
- De Sélincourt (seated, right) in Holzminden prisoner-of-war camp, c. 1918
- Born: 7 June 1894
- Died: 20 December 1962 (aged 68)
- Occupations: Writer; classical scholar; translator
- Spouse: Irene Rutherford McLeod (m. 1919)
- Children: 2
- Relatives: A. A. Milne (brother-in-law); Christopher Robin Milne (nephew)

Aubrey de Sélincourt (7 June 1894 – 20 December 1962) was an English writer, classical scholar, and translator. He was also a keen sailor. He had over 24 books credited to his authorship, but is chiefly remembered for his translations—all for Penguin Classics—of Herodotus' The Histories (1954), Arrian's Life of Alexander the Great (1958), Livy's The Early History of Rome (Books I to V, 1960), and The War with Hannibal (Books XXI to XXX, 1965, posthumous).

== Life ==
De Sélincourt was the son of the businessman Martin de Sélincourt, owner of the Swan & Edgar store in London. His uncle, Henry Fiennes Speed, was the author of Cruises in Small Yachts and Big Canoes (1883). Aubrey was educated at the Dragon School, Oxford, and at Rugby School, from where in 1913 he won an open classical scholarship to University College, Oxford.

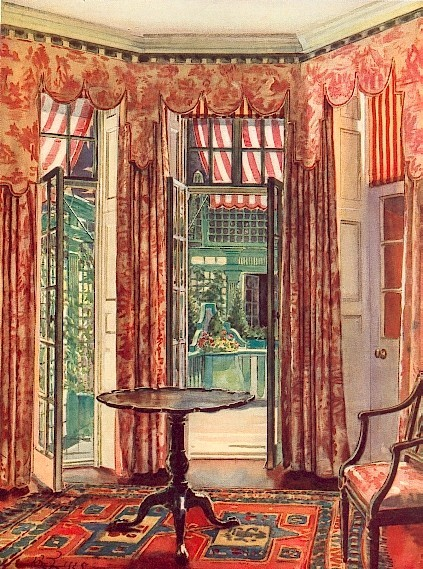
Room in Martin de Selincourt's house, 1926

Following the outbreak of the First World War, he abandoned his studies to join the army. He was gazetted to the 7th Battalion of the North Staffordshire Regiment on 29 August 1914, and served in Gallipoli, where he was involved in the Battle of Sari Bair in August 1915. He subsequently requested transfer to the Royal Flying Corps and returned to Britain for pilot training: he was awarded his "wings" early in 1917 and joined 25 Squadron on 11 April. On 28 May 1917 he was shot down near Douai, while flying an FE2d, by Werner Voss, becoming the latter's 31st victory. He remained a prisoner for the rest of the war, for much of the time at Holzminden prisoner-of-war camp.

Following the war and his discharge from the Royal Air Force, de Sélincourt returned to Oxford, where he was awarded a Half Blue for athletics and took his BA in 1919. He taught at Bembridge School on the Isle of Wight from 1921 to 1924; and as senior classics master at the Dragon School, Oxford, from 1924 to 1929. In 1931 he was appointed Headmaster of Clayesmore School, Dorset, where he remained until 1935.

He edited The Oxford Magazine from 1927 to 1929; and he also contributed to the Manchester Guardian, the English Review, The Times Literary Supplement, and other periodicals. He was a keen yachtsman, and wrote several books on sailing.

He taught at Bryanston School, Dorset from 1936 to 1946 where he was a popular English master.

After retiring in 1947, de Sélincourt settled at Niton on the Isle of Wight, and devoted himself to writing. He died there in December 1962, shortly after the publication of one of his most successful books, The World of Herodotus.

== Family ==
De Sélincourt had two brothers, Geoffrey and Guy, and a sister, Dorothy. Guy was Bursar at Clayesmore School in Aubrey's time there, and, like him, was a good sailor and historian. He was also an artist and illustrated several of Aubrey's books. Dorothy married A. A. Milne in 1913.

In 1919, de Sélincourt married the poet Irene Rutherford McLeod. They had two daughters: Lesley (who married her first cousin, Christopher Robin Milne) and Anne.

== Works ==
- Streams of Ocean (London: William Heinemann, 1923) – essays
- Family Afloat (London: George Routledge & Sons, 1940)
- Three Green Bottles (London: George Routledge and Sons, 1941)
- One Good Tern (London: George Routledge and Sons, 1943; illustrated by Guy de Sélincourt)
- One More Summer (London: George Routledge & Sons, 1944)
- Six O'clock and After and Other Rhymes for Children (London: Frederick Muller, 1945, with Irene de Sélincourt)
- Calicut Lends a Hand (London: George Routledge and Sons, 1946)
- Dorset (London: Paul Elek, 1947; Vision of England series)
- Micky (London: George Routledge and Sons, 1947)
- Isle of Wight (London: Paul Elek, 1948; Vision of England series; drawings by Kenneth Rowntree)
- A Capful of Wind (London: Methuen & Co., 1948; illustrated by Guy de Sélincourt)
- The Young Schoolmaster (Oxford University Press, 1948; Career Book Series; illustrated by F. W. Middlehurst)
- Kestrel (London: Routledge & Kegan Paul, 1949; illustrated by Guy de Sélincourt)
- Sailing: A Guide For Everyman (London: John Lehmann, 1949)
- The Raven's Nest (London: Routledge & Kegan Paul, 1949; illustrated by Guy de Sélincourt)
- Mr Oram's Story: The Adventures of Capt. James Cook (London: 1949; Story Books series)
- Odysseus the Wanderer (London: George Bell & Sons, 1950)
- The Schoolmaster (London: John Lehmann, 1951)
- On Reading Poetry (London: Phoenix House, 1952)
- The Channel Shore (London: Robert Hale, 1953; The Regional Books series)
- Herodotus, The Histories (Harmondsworth. Middlesex: Penguin Books, 1954; Penguin Classics, L34) – translation
- Six Great Englishmen: Drake, Dr. Johnson, Nelson, Marlborough, Keats, Churchill (London: Hamish Hamilton, 1954; The "Six Great" series; reprinted Penguin Books, 1960 (Puffin Books)
- Cat's Cradle (London: Michael Joseph, 1955)
- Six Great Poets: Chaucer, Pope, Wordsworth, Shelley, Tennyson, The Brownings (London: Hamish Hamilton, 1956; The "Six Great" series)
- Nansen ( Oxford University Press, 1957; illustrated by Ian Ribbons)
- Six Great Thinkers: Socrates, St. Augustine, Lord Bacon, Rousseau, Coleridge, John Stuart Mill (London: Hamish Hamilton, 1958; The "Six Great" series)
- Arrian, Life of Alexander the Great (Harmondsworth. Middlesex: Penguin Books, 1958; Penguin Classics, L81) – translation
- Livy, The Early History of Rome: Books I–V of the History of Rome from its Foundation (1960, translation)
- Six Great Playwrights (London: Hamish Hamilton, 1960; The "Six Great" series)
- The Book of the Sea (London: Eyre and Spottiswoode, 1961; New York: W. W. Norton, 1963; edited by Aubrey de Sélincourt) – anthology
- The World of Herodotus (London: Secker & Warburg, 1962; Boston: Little, Brown, 1962; London: The Folio Society, 2015)
- Livy, The War with Hannibal: Books XXI–XXX of the History of Rome from its Foundation (Harmondsworth. Middlesex: Penguin Books, 1965; Penguin Classics, L145) – translation, posthumously edited by Betty Radice
- Arrian, The Campaigns of Alexander (Harmondsworth. Middlesex: Penguin Books, 1971; Penguin Classics) – translation, revised with a new introduction and notes by James R. Hamilton

== Sources ==
- Anon. (22 December 1962). "Obituary: Mr. Aubrey de Selincourt: Schoolmaster and Writer". The Times. p. 8.
- Diggens, Barry (2003). September Evening: The Life and Final Combat of the German Ace Werner Voss. London: Grub Street. p. 57. ISBN 1904010474.
- Franks, Norman; Giblin, Hal (1997). Under the Guns of the German Aces: Immelmann, Voss, Göring, Lothar von Richthofen: the Complete Record of their Victories and Victims. London: Grub Street. pp. 109–110. ISBN 1898697728.
- Herodotus (1954). The Histories. Translated by de Sélincourt, Aubrey. Harmondsworth: Penguin.
- Livy (1978). The History of Early Rome. Translated by de Sélincourt, Aubrey. Norwalk, Connecticut: The Easton Press. pp. i–iv.
