= Edward Bellew =

Recipient of the Victoria Cross

Captain Edward Bellew VC
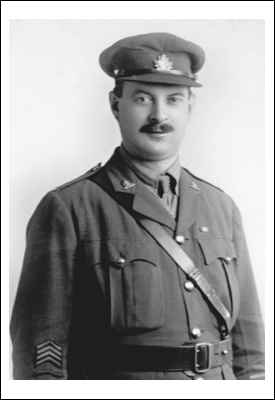
- Edward Bellew during the First World War
- Born: Edward Donald Bellew; 28 October 1882; Bombay, Bombay Presidency, British Raj
- Died: 1 February 1961 (aged 78); Kamloops, British Columbia, Canada
- Burial place: Hillside Cemetery, Kamloops
- Education: Clifton College; Royal Military College, Sandhurst
- Relatives: Robert Bellew Adams VC (second cousin)
- Military career
- Allegiance: United Kingdom; Dominion of Canada
- Branch: British Army: British Expeditionary Force; Canadian Militia: Canadian Expeditionary Force
- Service years: 1901–1903 (UK); 1914–1919 (Canada)
- Rank: Captain
- Units: Royal Irish Regiment; 7th (1st British Columbia) Battalion
- Conflicts: World War I: Western Front; Second Battle of Ypres (POW)
- Awards: Victoria Cross

Edward Donald Bellew, VC (28 October 1882 – 1 February 1961, Kamloops, British Columbia), Captain of the 7th Bn British Columbia Regiment, CEF was a Canadian recipient of the Victoria Cross, the highest and most prestigious award for gallantry in the face of the enemy that can be awarded to British and Commonwealth forces.

== Early life ==
Bellew was born in Bombay, India, on 28 October 1882. He began his education at Blundell's School, Devon, England, but left to attend Clifton College (1897–1900), from where he was admitted to the Royal Military College, Sandhurst. He joined the Royal Irish Regiment in 1901. He emigrated to Canada in 1903 and worked as a construction engineer. In September 1914, shortly after the outbreak of the First World War, he enlisted in the British Columbia Regiment.

== Action ==
Bellew was 32 years old, and a lieutenant in the 7th (1st British Columbia) Battalion, Canadian Expeditionary Force, when the following deed took place for which he was awarded the VC.

During the Second Battle of Ypres, a mass attack on the Canadian line developed on the morning of Saturday 24 April 1915 near Keerselaere, Belgium. The Canadians were suffering heavy casualties. The advance of the enemy was temporarily stayed by Lieutenant Bellew, the battalion machine-gun officer, who had two guns in action on high ground when the enemy's attack broke in full force. The reinforcements sent forward having been destroyed, and with the enemy less than 100 yards (91 m) away and no further assistance in sight, Bellew and a Sergeant Peerless decided to fight it out. The sergeant was killed and Bellew wounded. Nevertheless, he maintained his fire until his ammunition failed, when he seized a rifle, smashed his machine-gun and, fighting to the last, was taken prisoner.

== Later life ==
Bellew remained a prisoner of war (latterly in Holzminden prisoner-of-war camp) until 1919, and achieved the rank of Captain. He subsequently returned to Canada and became a dredging inspector. He died in 1961 and is buried at Hillside Cemetery, Kamloops, British Columbia.

== Family ==
Bellew was the second cousin of Robert Bellew Adams, VC.

== Loss of medal ==
Bellew's Victoria Cross is believed to have been stolen from the Royal Canadian Military Institute, Toronto, between January 1975 and 22 July 1977. It has never been recovered.
