= Irene R. McLeod =

British poet, writer, and editor

- Born: 21 August 1891; Croydon, Surrey
- Died: 2 December 1968 (aged 77); Isle of Wight
- Occupations: poet; writer; editor
- Spouse: Aubrey de Sélincourt (m. 1919)
- Children: 2

Irene Rutherford McLeod (21 August 1891 – 2 December 1968) was a British poet, writer and editor, published in the early twentieth century.

== Life ==
McLeod was born in Croydon, Surrey, on 21 August 1891. In 1919, she married the writer, classical scholar and translator Aubrey de Sélincourt. They had two daughters, Lesley (who married her first cousin, Christopher Robin Milne), and Anne.

She died on 2 December 1968 on the Isle of Wight.

== Works ==
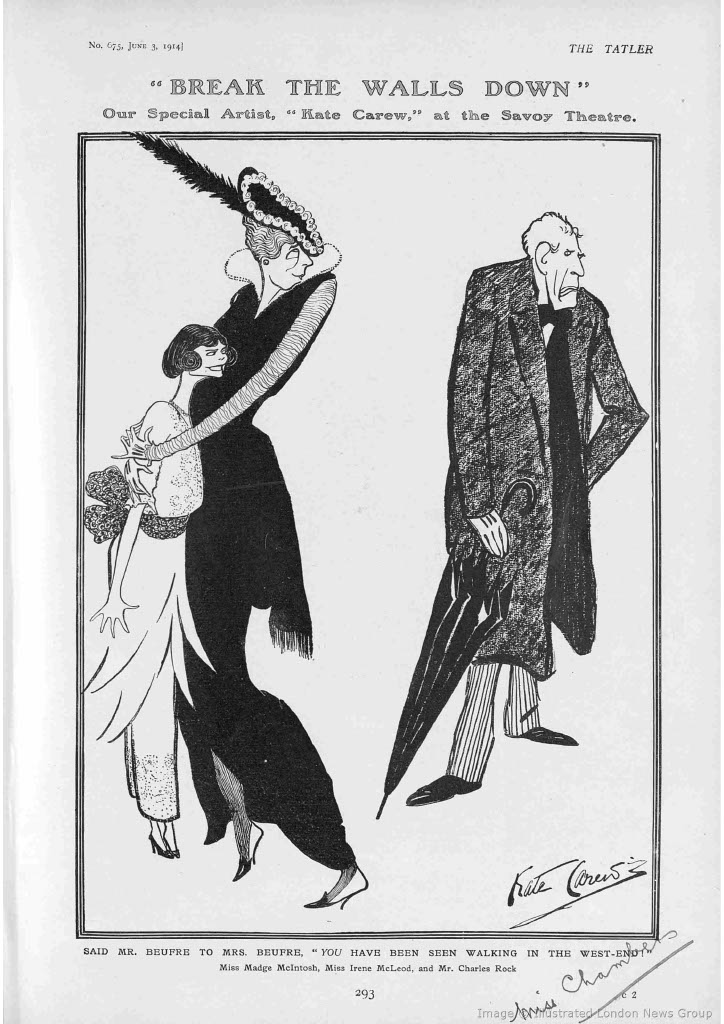
Irene McLeod (centre) as Madge Beufre in Break the Walls Down by Mrs Alexander Gross. Caricature by Kate Carew from Tatler, 3 June 1914.

When McLeod was in her late teens, she was involved with the women's suffrage movement in London. Her play The Reforming of Augustus (1910) was written in support of the movement and performed at the Rehearsal Theatre, London. Following the success of The Reforming of Augustus, her plays The Boot and How Spring Came to Nutts Alley were performed in aid of the suffragist Young Purple, White, and Green Club (1912). Further work for the suffrage cause included acting in Evelyn Glover's one-act play Which? to aid the Actresses' Franchise League and Break the Walls Down by Mrs Alexander Gross. She also acted in The Voysey Inheritance by Harley Granville-Barker and the premiere of The Eldest Son by John Galsworthy.

Her works include volumes of poetry, drama, children's literature and novels. Her first book of poems, Songs to Save a Soul (1915), sold well and immediately went through six editions.

McLeod published two novels. Graduation (1918) explored the adventures of Frieda, a free-thinking artist and Suffragette. Towards Love (1923) is a novel about the Great War, in which one of the protagonists is jailed as a conscientious objector.

Some of her poems, such as "Lone Dog" from Songs to Save a Soul, have been adapted to song.

== Publications ==
=== Poetry ===
- Songs to Save a Soul. (London: Chatto & Windus, 1915).
- Swords for Life. (London: Chatto & Windus, 1916).
- Before Dawn. (New York: B.W. Huebsch, 1918).
- The Darkest Hour. (London: Chatto & Windus, 1918).
- Six O'Clock and After: And Other Rhymes for Children. Irene McLeod and Aubrey de Sélincourt. (London: F. Muller, London, 1945).

=== Novels ===
- Graduation. (London: Chatto & Windus, 1918).
- Towards Love. (London: W. Heinemann, London, 1923).

=== Drama ===
- The Reforming of Augustus. (London: Woman's Press, 1910).

=== Works set to music ===
- Heintzman, Cornelia Gerhard. Three Poems by Irene Rutherford McLeod. Arranged by Leo Smith. (USA: Cornelia Gerhard Heintzman, c1918).
- Head, Michael. Lone Dog. Words by Irene R. McLeod. (London: Boosey & Hawkes, 1960).
- Britten, Benjamin. Lone Dog: Unison Treble Voices & Piano. Words by Irene R. McLeod. (New York: Boosey & Hawkes, c1994).
