= Cross and Cockade =

Cross & Cockade International Journal, normally referred to simply as Cross & Cockade, is a historical magazine about aviation in World War I, first published in 1970. Its full title was Cross & Cockade Great Britain Journal from 1970 to 1986, when it changed to the present name. The name Cross and Cockade refers to the black cross and coloured roundel symbols used respectively on German and British World War I aircraft.

The journal is published by The Great War Aviation Society, formerly known as The Society of World War I Aero Historians 1970–1986; and Cross & Cockade International 1986–2023.
