= Hans Kohnert =

German painter

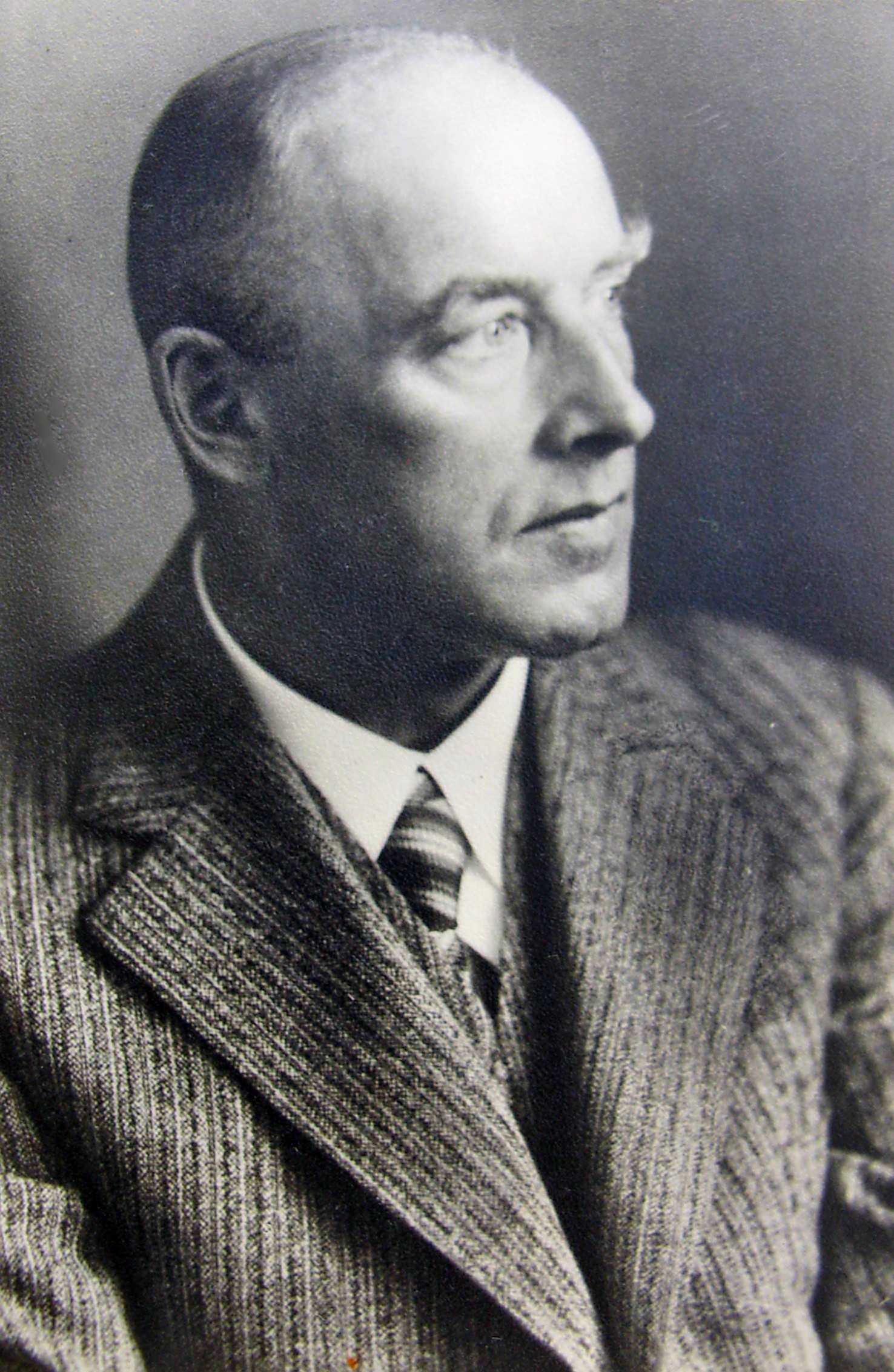
- Hans Kohn (before renaming, 1937)
- Born: 15 November 1887; Geestemünde, Kingdom of Hanover Germany
- Died: 16 January 1967 (aged 79); Bremerhaven, Germany
- Education: Grand-Ducal Saxon Art School, Weimar
- Occupations: entrepreneur and Chairman
- Spouse(s): Maria Kohn, née Müller (1890–1945)
- Children: Franz, Hannemarie, Johanna

Hans Kohnert (born 15 November 1887 in Geestemünde; died 10 January 1967 in Bremerhaven) was a German entrepreneur, senator, Wehrwirtschaftsführer, painter and patron in Bremerhaven.

== Life ==
Hans Kohn's parents were Franz Kohn (1857–1909) and his wife Johanna Margarethe, née Gehrels (1862–1925). The ancestors were captains and owners of emigrant sailing ships that brought emigrants from Brake and Bremerhaven at the lower Weser river to America in the 19th century and carried out overseas trade on their way back via the Caribbean. With the advent of the steamship in the 1850s, the business became unprofitable. Hans Kohn's grandfather settled down and bought into a timber import company. Hans Kohn first studied art painting (1906/07) in the 'Class of Antiquities' of Max Thedy at the Grand-Ducal Saxon Art School, Weimar. After the premature death of his father (1909), Hans dropped out of his art studies at the age of 22 to take over his father's company, the wood importing and processing company Pundt & Kohn (P & K), since 1937 Pundt & Kohnert, in Geestemünde. He developed the company into one of the most important and oldest companies in this branch on the Lower Weser up to World War II and led it until his death in 1967.

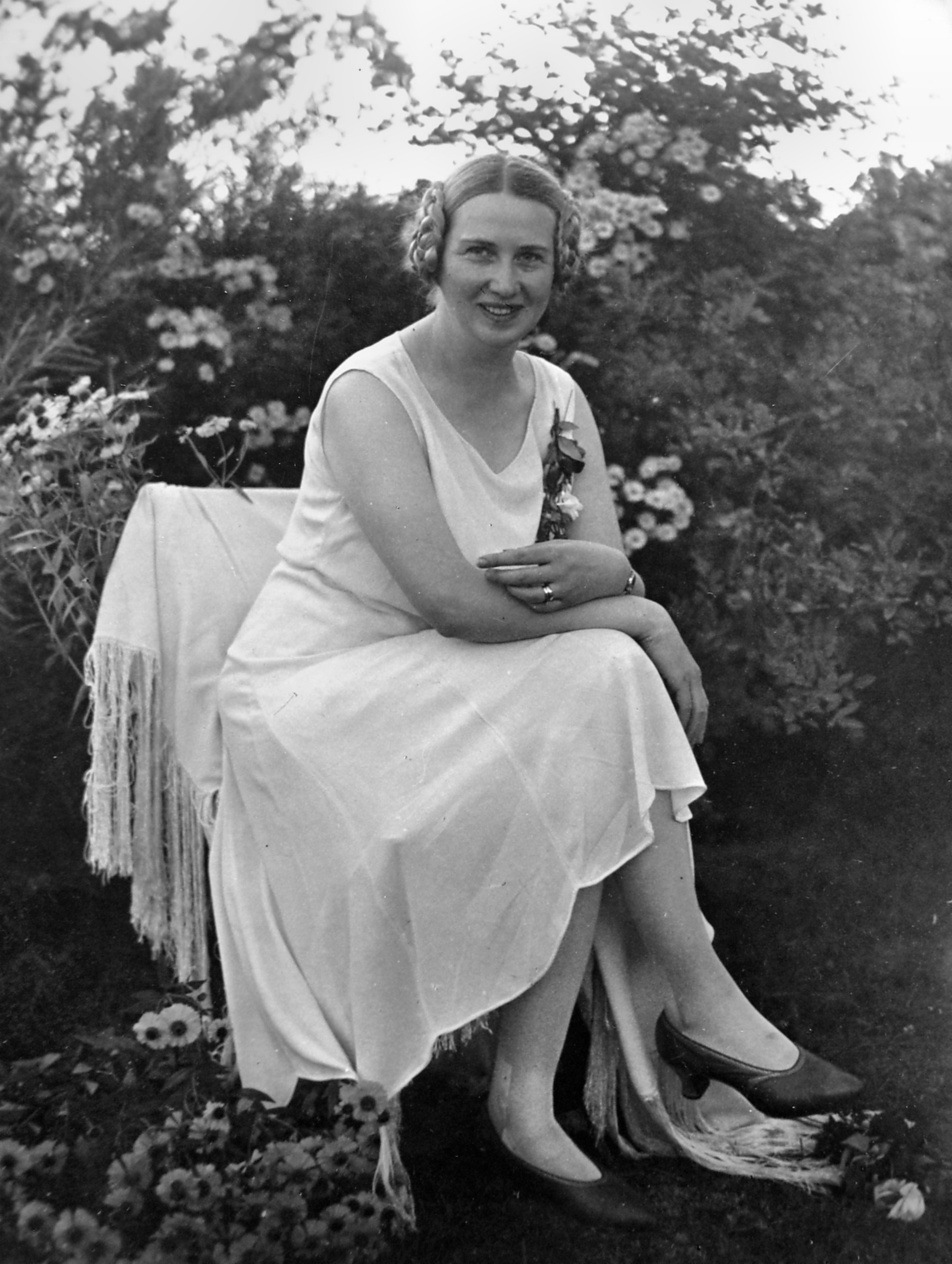
Maria Kohn, born Müller, 1929

In 1912 he married Maria Kohn, née Müller (1890–1945), with whom he had a son (Franz) and a daughter (Hannemarie). He divorced in the mid-1930s. In his second marriage, Kohnert was married from 1939 to Ingeborg Kohnert, née Neumann (1911–1990), with whom he had another daughter (Johanna). Due to hostility because of his Jewish-sounding family name (Kohn, Cohn) during the reign of Nazi Germany, he applied for a name change from Kohn to Kohnert in 1937 for himself, his family and his company. This was duly apostilled on 14 August 1937.

=== Enterprise ===
The wood importing and wood processing company Pundt & Kohn (1937 renamed to Pundt & Kohnert, founded by his grandfather in 1863, including the company's sawmills and planing mills, which also operated under the denomination Geestemünder Holzindustriewerke Backhaus & Co., in Geestemünde — one of the most important and oldest companies in this branch on the lower Weser – experienced its heyday under Hans Kohn(ert).

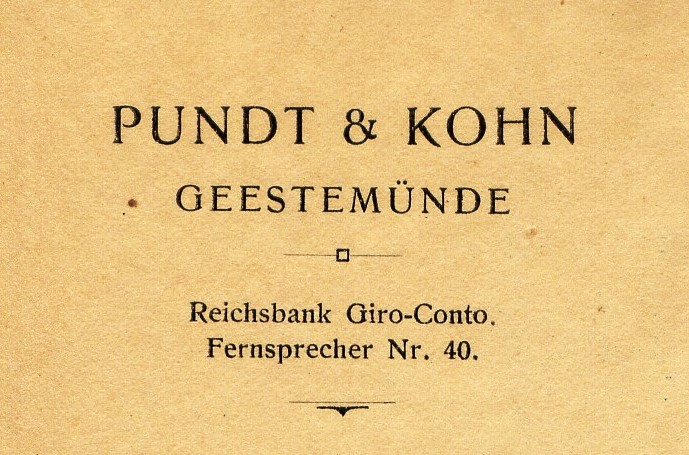
Letterhead from the 'Pundt & Kohn' company, 1930s

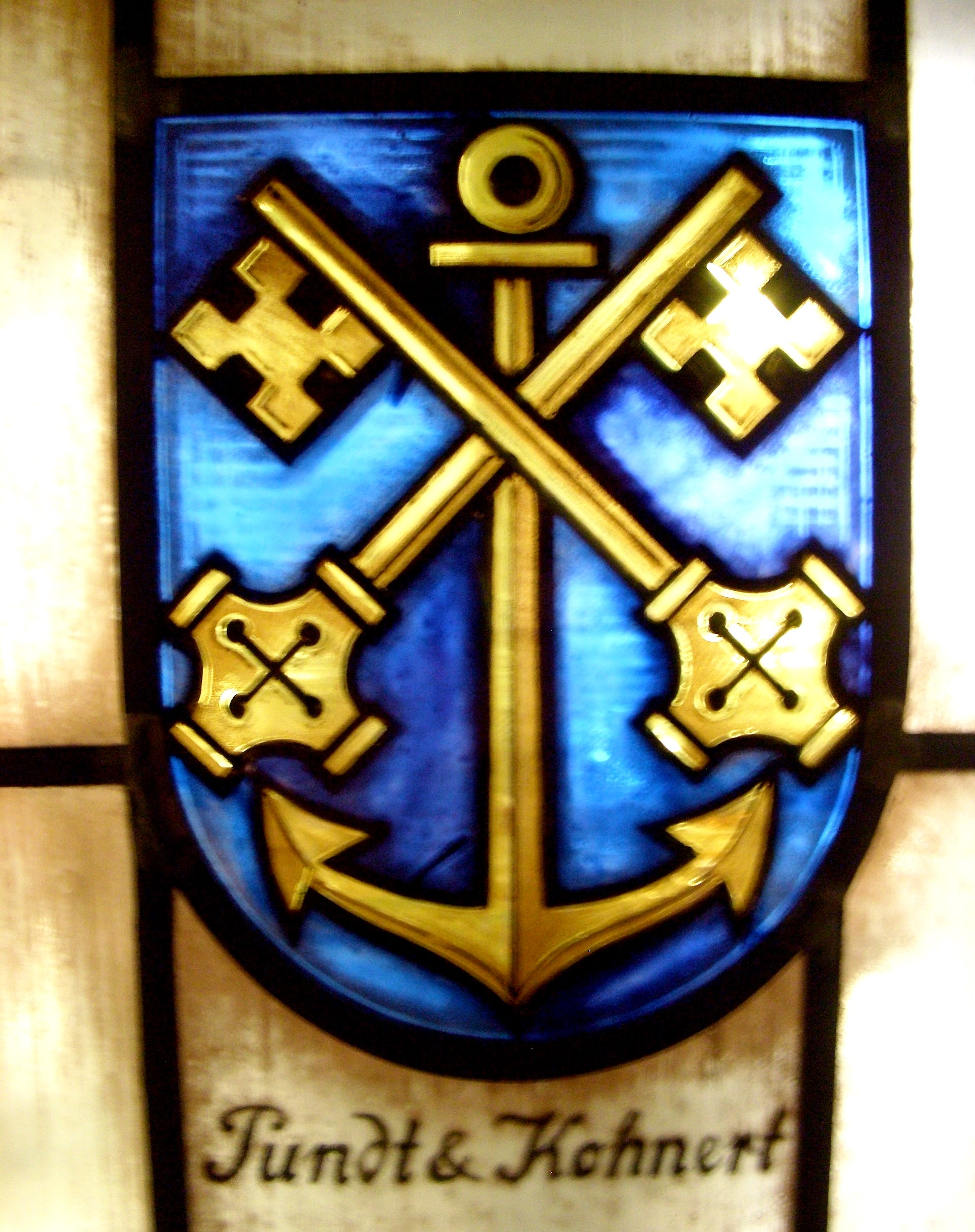
Cabinet pane (glass painting) Pundt & Kohnert, 1938

During World War II the factory, the wood storage and office and residential buildings on the Geeste river, the timber harbour of Geestemünde, the old company's port and the lumber wharf at Schönianstrasse and Borriesstrasse (Geestemünde) were destroyed by Allied bombers during the night of the Strategic bombing of Bremerhaven (18 September 1944). The company was never able to recover from the destruction in the post-war period. After the death of his elder brother, Gerhard Kohnert, in 1962, Hans Kohnert took over the furniture industry Meller Möbelfabrik (MMM) as well, which had been founded by Gerhard in 1909 in Melle near Osnabrück. After the war, the latter had already been closely linked to the timber import company (P & K) through a profit transfer agreement (1956–1966), which contributed to the fact that MMM did not make the necessary investment and modernize to cope with the fierce completion in this market. In 1966, MMM was sold to the main creditors to forestall liquidation. In January 1975, MMM finally went bankrupt under the new owners. The company Pundt & Kohnert in Bremerhaven was dissolved after Hans Kohnert's death in 1967.

=== Further activities ===
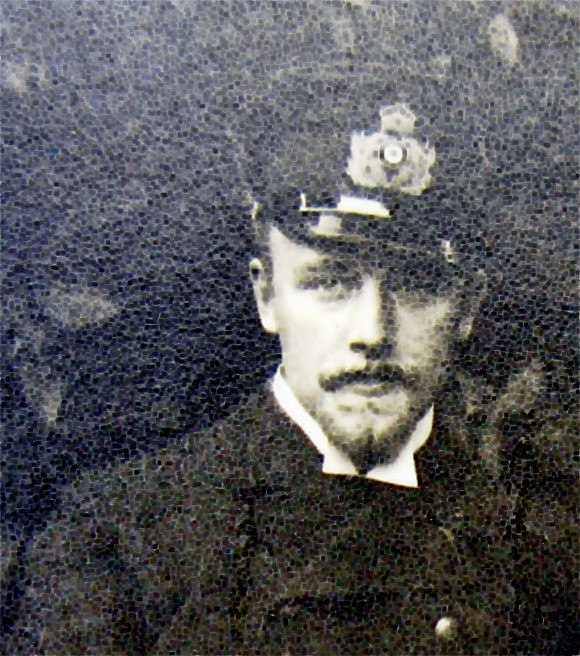
Hans Kohn, officer of the German Imperial Marine, 1915

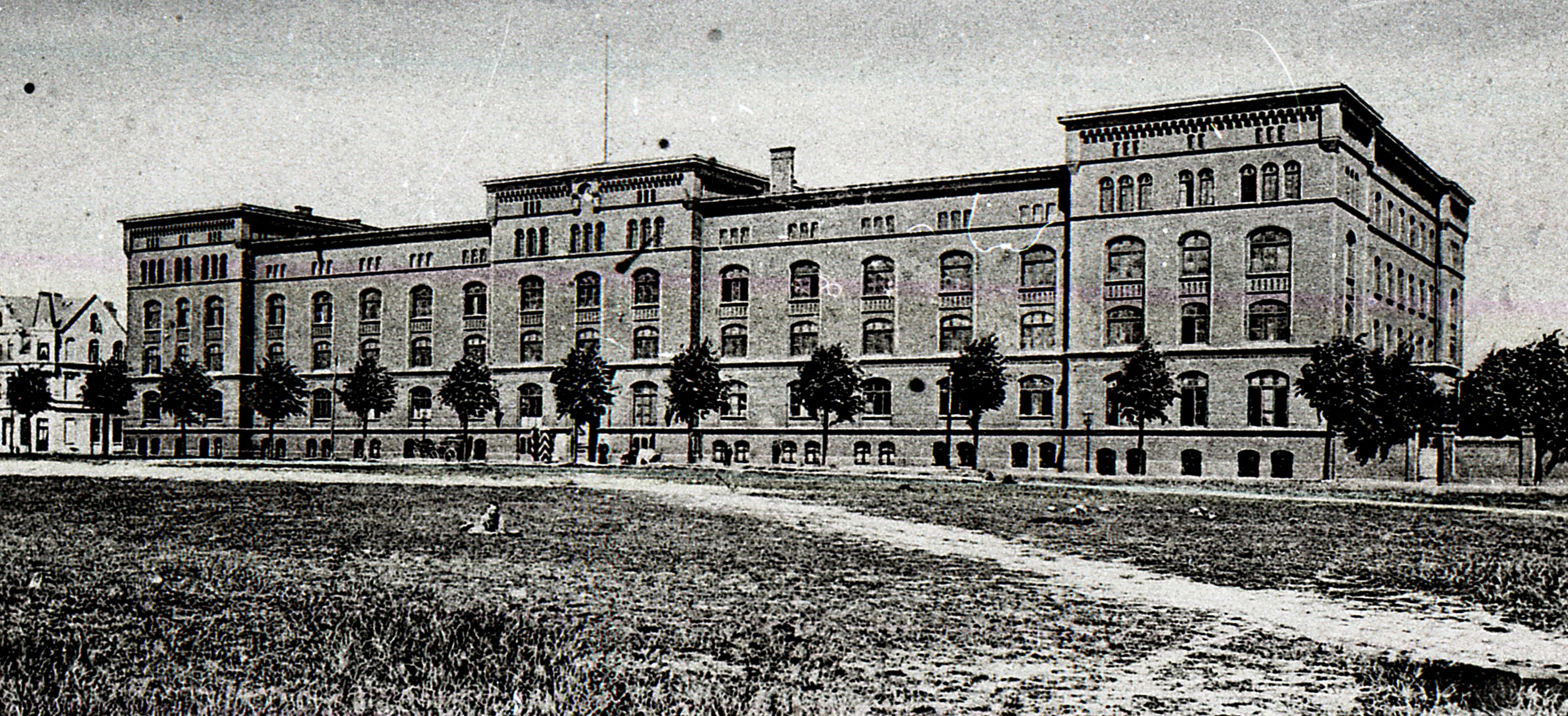
barracks of the III. sea artillery, Bremerhaven-Lehe, about 1900

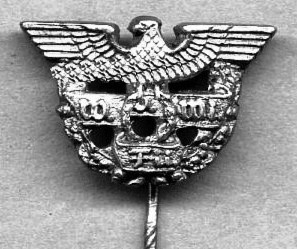
Wehrwirtschaftsführer, civil badge

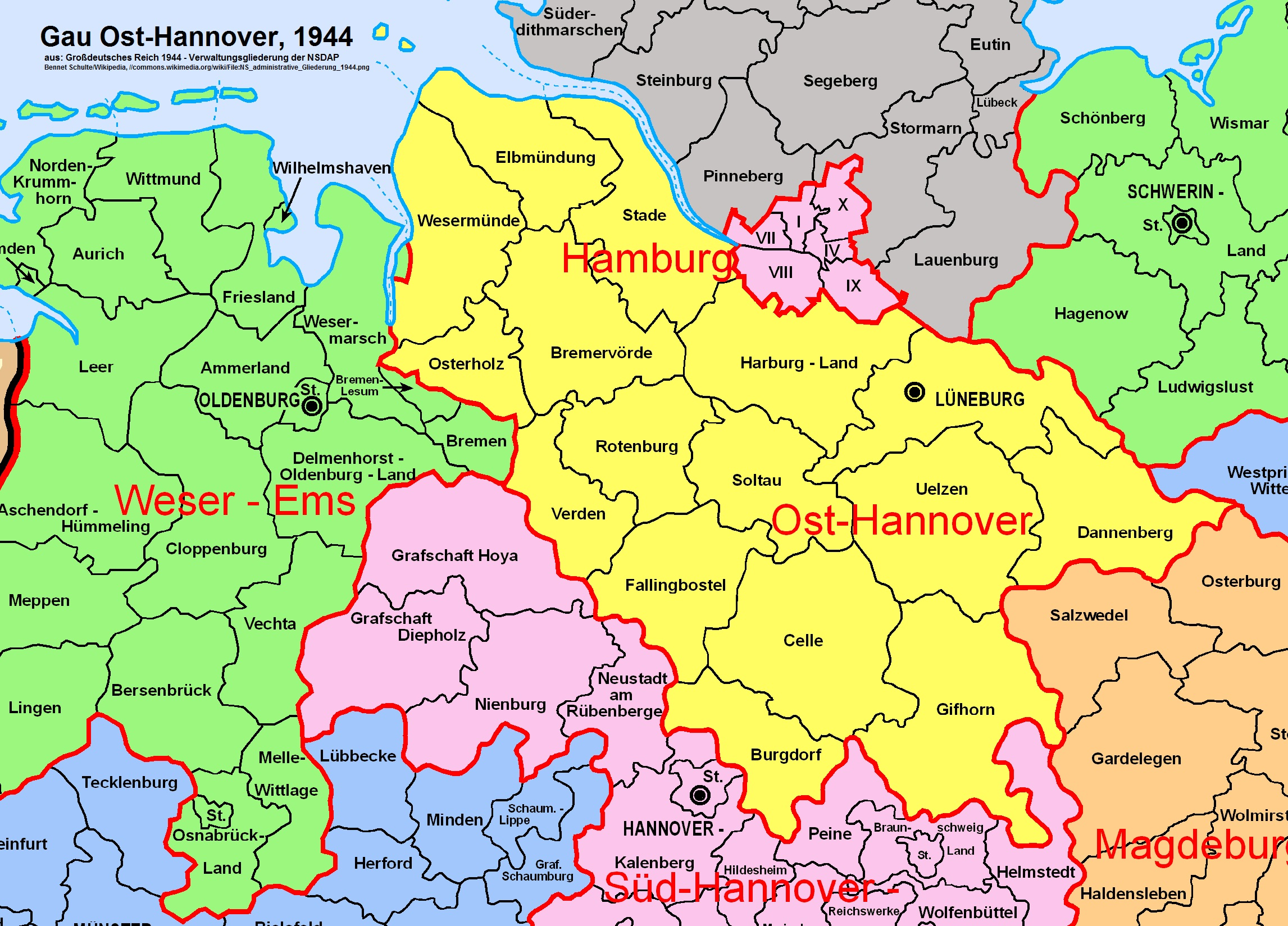
Map of the Gau (NS-administrative district) East Hanover, 1944

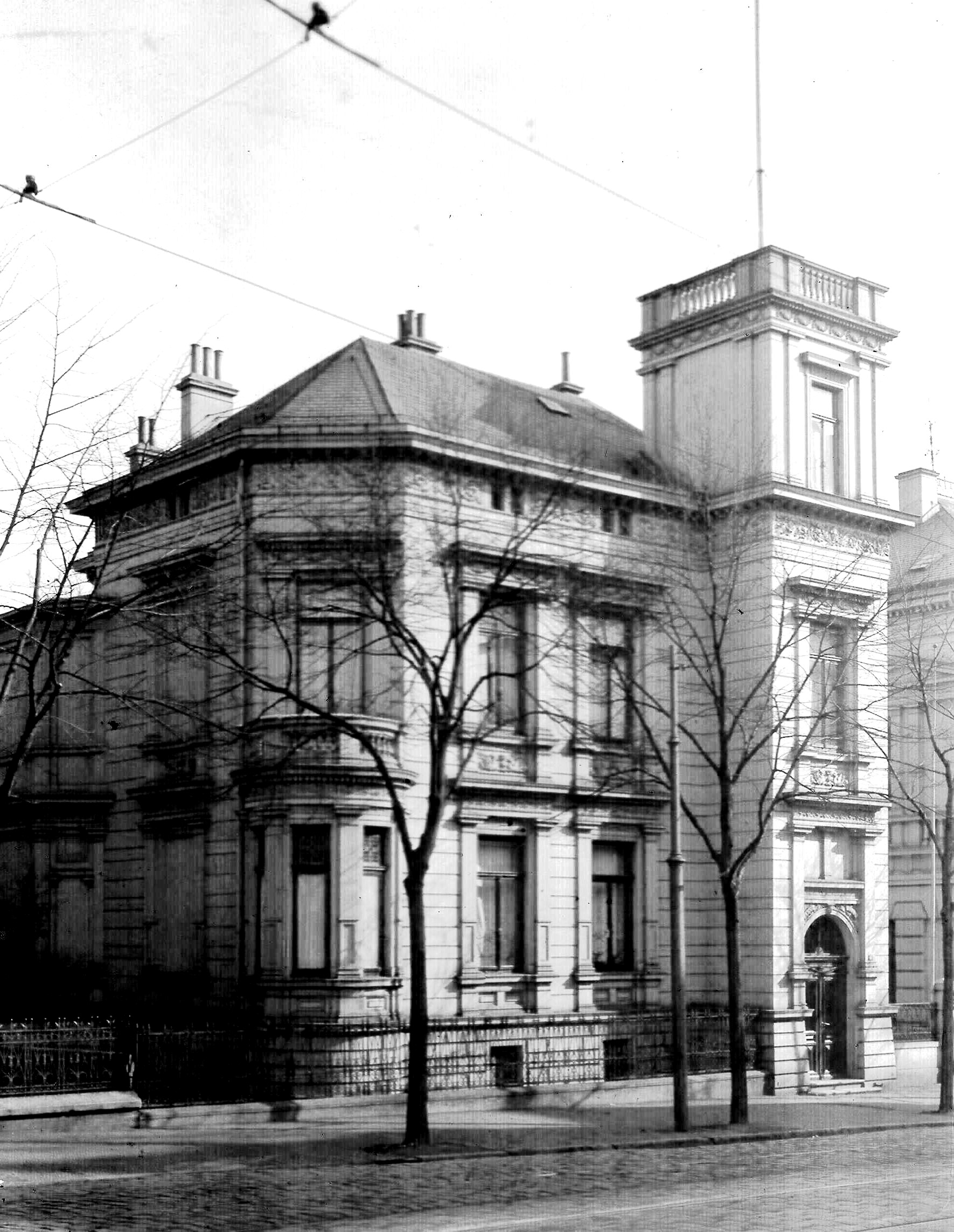
Residence Villa Kohn, Borriestr. 6, Geestemünde, 1929, bombed 1944

In addition to his entrepreneurial activity, Hans Kohnert became known beyond local borders for his political and voluntary work. Hans Kohnert was, among others, member of the supervisory board of Bremer Landesbank Kreditanstalt Oldenburg | Bremer Landesbank and Geestemünder Bank (1941–1967; Chairman: 1951–1967). In World War I Hans Kohn served as a naval officer of the III. Marine Artillery Department at Bremerhaven-Lehe (belonging to the 1st Marine Division of the German Army (German Empire). He served mainly in Fort Brinkamahof III near Weddewarden / Imsum. The fort was constantly manned during World War I, but – like all forts on the Lower Weser – never involved in combat operations. In the last year of the war, 1917/18, First Lieutenant Kohn took part in the Third Battle of Flanders as a company commander. On the occasion of the sailors' uprising in Bremerhaven during the German Revolution of 1918–1919 (November Revolution of 1918) Hans Kohn had to withdraw from public life for some time and devoted himself to painting. That his oeuvre has not yet been included in the canon of local artists from Bremerhaven and the surrounding area, like Klaus Bemmer or Paul Ernst Wilke, was probably because the paintings are almost exclusively in private ownership or were destroyed by the effects of the war.,

For Hans Kohnert, the guiding principle of Hanseatic merchants that had also shaped his father's actions applied: A businessman should not only think about his business and making money, he also has a responsibility to fulfil the common good. His father Franz Kohn was a senator in Geestemünde from 1898 until his death. Fifteen years later, Hans Kohn(ert) carried the same title. Moreover, he became an honorary member of the magistrate of Wesermünde for the local bourgeoisie on 1 December 1924 and held this position until 1929. Shortly after the National Socialists came to power (1933), Hans Kohn ran for president of the Chamber of Industry and Commerce (IHK) Bremerhaven and was elected against the votes of the NSDAP. In 1938 he joined the NSDAP (retroactively from 1937), which awarded him the Golden Party Badge for his services to Bremerhaven's economy. According to his own statement, this happened under pressure from Walter Gravenhorst, the then NSDAP-Chairman of the NS-tribunal of the Gau Hannover-Ost (from May 1932) to protect the IHK from further attacks by the NSDAP.

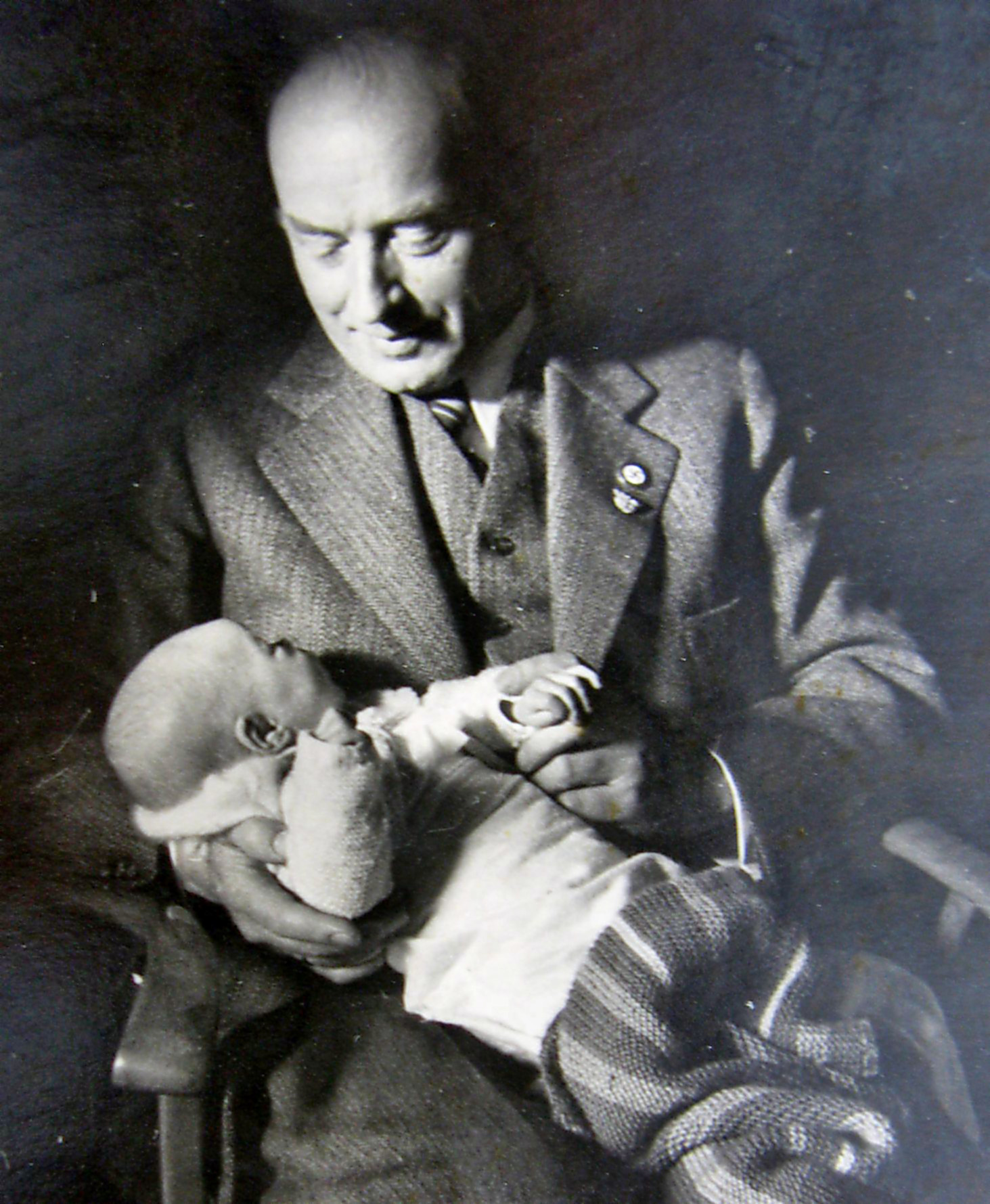
Hans Kohnert at the christening of his first granddaughter with golden NS party badge and Wehrwirtschaftsführer pin, March 1944

From 1933 to 1945 Hans Kohn(ert) was President of the Chamber of Commerce of Bremerhaven. He was also appointed Wehrwirtschaftsführer (1941–1945) and President of the newly created Chamber of Commerce of the 'Gau' of East Hanover (1943–1945), to which the cities of Wesermünde and Lüneburg, including their IHK, were incorporated (1939). "For his successful endeavour to protect the Chamber from state attacks", Kohnert was appointed Honorary President of the IHK in 1951.

After the end of World War II, the American occupying power issued Hans Kohnert a two-year professional ban (1945-1947) and temporarily confiscated his company assets. During this time he lived in a makeshift home in Drangstedt because his villa in Geestemünde had been destroyed during the 1944 bomb raid, and he devoted himself again to painting.

Hans Kohnert resumed timber imports in 1948 and moved to the position of chairman in the supervisory board of the "Geestemünder Bank", to which he had been elected a member since 1941. He took part, albeit more in the background, in political and social events. So he chaired the associations for the promotion of the reconstruction of the city theatre of Bremerhaven and the establishment of the city baths. Kohnert's death also meant a great loss for the United Protestant Congregation of Bremerhaven's Mayor Smidt Memorial Church, which appointed him to its church council in 1949. Since 1950 he had belonged to the three housebuilders. Hans Kohnert represented his congregation in the "Bremischer Kirchentag" (church congress) from 1951 to 1964. Before this, in the 1920s, Kohnert had chaired the charity organization "Geestemünder Ferienkolonie" to give schoolchildren in need free vacations. Besides, he provided a school camp for the "Ferienkolonie" in Bad Bederkesa.

== Awards ==
- Honorary President of the Bremerhaven Chamber of Commerce and Industry (IHK) since 1951
- Honorary member of the Heritage Association of the Männer vom Morgenstern ('Men from the Morning Star').

== Paintings of Hans Kohn from the Bremerhaven area (selection) ==
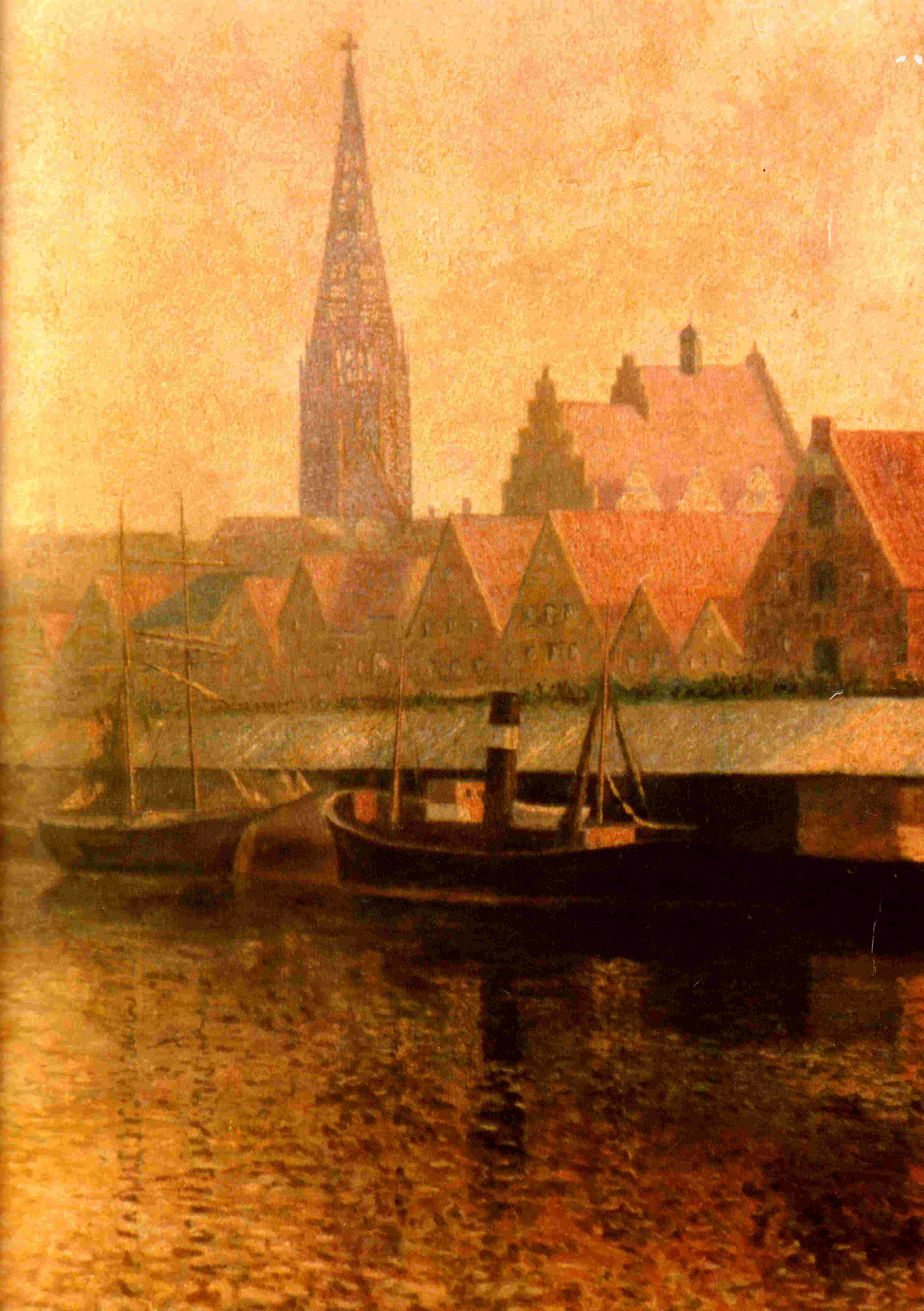
Old port of Bremerhaven (oil on ply wood, 1921)

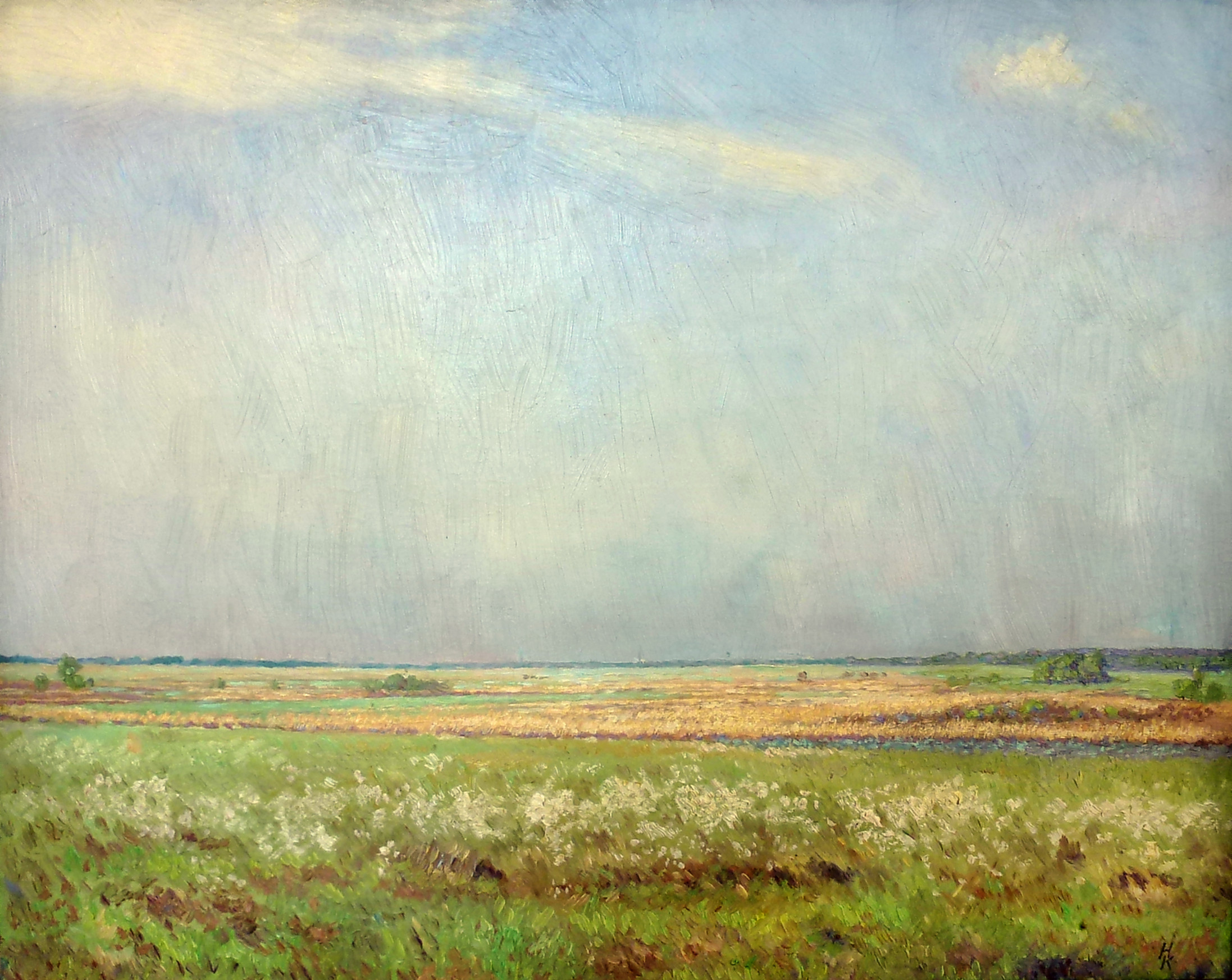
Cloudy landscape and moor near Weddewarden (oil on ply wood, 1921)

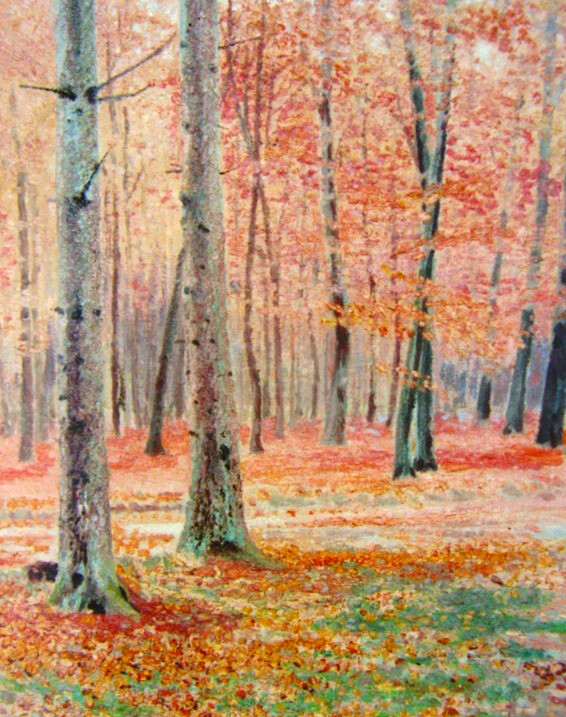
Autumn beech forest (oil on ply wood, 1921)

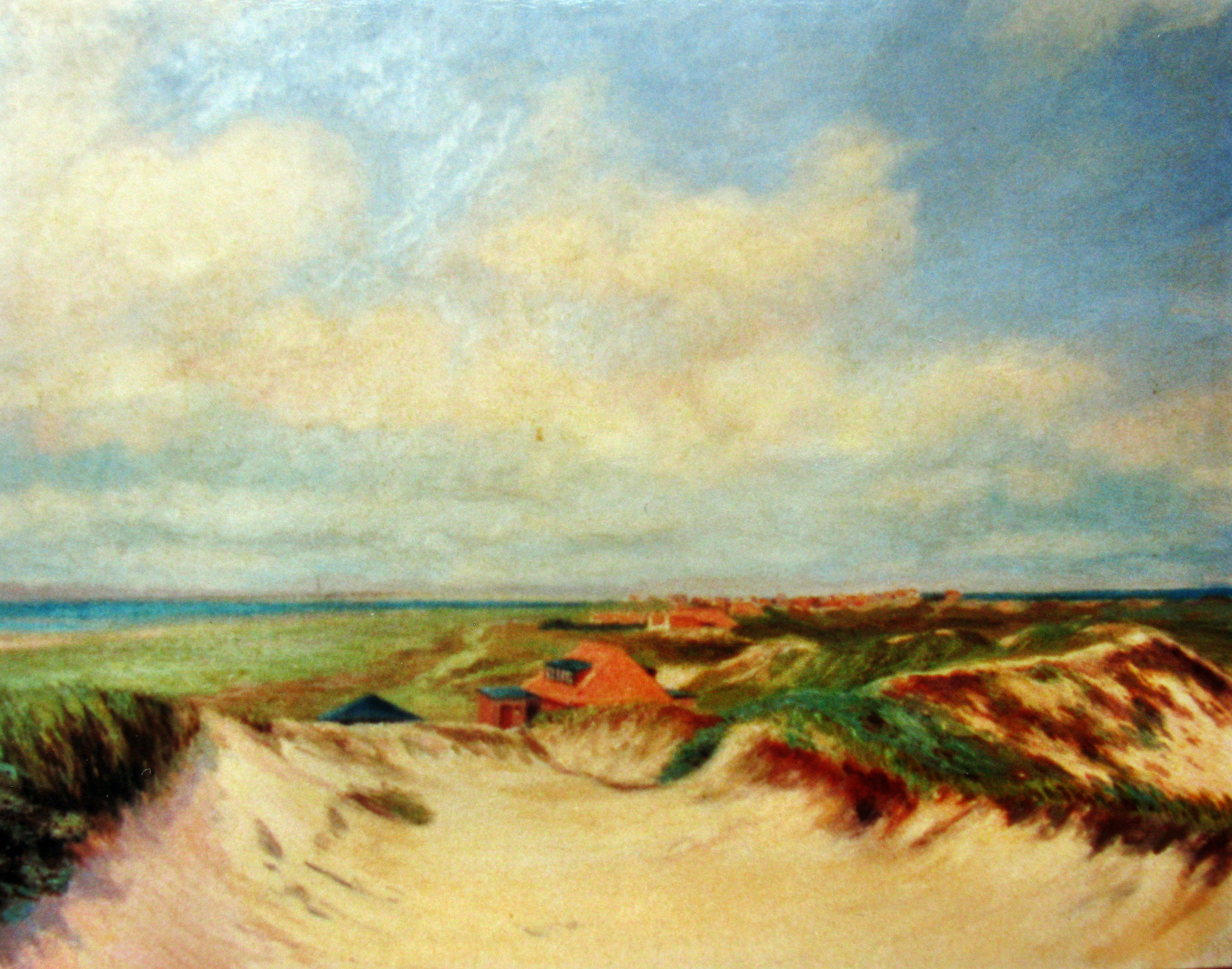
Island dunes on Norderney (oil on ply wood, 1923)

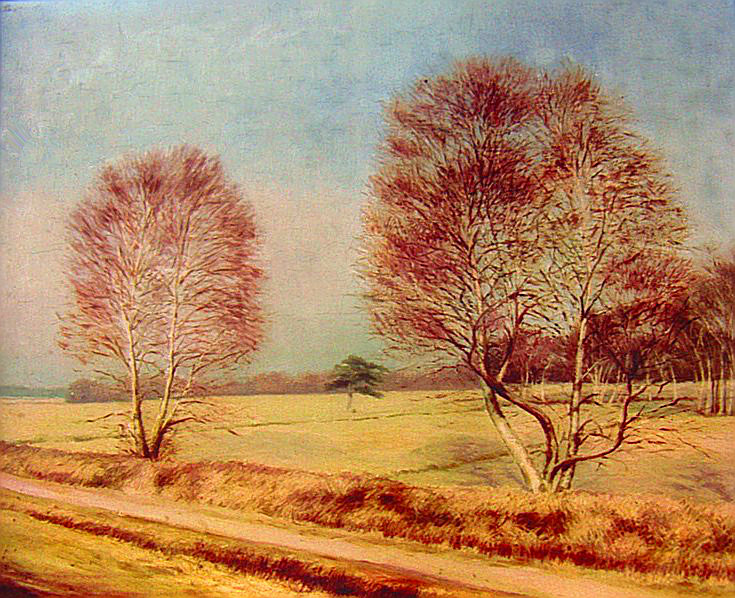
Winter birch landscape (oil on ply wood, 1921)

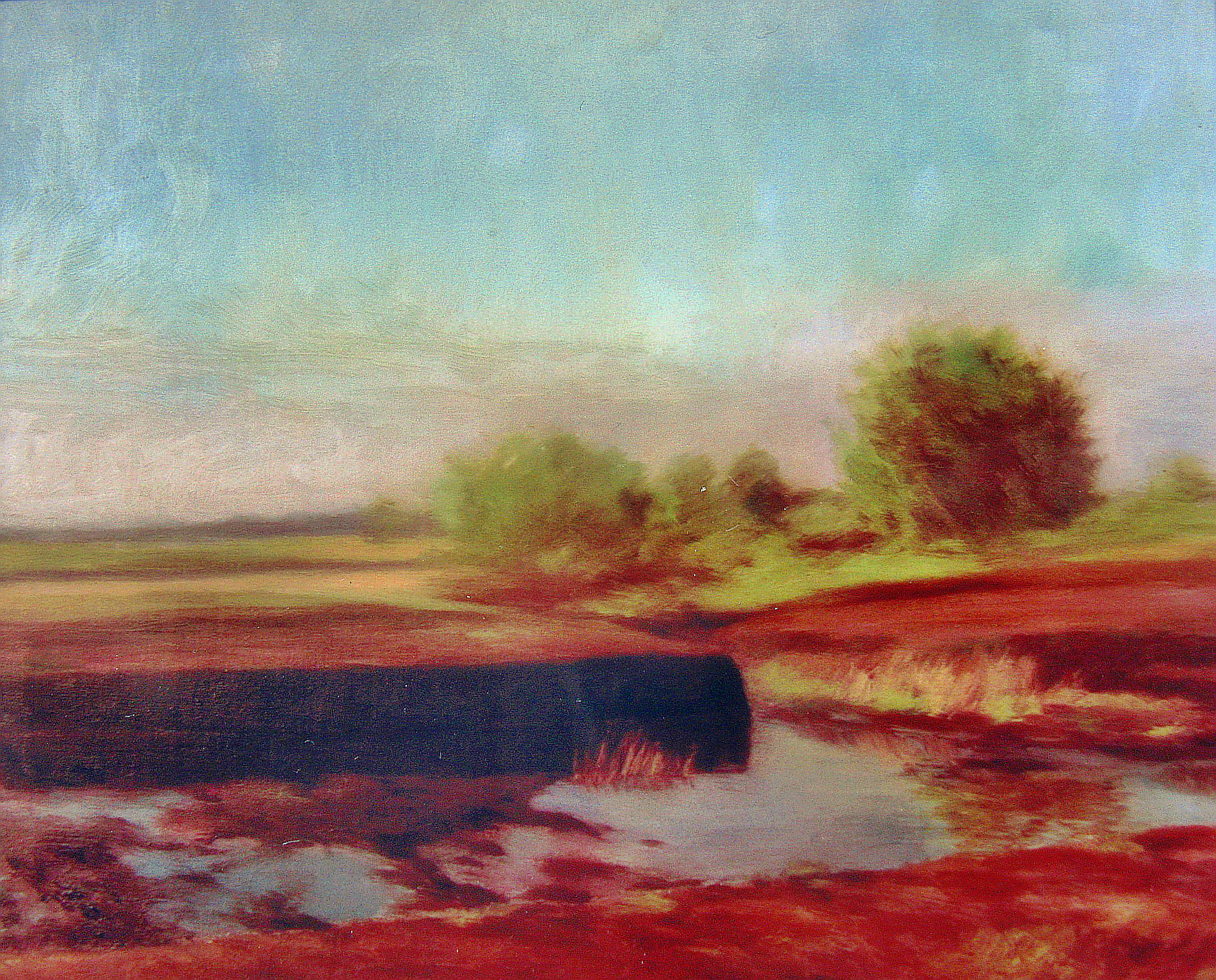
Turf cutting (oil on ply wood, 1921)

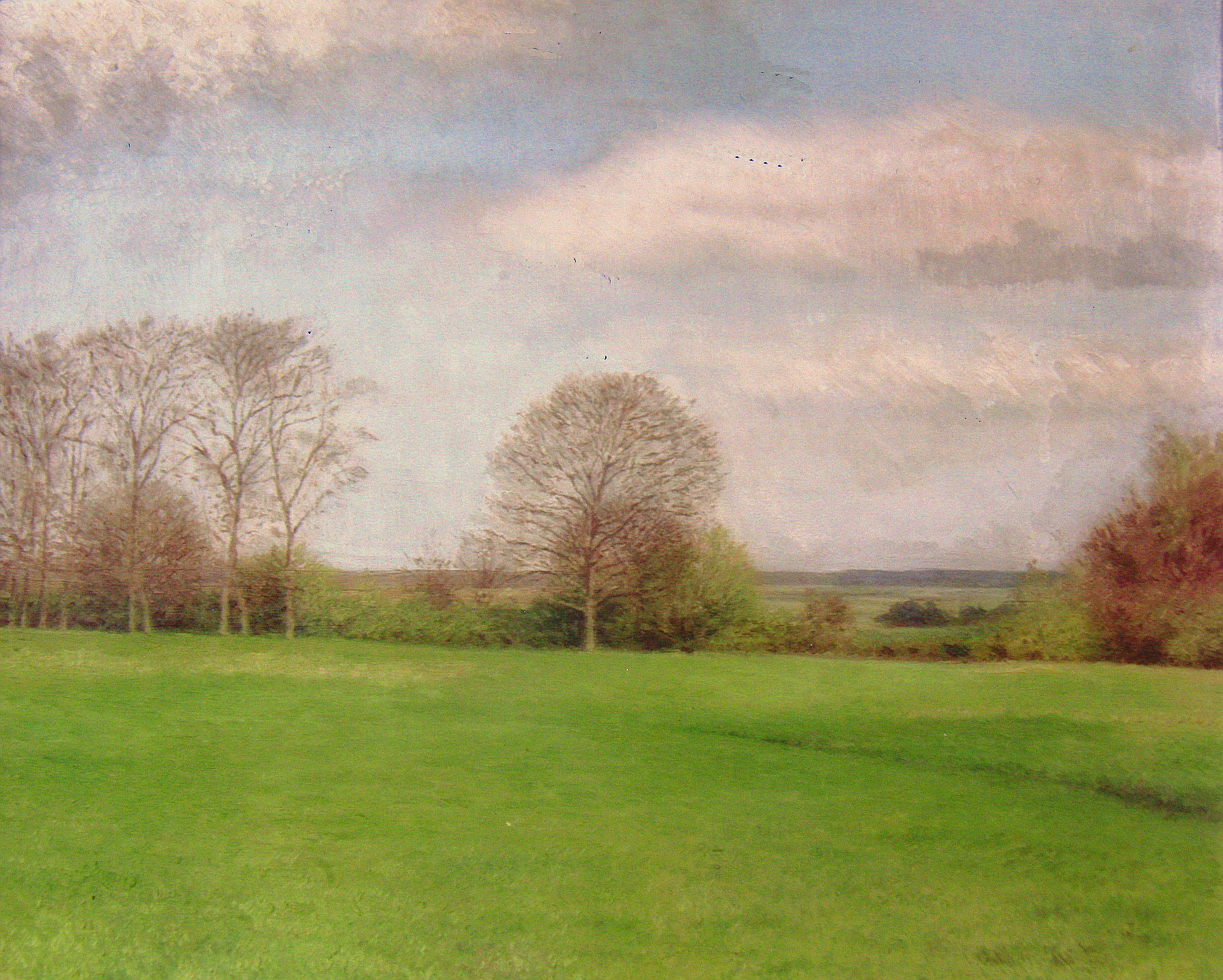
Landscape with Trees and Pasture (oil on ply wood, 1921)

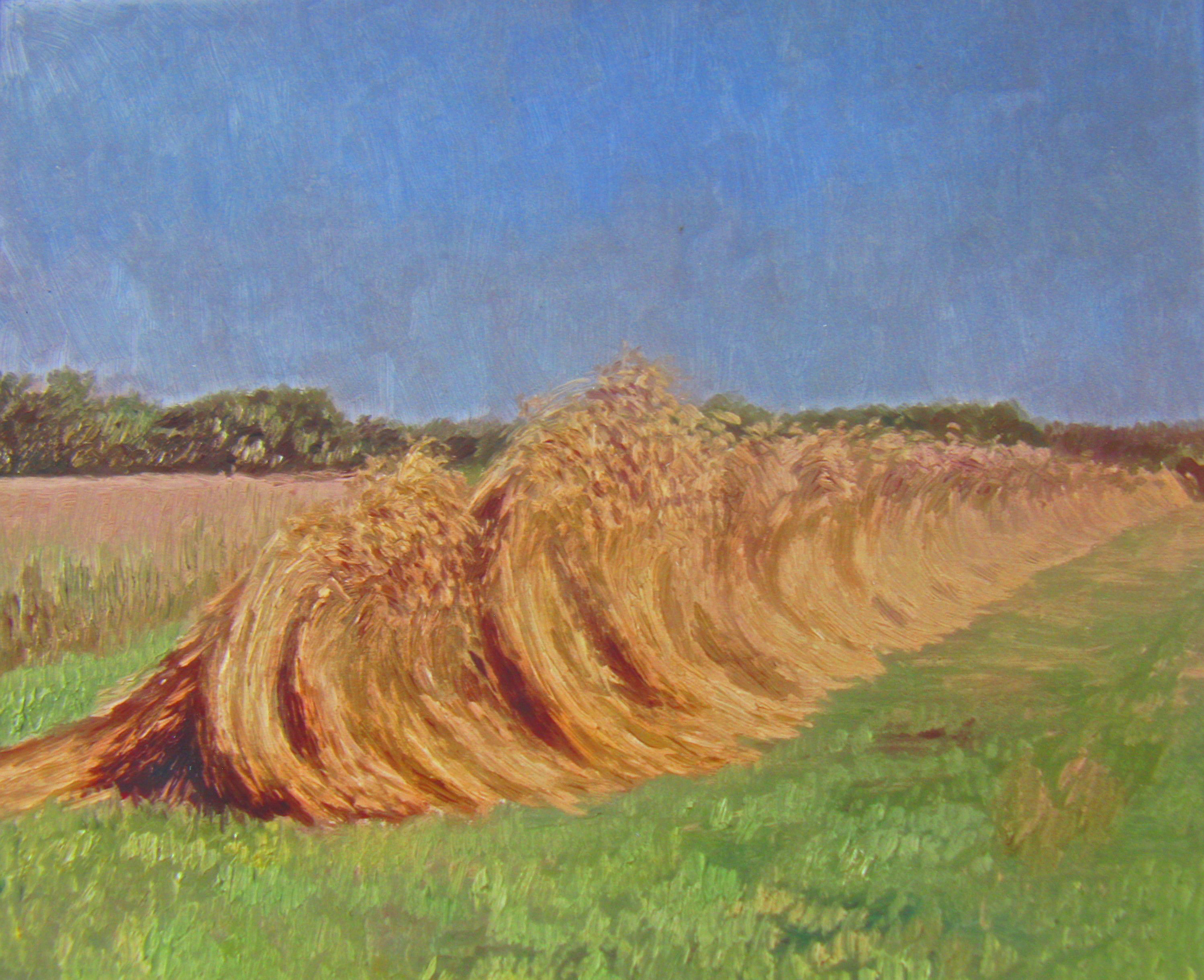
Rye harvest (oil on ply wood, 1920)

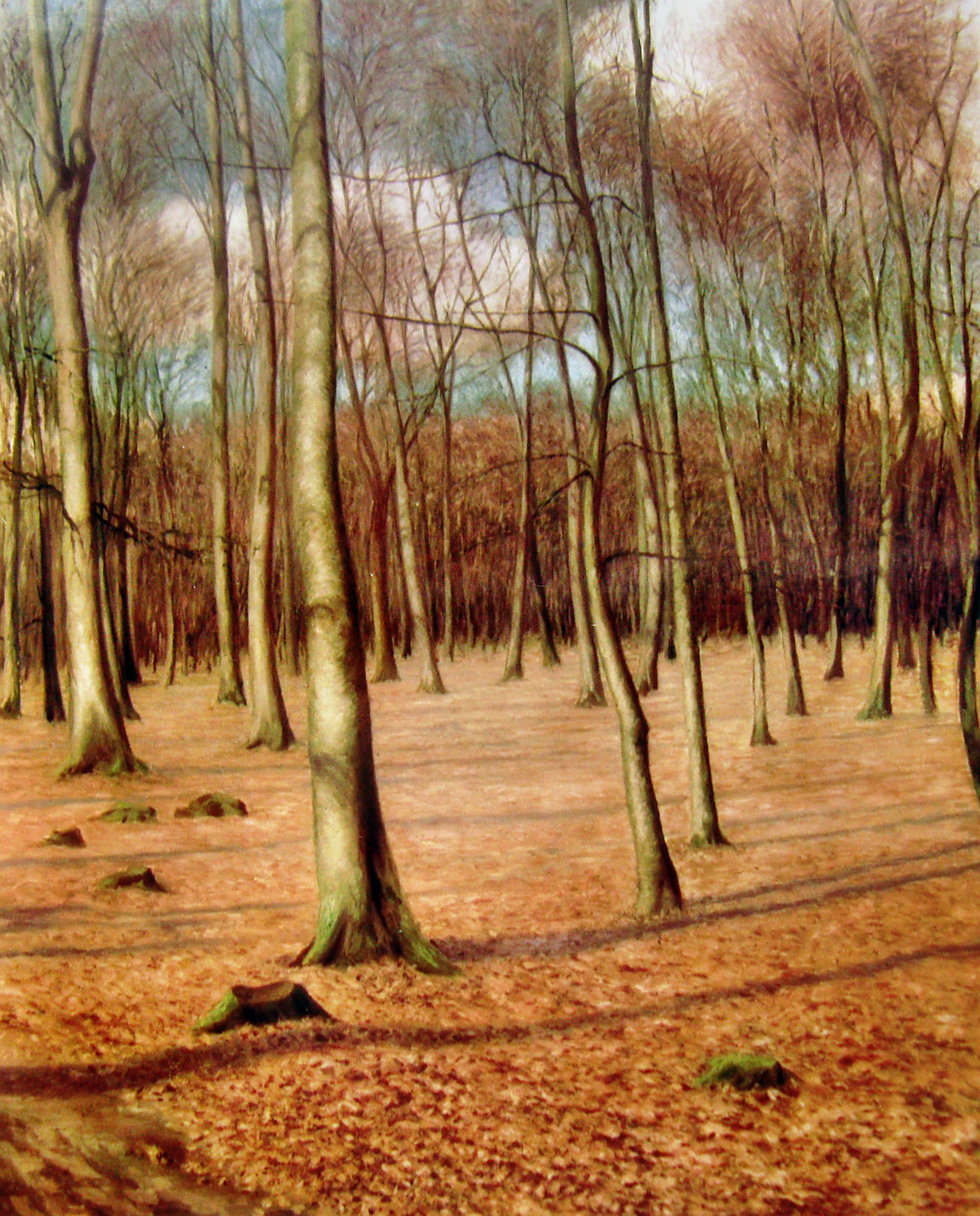
Wintry beech forest (oil on ply wood, 1920)

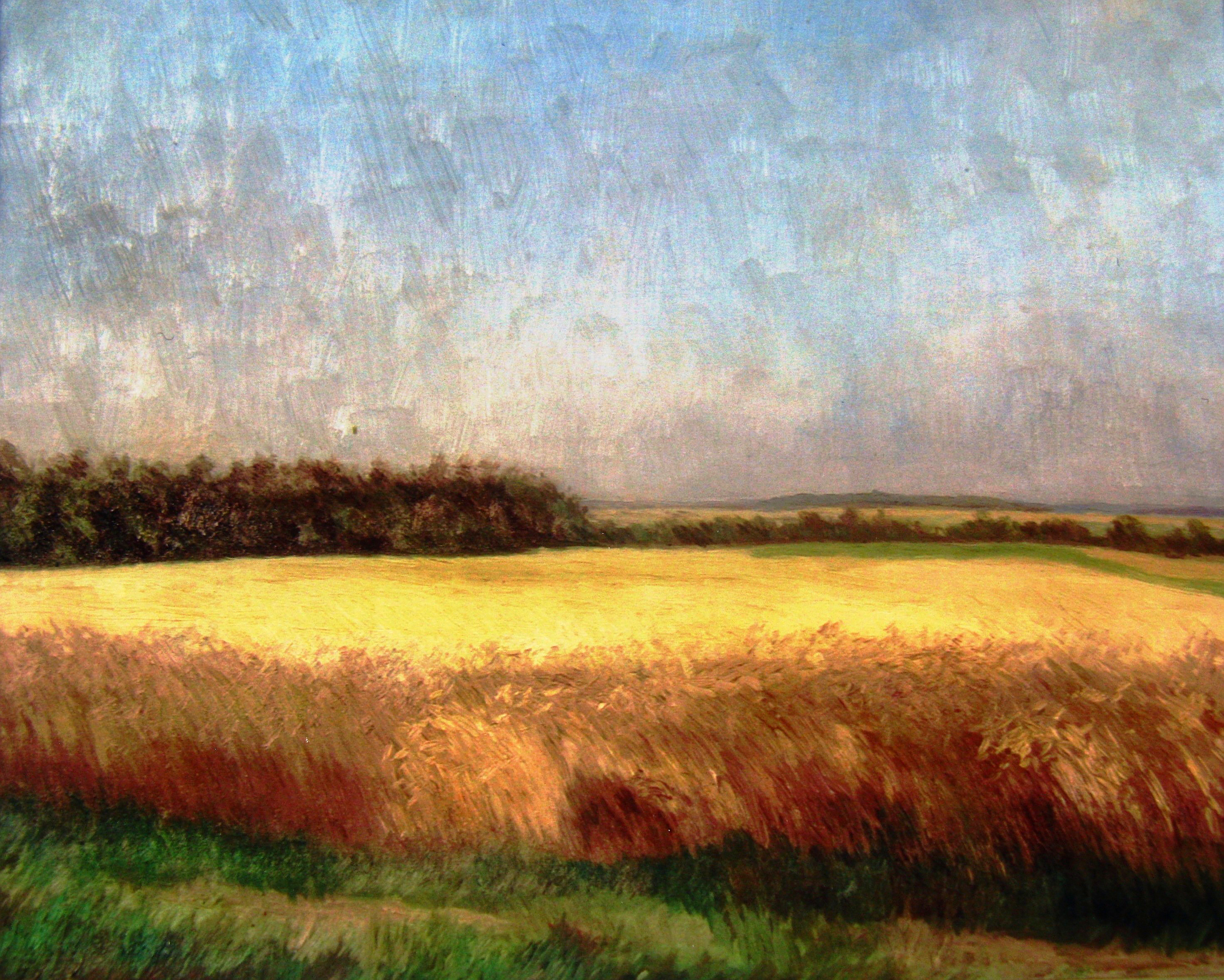
Grainfield (oil on ply wood, 1921)

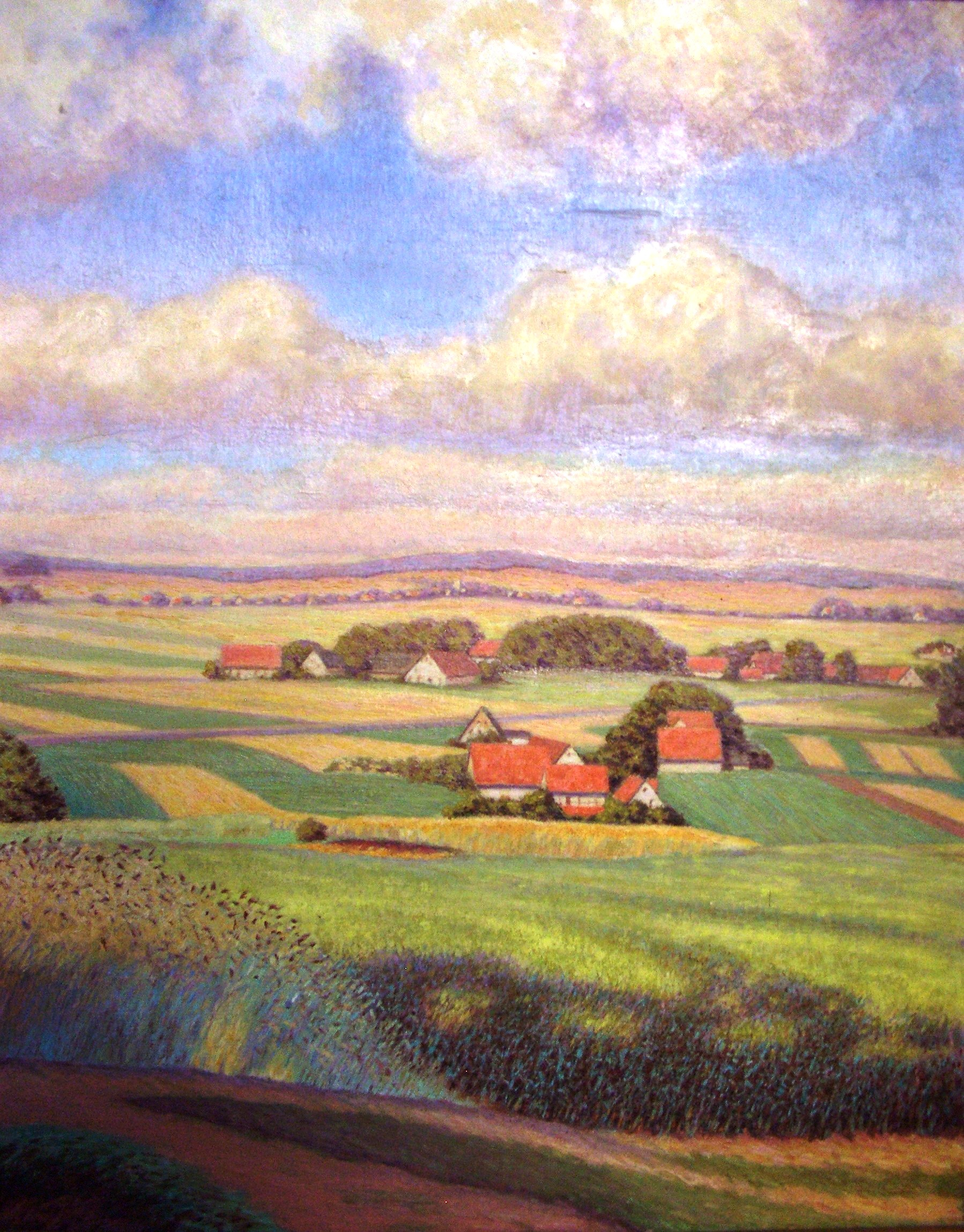
Village under summer sky (oil on ply wood, 1920)

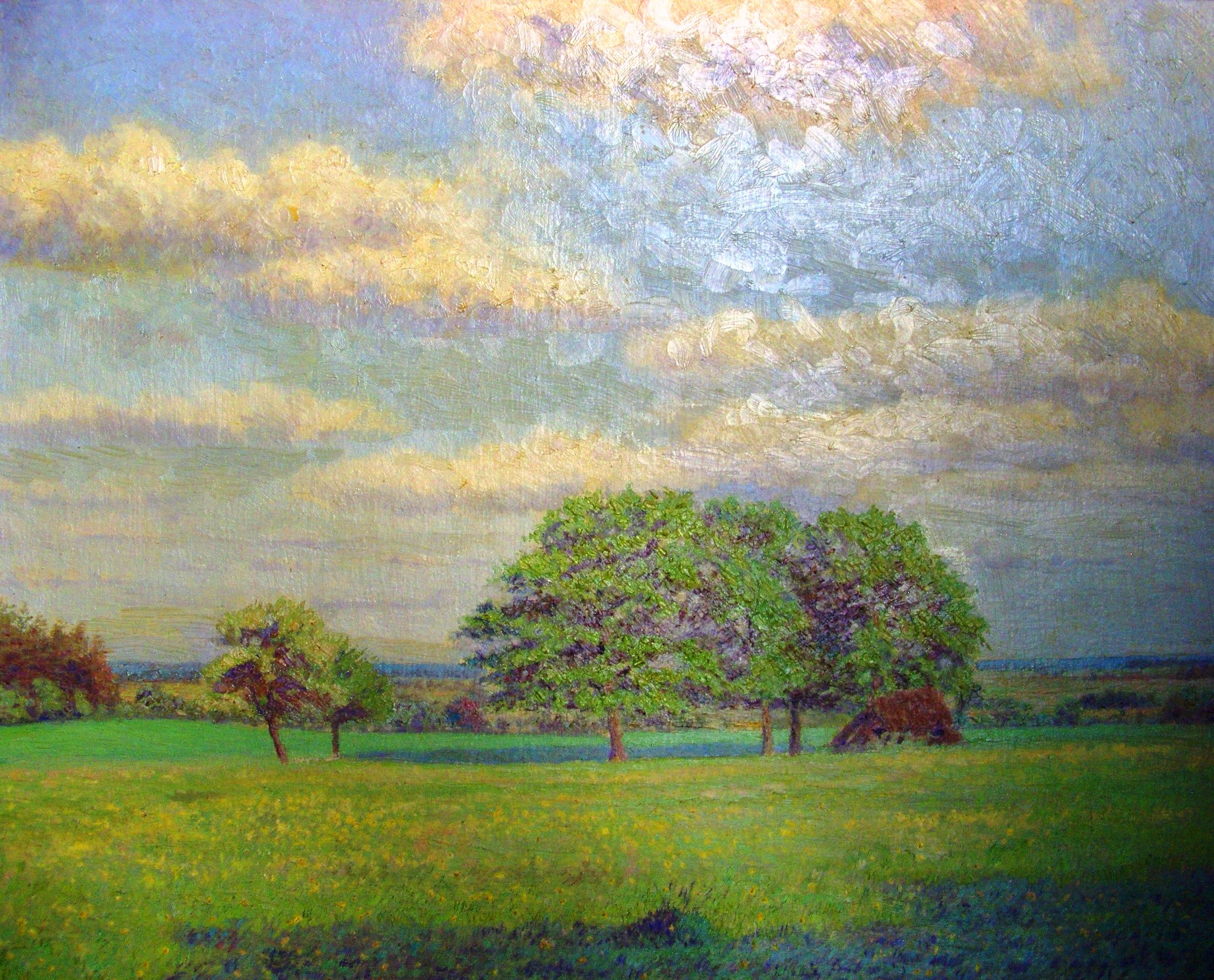
Blooming summer meadow (oil on ply wood, 1920)

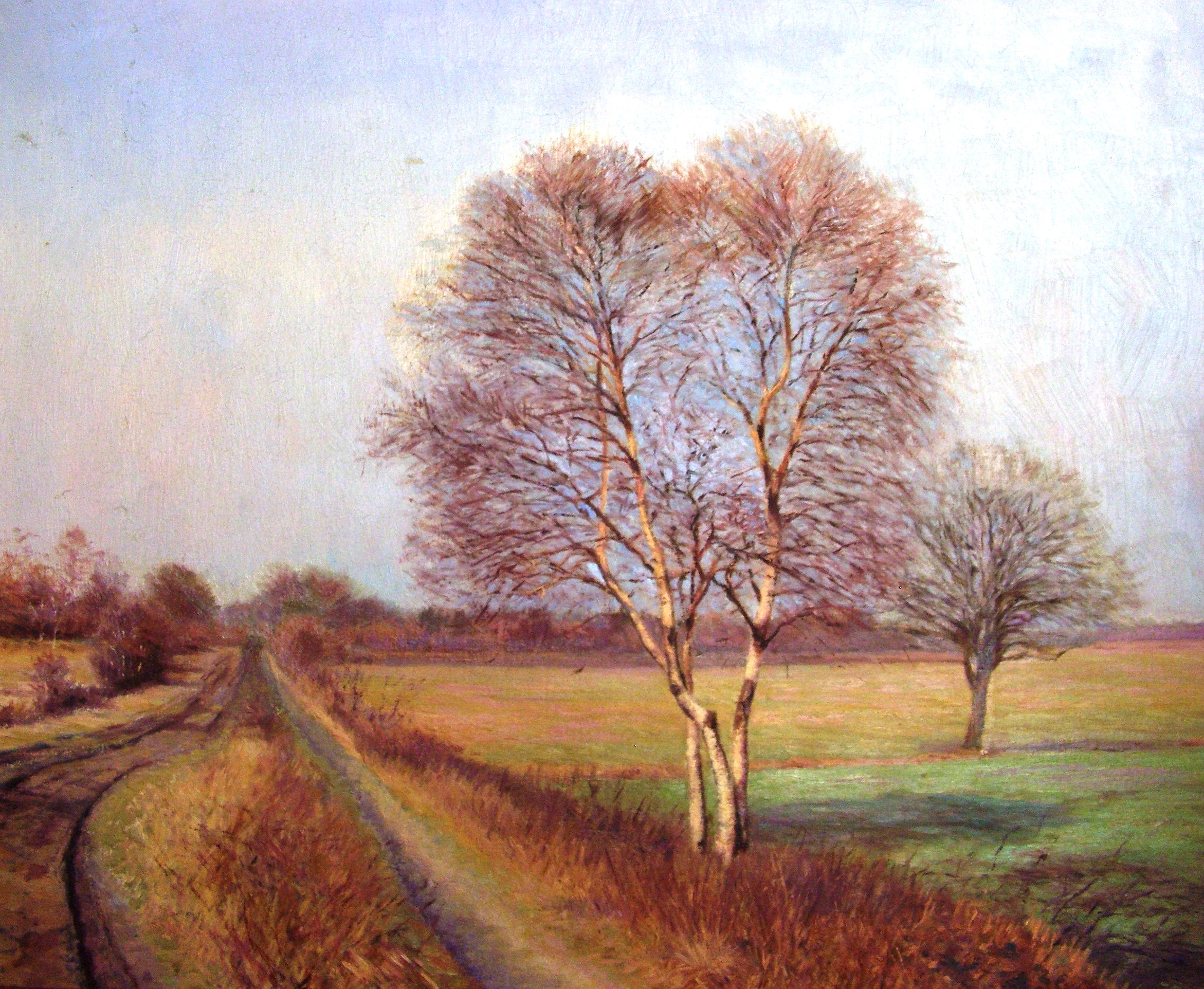
Farm track and birch in autumn (oil on ply wood, 1920)

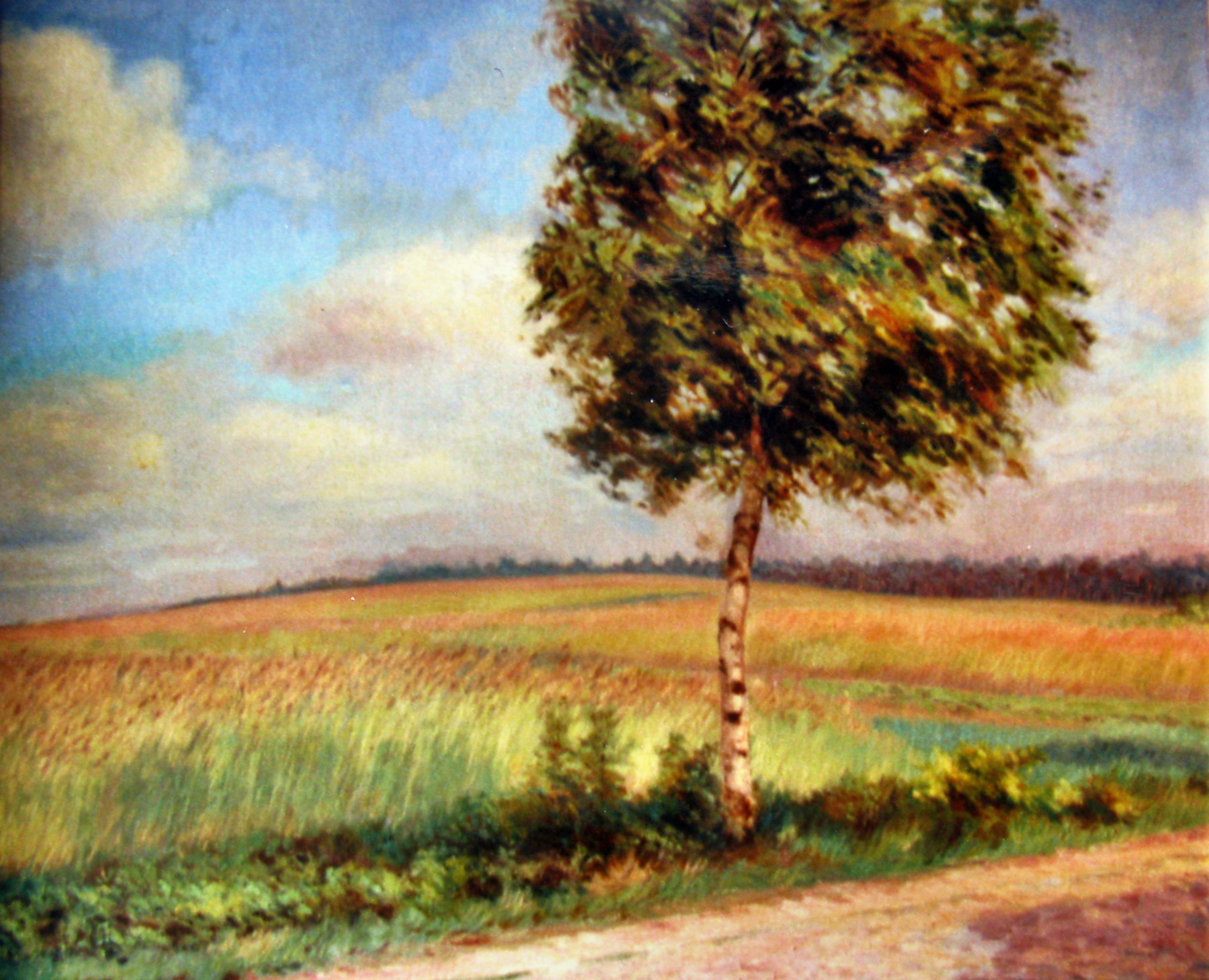
Birch, cornfield and summer sky (oil on ply wood, 1920)

== Bibliography ==
- Paul Hirschfeld: Hannovers Grossindustrie und Grosshandel. ed.: Deutschen Export-Bank, Berlin / Duncker u. Humblot, Leipzig, XVI, 1891, 412 p
- Julius Marchet: Der Holzhandel Norddeutschlands. Publisher: F. Deuticke, Leipzig Wien 1908.
- Fritz Thienst: Aus der Geschichte der Arbeiterbewegung in den Unterweserorten. SPD, Wesermünde 1930, 251 p., incl. images; Stadtarchiv Bremerhaven; here: "Ausschnittskopie über den im Nov. 1918 in Bremerhaven eingerichteten Arbeiter- und Soldatenrat", pp. 143–159.
- Klaus Drobisch: Dokumente über Vorgeschichte und Charakter des faschistischen Wehrwirtschaftsfüher-Korps. In: Zeitschrift für Militärgeschichte vol. 5, 1966, pp. 323–337
- Nachruf auf den verstorbenen Hans Kohnert. In: Nordsee-Zeitung, Bremerhaven 12 January 1967
- Burchhard Scheper: Die jüngere Geschichte der Stadt Bremerhaven. Bremerhaven: Magistrat der Stadt Bremerhaven (ed.)
- Harry Gabcke: Hans Kohnert vor 100 Jahren geboren. In: Niederdeutsches Heimatblatt, newsletter of the association 'Männer vom Morgenstern' (MvM). Bremerhaven, November 1987, No. 455.
- Rainer Schulze: Unternehmerische Selbstverwaltung und Politik – Die Rolle der Industrie- und Handelskammern in Niedersachsen und Bremen als Vertretung der Unternehmerinteressen nach dem Ende des Zweiten Weltkrieges. Publisher: August Lax, Hildesheim 1988
- Hartmut Bickelmann: Von Geestendorf nach Geestemünde – Räumlicher, gewerblicher und sozialer Strukturwandel im Umkreis des Geestermünder Holzhafens. In: Männer vom Morgenstern. Yearbook No. 75, 1996, pp. 149–235
- Hartmut Bickelmann (ed.): Bremerhavener Persönlichkeiten aus vier Jahrhunderten. Ein biographisches Lexikon. 2nd extended and updated edition. Bremerhaven 2003, pp. 172–174.
- IHK (2000): 125 Jahre IHK-Bremerhaven; 1925–1950, Liberal auch in schwierigen Zeiten. Bremerhaven. Publisher: Industrie- und Handelskammer (IHK), anniversary publication.
