= Gerhard Kohnert =

German entrepreneur (1882–1962)

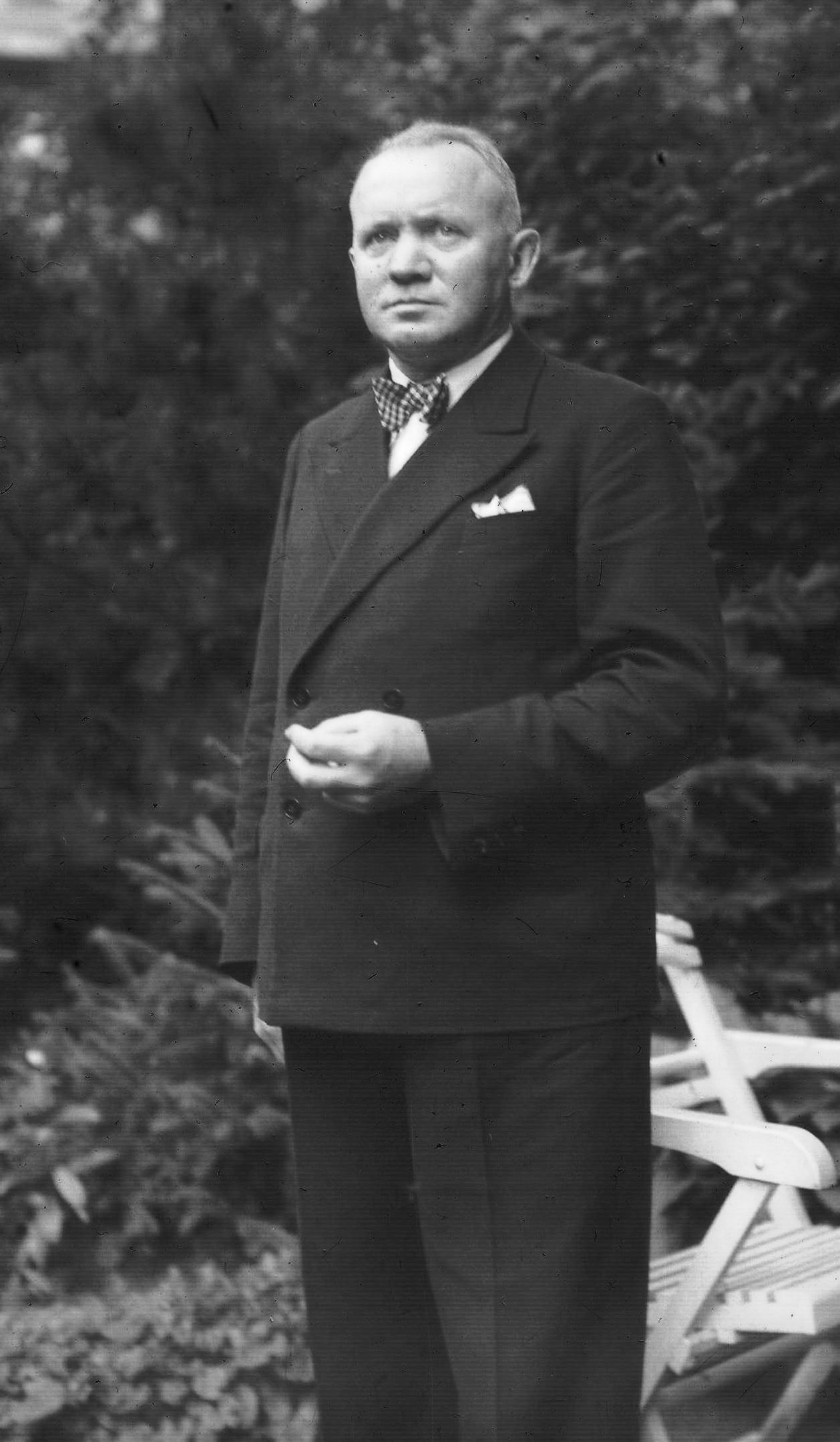
- Gerhard Kohn (before renaming, 1937)
- Born: 2 September 1882; Geestemünde, Kingdom of Hanover Germany
- Died: 5 July 1962 (aged 79); Melle, Germany
- Education: Handelshochschule Leipzig
- Occupations: entrepreneur and Chairman

Gerhard Kohnert (September 2, 1882, in Geestemünde – July 5, 1962, in Melle) was a German entrepreneur, furniture manufacturer, local politician and sponsor of local cultural institutions.

== Life ==
Gerhard Kohnert was born as Gerhard Kohn, son of Franz Kohn (* December 23, 1857; † September 24, 1909) and his wife Johanna, née Gehrels (* December 24, 1862; † December 24, 1925) in Geestemünde as the first son. His brother, who was four years his junior, was the entrepreneur and President of the Chamber of Commerce Hans Kohnert.

After attending the Realgymnasium in Bremerhaven, the 17-year-old Gerhard Kohn began his years of apprenticeship and travel (1900–1908): first two semesters at the Handelshochschule Leipzig, then two more semesters at the Cologne School of Management. This was followed by commercial positions in Geestemünde, Lübeck, in Wiborg (Finland) in the Kramfors sawmill in the Härnösand district in northern Sweden and finally two years in London and one year in the United States.

Gerhard Kohnert was not married and had no children. Because of hostilities due to the Jewish-sounding family name Kohn / Cohn under Nazism, his brother Hans applied for a name change to 'Kohnert' for the family and for the affected companies in Geestemünde and Melle in 1937, which was officially approved on August 14, 1937. Gerhard Kohnert died on July 5, 1962, at the age of 78 in Melle after a short illness.

== Achievements ==
In 1909, after the death of his father, Gerhard Kohn joined the parents' parent company, the wood import and wood processing company Pundt & Kohn in Geestemünde, as general manager, in which he also became a partner in 1912, together with his brother Hans, who took over the management of the company after his father's death (1909). From 1912 to 1924 he was also a member of the Bremerhaven Chamber of Industry and Commerce (IHK)

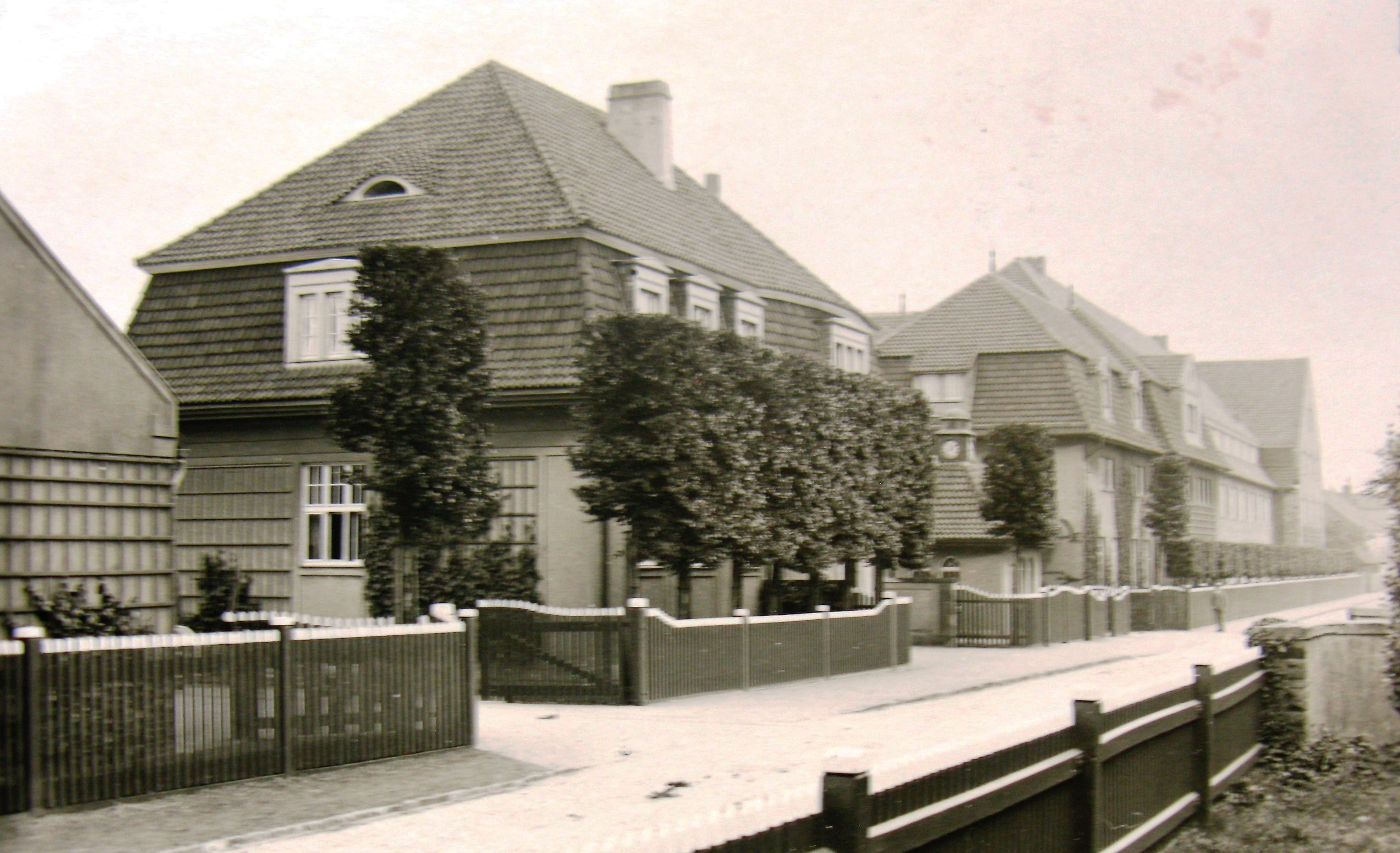
Meller Möbelfabrik, 1929

In 1909 Gerhard Kohn founded the Meller Möbelfabrik GmbH (MMM) in Melle, near Osnabrück, which he managed until his death (1962). He recognized early on that in the vicinity of the so-called "furniture basin" (Herford, Detmold, East Westphalia-Lippe), i.e. in a structurally weak region between Wiehen Hills and Teutoburg Forest, particularly good conditions existed for the development of a furniture industry: Rich beech and oak forests supplied the raw materials, high unemployment and low wages ensured low unit costs, the large land requirement of the space-intensive furniture production could be covered here inexpensively. In addition, the connection to the railway network to the rapidly developing furniture sales markets in the nearby Ruhr area, and later also in the Rhineland and Saarland, meant favorable development conditions for furniture production.

After all, there were special terms and conditions during the two world wars, e.g. with the fabrication of ammunition boxes and aircraft parts produced under the restrictive laws of the military administration. Also, in World War II, the production of the MMM was switched to wartime tasks.

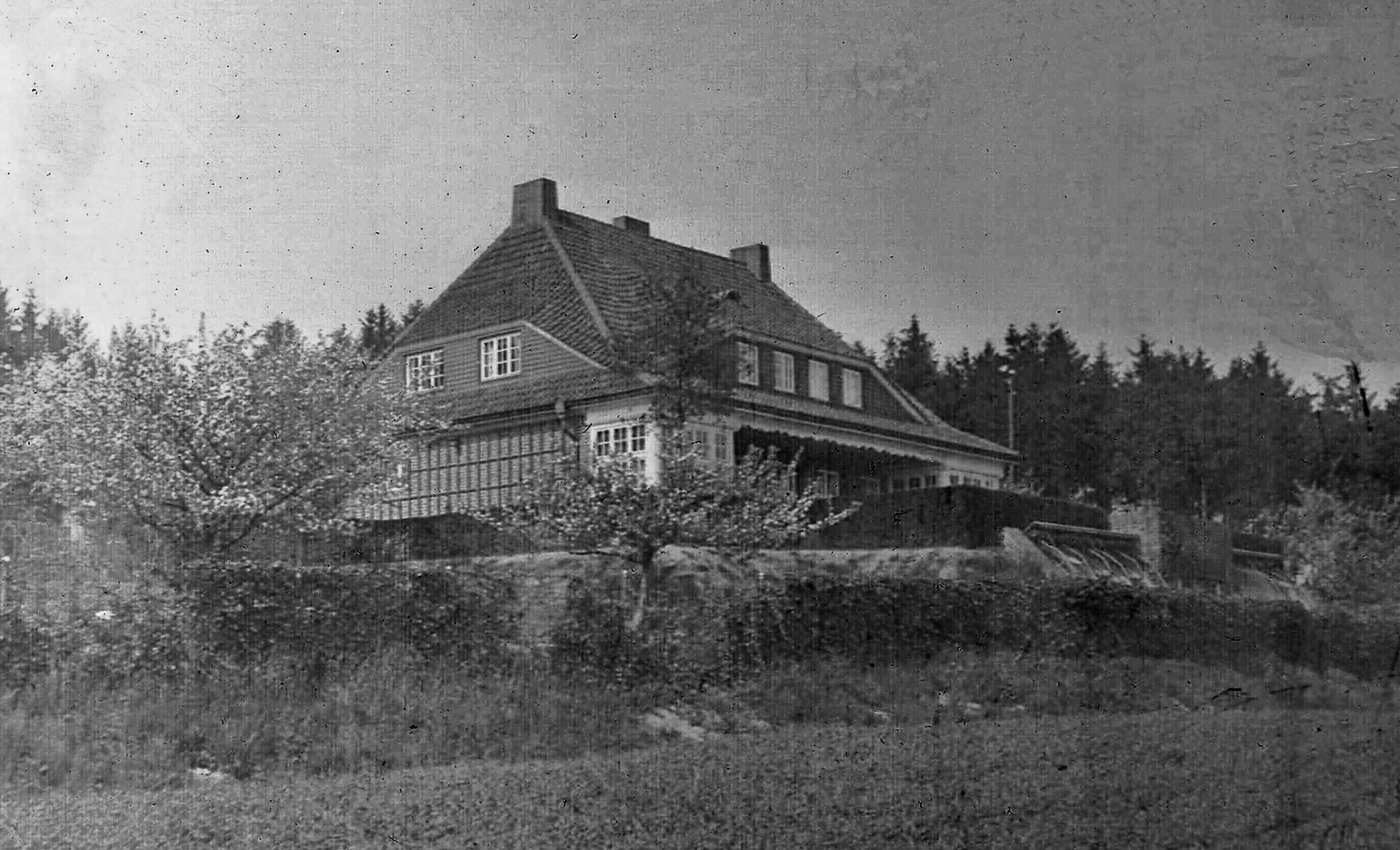
Kohn's Villa „Haus Sonneck“, 1930

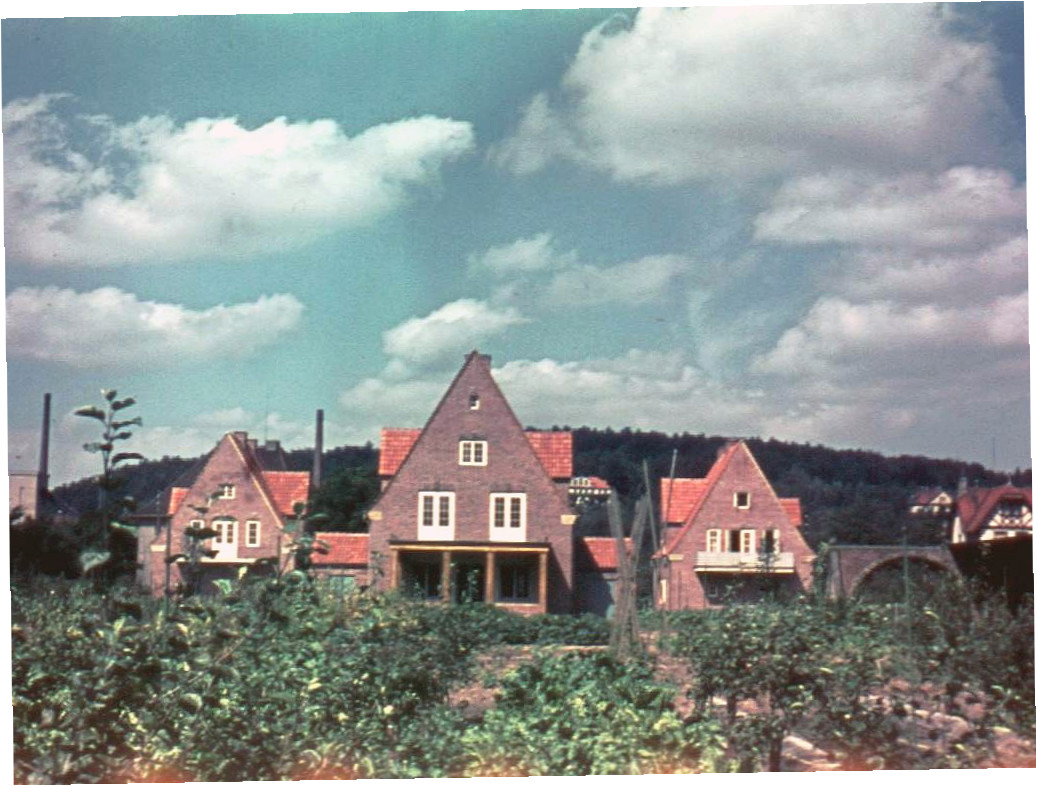
listed MMM company flats, 1956

After the end of the war, British troops under Field Marshal Bernard Montgomery occupied the region and confiscated Kohnert's villa "Haus Sonneck" on Meller Berg (1945–1955). Montgomery set up his temporary headquarters in neighboring Gut Ostenwalde (Melle-Oldendorf). Kohnert then initially lived in the company's office building, before in the early 1950s he built three new residential buildings on the factory premises as company apartments in Teichbruchstraße, today Bismarckstr. No. 13-17 (since 1967 under monument protection as an ensemble), for himself and his manager and authorized signatory.

Under the direction of Gerhard Kohnert, the MMM gained a national reputation after the war. It was known as a manufacturer of dignified and innovative living room and office furniture, e.g. of licensed furniture in the Bauhaus style for the Bremen workshops. However, the progressive industrialization and internationalization of the furniture industry in the 1960s to 1970s also led to a concentration on ever larger and more modern companies in this region and to the abandonment of those who could not keep up with this process.

== Oeuvre ==
World War I experienced Gerhard Kohn, then 31 years old, as a war volunteer on all fronts and was wounded twice. "He was well-known and popular in Melle. ... He promoted the Meller fire brigade and the Meller children's choir and was a co-founder of the Meller Volksbank in 1921. In 1928 he was the champion shot of the Meller guilt and finally an honorary member."

After the end of World War II, the British military government endeavored to find new, unencumbered and freely elected local political leaders in Melle after twelve years of Nazism. "On November 14, 1945, the members of the city committee of the military government proposed the formation of a "Bürgervorsteher-Kollegium" (city council) of 20 people based on the model of the Weimar Republic. The military government called the newly formed body the "city council" and approved the composition on December 19, 1945. On January 9, 1946, the city council met for its constituent session and, with the approval of Colonel Wilcox, elected the furniture manufacturer Gerhard Kohnert as mayor. The previous mayor Dr. Freiherr von Massenbach took over the newly created office of 'City Director'". "Because of his upright German attitude, however, he was deposed again after a few months. ... In terms of his nature, Gerhard Kohnert made little public appearances. However, the fire-fighting Melle found special support through him. 25 years ago he already emphasized his solidarity with the people by winning the royal dignity of the rifle club. Averse to any association activity, he allows the Meller Children's Choir to benefit from his special support." On the occasion of his 70th birthday, the manufacturer Gerhard Kohnert was awarded the Federal Cross of Merit by District President Friemann on September 2, 1953, for his services to the development of the domestic furniture industry. According to the 'Meller Kreisblatt', this rare and high award was presented for the third time in the district of Melle.

== distinction ==
- 1953: Order of Merit of the Federal Republic of Germany

== Literature ==
- Oliver Bonkamp: Kooperationen und Netzwerke in der Möbelindustrie der Region Ostwestfalen-Lippe. Dissertation. Universität Paderborn, 2005.
- Meller Kreisblatt: 60 Jahre kommunale Selbstverwaltung in Melle. 'Meller Kreisblatt', October 11, 2006.
