= Gesmold =

Coordinates: 52°13′N 8°16′E

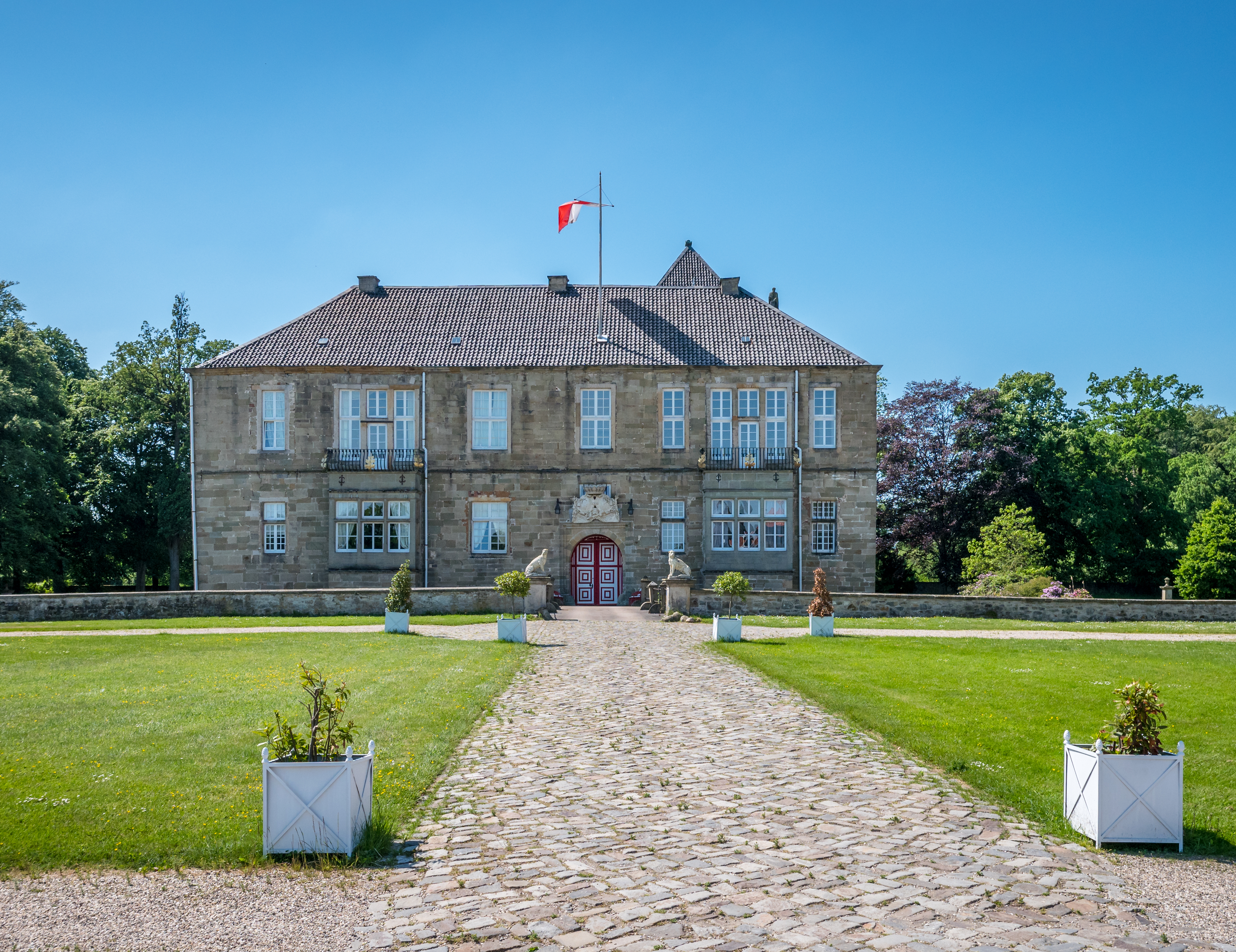
Entrance to Gesmold Castle

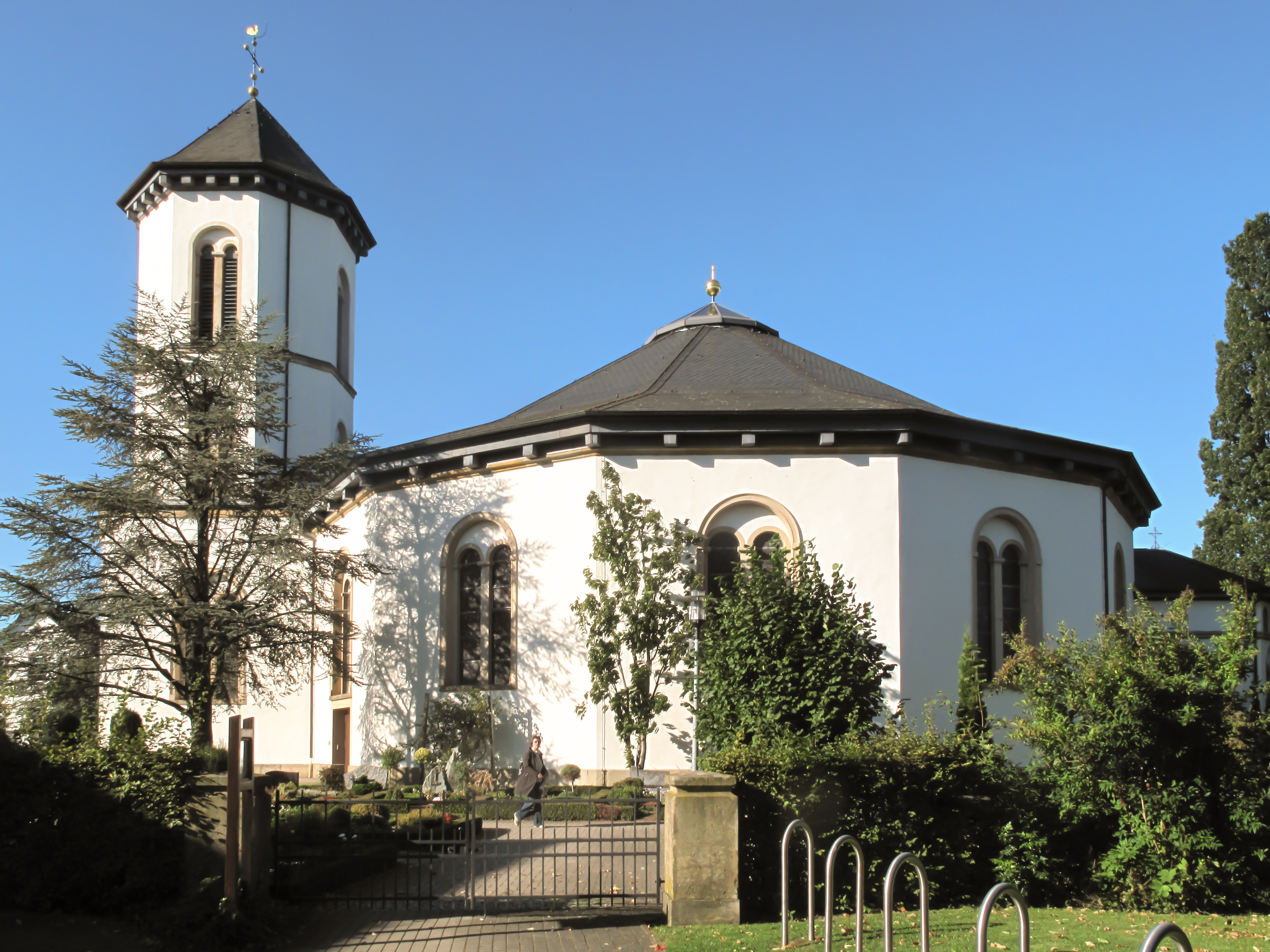
St. Peters Church of Gesmold

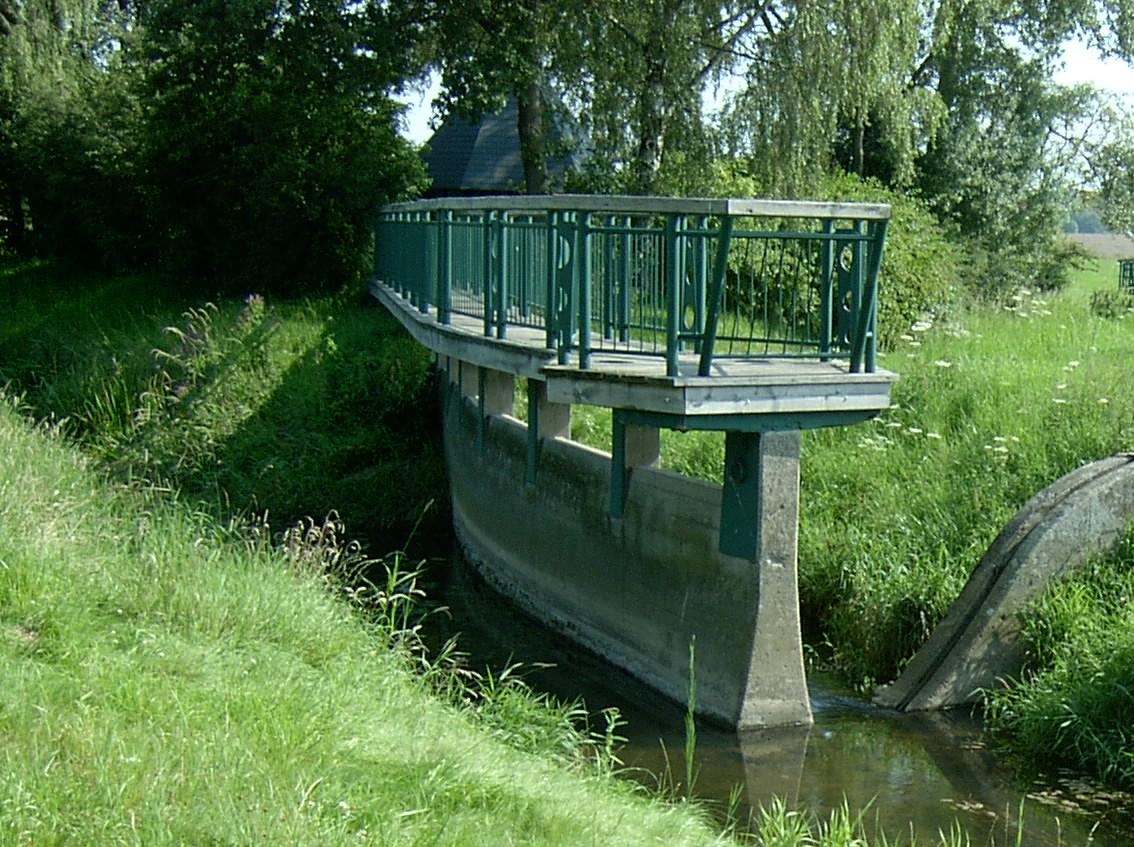
River bifurcation in Gesmold: Hase (left) and Else (right)

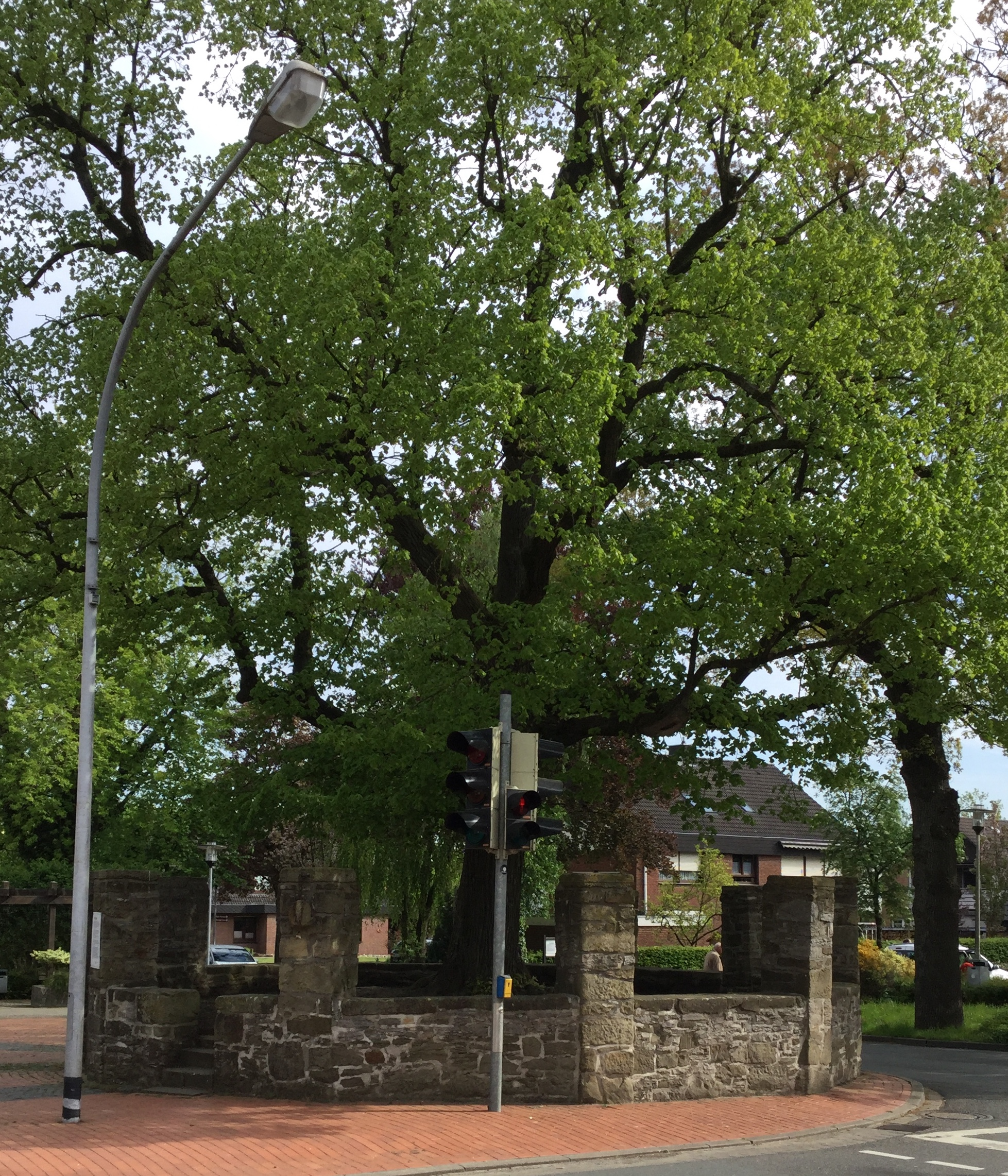
Gesmolder Gerichtslinde

Gesmold is a town and former municipality, now part of Melle, in the district of Osnabrück, in Lower Saxony, Germany. It is placed between the Wiehengebirge and the Teutoburg Forest.

It features Gesmold Castle, a Renaissance building. Another interesting place is the Church of St. Peter.

== Important persons of Gesmold ==
- Hermann von Amelunxen (died 1580), Baron
- Ludwig von Hammerstein (1702–1796), Baron
- Johann Matthias Seling (1792–1860), Professor and Priest in Osnabrück
- Mathias Schürmann, Professor, from 1828 to 1866 Priest in Gesmold
- Ludwig von Hammerstein (1832–1905), Jesuit and writer
- Wilhelm Joachim von Hammerstein (1838–1904), German politician
- Conrad Seeling, (19. Jh.) painter and builder
- Bernhard Olthaus (1862–1952), Dekan
- Hans von Hammerstein (1867–1933), German General of the Infanterie
- Fritjof von Hammerstein, (1870–1944), German Generalleutnant
- August Niehaus (1880–1961), teacher and writer
- Heinrich Rahe (1892–1975), teacher and poet
- Heinrich Stühlmeyer (1907–1978), a "silent hero of the resistance" against National Socialism, who was deported to the concentration camp Emslandlager in 1940 for his support of the Catholic church and those persecuted by the Third Reich, had been employed at St. Peter's Gesmold for 47 years.

== Sources ==
- Ludger Stühlmeyer: Die Orgel der St. Petrus-Kirche Gesmold. In Uwe Pape: Orgelatlas, Berlin 1980, ISBN 3-921140-22-6.
- Franz Nieweg, Klaus Rahe, Maria Winkelmann: Gesmold Gestern und Heute. In Bildern-Berichten-Gedichten, Heimatverein Gesmold 1986.
- Andreas Loheide: Die St. Petrus Kirche Gesmold und Leitfaden Gemeindepastoral St. Petrus Gesmold, Gesmold 1993.
- Bernard Meyer: Gesmold - In alten Bildern, Heimatverein Gesmold 1995.
- Bernard Meyer: Gesmold - In alten und neuen Bildern, Heimatverein Gesmold 1997.
- Irmgard und Bernard Meyer: St. Petrus ad vincula, Gesmold 1998.
- Bernard Meyer: Gesmold - Im neuen Jahrtausend, Heimatverein Gesmold 2001.
- Ludger Stühlmeyer: Die Macht der leisen Töne oder: Ein stiller Held aus Gesmold. In: Dat Gessemske Blättken. Mit Berichten, Geschichten und Gedichten über Gesmolder Ereignisse aus Vergangenheit und Gegenwart. Heimatverein Gesmold 2010.
- Bernard Meyer: Gesmold - Im Wandel der Zeit, Heimatverein Gesmold 2010.
- Heimatverein Gesmold Bernard Meyer und Marlies Kellenbrink: Dat Gessemske Blättken, Heimatverein Gesmold 1975 - heute. Eine 16 seitige Schrift mit über 140 Ausgaben mit Themen aus Gesmold, alt und neu.
- Maria Breeck: Irrwege meiner Flucht, Heimatverein Gesmold 2013.
