= Melle, Germany =

Melle
- Town
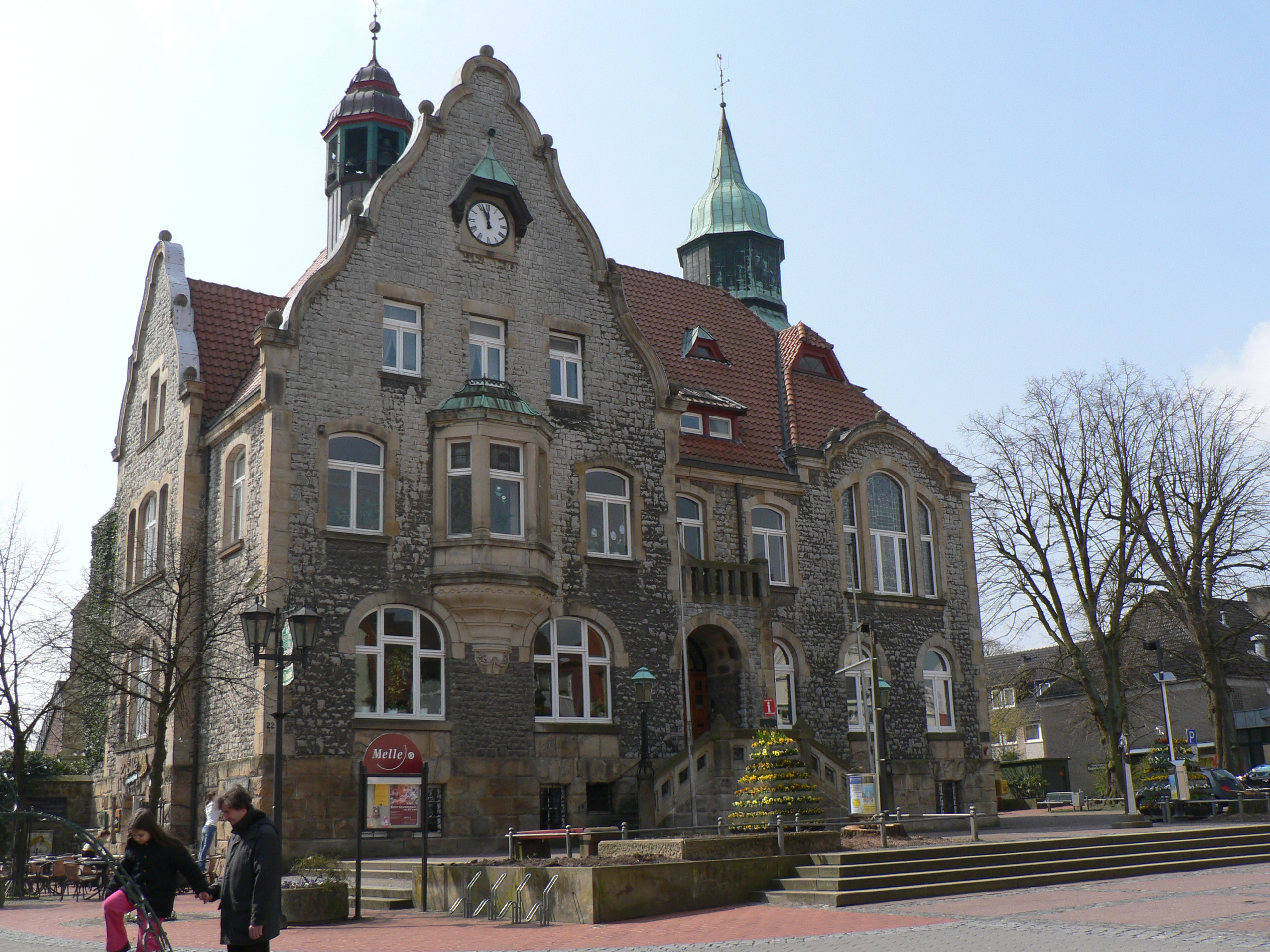
- Town hall

- Flag Coat of arms

- Location of Melle within Osnabrück district
- Interactive map of Melle
- Location within Germany Location within Lower Saxony
- Coordinates: 52°12′16″N 8°20′20″E
- Country: Germany
- State: Lower Saxony
- District: Osnabrück

Government
  - Mayor (2021–26): Jutta Dettmann (SPD)

Area
  - Total: 253.95 km^{2} (98.05 sq mi)
- Elevation: 76 m (249 ft)

Population (2025-12-31)
  - Total: 46,396
  - Density: 182.70/km^{2} (473.18/sq mi)
- Time zone: UTC+01:00 (CET)
  - Summer (DST): UTC+02:00 (CEST)
- Postal codes: 49324–49328
- Dialling codes: 05422 (Melle, Gesmold, Oldendorf); 05427 (Buer); 05428 (Neuenkirchen); 05429 (Wellingholzhausen); 05226 (Riemsloh, Bruchmühlen)
- Vehicle registration: OS, BSB, MEL, WTL
- Website: www.melle.info

Melle (German: [ˈmɛlə]) is a city in the Osnabrück district of Lower Saxony, Germany. The city corresponds to what used to be the district of Melle until regional territorial reform in 1972. Since then, Melle is the third largest city in Lower Saxony in terms of surface area.

== History ==
Melle was first mentioned in a document from 1169. In 1443 Heinrich von Moers, Bishop of Osnabrück, gave Melle the privilege of a Wigbold. Osnabrück looked after Melle's interests in the Westphalian Hanseatic League. Melle belonged to the Kingdom of Hanover until 1866 when it became part of Prussia. In 1885 Amt Grönenberg and the municipality Melle formed the Prussian district Melle. The district Melle later on became the municipality Melle. In 1972 the former district with its 56 municipalities were united to the city Melle which since then is part of Osnabrück (district).

== Geography ==
=== Geographical position ===
Melle is situated in a valley penned between the Wiehen Hills in the North and the Teutoburg Forest in the South. The cities of Osnabrück and Bielefeld are some 30 kilometres (19 miles) away each. The Münster Osnabrück Airport is located about 60 kilometres (37 miles) to the southwest.

Administrative organisation of Melle

=== Neighbouring towns ===
Neighbouring towns are Preußisch Oldendorf in the North Rhine-Westphalian Minden-Lübbecke district, Rödinghausen, Bünde and Spenge in the North Rhine-Westphalian Herford district, Werther and Borgholzhausen in the North Rhine-Westphalian Gütersloh district, as well as Dissen, Hilter, Bissendorf, and Bad Essen in the Osnabrück district.

=== Boroughs ===
The city consists of the eight boroughs of Melle-Mitte, Buer, Bruchmühlen, Gesmold, Neuenkirchen, Oldendorf, Riemsloh and Wellingholzhausen.

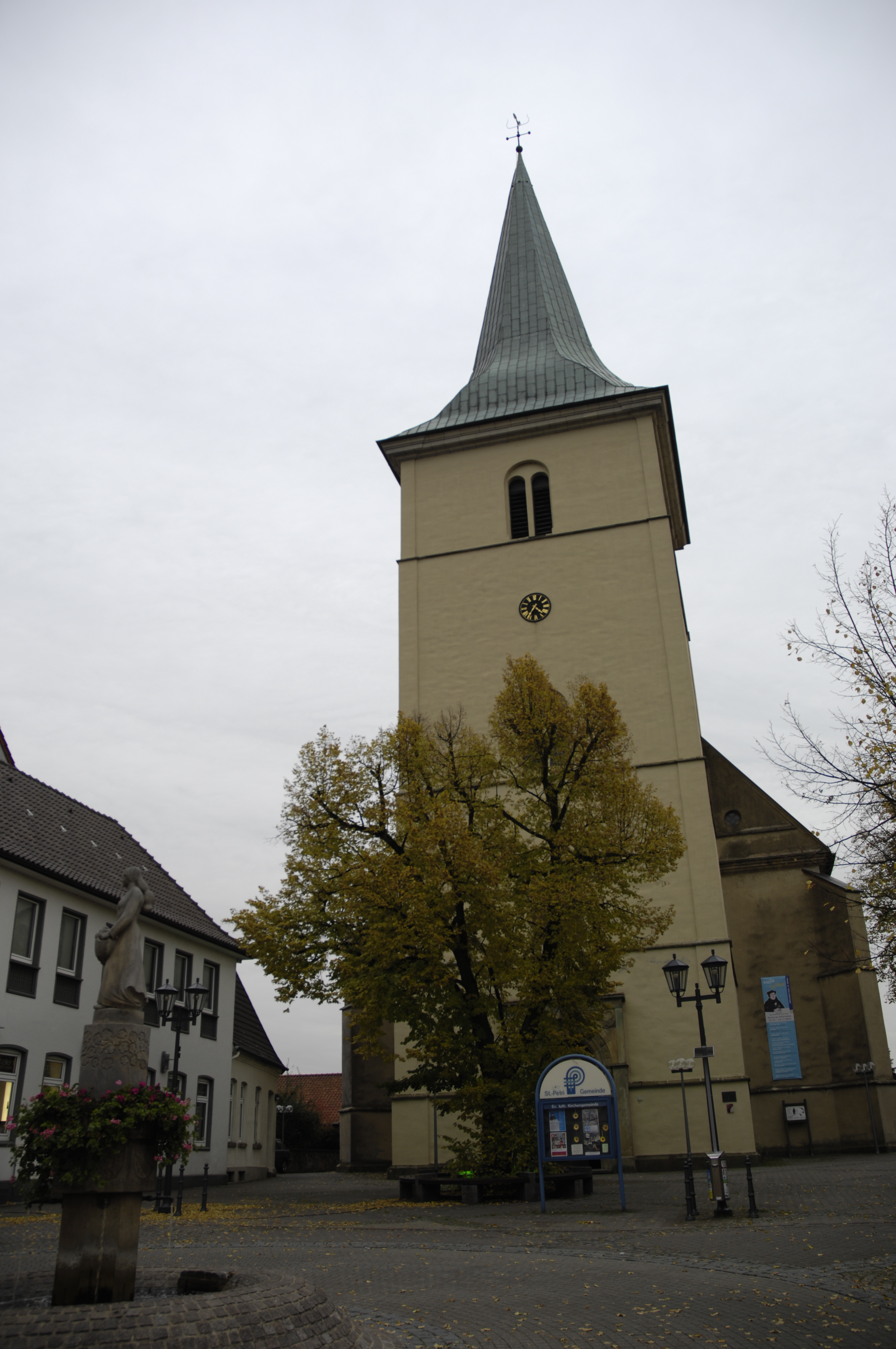
Evangelical Lutheran St. Petri Church

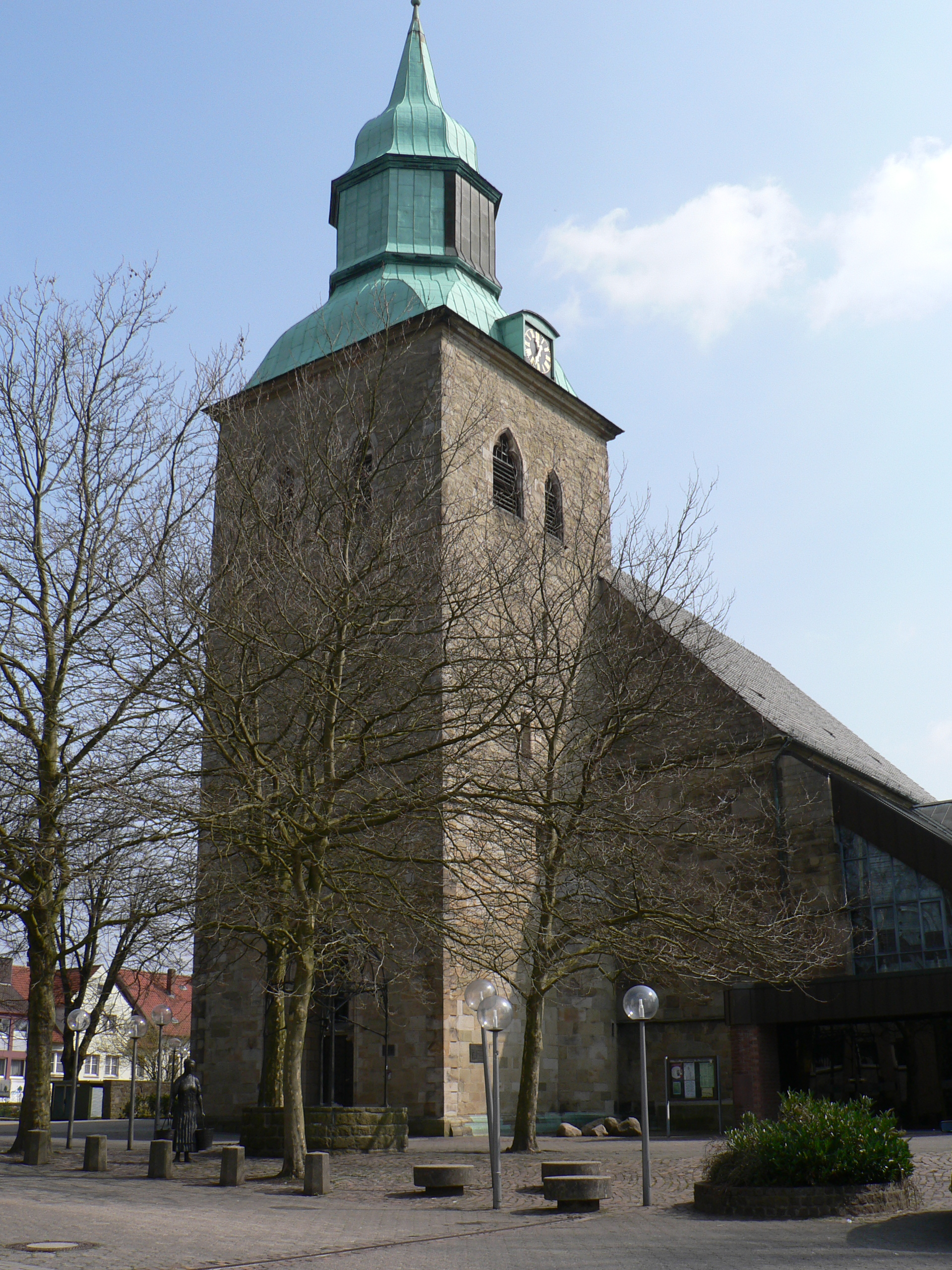
Roman Catholic St. Matthäus Church

== Religion ==
- Christian confessions:
  - Evangelical Lutheran Church: 22.579
  - Evangelical Reformed Church: 244
  - Roman Catholic Church: 15.036
  - Old Catholic Church
  - Evangelical Free Church (Baptists)
  - Russian Orthodox Church
  - Greek Orthodox Church
  - New Apostolic Church
  - The Church of Jesus Christ of Latter-day Saints (Mormon): 9
- Muslims
- Jews
- none: 10.061
- not known: 91

Last updated: 31 December 2007

== Politics ==
=== Mayor ===
Jutta Dettmann (SPD) is mayor of Melle, elected in 2021.

=== City council ===
The city council is composed of 40 members. Additionally the city mayor is eligible to vote.

	CDU	SPD	The Greens	FDP	Total
2011	16	15	7	2	40 seats

(As of: Local elections on 11 September 2011)

=== Further election results ===
	CDU	SPD	The Greens	FDP	The Left	Others	Election turnout
State election 2013	38.8%	30.8%	13.7%	10.6%	2.2%	4.0%	61.4%
Federal election 2013	44.3%	30.5%	9.7%	4.8%	4.0%	6.8%	77.5%
European parliament election 2014	43.3%	31.0%	11.1%	3.0%	3.2%	8.3%	60.1%

(Source: Official election results of the County of Osnabrück)

== Twin towns – sister cities ==
Melle is twinned with:

- Bad Dürrenberg, Germany
- Cires-lès-Mello, France
- Eecke, France
- Eiken, Switzerland
- Eke (Nazareth), Belgium
- Ghent, Belgium
- Jēkabpils, Latvia
- Melle, Belgium
- Melle, France
- Niğde, Turkey
- Reinickendorf (Berlin), Germany
- Torzhok, Russia

Melle also has friendly relations with New Melle, Missouri, United States.

== Economy ==
A substantial economic factor for Melle is the wood processing industry. Further important branches are metal, food, and plastics processing. Tetra (company) was founded in Melle. In recent years Melle has more and more become a logistics site along the A 30 motorway.

== Culture and sights ==
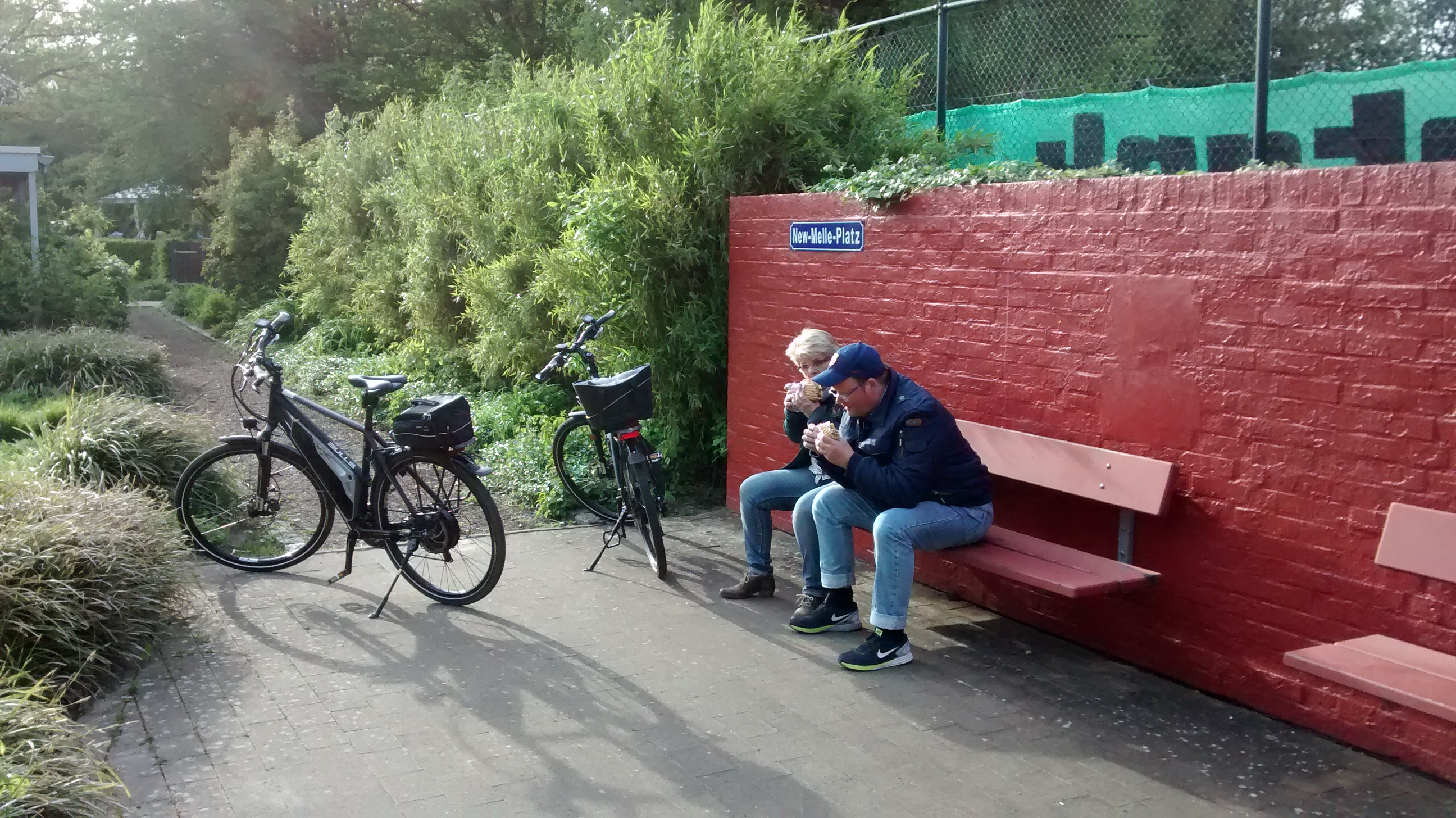
New-Melle – Meeting point

There are two astronomical observatories in the surrounding of Melle providing guided tours for the public. The EXPO 2000 observatory in Melle-Oberholsten runs the largest Newtonian telescope used for public observation.

== Notable people ==
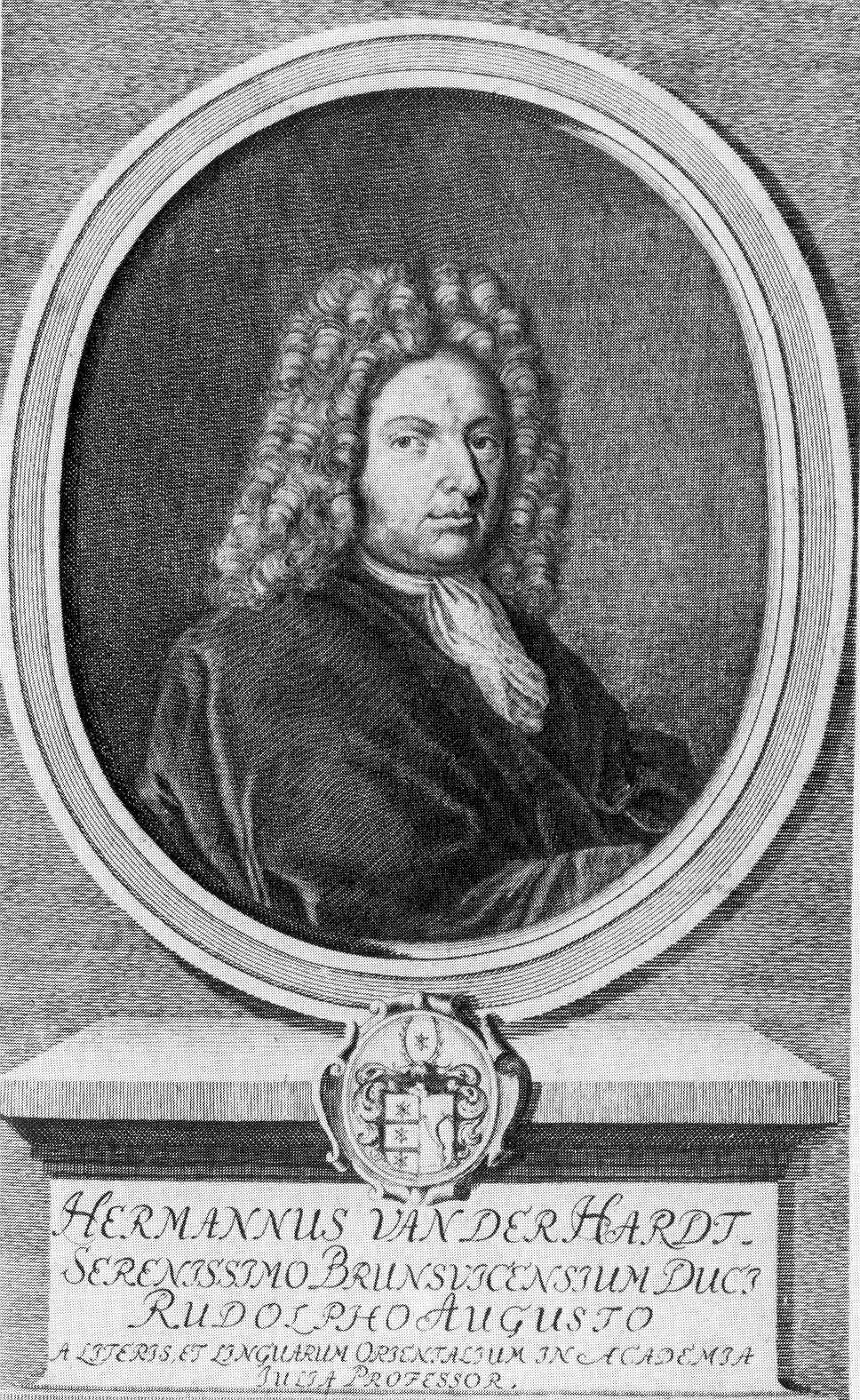
Hermann von der Hardt

- Hermann von der Hardt (1660 – 1746), German historian and orientalist.
- Gerhard Kohnert (1882–1962), entrepreneur, furniture manufacturer and local politician; died locally.
- Hermann Meyer-Rabingen (1887 – 1961), German general in the Wehrmacht during World War II
- Ludwig Bäumer (1888–1928), writer and Communist activist.
- Ilse Losa (1913—2006), Portuguese writer and translator of German-Jewish origin, born at Buer in Melle
- Axel Bulthaupt (born 1966), journalist and television presenter
- Jörg Bode (born 1969), football coach and a former player who played over 450 games
- Perry Leenhouts (born 1972), Dutch-American musician and producer
- Mehmet Yozgatlı (born 1979), a Turkish former footballer who played over 230 games
