= Meller Möbelfabrik =

German manufacturer of home and office furniture

Coordinates: 52°12′27″N 8°20′27″E

Meller Möbelfabrik, Melle (MMM)
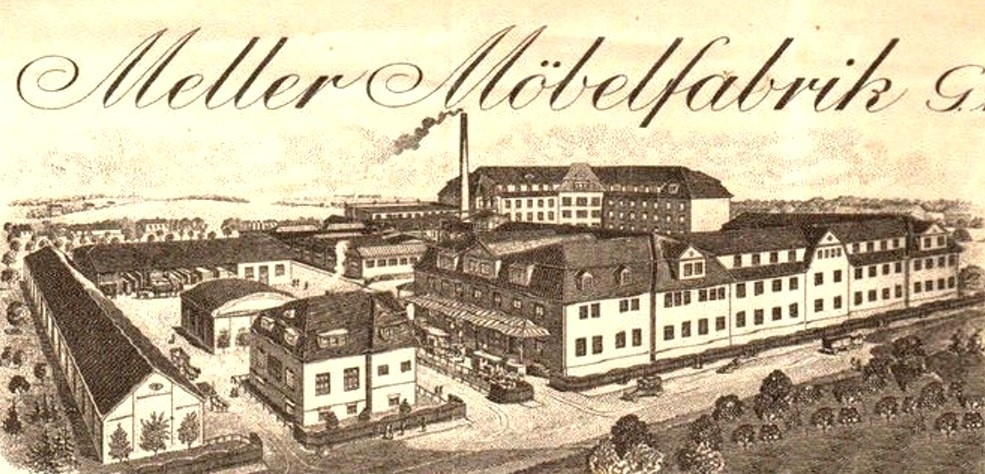
- Type: GmbH (Gesellschaft mit beschränkter Haftung)
- Industry: Furniture company
- Founded: 1909
- Founder: Gerhard Kohnert & Hans Kohnert
- Fate: company liquidated due to insolvency
- Headquarters: Melle, Germany, Lower Saxony, Germany
- Key people: Hans Kohnert, Gerhard Kohnert
- Production output: high-quality home and office furniture
- Number of employees: 120 - 200
- Subsidiaries: Meller Möbelfabrik, Melle (MMM)
- Footnotes; Corresponding article in the German Wikipedia

The Meller Möbelfabrik GmbH, Melle (MMM) was a manufacturer of high-quality home and office furniture in Melle, Germany founded in 1870 as J.H. Krumnack, Möbelfabrik, Dampfsägewerk und Holzhandlung and liquidated in 1975 after a chequered history. With up to 200 employees at times, the owner-managed, medium-sized company was an important part of the Ostwestfalen-Lippe furniture industry. Some of the buildings are now listed and well preserved.

== History ==
=== 1870-1908 Prehistory ===
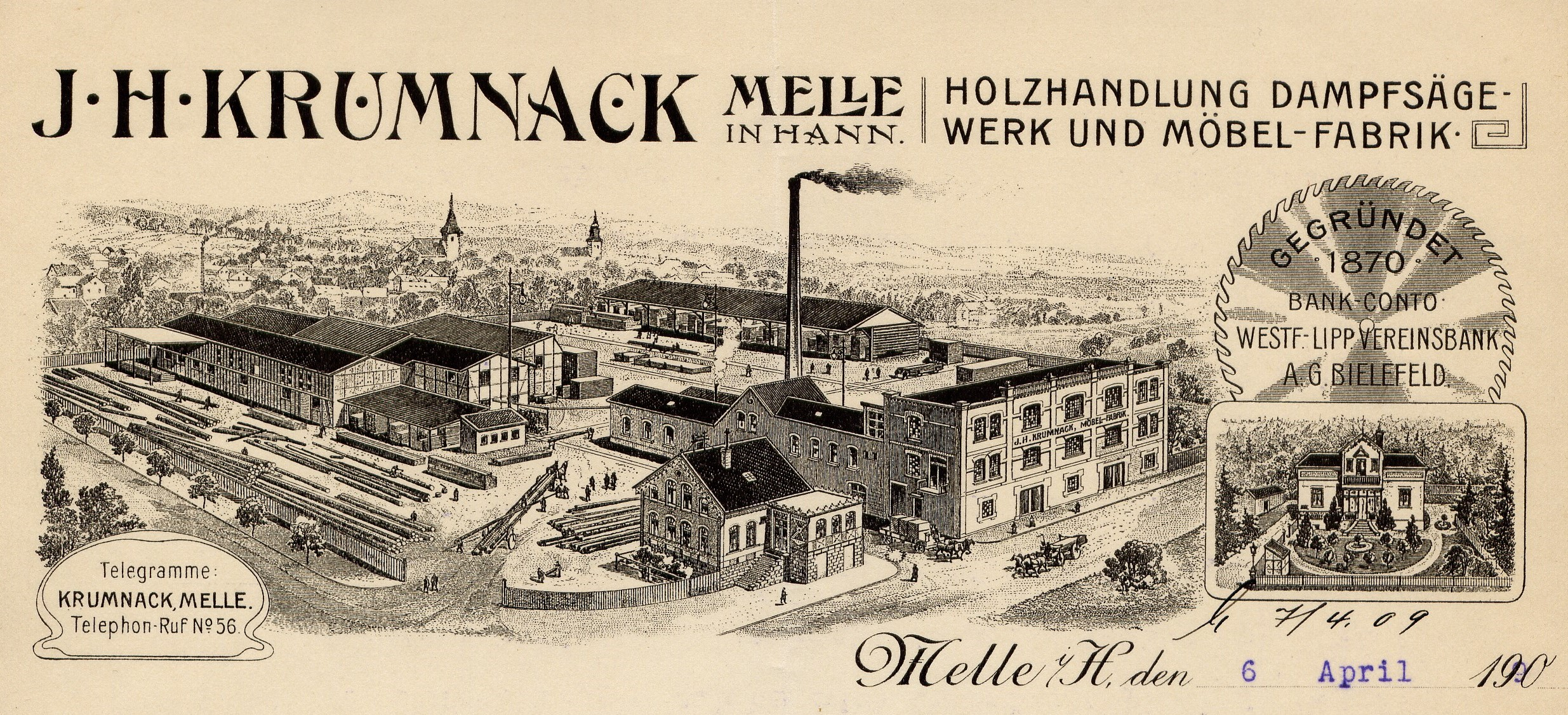
letterhead 1909

In 1870, the company J.H. Krumnack, Möbelfabrik, sawmill und Holzhandlung was founded in Melle. A land lot near the railway station with access via “Oldendorfer Straße” was chosen as the location in order to become active nationwide. The first expansion took place in 1904 with the construction of a new three-storey factory building in classical industrial architecture, which still exists today, as well as an office and residential building. A new machine hall followed a few years later.

In 1908, after the recent investments, the Krumnack company ran into financial difficulties due to declining sales, which led to the opening of Insolvency on 6 April 1909. An important supplier up to this point was the timber import company Pundt & Kohn in Geestemünde (today Bremerhaven). Pundt & Kohn was a major creditor of Krumnack through trade credit. For this reason and also due to family interests, the Melle company was taken over by Pundt & Kohn on 27 September 1909 as part of the Liquidation.

=== 1909-1932 Meller Möbelfabrik GmbH ===
Franz Kohn, owner of the company Pundt & Kohn, had two sons, of whom Hans Kohn continued the timber business in Geestemünde and Gerhard Kohn took over the management of the newly acquired factory in Melle, which was entered in the commercial register in 1909 as Meller Möbelfabrik GmbH with the main business of furniture manufacture. The sole owner was the offene Handelsgesellschaft Pundt & Kohn in Geestemünde, in which Gerhard Kohn remained personally liable and authorised signatory partner.

The few years before First World War were used to expand furniture production. With the outbreak of the war, however, production was then largely switched to war-important products. Nevertheless, investments were also made during the war. The steam boiler had to be renewed to meet the increased heating requirements of the factory rooms and for the necessary process heat. A new 40 m high clinker chimney and a new power station with a chip bunker were built between 1916 and 1918. The factory chimney, a status symbol at the time, was the tallest in Melle at 40 metres.

At the beginning of the Weimar Republic and with the economic upswing in the 1930s, the expansion progressed rapidly. Despite inflation, new buildings for furniture production were started as early as 1921. With the construction of a new office and the gatehouse in 1924, the business address and the main access road were moved to “Teichbruchstraße” (from 1953 again “Bismarckstraße”). A copper bonnet with a tower clock from the Turmuhrfabrik Ed. Korfhage & Söhne in Melle/Buer, who also supplied the carillon for the Melle town hall, was mounted on the gatehouse.

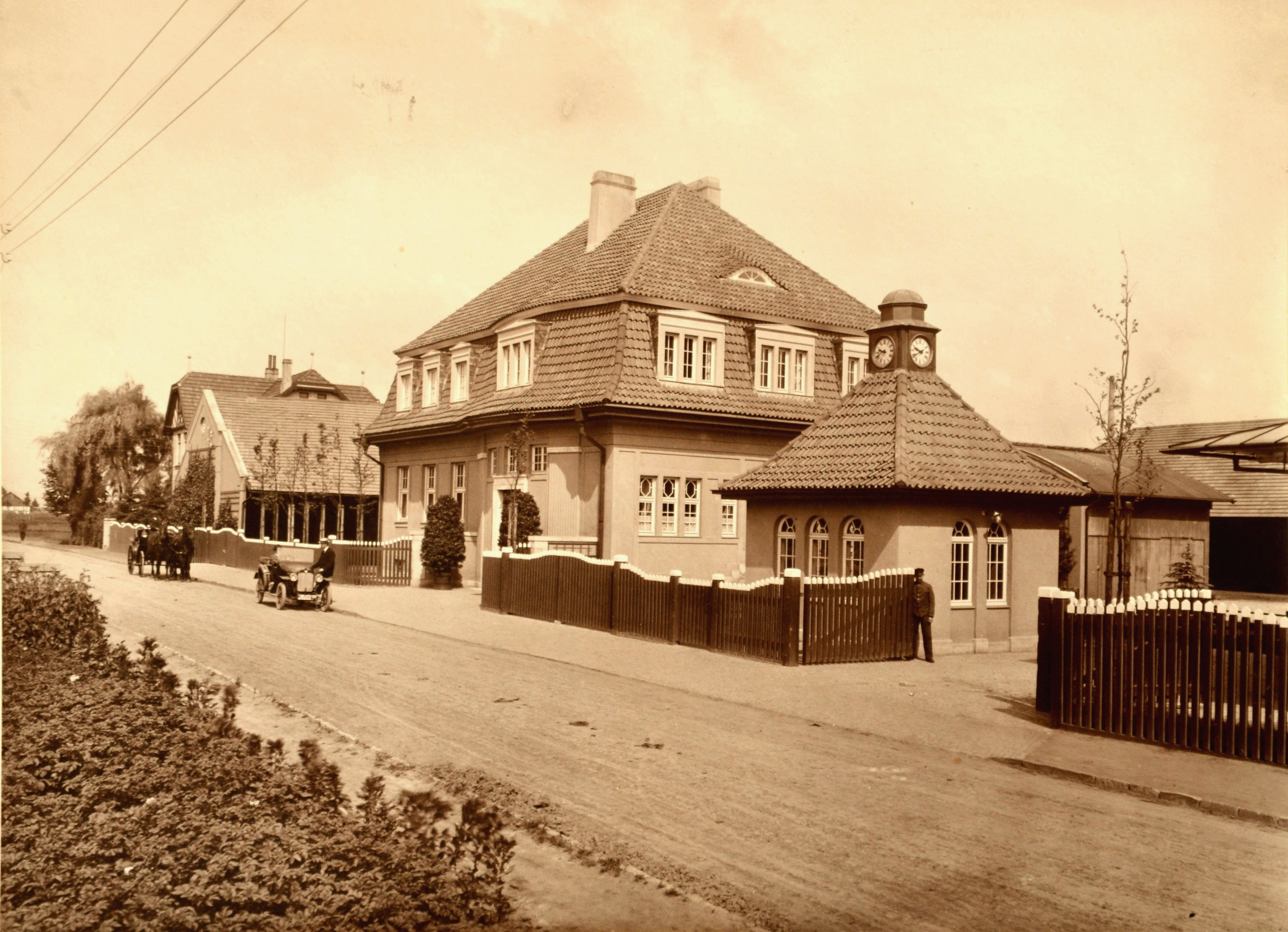
Office and gatehouse

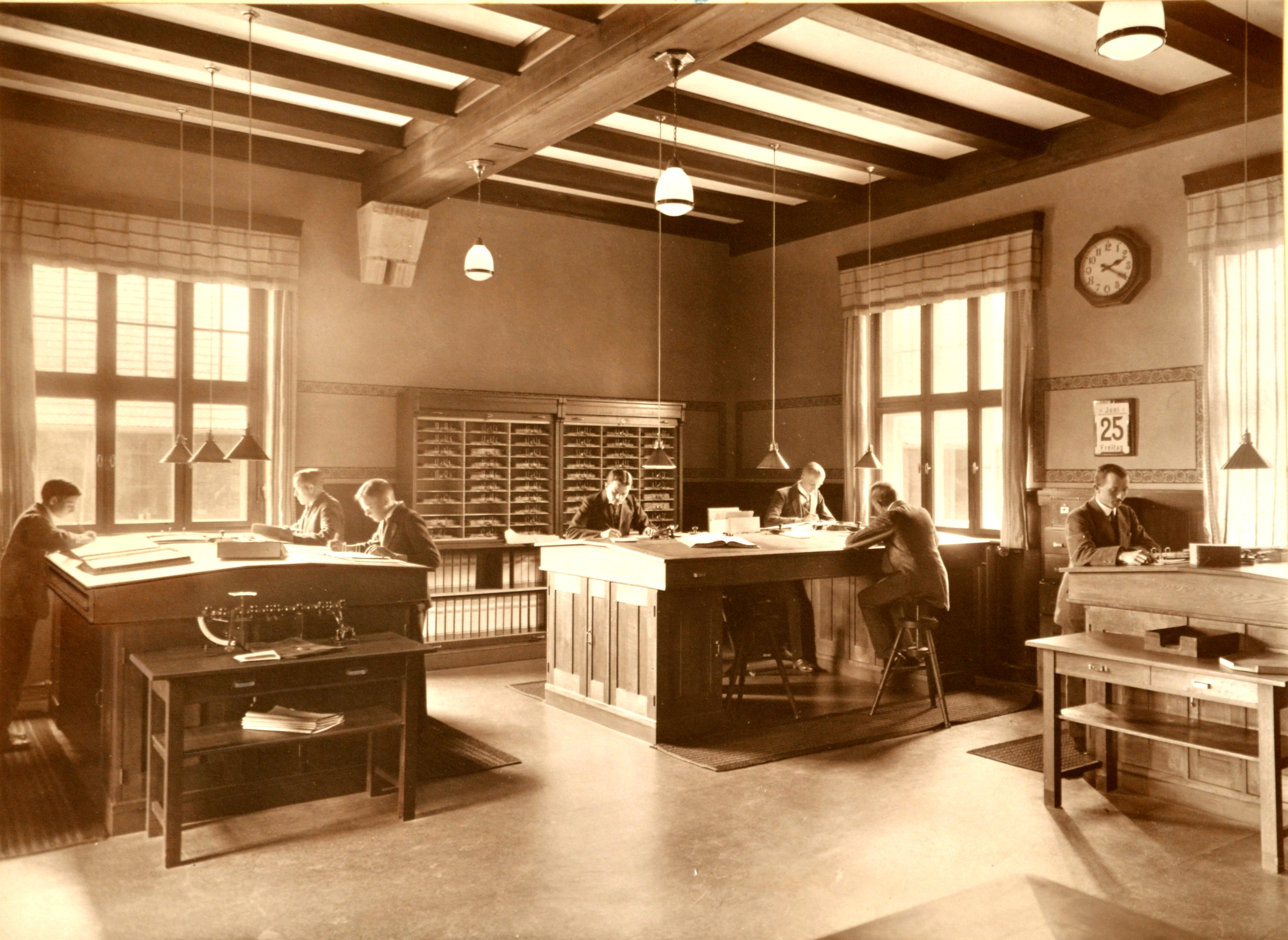
Accountant's office 1926

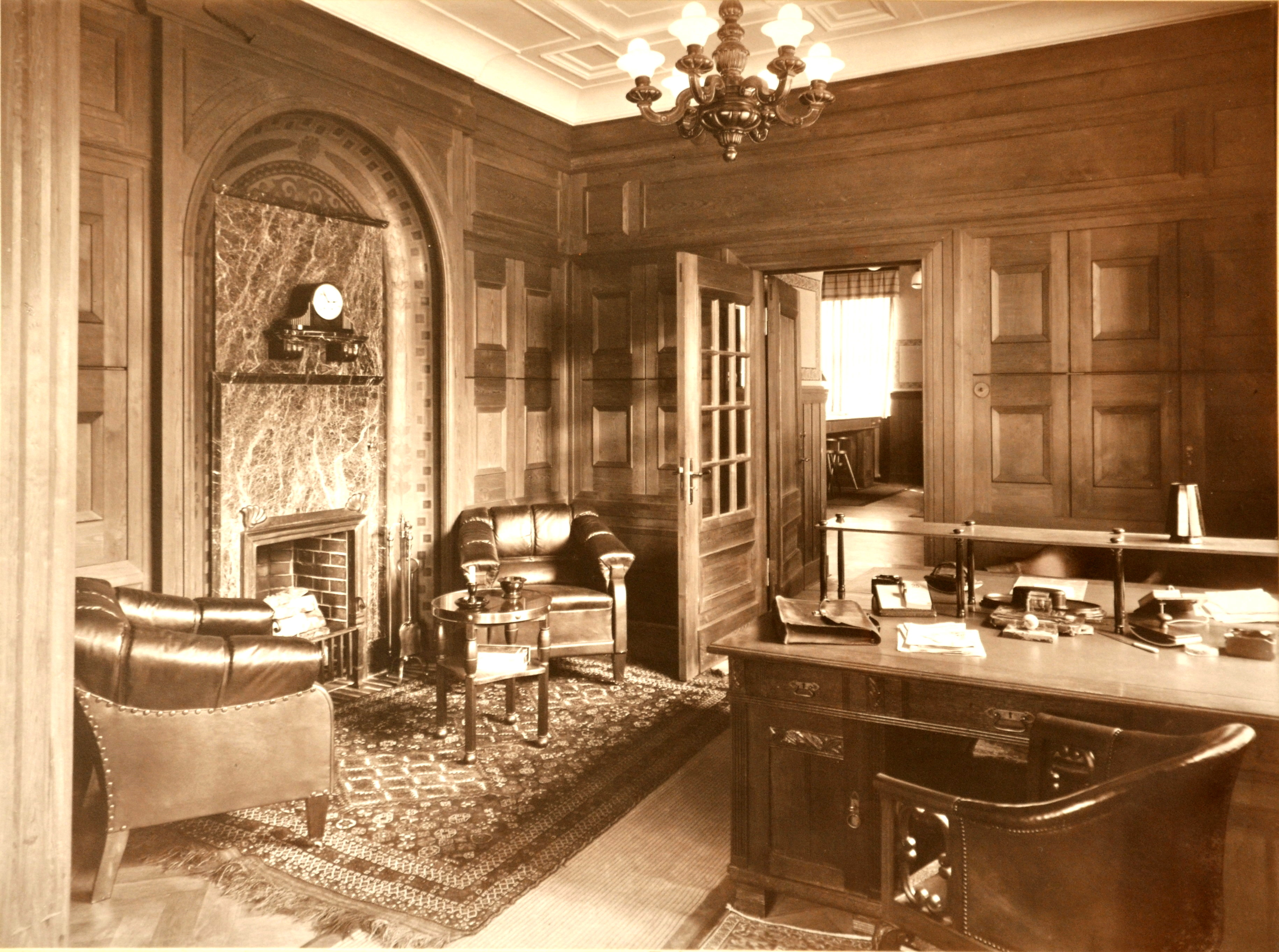
Private office and reception room

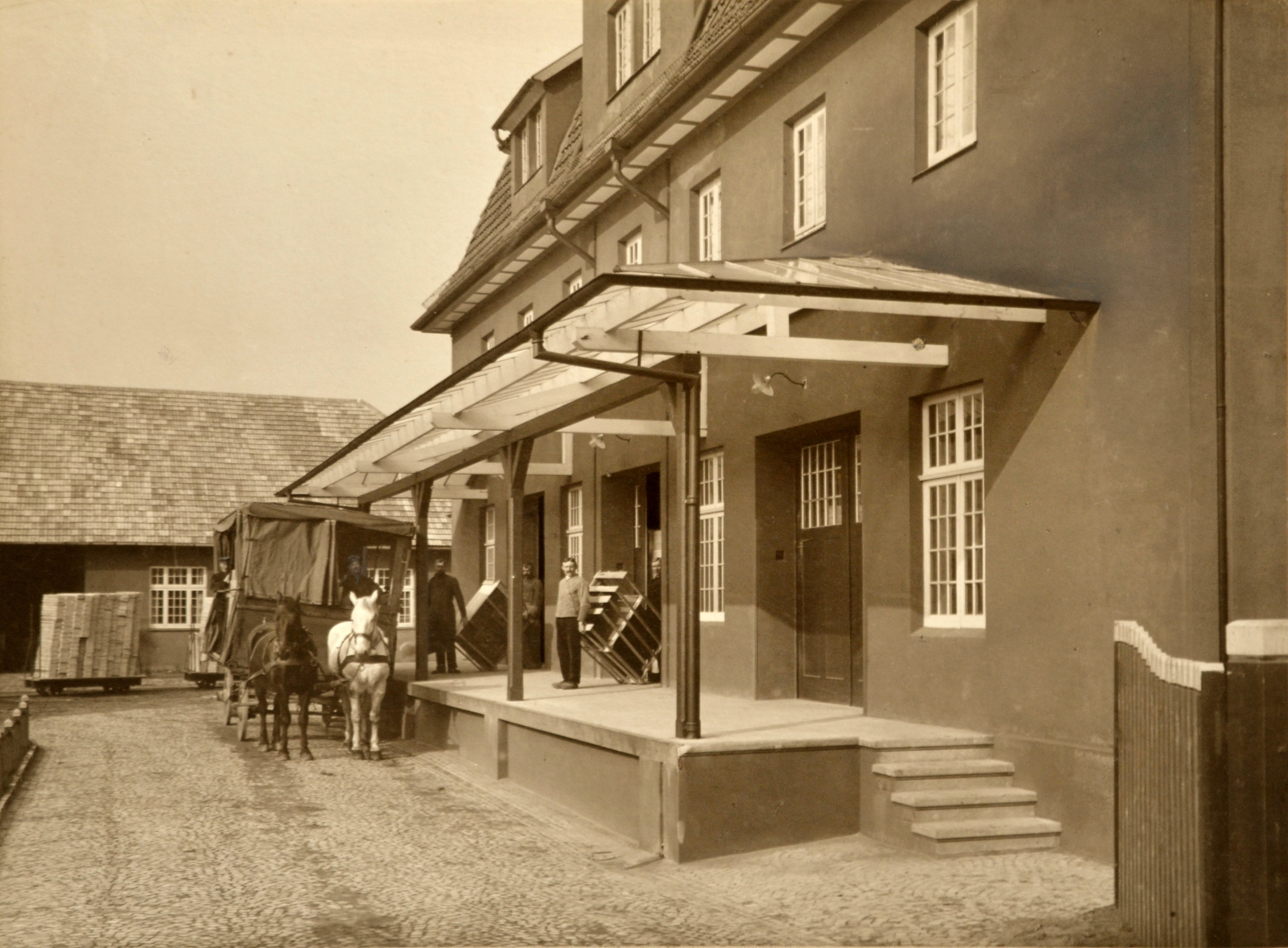
Loading ramp

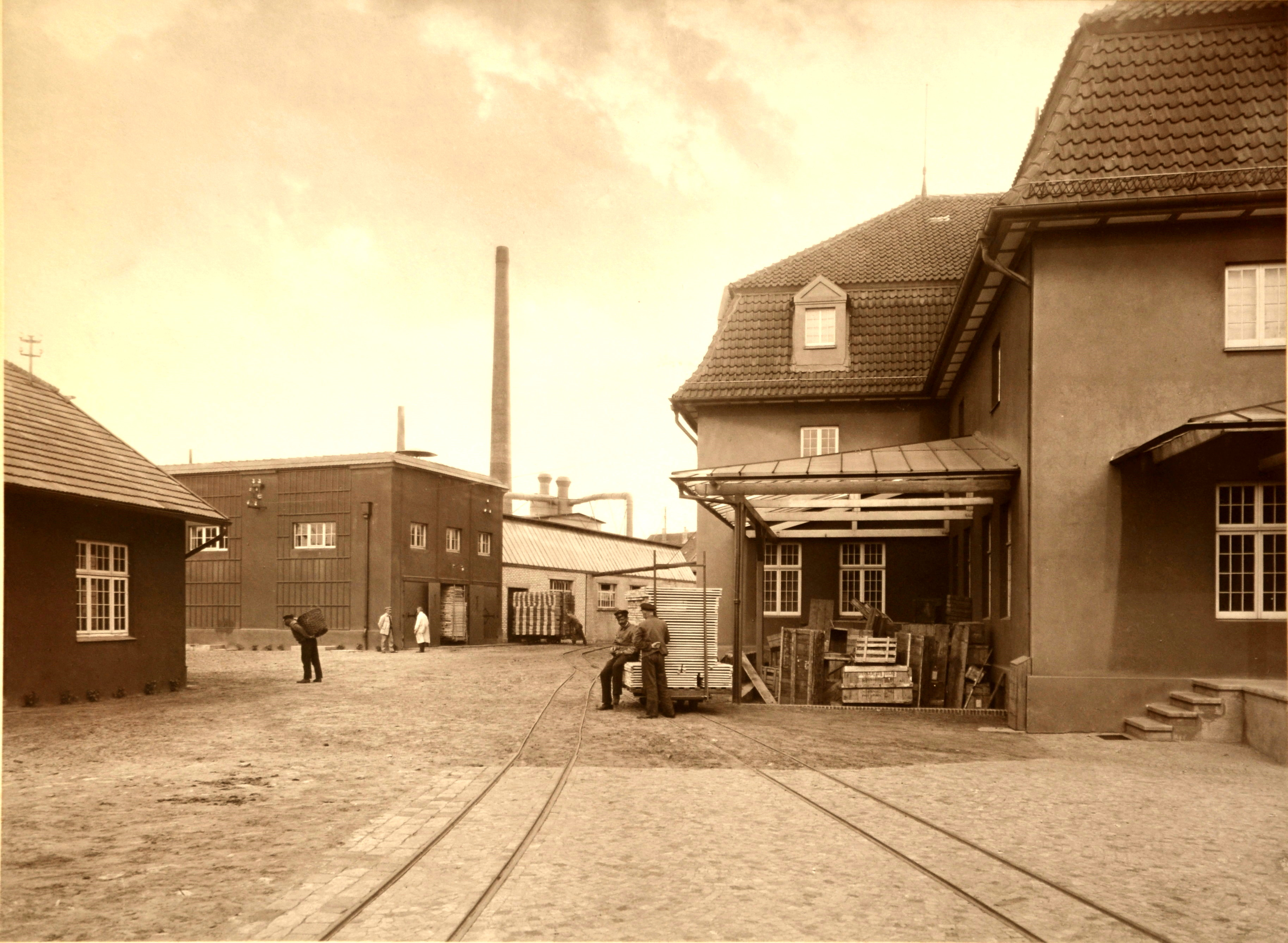
Factory yard

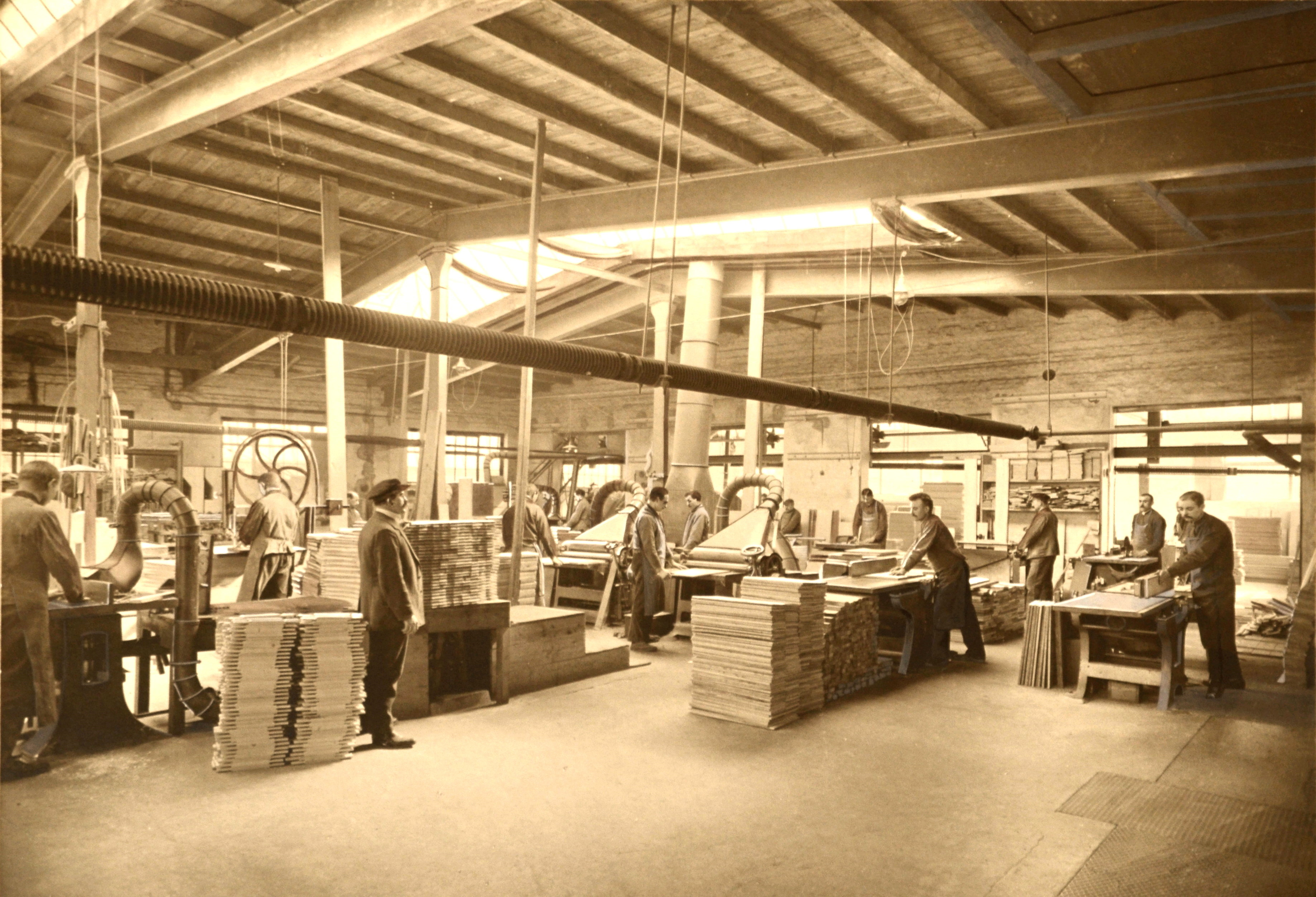
Machine hall

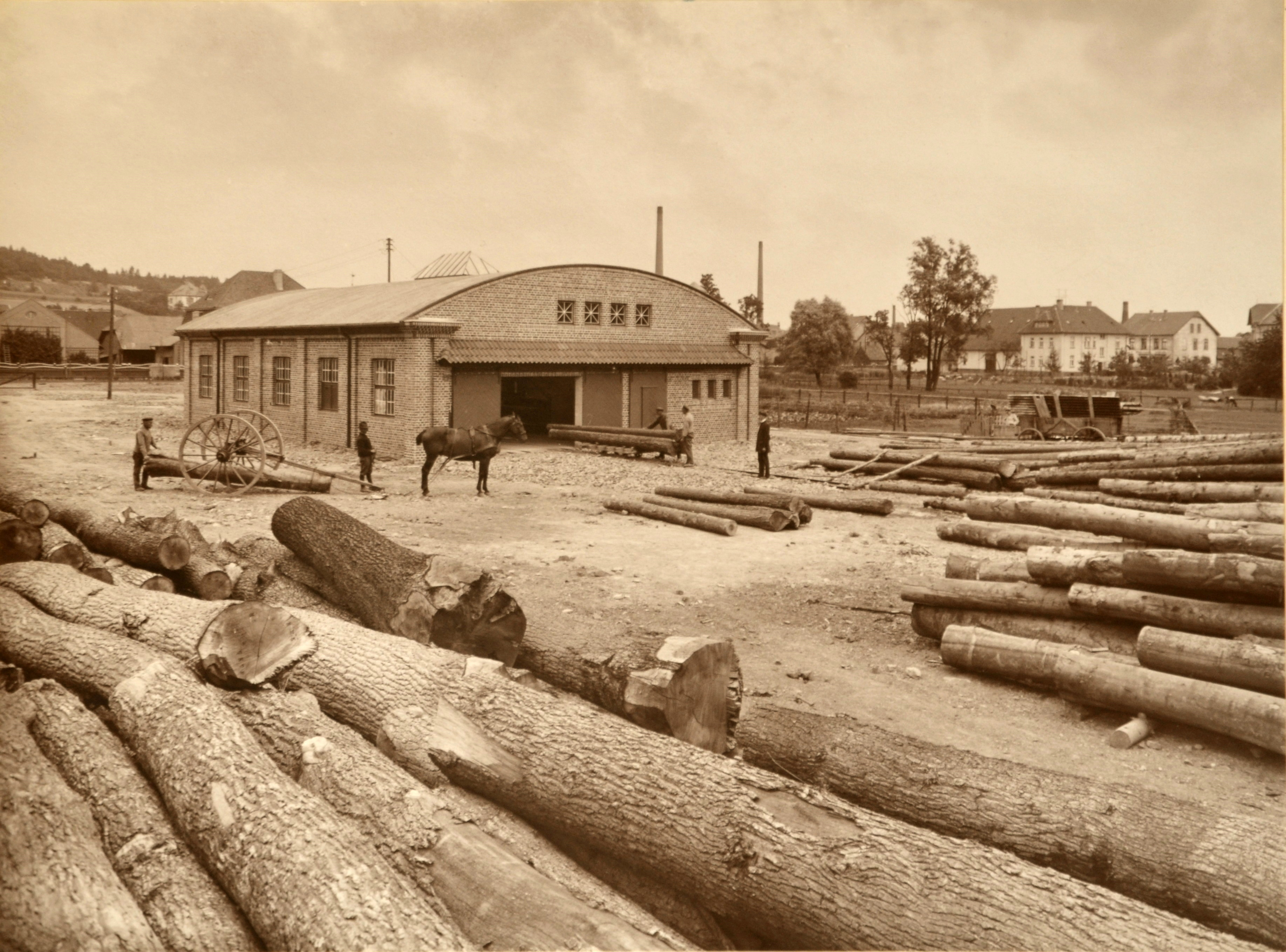
Sawmill with log yard

In 1925, the company premises were extended for the construction of a new sawmill on the opposite side of Teichbruchstraße. This sawmill was equipped with an electrically driven horizontal gang saw, a large cutting circular saw and a saw sharpening shop. Here, roundwood from the surrounding forests were cut for the company's own needs. The most important types of wood were beech, oak, pine and spruce. A short time later, the sawmill was supplemented by a woodshed of approx. 2500 m^{2} for the air-drying of the sawn timber. The sawmill, the timber shed and the furniture factory were connected by a narrow gauge rail system with switches, transverse sliding cars and turntables on which the loaded goods lorry carss were pushed or pulled by horses.

In 1927, "Haus Sonneck" was built on the Meller Berg. The spacious villa with a view over the town of Melle was heated with open fireplaces and tiled stoves. An electromagnetic call system was installed for the staff, with which numbers in the kitchen indicated in which room the master of the house or his guests wanted service. The greenhouses, built into the hillside below the villa, were connected to the cellar of the house by an underground passage.

=== 1933-1945 The company under National Socialism ===
The National Socialists were anxious to increase the productivity of industry. In the course of KdF measures, recreation areas were to be set up for the employees during work breaks in order to strengthen their willingness to perform for "Führer, Volk und Vaterland". At MMM, social rooms were built for this purpose and chestnut trees were planted in the open space at the corner of Oldendorfer Straße and Bahnhofstraße, green areas were laid out and wooden benches were set up for resting. In 1939, the Melle furniture factory as well as the competing furniture factory Gebrüder Kruse were awarded the certificate of a "Nationalsozialistischer Musterbetrieb (model plant)".

In 1937, the family name as well as the company name Kohn was changed to Kohnert at the request of Hans Kohn and ministerially approved on 14 August 1937. The reason was the hostility because of the Jewish-sounding surname Kohn/Cohn in the context of the National Socialist Aryanisation.

The conversion to war-important products was already known from the First World War. Thus, in Second World War, MMM's production was also converted to war-important production. In addition to the production of ammunition boxes, aircraft were also repaired and built in the furniture factory (no further information is available on this). The leading personnel, as far as they were not in front-line service, were specially retrained for this task. Staff shortages due to the drafts were compensated for by the use of female workers. Later, forced labourers were also assigned to the company. These women and men were quartered on the upper floors of the furniture factory. Under the shipping department and under the drying chambers there were cellars which were converted into air-raid shelterss by installing steel doors.

In 1940, the Support organization Meller Möbelfabrik GmbH e.V. was entered as an association in the commercial register. The purpose is unknown.

=== 1946-1961 Economic miracle period ===
After the end of the war, the company management was able to achieve an economic upswing very quickly. This was favoured by the fact that there was no war damage to the factory and of course there was a great demand for furniture. The rapid establishment of a new, comprehensive distribution network for the emerging Federal Republic ensured good sales with a loyal clientele. As an exhibitor at the Cologne Furniture Fair, which took place every 2 years, so many sales orders were written there that production was always busy for at least 6 months afterwards.

Immediately after the end of the war, the villa "Haus Sonneck" was confiscated by the British occupation forces. Gerhard Kohnert therefore had to move temporarily into the MMM office building. Due to this emergency, the construction of new living space began as quickly as possible. As a result, the construction of the factory housing complex in “Bismarckstraße” with its 3 clinker brick houses and large gardens was completed as early as 1949. The middle house, no. 15, was occupied by Gerhard Kohnert and house no. 13 by the plant manager and authorised signatory. For family reasons, house no. 17 was not to be occupied, but was nevertheless completed as a construction shell in order not to disturb the symmetry of the housing estate. It was not until 13 years later, after the death of Gerhard Kohnert, that the interior work was completed and the house was used as company housing.

Right at the beginning of the occupation period, “Haus Sonneck” was modernised by the British through the installation of a central coke heating system and the removed tile stoves were temporarily stored in the MMM. The villa was only released after the Occupation Statutes were lifted by the Paris Agreements on 5 May 1955. However, the house and garden had suffered greatly during the last few years, so that extensive renovation work was necessary before the family of Gerhard Kohnert's nephew, Franz Kohnert and his family could move in. In 1962, the villa was sold for liquidity reasons.

The factory facilities were steadily but not comprehensively modernised in the 1950s. The last new building was the extension of the engine house in 1956 to provide more space for wood core plywood production. In that year, a profit transfer agreement was also concluded, which obliged the GmbH to transfer all profits to the parent company in Bremerhaven, which had been weakened by the destruction of the war. Thus, the GmbH was financially depleted in the following years and a considerable pent-up investment developed.

In 1953, Gerhard Kohnert was awarded the Order of Merit of the Federal Republic of Germany for his services to the development of the local furniture industry.

=== 1962-1975 New management ===
On 5 July 1962, Gerhard Kohnert died, after 53 years of running the company as General Manager. At its peak, the company had 200 employees and was a significant part of the East Westphalia Furniture industry. His brother Hans Kohnert from Bremerhaven then took over the management of the company. However, he could not stop the economic decline. At the insistence of the house banks, Hans Kohnert sold the Meller Möbelfabrik to the main creditors in 1967 in order to avoid bankruptcy. The new managing partners, Hans Wilhelm Rottmann (co-owner of the Rottmann chipboard factory in Herford) and Heinrich Fortmann (previously authorised signatory and operations manager at MMM), initially succeeded in bringing about an economic upswing at MMM. However, in the long run the disadvantages of the outdated factory buildings (three-storey and winding) could not be compensated for even by various rationalisation measures. The capital was not sufficient to reduce the large investment backlog. New competitors also made it increasingly difficult to hold one's own in the market and to achieve the necessary prices.

Due to rising costs and economic stagnation sales, liquidity problems became increasingly apparent as early as 1974, which then led to insolvency and bankruptcy filing in 1975. Production was discontinued and the company liquidated.

== Buildings ==
The buildings that are still preserved from the Melle furniture factory show themselves today in a very well-kept condition. Some are listed. The original gatehouse was unfortunately demolished around 1980.

- The three-storey factory building on Oldendorfer Straße. Built in 1904 in the Neo-Renaissance style.
- The factory building on Bismarckstraße, used for various offices and surgeries. Built 1923-1927
- The office building in Bismarckstraße. Built in 1924 in the style of reform architecture, now used as the Kingdom Hall of Jehovah's Witnesses
- Villa "Haus Sonneck" built in 1927 in the style of reform architecture, today much altered by alterations and additions.
- The street front of the former wooden shed with the archways. Built ca. 1927 in the style of Neoclassicism
- The three clinker brick houses of the listed factory housing estate in “Bismarckstraße”, today nos. 23, 25 and 27. Built in 1949.
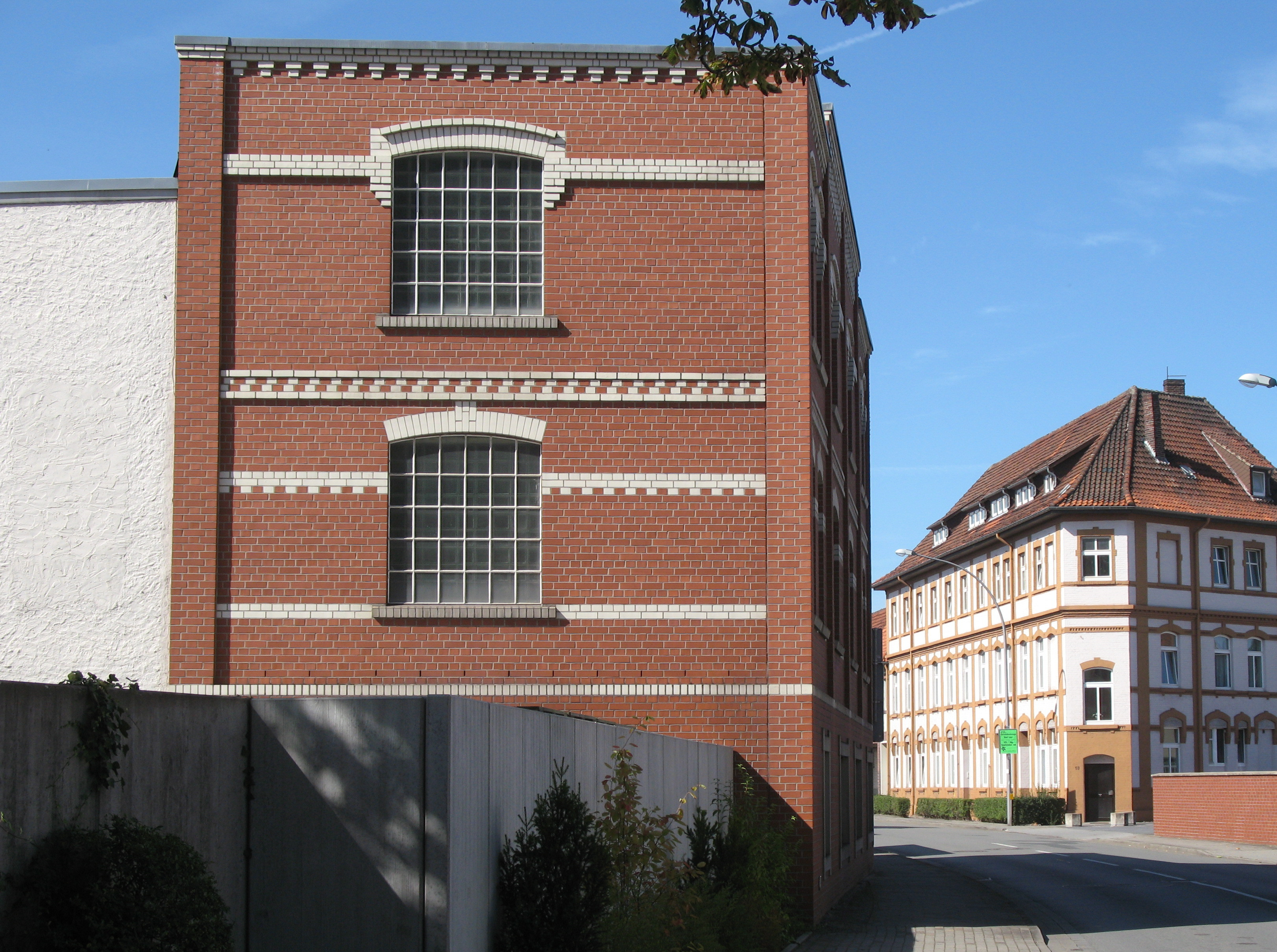
Building on “Oldendorfer Strasse”, 2008

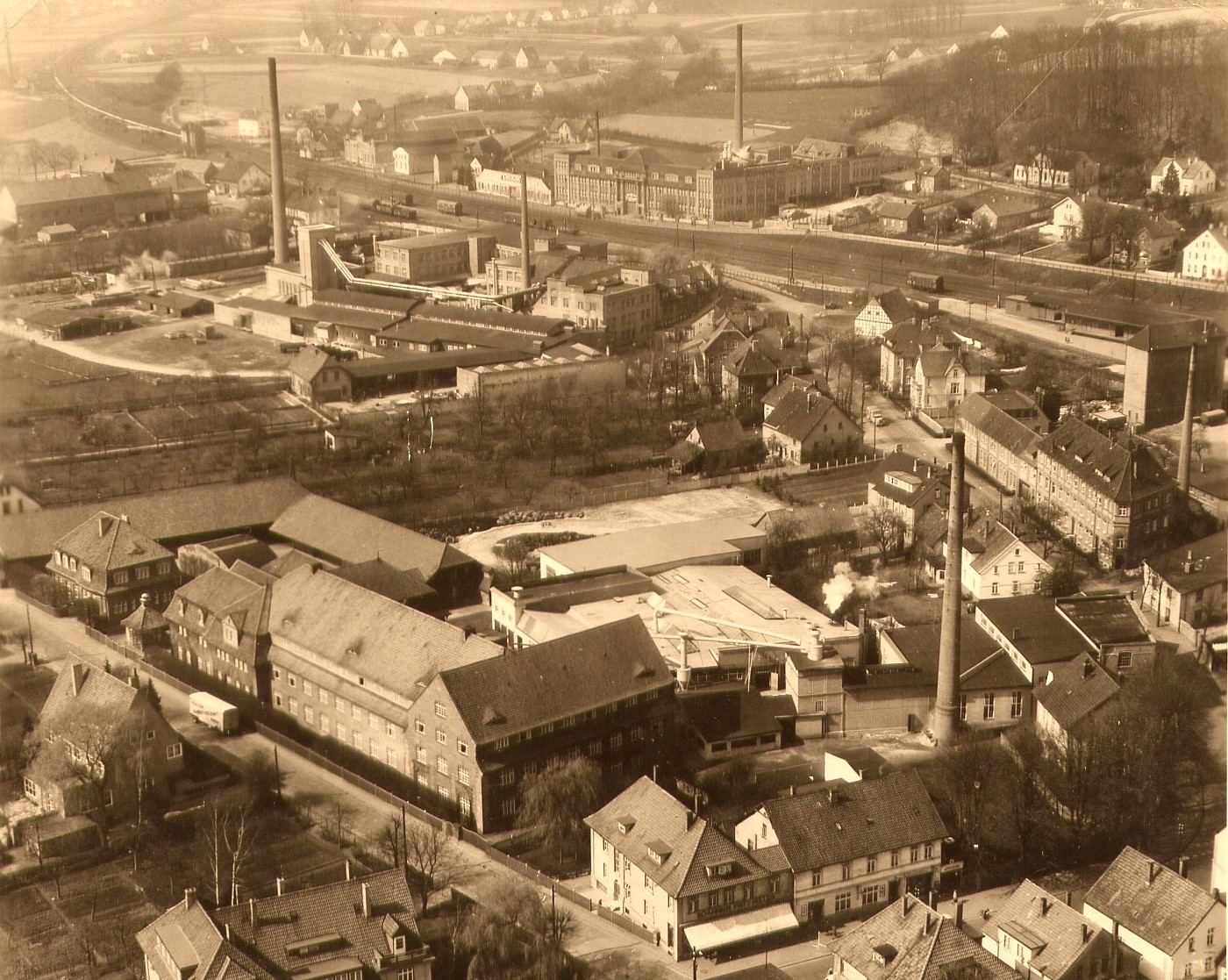
Meller furniture factory (front), Gebr. Kruse (middle), W.Melchersmann (behind the railway embankment) 1956

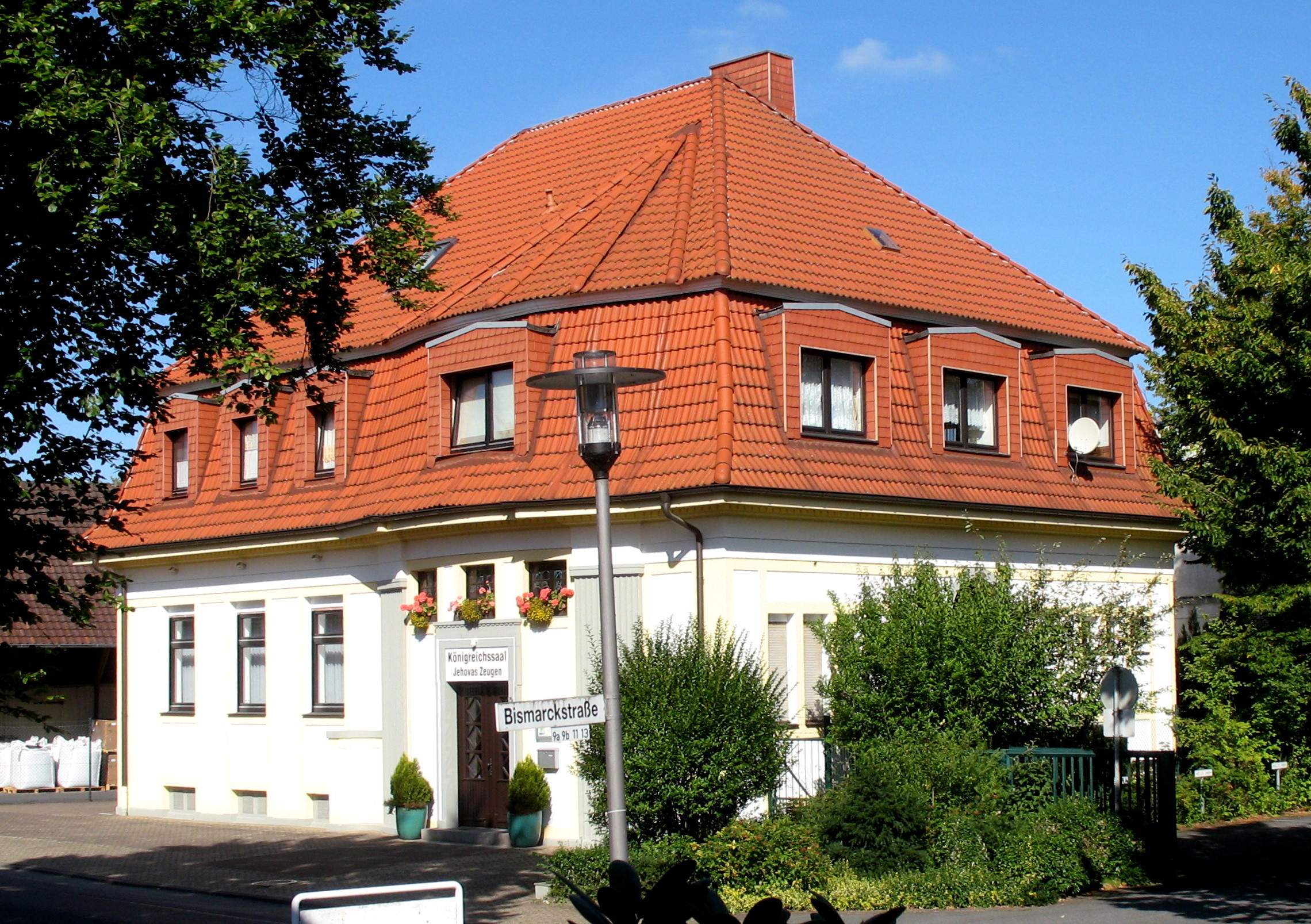
Office building 2008

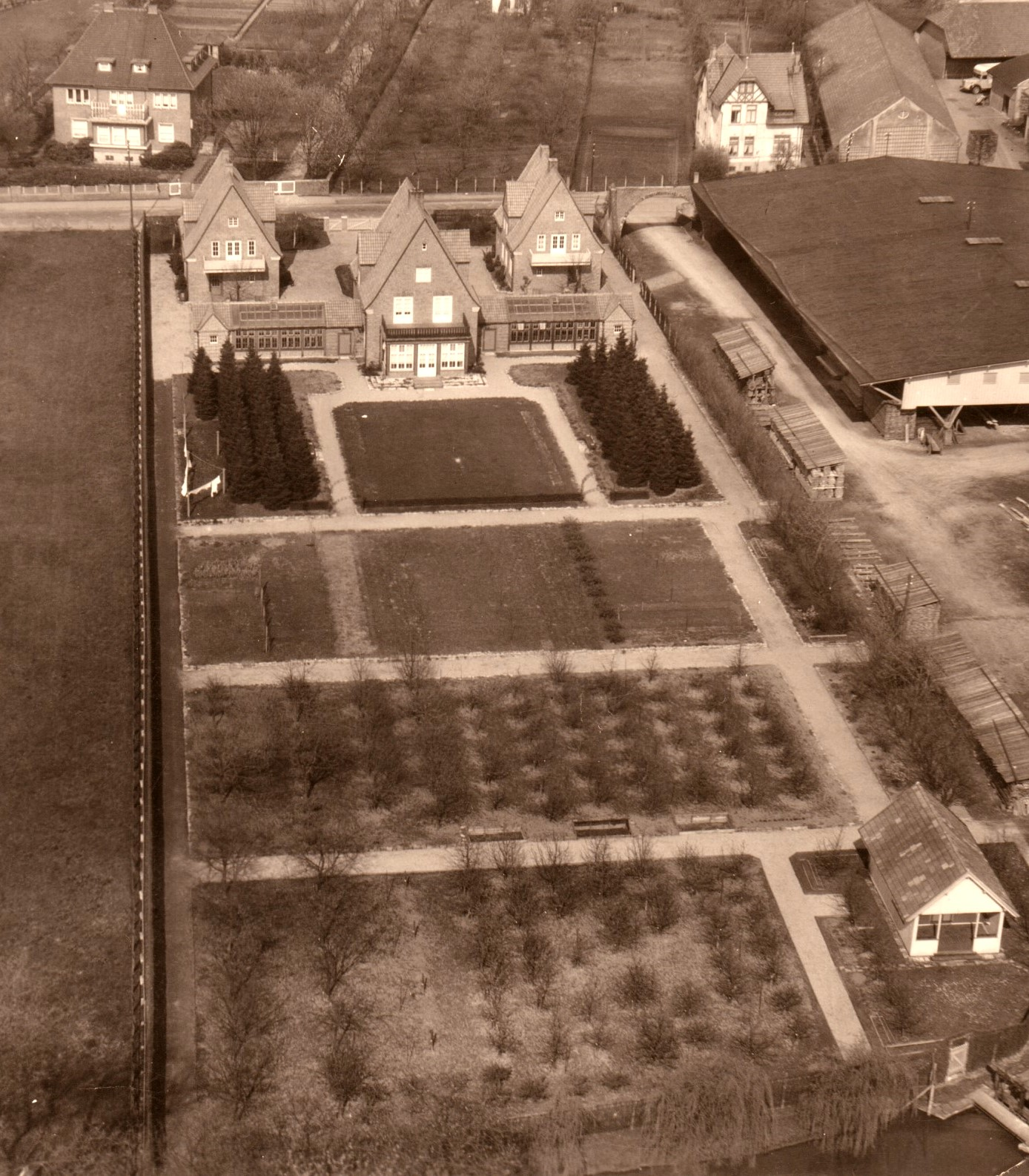
Factory estate with gardens 1956

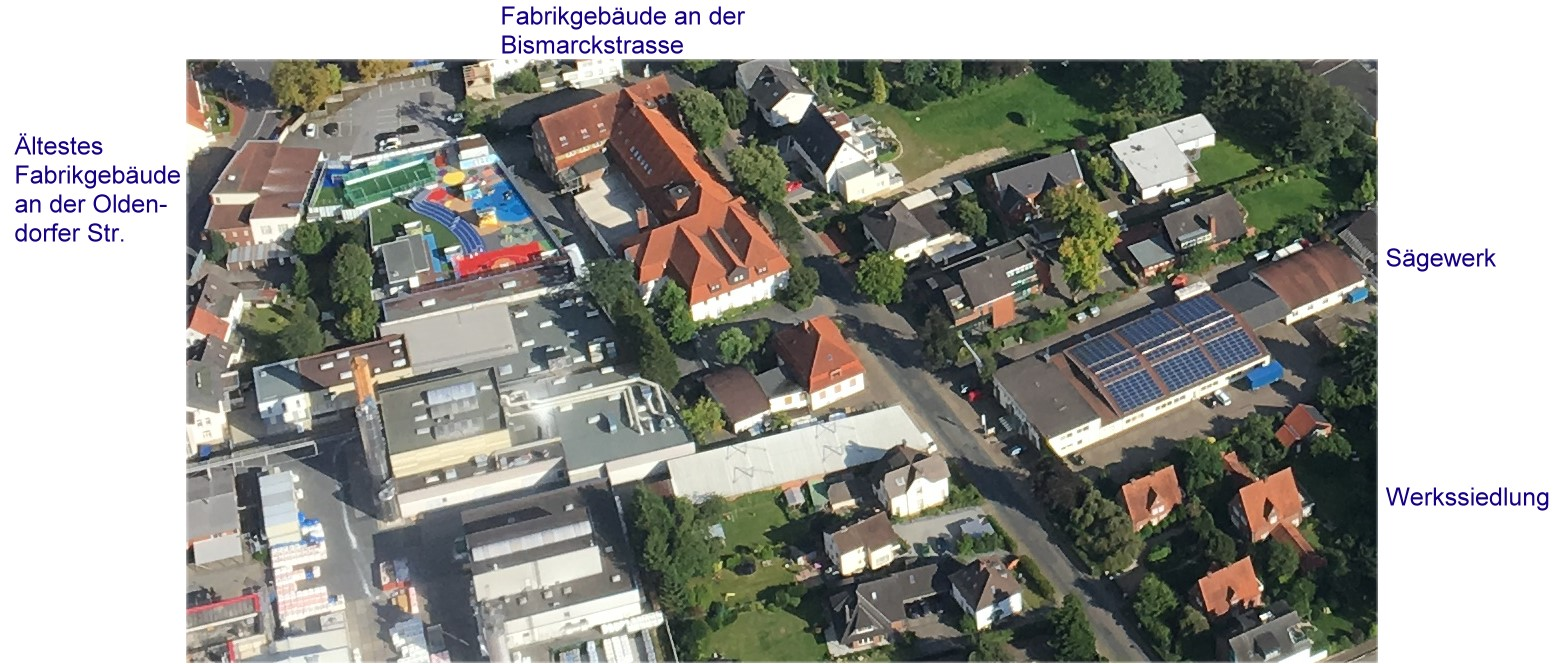
Remaining buildings of the MMM, 2017

== Products ==
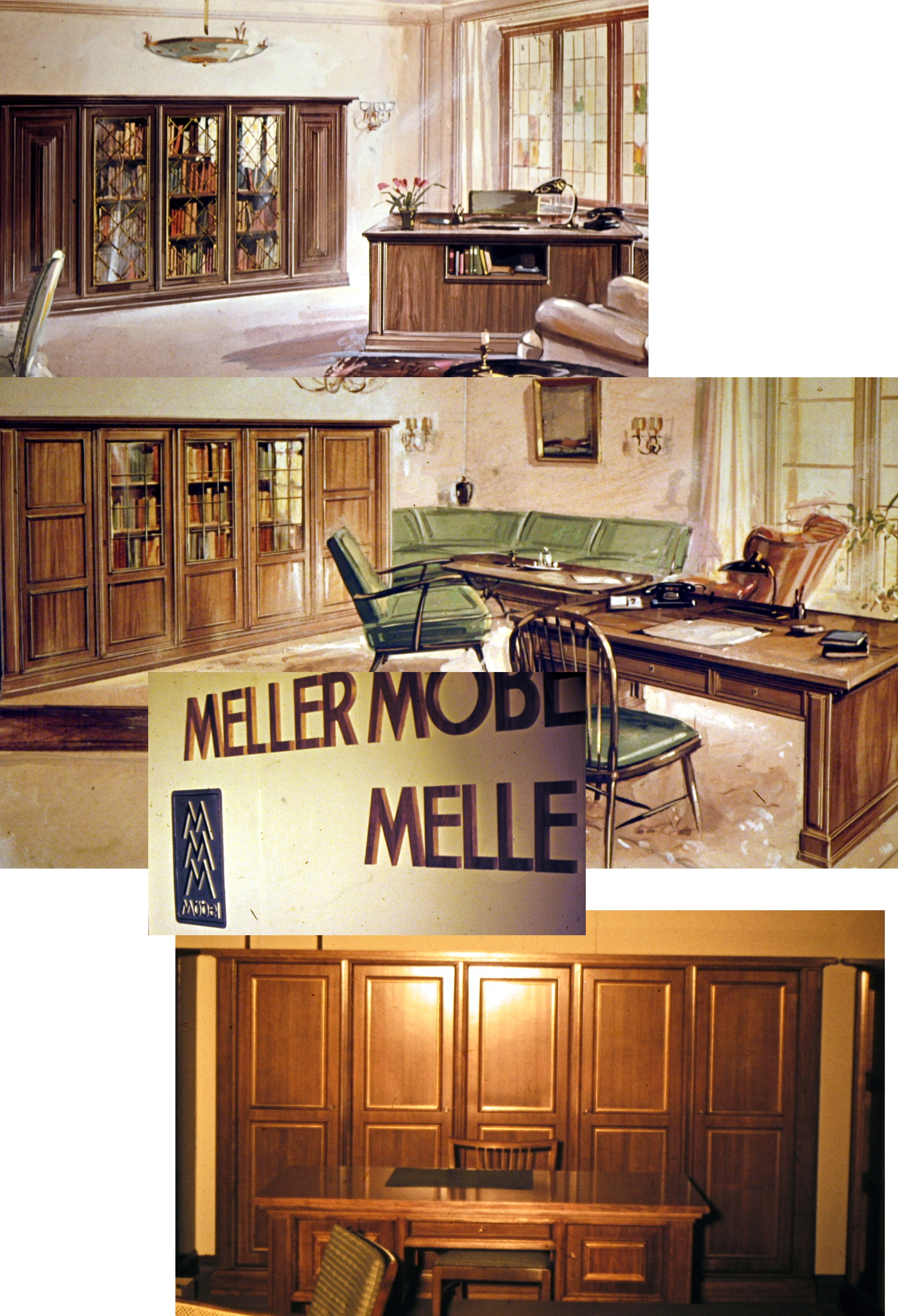
Furniture catalogue 1955

- 1909-1930: rubbing varnish, pored and painted bedrooms, dining rooms and living rooms as well as natural lacquered kitchens.
- 1930-1939: Elegant sanded lacquer, bedroom and daughter rooms as well as natural and coloured lacquer kitchens
- 1945-1952: Modern kitchens, bedrooms, living rooms and writing cabinets
- 1952-1975: High-quality period furniture, modern living rooms, business and study (room)s as well as office furniture, upholstered furniture and tubular steel armchairs.

For its furniture, Meller Möbelfabrik was the holder of some patents such as for a piece of furniture convertible into a desk or a special cabinet insert. In the mid-1950s, when bookcases became fashionable, MMM had the brand name "Socrates Wohnmöbel" for these models in order to appeal to educated customers. The name was so well received by customers that the entire furniture range was soon sold under this name.

The furniture was sold throughout Federal Republic to wholesalers and retailers for home furniture, bank furnishings and school furniture. The trademark with the superimposed MMM was used from around 1930. Probably the most prominent end customer was Emperor Haile Selassie of Ethiopia, who bought a study of MMM.

== Literature ==
- Stefanie Bietz: Timber Trade and Furniture Consumption in Europe. On the Self-Representation of Bourgeois Social Circles around 1900. Themenportal Europäische Geschichte. 19 December 2010, pp. 1–4. www.europa.clio-online.de
- Oliver Bonkamp: Cooperations and Networks in the Furniture Industry of the East Westphalia-Lippe Region. Dissertation. University of Paderborn, 2005.
- Grönenberger Heimathefte
- Rolf G. Heinze: Regional innovation systems: an economic sociological view. 2004. SSOAR-WP. No. 121395
- H. U. Jung: Structure and Development of Industry in Lower Saxony. Ed.: Wissenschaftliche Gesellschaft zum Studium Niedersachsens e.V., Kiel/Hamburg, Series: Neues Archiv für Niedersachsen, Industrieland Niedersachsen. Publisher: Wachholtz, Kiel/Hamburg, Volume, 1/2016, Nomos, e-library, ISBN print: 978-3-529-06464-7, ISBN online: 978-3-529-09604-4
