= Pundt & Kohnert =

German timber import and wood processing company

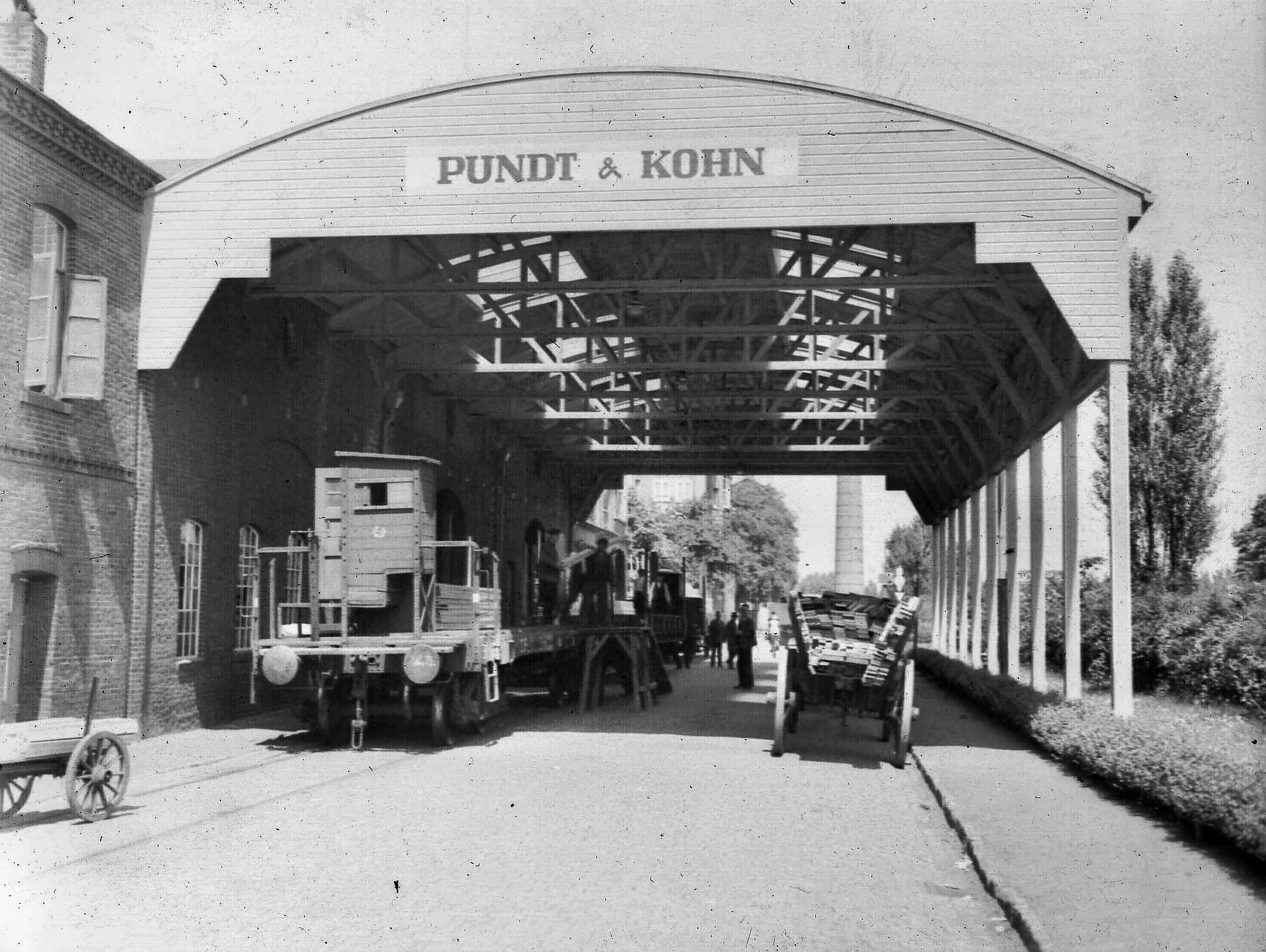
- P & K terminal Geestemünde
- Formerly: Pundt & Kohn (renamed Pundt & Kohnert in 1937)
- Type: OHG (General Partnership)
- Industry: Timber trade, timber import, sawmill and planing mill
- Founded: 1863
- Founder: F. J. S. Kohn
- Fate: company liquidated due to death of owners in 1967
- Headquarters: Geestemünde, Free Hanseatic City of Bremen, Germany
- Key people: Franz Kohn, Hans Kohnert, Gerhard Kohnert
- Products: square timber, profile strips, round bars lumber
- Number of employees: 150 as of February 1943
- Subsidiaries: Meller Möbelfabrik, Melle (MMM)
- Footnotes; Corresponding article in the German Wikipedia

Pundt & Kohn OHG (general partnership) was a German timber import and wood processing company. It was founded in 1862 by F. J. S. Kohn in Geestemünde. Until it was destroyed by Allied bombing in 1944, it was one of the oldest and most important companies in its branch on the lower Weser. The company was dissolved in the third generation in 1967 after the death of its last owner, Hans Kohnert.

The rise and fall of the company is considered exemplary for the history of a medium-sized Hanseatic family company, which Thomas Mann also used as an example for his literary monument, the social novel on the Buddenbrooks.

== History ==
=== Founding (1863–1879) ===
The sailing ship captain and shipowner Franz Johann Syabbe Kohn founded this wood import company in Geestemünde in 1862. He expanded a warehouse, with two floors and three cellars, on the Geestemünd dike near the old Geeste bridge to the residential office and warehouse. That summer, the firm merged with the timber trade of Captain Dietrich Pundt, also located on the Geeste dike. They cofounded Pundt & Kohn (P & K). Business flourished thanks to the construction of new port facilities on the Geeste river and the growing demand for pit timber, railway sleepers, and construction timber for residential and factory buildings. Once the domestic supply of wood could no longer meet this great demand, the company shifted to importing wood, mainly from Scandinavia, Russia and partly from America, from where precious woods were obtained. Given the weight of the goods, the waterway was by far the most cost-efficient transport until well into the 19th century. Wood importing companies concentrated on the lower reaches of rivers, such as the Weser and the Elbe, from which the imported and processed wood was distributed by barge and later by rail. This also applied to the P & K company, whose first wood storage areas were in Deichstraße (later called Bussestraße) directly on the Geeste dike shortly before the confluence of the Geeste with the Weser. Here the owner's original residential and office building stood until the Second World War. After five years of cooperation, co-owner Pundt left the company in 1868 due to illness. From then on, Kohn continued the timber import business, and supported his shipping company with ships and ship shares (‘’Guayana’’ and the Briggs ‘’Marianne’’, ‘’Auguste’’ and ‘’Salia’’), until he died on August 13, 1879. Son Franz took over the family business.

=== Prime-age and second generation (1879–1909) ===
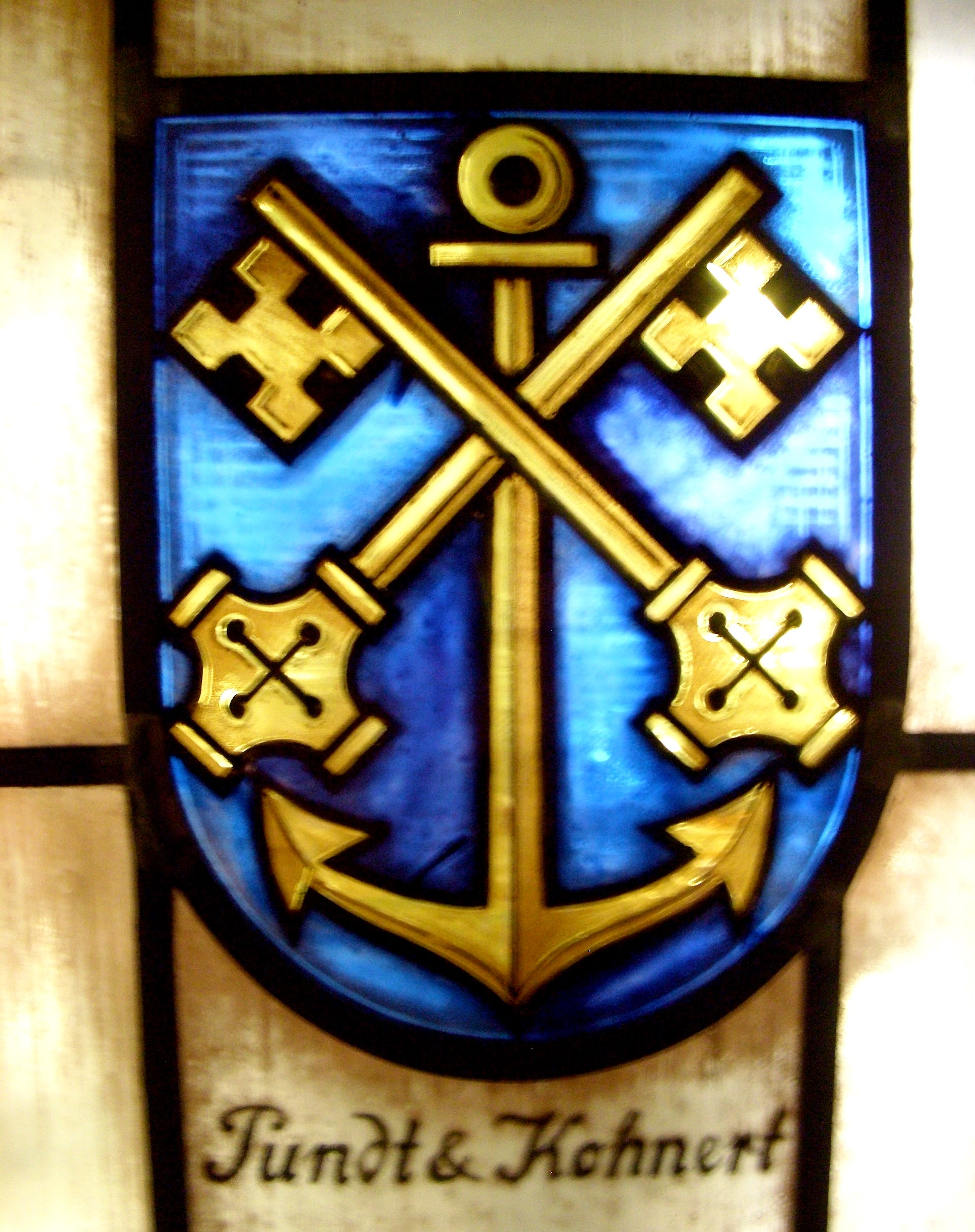
'Cabinet pane' (glass painting) Pundt & Kohnert, 1938

The company outgrew its storage areas on the Geeste. In the new industrial port of Geestemünde, construction and storage areas were available, which were also separated from the Geeste by a lock. Therefore, these areas were unaffected by tides and largely ice-free. On the west and north side of the cross-canal, the connecting waterway between the main canal and Geestemünde, inaugurated in 1877, P & K built new storage sheds extending 300 m. Large two-story storage buildings were designed for import. Open storage buildings completed the picture. Storage space reached more than 10,000 m^{2}. Around 1890 the company imported approximately 30,000 cubic meters of wood annually, compared to 25,000 solid cubic meters of its major competitor Chr. Külken, founded in Geestemünde in 1872.

To facilitate their imports, P & K founded its own steamship shipping company at the end of the 1880s with two ships of 750 and 1,150 tons, specially prepared for timber imports. Further ships were planned in 1890. A new office building at Schönianstraße 15 was built then. In 1887 the Kohn family moved into a new villa at nearby Borriesstraße 6.

Together with the two other large timber importing and processing companies in Geestemünde, Chr. Kuelken and Rogge, P & K systematically expanded the timber trade until the 1890s. It shipped via inland waterway to the Upper Weser region, and by rail to the Ruhr region and other industrial centers. However, the customs union of the Lower Weser towns (1888) and the inclusion of the timber harbour in a much larger spatial and economic sales area led to growth. Timber imports on the Lower Weser tripled within just a decade.

The various stages of development of industrial woodworking in the 19th century, which developed cyclically, had a decisive influence on P & K operations. Planing machines played a key role in this. As early as 1877, P & K applied for a permit for a sawmill and planing mill on the cross channel. In 1890, P & K built a modern sawing and planing mill with round rod production at the head of the cross-canal, between Industriestraße, Kanalstraße and Sägestraße, which traded under the name Geestemünder Holzindustriewerke Backhaus & Co. In contrast to the unrealized project of 1877, the company now had a direct rail connection to Industriestraße.

At that time, P & K was one of the oldest and largest companies in this branch of the Lower Weser, and P & K was by far the largest in terms of turnover.

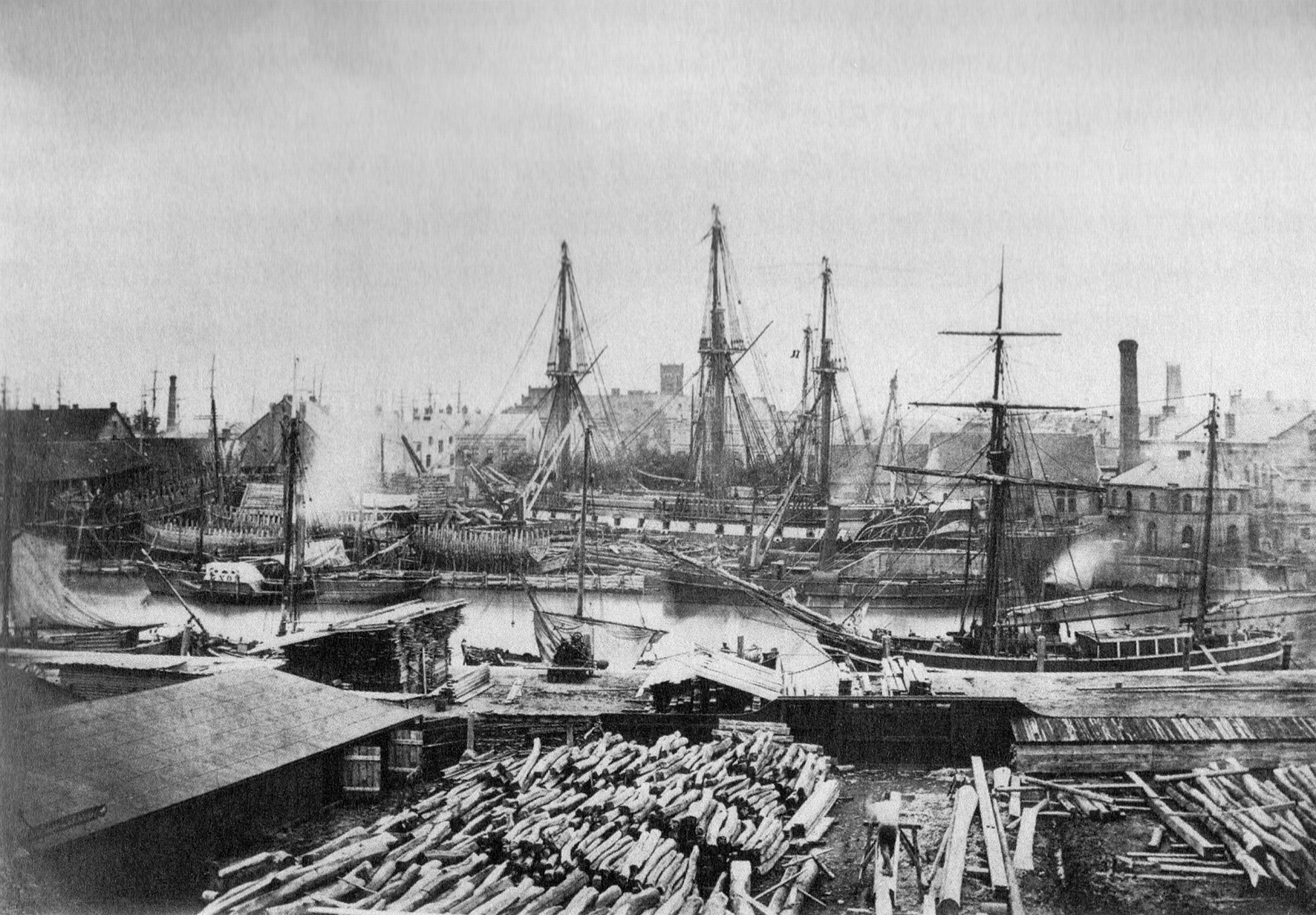
timber yard of P&K at the Geeste river, around 1869

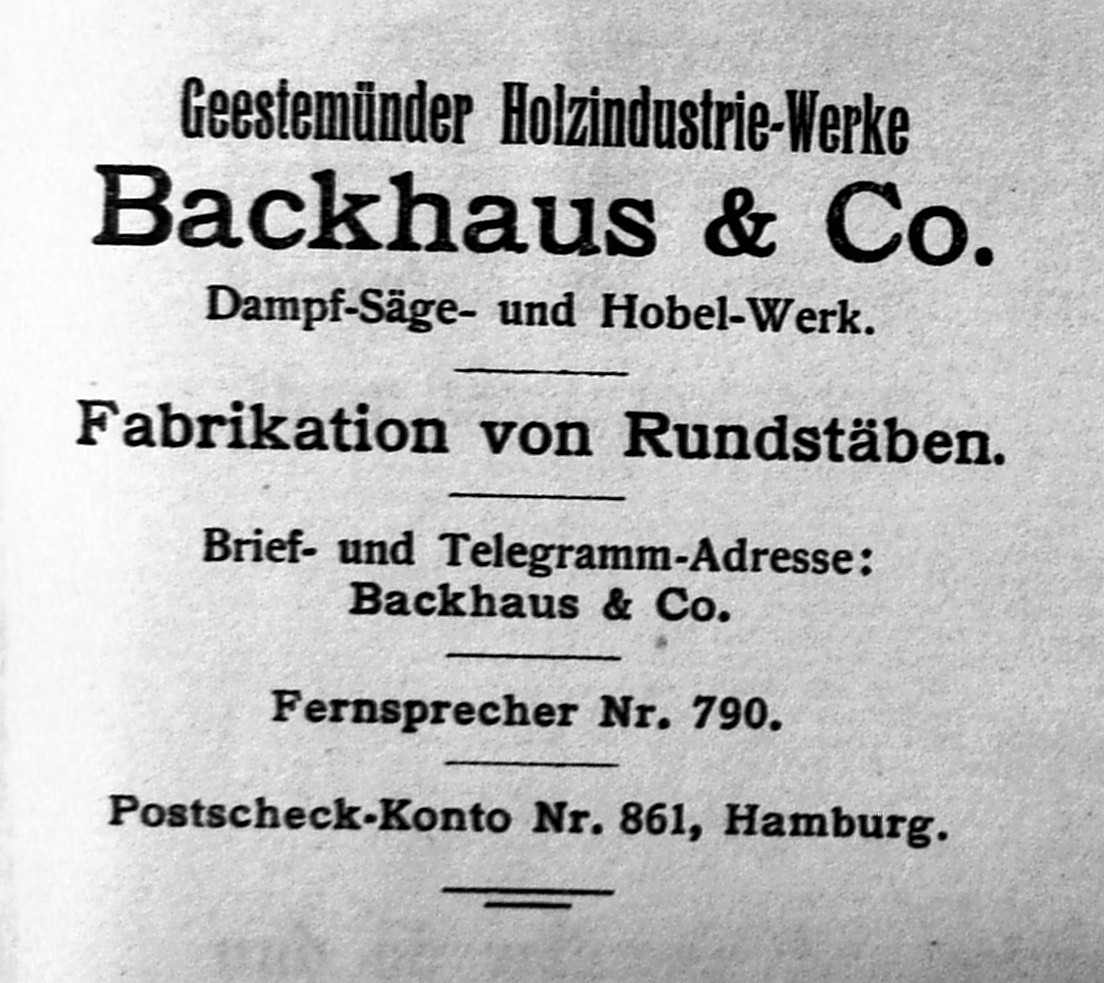
Backhaus Ltd., letterhead, 1930s

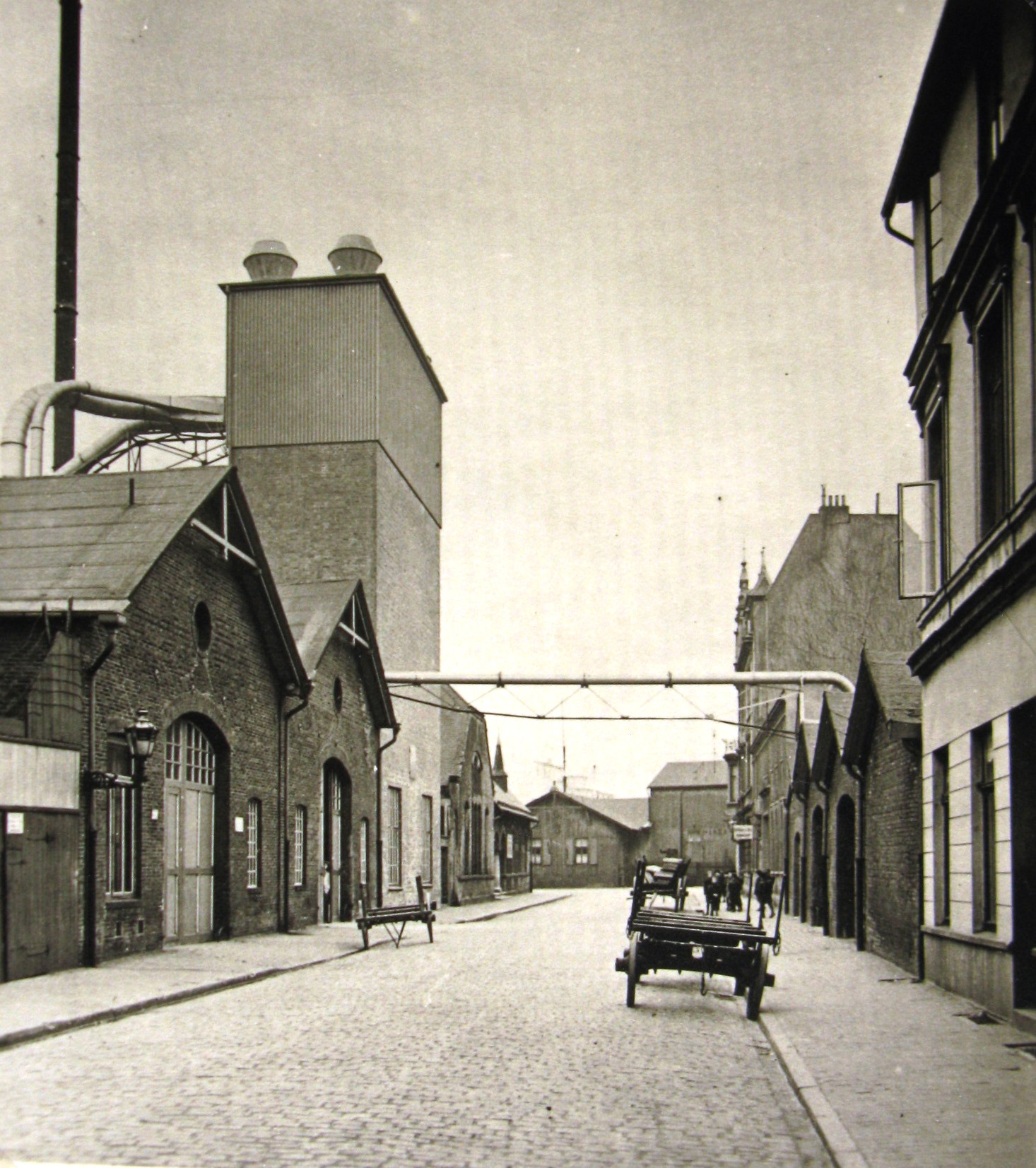
P & K sawmill and planing mill, 1930s

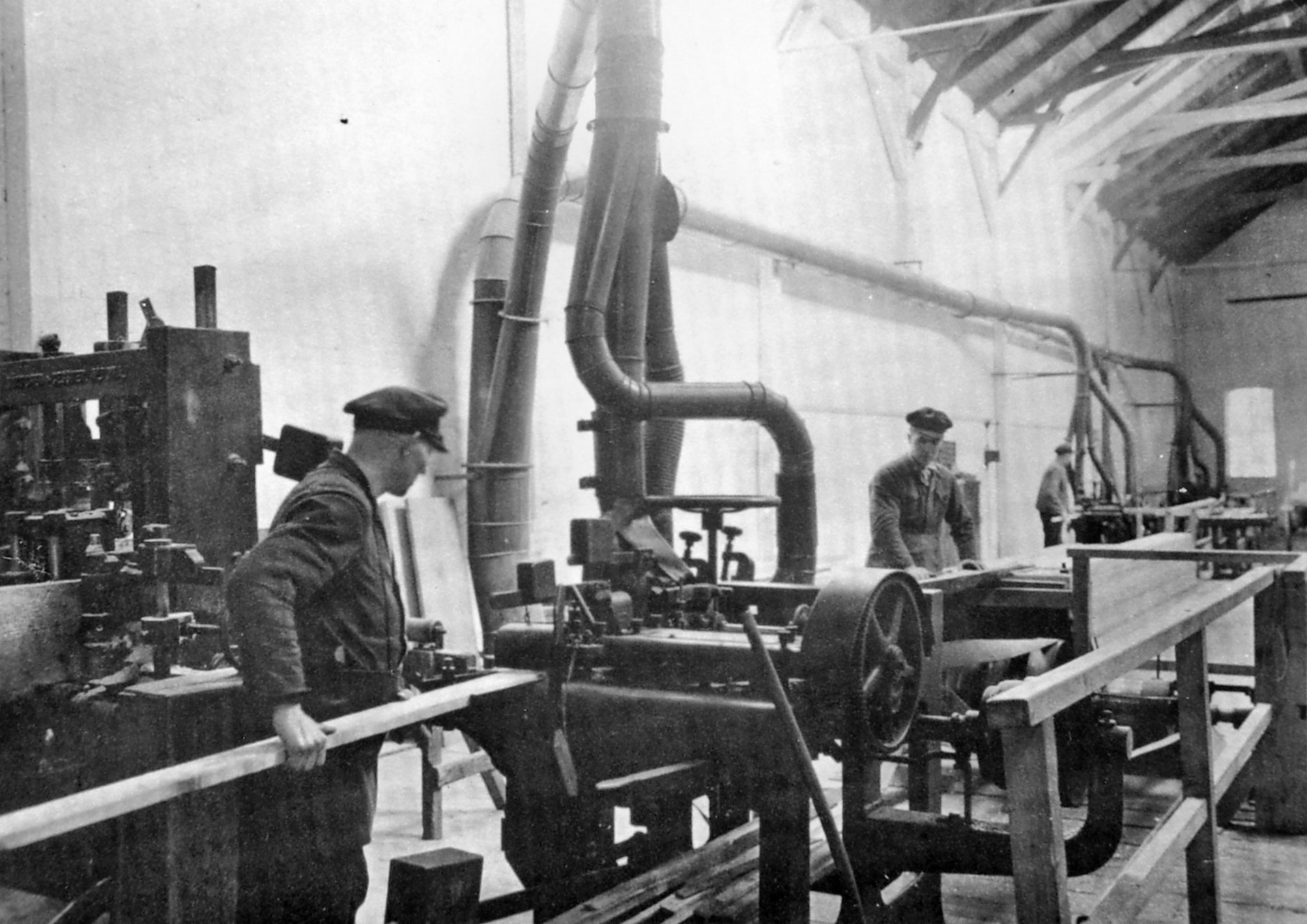
P &K planningmil, 1930s

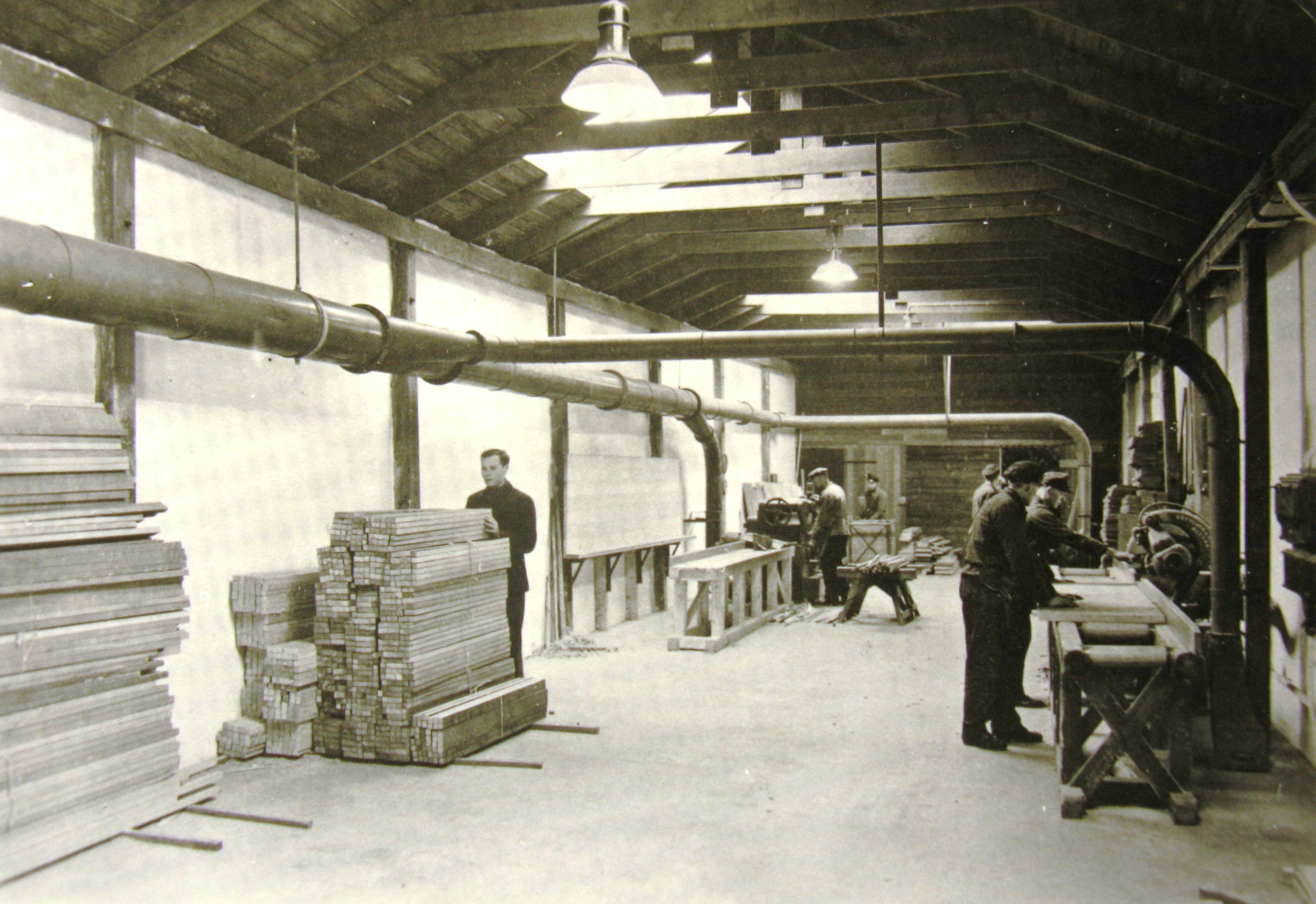
P & K sawmill, 1930s

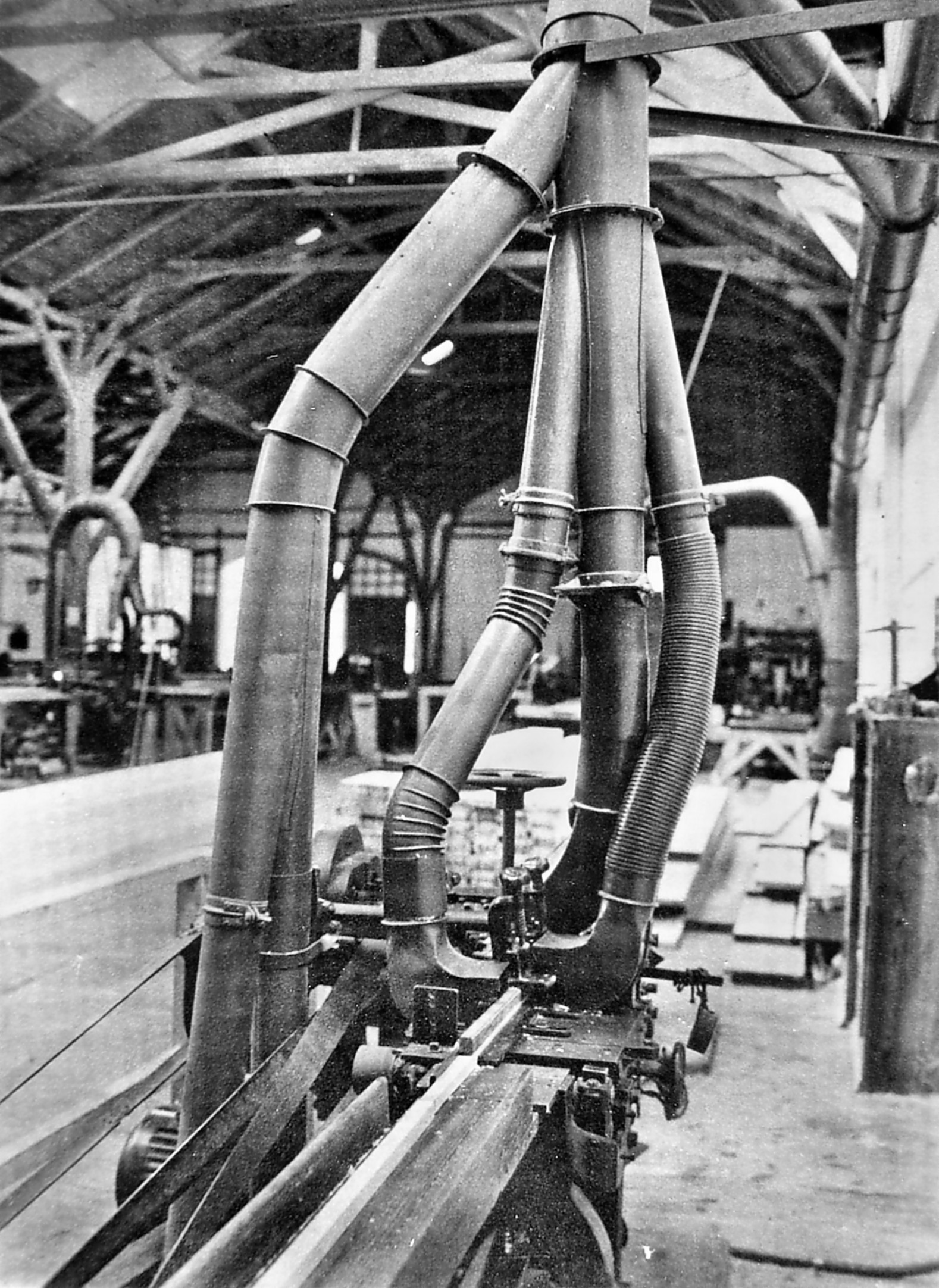
Sawmill extraction systems, 1930s

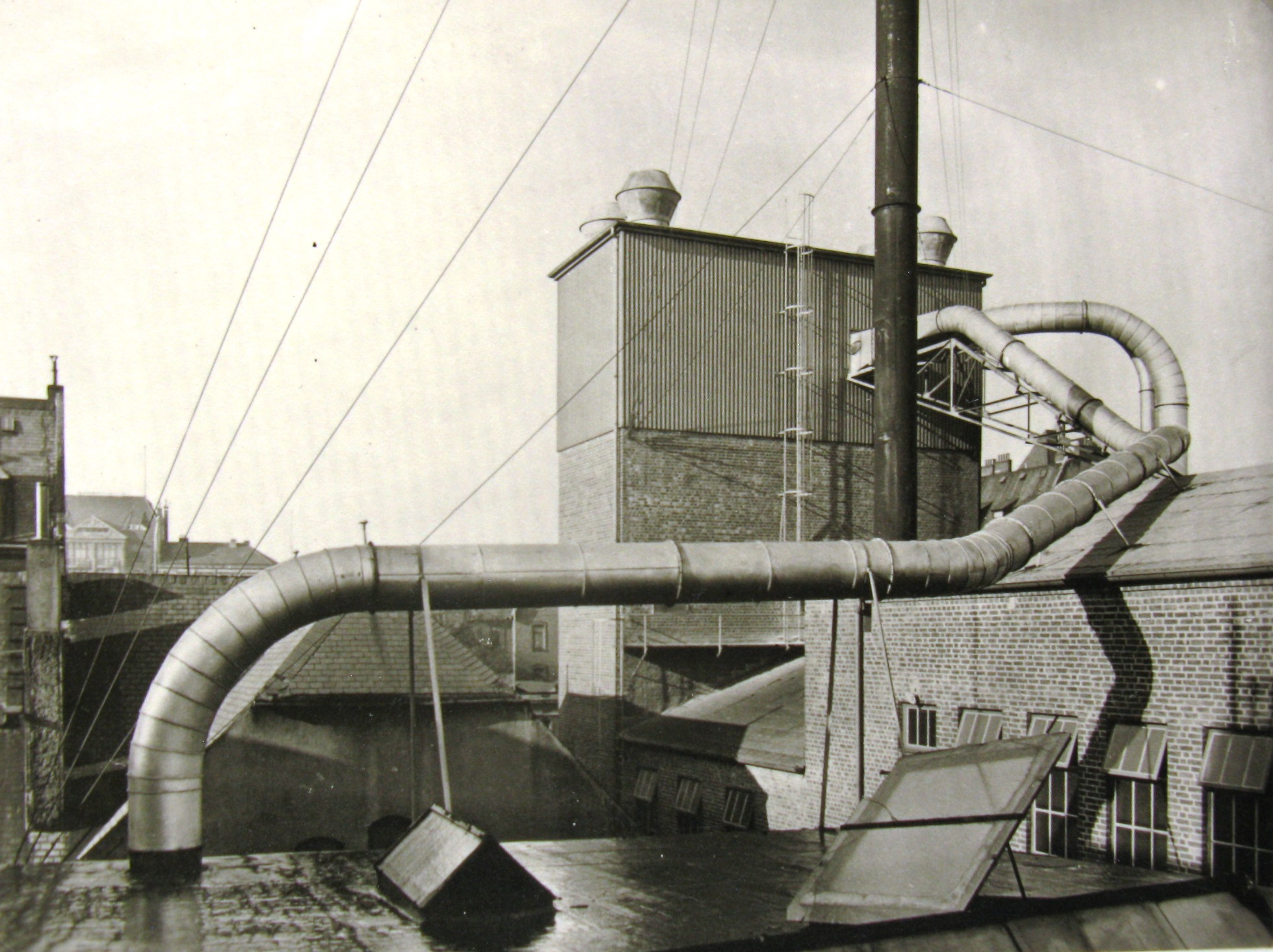
Sawdust extraction system, 1930s

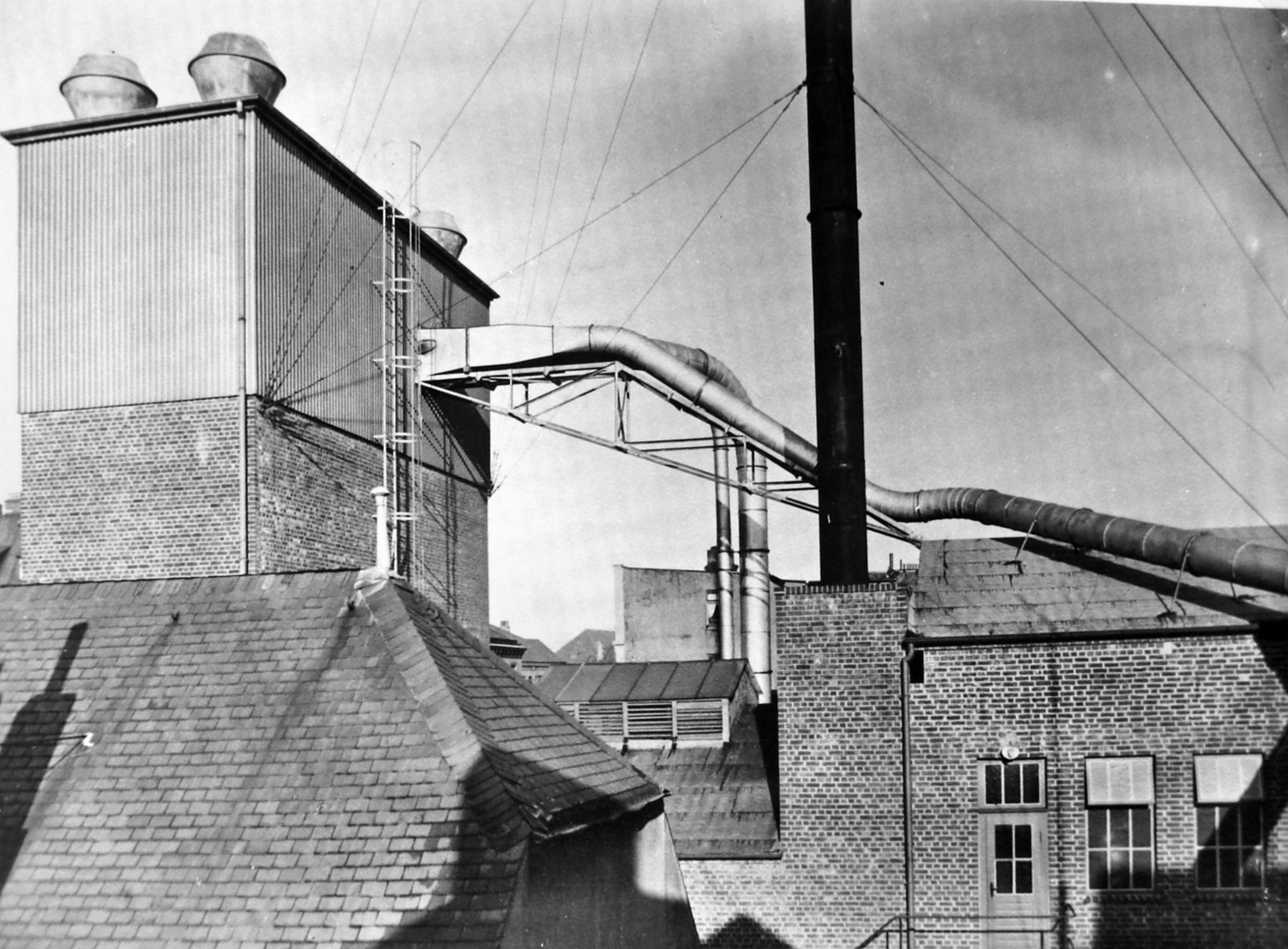
Sawdust tower, 1930s

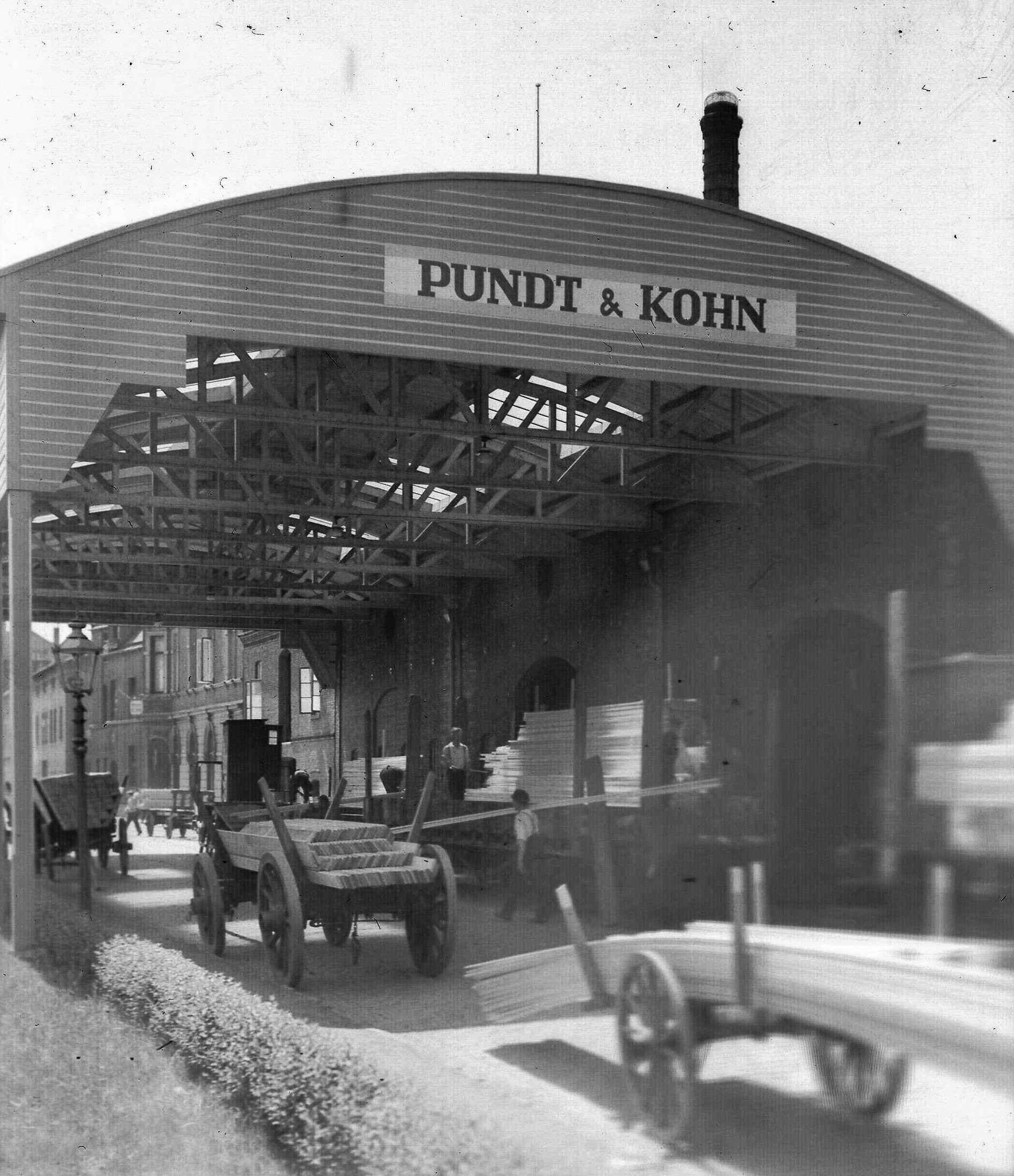
Timber loading ramp, 1936

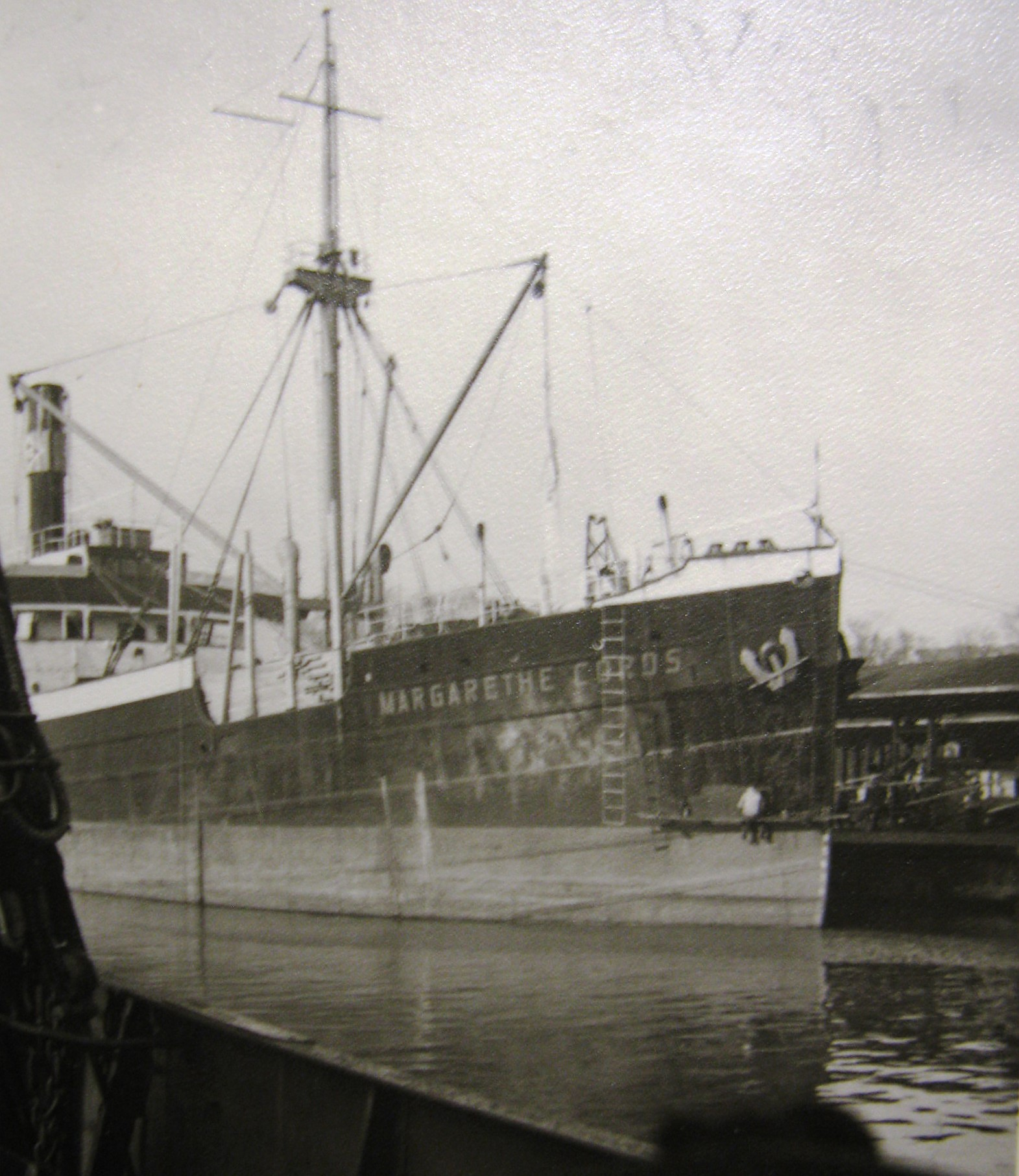
SS Margarethe Cords, unloading of imported timber at the P &K pier, 1929

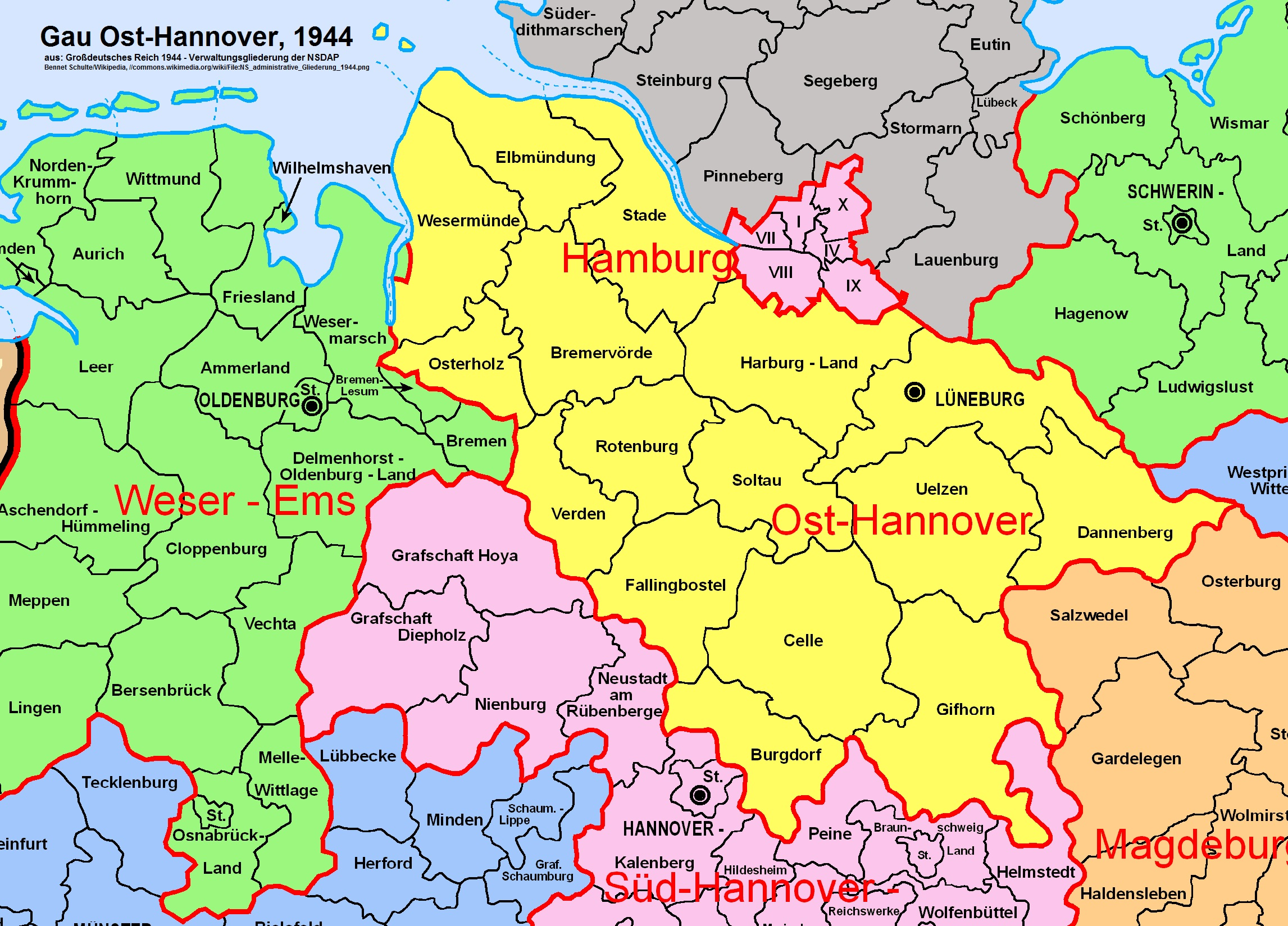
Map of the ‚Gau East Hanover‘, 1944

=== Expansion and third generation (1909–1945) ===
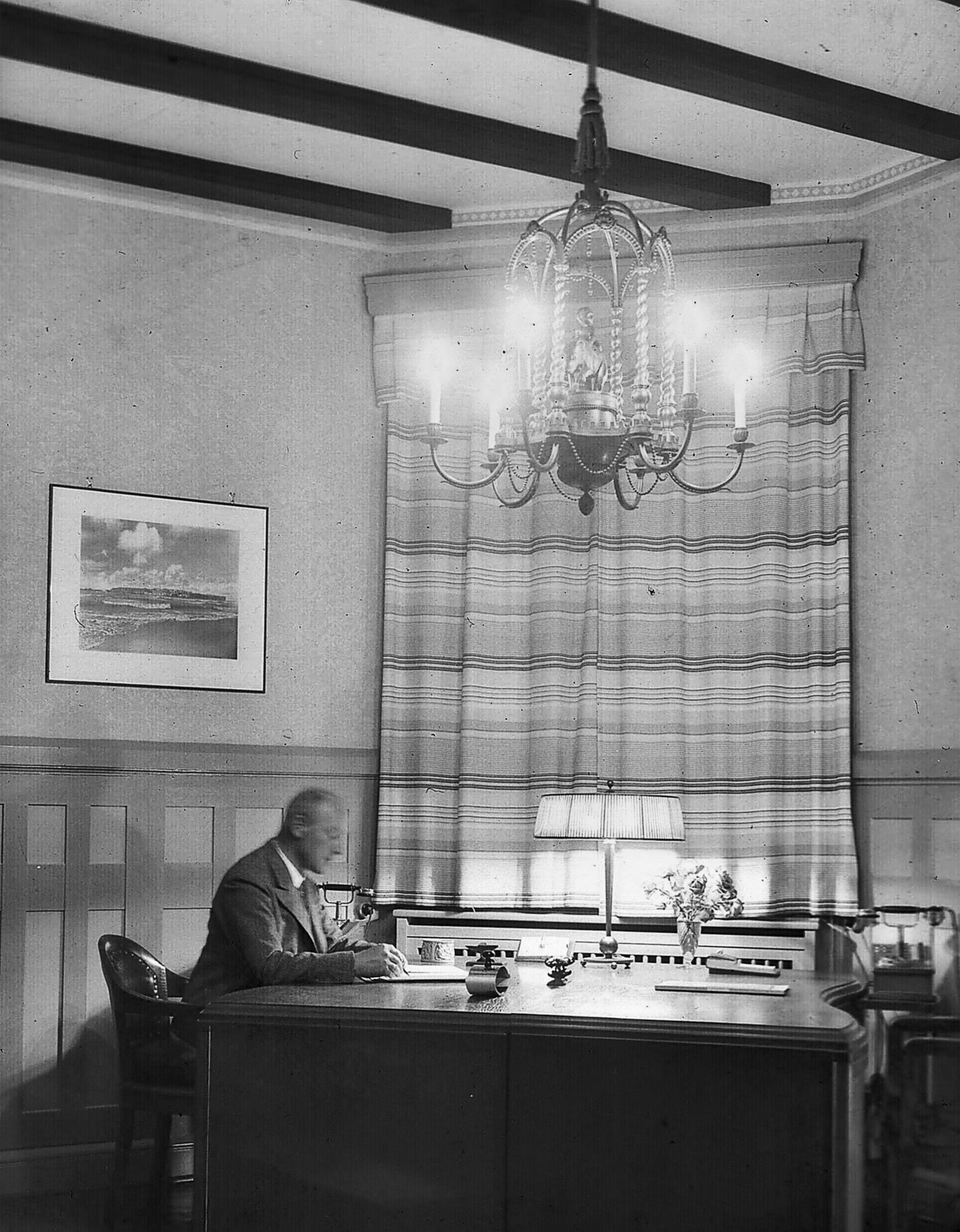
Hans Kohn in his office, 1937

Pundt & Kohn was a major creditor to the insolvent J.H. Krumnack, a furniture factory, steam sawmill, and timber dealer in Melle. For this reason and also out of family interests, P & K took it over on September 27, 1909 in a foreclosure auction. After Franz died in 1909, his son Hans continued the business. His older son, Gerhard, took over the management of the Melle factory, which was renamed Meller Möbelfabrik Ltd (trading name: MMM) in 1909. Its main business was furniture manufacturing as entered in the commercial register. The sole owner was the general partnership (OHG) Pundt & Kohn in Geestemünde, in which both brothers were personally liable and authorized signatories.

Later they founded the company Unterweser Holzhandel Ltd, Wesermünde (‘Lower Weser timber trade’, Wesermuende). The sole owner was their mother, Johanne Kohn, Franz's widow, who died in 1909. Hans was the managing director, who together with his brother Gerhard, combined four companies within the framework of a group of legally independent businesses: the parent company Pundt & Kohn, MMM, Backhaus & Co and Unterweser Holzhandel Ltd. This served the purpose of tax avoidance, in part through profit transfer as well as offsetting profits and losses between them, which reflected different businesses, wages, and taxes, depending on size and situation. The value of P & K's timber stocks was 1,252,225 ℛ︁ℳ︁, according to the 1926 trade tax declaration. That would correspond to a purchasing power of about €5 million in 2017. Apart from that, the tax flexibility was vital for P & K because of the severe losses in the Great Depression (1929–32), from which the furniture factory in Melle suffered less. During this time, P & K declared life-threatening losses of over 400,000 ℛ︁ℳ︁ due to the failure of trade credit receivables of business customers who had gone bankrupt.

In 1937, Hans applied to change the family and company name to ‘Kohnert'. This was approved by the ministry on August 14, 1937. The reason was growing hostility vis à vis the company and family because Kohn "sounded" Jewish. In 1941 senator Kohnert was appointed Wehrwirtschaftsführer (1941–1945) and President of the newly created Chamber of Commerce of the Gau of East Hanover (1943–1945). During the war, timber imports at P & K concentrated on (neutral) Sweden, and in particular on the Kramfors sawmill in the Härnösand Municipality in northern Sweden.

=== Reconstruction and the end (1945–1967) ===
The P & K factories, as well as the mansion of the Kohnert family, were completely destroyed during the Allied bombing raids on Bremerhaven on September 18, 1944.

By contrast, the Meller Möbelfabrik subsidiary survived undamaged. The office building at Schönianstraße 15 remained largely undamaged and was converted into the Kohnert family's residential and office building by 1948. The build-up phase after the war was delayed, however, as the American occupying power temporarily banned the company owner from his profession (1945–47) because of his activities as president of the Gau chamber of commerce and as Wehrwirtschaftsführer under the Nazi regime. In addition, parts of the company's quay facilities on the cross channel were confiscated by Allied forces for military purposes and were therefore not available to the company. Moreover, the military government initially forbade the payment of compensation for war damage, applied for in 1945, totalling 1.1 million ℛ︁ℳ︁, apart from that from an advance of 245,000 ℛ︁ℳ︁ already approved before the end of the war by the Nazi government. The final approval under the Equalisation of Burdens Act was delayed for decades. In 1967, after the death of the owners and managing directors and the liquidation of the companies, a fraction of the requested compensation - offset against the advance paid in 1945 - was paid out to the heirs.

While P & K was able to resume importing wood in 1948, the financial means were not sufficient to build up the destroyed sawmill and planing mill. Therefore, P & K had to have its wood cut by its major competitor, the Külken company, which significantly reduced its profit. P & K never recovered, despite the backlog demand for sawn timber and construction timber in post-war Germany in the times of the economic miracle. Even the profit transfer (1956–66) by the subsidiary Meller Möbelfabrik, as part of the merger in 1937, could no longer stop the decline. The company was dissolved after the death of its owners Gerhard (in 1962) and Hans (in 1967). It closed on October 13, 1967.

== Company owners ==
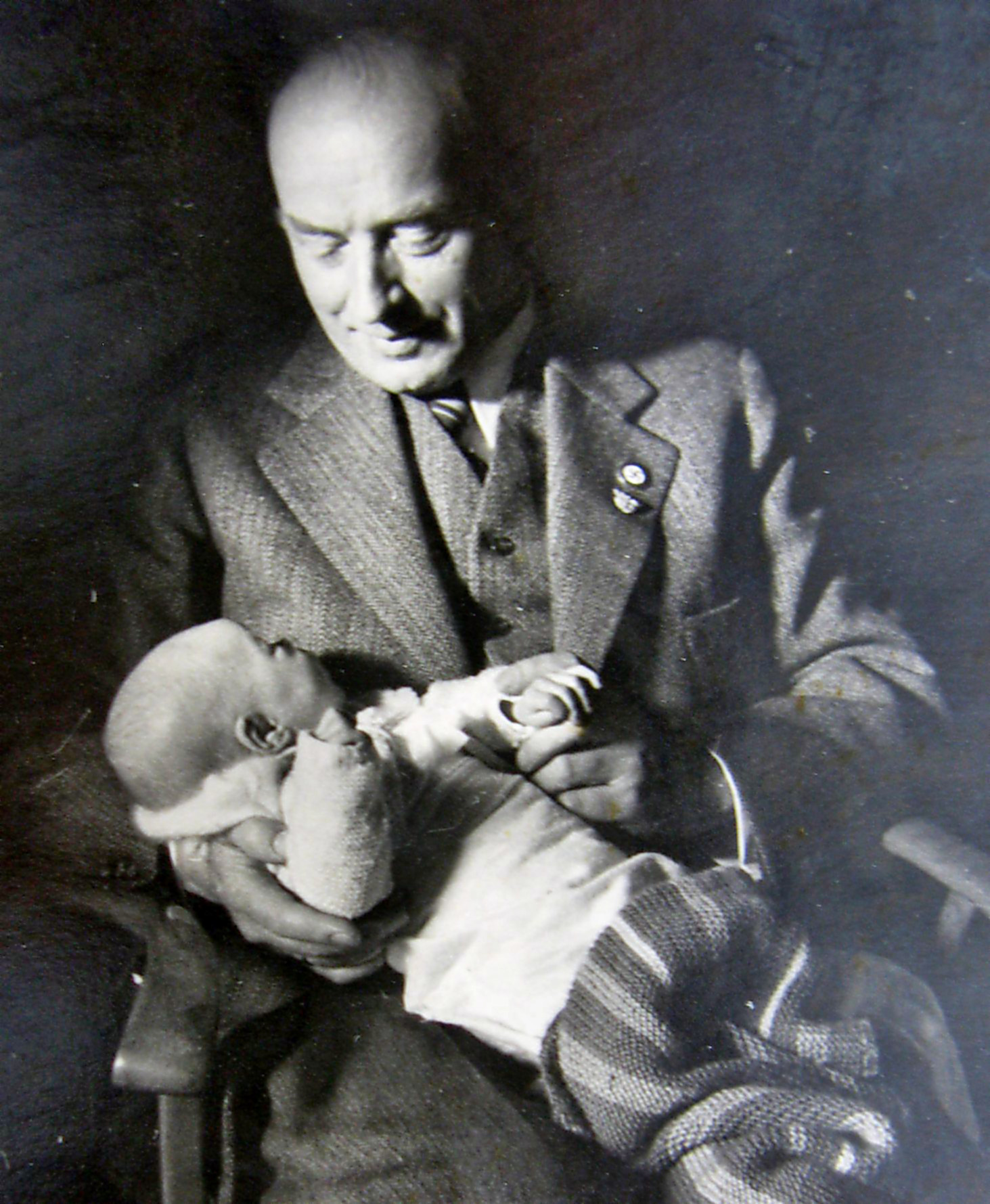
Hans Kohnert at the christening of his first granddaughter with golden NS party badge and Wehrwirtschaftsführer pin, March 1944

With the establishment of his timber import company in Geestemünde in 1862, ship owner Franz Johann Syabbe Kohn (1828-1879) opened a business for himself and his family. In addition, he secured the Kohn family a new source of income. His family heads had been captains and owners of vessels sailing from Brake, a small town at the lower Weser in the grand duchy of Oldenburg, to the Americas and the Caribbean for generations. He and his mother had looked for new commercial activities given their uncertain prospects at the end of the Age of Sail and the dawning age of steamships. After his death, his son Franz Kohn (1857-1909) took over the company. He was followed by his two sons Hans (Johannes) Kohnert (1887-1967) and Gerhard Kohnert (1882-1962). The latter mainly built up the subsidiary Meller Möbelfabrik Ltd in Melle (MMM) starting in 1909. Within a few decades, it developed into an important furniture factory in what was then the Grönegau. Its managing director Franz Kohn, like his son Hans, were Senators for life in Bremerhaven as well as members of the Bremerhaven Chamber of Commerce and Industry (IHK). Hans was elected its president in 1933. Later on, he was elected president of the Gauwirtschaftskammer Ost-Hannover (Chamber of commerce of the NS-Gau East Hanover, 1943–45). He was appointed Wehrwirtschaftsführer (1941–45). During his reign, the company experienced its heyday, and then its decline.

Nevertheless, in 1951, the chamber of commerce of Bremerhaven recognized Hans Kohnert's services to the development of trade in Bremen and beyond with the award of the honorary presidency. His brother Gerhard Kohnert was one of the founders of the Meller Volksbank (Credit Union, Melle) in 1921 and for a short time (1946) also mayor of Melle, installed by the British occupation force that had confiscated his mansion but allowed his business to continue. In 1953 he was awarded the Order of Merit of the Federal Republic of Germany for his services in building up the domestic furniture industry.

== Literature ==
- Stefanie Bietz: Holzhandel und Möbelkonsum in Europa Zur Selbstdarstellung bürgerlicher Gesellschaftskreise um 1900. Themenportal Europäische Geschichte, Band 1, 2010, clio-online
- Paul Hirschfeld: Hannovers Grossindustrie und Grosshandel (Hanover's large-scale industry and wholesale trade), eds.: Deutsche Export-Bank, Berlin. Publisher: Duncker & Humblot, Leipzig, XVI, 1891, 412 p.
- Julius Marchet: Der Holzhandel Norddeutschlands ('The timber trade in Northern Germany', in German). Publisher: F. Deuticke, Leipzig, Vienna, 1908
- J. Dirk Peters: Aus der Geschichte des Weser-Yachtclubs Bremerhaven. "Niederdeutsches Heimatblatt", Mitteilungsblatt der Männer vom Morgenstern, March 2005, Nr. 663 (about the use of former P & K timber storage halls on the transverse canal from 1966 by the Weser Yacht Club, Bremen, including photo)
- Spurensuche am Geestemünder Querkanal. n.a., "Niederdeutsches Heimatblatt", Mitteilungsblatt der Männer vom Morgenstern, Dezember 1995, Nr. 552, pp. 1–2
- Jürgen Rabbel: Vergessenes Kapitel der Geestemünder Geschichte. "Nordsee-Zeitung" (Bremerhaven), 30 November 2019 (review of a special exhibition "Kapitäne und Holzfabrikanten" on the history of 'Pundt&Kohn' by the 'Historisches Museum', Bremerhaven)
- Review on the "Special exhibition about wood wholesalers Pundt & Kohn", "Weser-Kurier", 5 January 2020
- Neue Sonderausstellung im HMB. Geschichte der Unternehmerfamilie Kohn in Geestemünde, no author, "Aktuelle Elbe-Weser. Die-Wochenzeitung für die Region", 27 December 2019, p. 9
- Richard Zimmermann: Deutschlands Holzbedarf ('Germany's need for wood', in German). Zeitschrift für die gesamte Staatswissenschaft / Journal of Institutional and Theoretical Economics. vol. 50, issue 4, 1894, pp. 573–582
