= Franz Kohn =

German entrepreneur

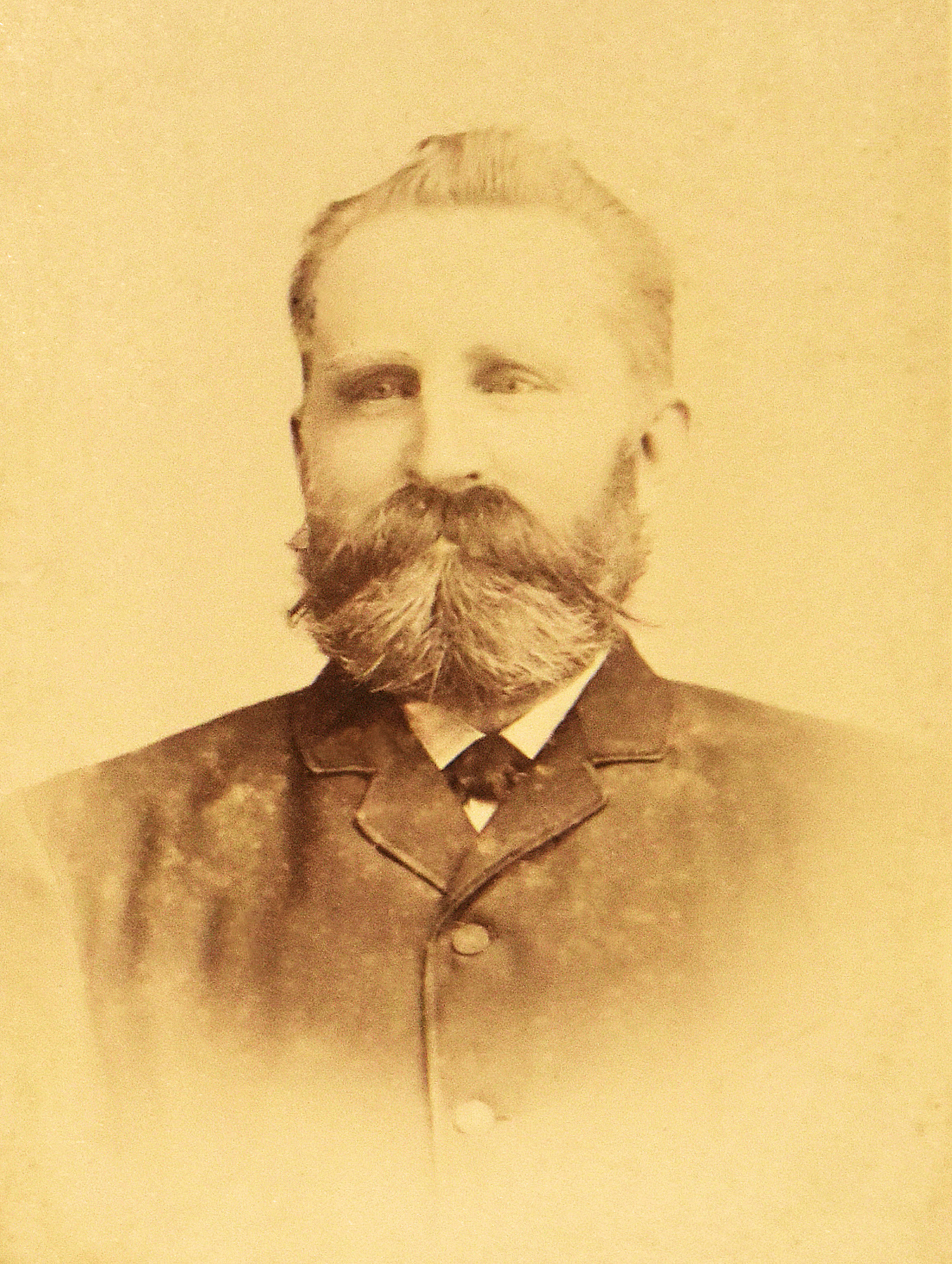
- Franz Kohn, around 1903
- Born: 15 December 1857; Geestemünde, Kingdom of Hanover
- Died: 24 March 1909 (aged 51); Bremerhaven, Germany
- Education: Grand-Ducal Saxon Art School, Weimar
- Occupations: entrepreneur, Chairman, senator
- Spouse(s): Maria Rebecca, née Riedemann (1827-1870)
- Children: Hans Kohnert and Gerhard Kohnert

Franz Kohn (15 December 1857 – 24 March 1909) was a German entrepreneur, wood wholesaler, senator of Geestemünde, and patron of the arts.

== Biography ==
=== Family ===
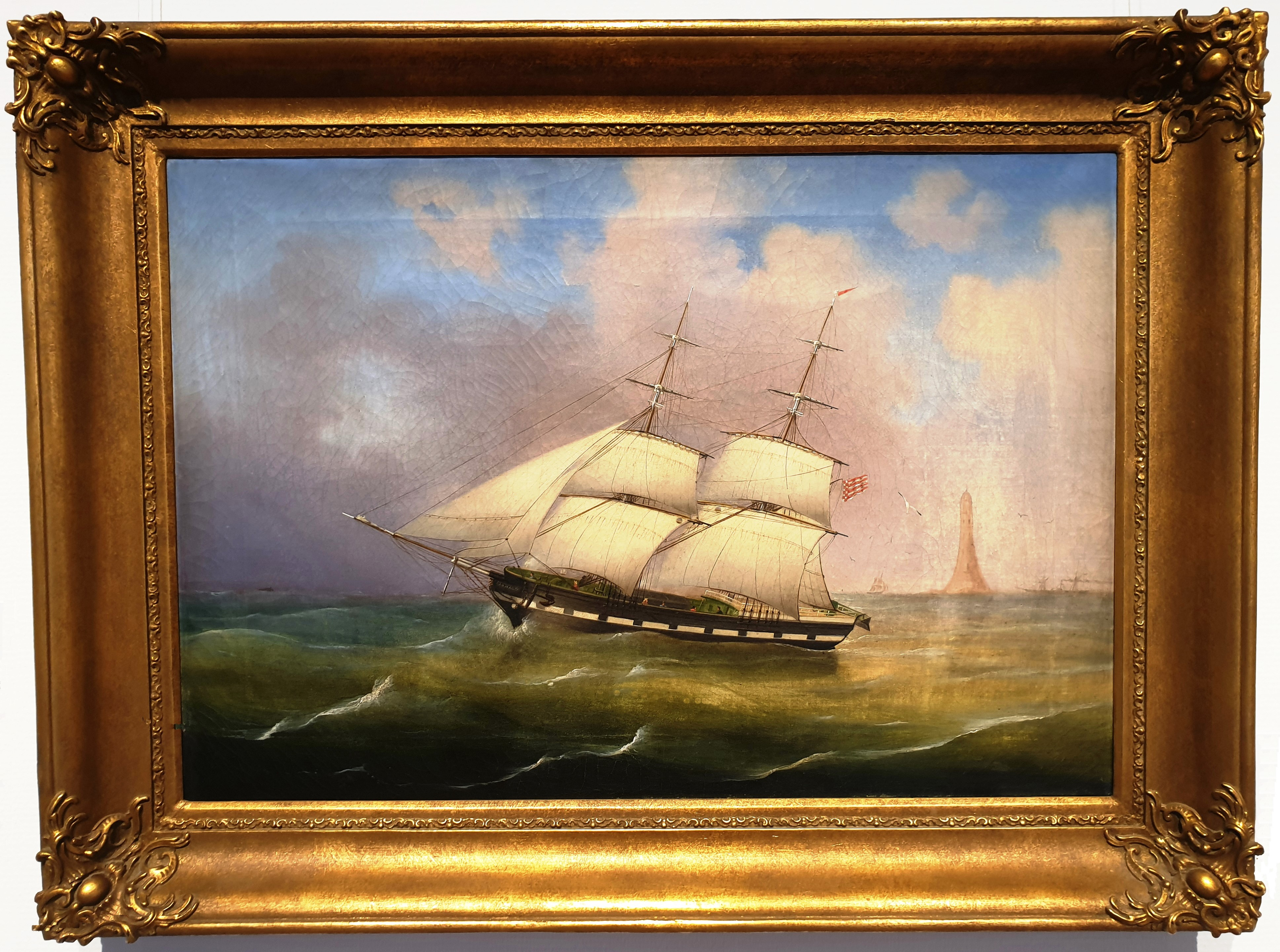
Brig "Johann", "Captain's portrait", for Franz Johann Syabbe Kohn (1828-1879), Franz Kohn's father, painted by de:Carl Justus Harmen Fedeler (1799-1858)

Franz Kohn, son of the captain, shipowner and timber merchant Franz Johann Syabbe Kohn (born 16 May 1828 in Klippkanne, in Brake (Unterweser); died 13 August 1879 in Geestemünde) and his wife Maria Rebecca, née Riedemann (1827-1870), was a timber wholesaler and entrepreneur and owned one of the largest timber import businesses in northern Germany. He was married to Johanna Margarethe, née Gehrels (1862-1925). The Kohn couple had two sons, Gerhard and Hans Kohn.

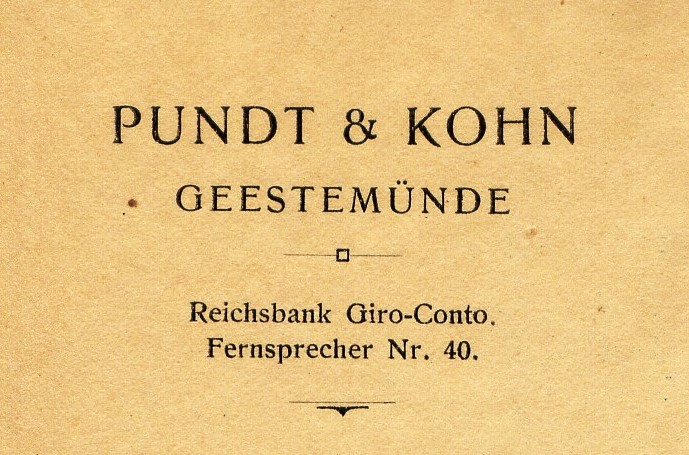
letterhead of the company Pundt & Kohn

=== Oeuvre ===
The ancestors were captains and owners of emigrant sailing ships that brought emigrants from Brake (Unterweser) and Bremerhaven to America in the 19th century and on the way back via the Caribbean on their way back. With the advent of steam shipping in the mid-1850s, the business became unprofitable. Franz Kohn's father settled down and in 1863 bought into a timber importing company Pundt & Kohn (P&K). Favoured by the construction of new port facilities on the Geeste (river) as well as the rapidly growing demand for pit timber, Railroad ties and timber for residential and factory buildings in the course of population growth and the industrial revolution of the 19th century, business flourished. Since the domestic timber supply could no longer meet this great demand, one shifted to importing timber mainly from Scandinavia, Russia and partly also from America, from where mainly precious lumber were obtained. Given the weight of the goods to be transported, the waterway was by far the most cost-effective until well into the 19th century. So it was no coincidence that timber import companies were concentrated precisely at the lower reaches of rivers such as the Weser, from where the imported and processed timber was distributed to the Centres of Industrialisation by barges, later increasingly also by railway.

This was also true for the P&K company, whose first timber storage yards were located in "Deichstraße" (later called "Bussestraße") directly on the Geeste dike, shortly from where the Geeste flows into the Weser. After only five years of working together, co-owner Diedrich Pundt left the company in 1868 due to illness. From then on, Franz Johann Syabbe Kohn continued to run the well-developing timber import business alone, combined with his shipping company with its own ships or ship shares (Guayana and the brigs Marianne, Auguste and Salia), until he died on 13 August 1879. After that, his son Franz Kohn took over the parental business.

Franz Kohn was one of the four senators of Geestemünde at the end of the 19th century. He was also considered one of the forefathers of social housing in the region. In the early 1890s, he applied for permission for eight of his workers to build a housing estate near his company, on the Geestrücken in Hülsen, on the outskirts of Geestemünde, where there was neither sewerage nor electricity. In 1893 he received the building permit. Kohn transferred ownership of the "Workers' Colony in Hülsen", after its completion to the "Gemeinnütziger Kreisbauverein Geestemünde GmbH". The society let the houses to the residents for rent. Most of the workers moved in from East Frisia, Westphalia and the neighbouring Land Wursten. The expansion of the workers' settlement was largely completed by 1905. About 90 large families with a total of 500 members were already living there. The social solidarity of the residents was shown, among other things, in community life, e.g. the founding of a drummers' and pipers' choir.

== Literature ==
- Bickelmann, Hartmut (ed.) (2003): Bremerhavener Persönlichkeiten aus vier Jahrhunderten. A biographical encyclopaedia. Second, expanded and corrected edition. Bremerhaven: 2003: 172–174.
- Bickelmann, Hartmut (1996): Von Geestendorf nach Geestemünde - Räumlicher, gewerblicher und sozialer Strukturwandel im Umkreis des de:Holzhafen Geestemündes. In: Männer vom Morgenstern, Yearbook 75. Bremerhaven: 1996: 149–235.
- Hirschfeld, Paul (1891): Hannovers Grossindustrie und Grosshandel. Ed.: Deutsche Export-Bank, Berlin / Duncker u. Humblot, Leipzig, XVI, 1891, 412 pp.
- Kobus, Klaus (1994): 'Grünhöfe' - Spuren vergangener Zeiten. Ed.: Geschichtswerkstatt 'Grünhöfe', Bremerhaven
- Marchet, Julius (1908): Der Holzhandel Norddeutschlands. Publisher F. Deuticke, Leipzig, Vienna, 1908.
- Zimmermann, Richard (1894): Deutschlands Holzbedarf. Zeitschrift für die gesamte Staatswissenschaft / Journal of Institutional and Theoretical Economics. Vol. 50, H. 4, 1894, pp. 573–582.
