= Osnabrück Uplands =

Low hills in the northwest of the Lower Saxon Hills near Osnabrück in Germany

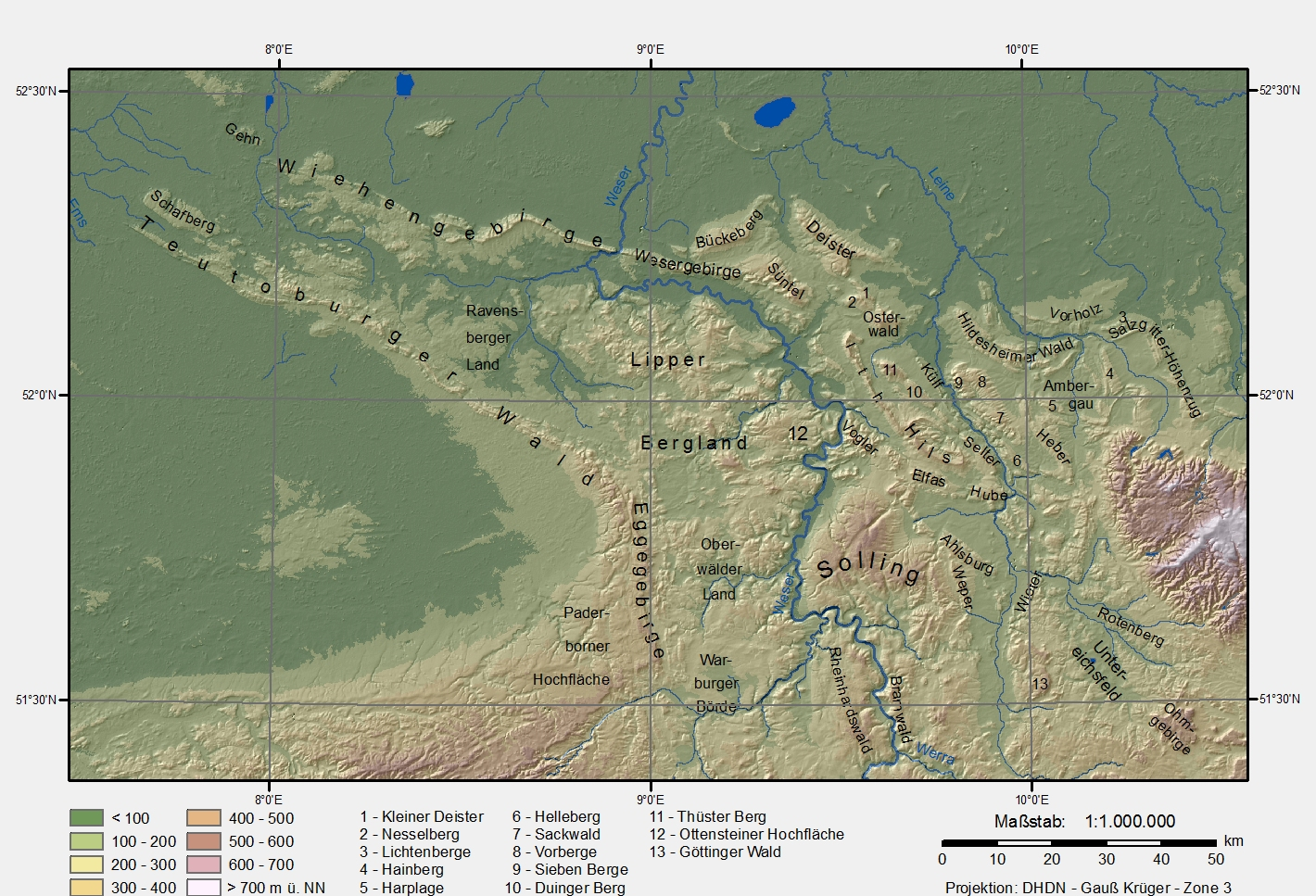

Highest point
- Peak: Hesterbrink
- Elevation: 232.5 m above NHN

Dimensions
- Length: 30 km (19 mi)
- Area: 748.5 km^{2} (289.0 mi^{2})

Geography
- State: Lower Saxony
- Range coordinates: 52°16′02″N 8°03′11″E
- Parent range: Lower Weser Uplands, Lower Saxon Hills

The Osnabrück Uplands, Osnabrück Hills or, less commonly, Osnabrück Hill Country (German: Osnabrücker Hügelland or Osnabrücker Bergland), are the low hills, or Hügelland, rarely over 200 m above NHN, in the northwest of the Lower Saxon Hills near Osnabrück in Germany. They are bounded by the Wiehen Hills to the north and the Teutoburg Forest to the south. Regionally, especially in tourism, they are often referred to locally as the Osnabrücker Bergland, however this is usually not a precisely defined physical landscape, but refers to an area roughly comprising the municipal boundaries of Osnabrück and a narrow radius around the city. By contrast the natural region major unit known as the Osnabrücker Hügelland extends from north-west of Ibbenbüren to the Melle Hills north of Melle, behind which is their south-eastern continuation, the Ravensberg Hills.

The Osnabrück Uplands form the heart of the cultural region of Osnabrück Land. The unpopulated areas of the region, which covers 748.5 km^{2}, are a central part of the TERRA.vita Nature and Geopark.

== Natural regions ==
The Osnabrück Uplands are divided from north (west to east) to south (west to east) as follows:

- (to Lower Saxon Hills)
    - 535 Osnabrück Uplands (Osnabrücker Hügelland)
      - 535.2 Achmer Foreland (Achmer Vorland) (western north)
        - 535.20 Neuenkirchen Plateau (Neuenkirchener Platte) (western north)
        - 535.21 Gehn (eastern north)
        - 535.22 Vinter Lowlands (Vinter Niederungen) (central north)
        - 535.23 Wallenbrock Lowlands (Wallenbrocker Niederungen) (west)
        - 535.24 Seeste Plateau (Seester Platte( (centre)
        - 535.25 Halener Sande (east)
      - 535.0 Northern Osnabrück Uplands (Nördliches Osnabrücker Hügelland) (north)
        - 535.01 Barlager Sande (west)
        - 535.00 Wallenhorst Uplands (Wallenhorster Bergland) (north)
        - 535.02 Schledehausen Hills (Schledehauser Hügelland) (centre)
        - 535.03 Melle Heights (Meller Höhen) (with Melle Hills, southeast)
      - 535.3 Western Osnabrück Uplands Westliches Osnabrücker Hügelland (west)
        - 535.30 Westerkappelen Hill Country Westerkappelner Flachwellenland (north)
        - 535.31 Mettingen Foreland (Mettinger Vorland) (northwest)
        - 535.32 Schafberg Plateau (Schafbergplatte) (west)
        - 535.33 Ibbenbüren Basin (Ibbenbürener Senke) (western south)
        - 535.34 |Habichtswald (central south)
        - 535.35 Leeden Basin (Leedener Senke) (eastern south)
      - 535.1 Haseniederung
        - 535.10 Halen Depression (Halener Niederung)
        - 535.11 Osnabruck Depression (Osnabrücker Niederung)
      - 535.4 Southern Osnabrück Uplands (Südliches Osnabrücker Hügelland) (south)
        - 535.40 Holte Uplands (Holter Hügel- und Bergland)
        - 535.41 Ösede Basin (Öseder Mulde)
      - (to 534.0 Ohrbeck Heights = Dörenberg and its northwestern outliers)
        - 534.00 Hüggel, berge

== Hills ==
Among the most important high points in the Osnabruck Uplands are the following – sorted by height in metres (m) above sea level (NHN):

- Hesterbrink (Moselerberg; ca. 232,5 m), highest point in Melle
- Holzhauser Berg (ca. 227 m), source of the River Hunte near Melle-Oldendorf
- Hüggel (226 m)
- Melle Hills (just under 220 m), eastern end of the uplands
- Moselerberg (207.5 m),
- Oldendorfer Berg (203.2 m) with the Melle Observatory in Melle-Oberholsten
- Westerhauser Berg (192.5 m)
- Holter Berg (190.1 m) with Holt Castle
- Piesberg (188 m) with the Museum of Industrial Culture (focal point: coal mining)
- Schafbergplatte (176.1 m) in Ibbenbüren, western end of the uplands
- Osterberg (173 m)
- Große Egge (166 m)
- Selberg (165.3 m)
- Großer Zuschlag (154.9 m)
- Im Kassel (153 m)
- Werscher Berg (148 m)
- Lechtenbrink (146 m)
- Harderberg (145.2 m)
- Hengelsberg (145.2 m)
- Dingelrott (141.2 m)
- Wellinger Berg (136 m)
- Halterdaren (134.3 m)
- Halter Berg (127.5 m)
- Gattberg (127.1 m) with the Steinernes Meer Nature Reserve
- Schölerberg (126) with Osnabrück Zoo
- Alt-Schlederhauser Berg (124.8 m)
- Schinkelberg (123.1 m) with the Schinkel Tower
- Haster Berg (121 m)
- Kleeberg (119.7 m)
- Hanfelder Hügel (115.5) with the Wittekindsburg

== Literature ==
- Roman-Germanic Central Museum, Mainz (publ.): Führer zu vor- und frühgeschichtlichen Denkmälern – Das Osnabrücker Land I, Vol. 42, Verlag Philipp von Zabern, Mainz, 1979, ISBN 3-8053-0311-4
