= Amelungsburg =

Amelungsburg is the name of two Iron Age circular rampart sites in the Weser Uplands of Germany. The two sites are only 30 kilometres apart and are intervisible.

- Amelungsburg (Süntel)
- Amelungsburg (Lippe Uplands)
