= Dören =

Low German term for a hill pass

Dören (or Döhren, pronounced [ˈdøːʁən], singular: Döre [ˈdøːʁə]) is the name given to passes through a range of hills in the Low German language area, especially Ostwestfalen-Lippe. The origin of the term goes back to the Low German word Dör ("door"). Dören thus separate two hill ridges, which in East Westphalia (Ostwestfalen) are often known as Eggen. A typical Döre is the Wallücke. The Dören Gorge between Pivitsheide V. L. and Augustdorf in the Teutoburg Forest also bears this name.

Smaller, wet or stream-filled V-shaped valleys, through which no pass leads, are known as Siepen or Siefen in Low German as well as in the Middle High German dialect area, for example, in the Süder Uplands. The related term of Siek from the East Westphalian-Lippe area means a wet 'box valley' (Kastental, a valley with wide bottom flanked by steep rock faces), that has arisen through Plaggen extraction (a form of peat cutting) and ash cultivation.

== Places with the name ==
- Dörentrup, village in the county of Lippe
- Dörenberg (331.2 m), hill in the county of Osnabrück
- Dörenberg (Lippe Uplands) (392.5 m), hill between Dörentrup and Extertal
