= Melle Hills =

Small hill range in Germany

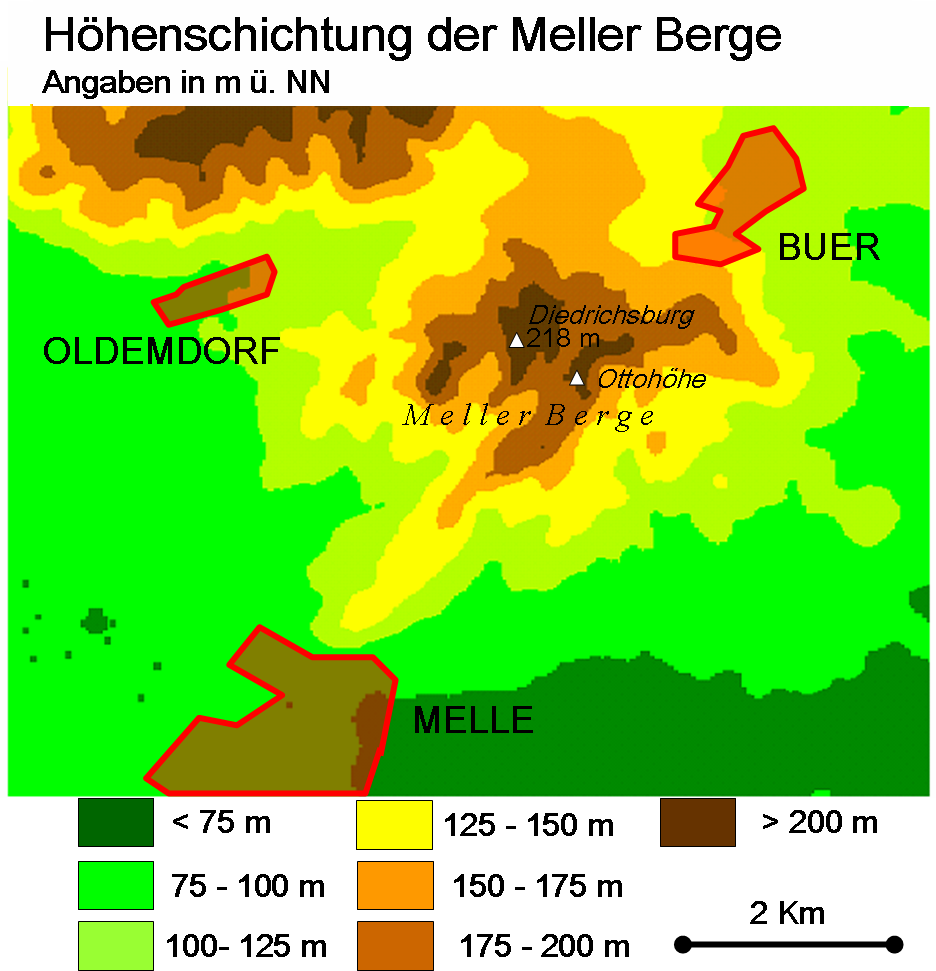
- Relief map of the Melle Hills

Highest point
- Peak: Adolfsberg
- Elevation: 220 m (720 ft)

Dimensions
- Length: 5 km (3.1 mi)

Geography
- Location: Lower Saxony
- Range coordinates: 52°14′00.06″N 8°21′42.012″E
- Parent range: Osnabrück Uplands

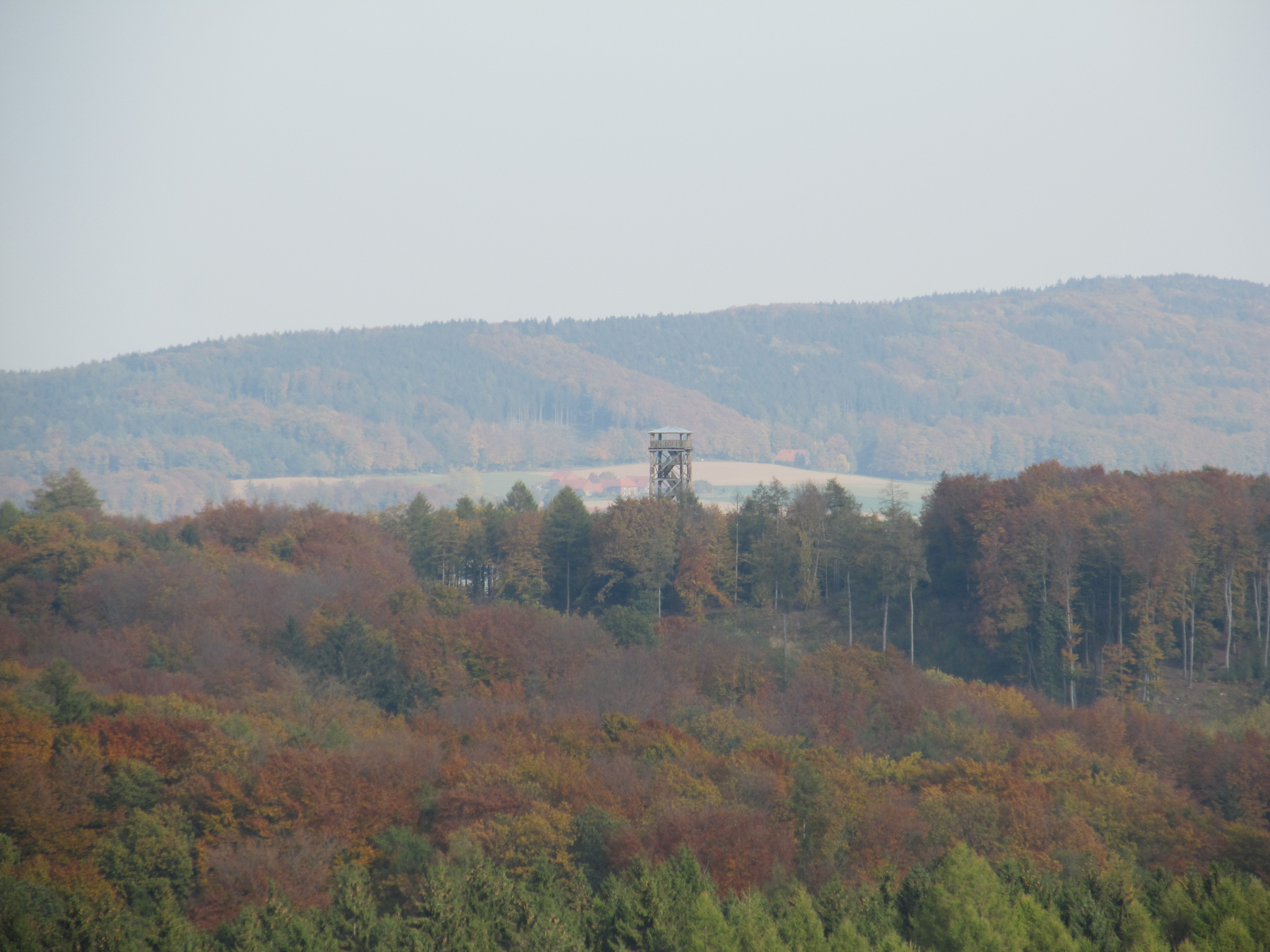
View from the Melle Hills looking northeast over the Friedenshöhe observation tower to the Großer Kellenberg

The Meller Hills (German: Meller Berge or Meller Berg) are a small hill range up to a maximum of about 220 m above sea level (NHN) high in the Osnabrück Uplands. They are located in the borough of Melle in the Lower Saxon county of Osnabrück in Germany.

== Geography ==
=== Location ===
Parts of the TERRA.vita Nature Park are located on the Melle Hills. Although they rise around 6 kilometres south of the main ridge of the Wiehen Hills, they are sometimes included as part of the latter. The small hill range lies between the town of Melle to the south, the villages of Bakum in the southwest, and Eicken-Bruche to the south-southeast, the Mell suburb of Buer to the northeast with its villages Barkhausen to the east and Holzhausen to the north and the Melle suburb of Oldendorf to the west; to the north-northwest lies the Melle estate of Gut Ostenwalde. Most of it is drained by the southwest flowing Zwickenbach, whose water flows via the Else and Werre eastwards to the Weser.

=== Natural regions ===
The Melle Hills belong to the major unit group of the Lower Weser Uplands (No. 53), the major unit of the Osnabrück Uplands (535), the sub-unit of Northern Osnabrück Uplands (535.0) and the natural region of the Melle Heights (535.03). The landscape leads west to northwest into the natural area Schledehauser Hügelland (535.02). To the south it leads into the natural region of the Else Depression (531.10), which belongs to the subunit of the Else-Werre-Valley (531.1), and to the east into the natural region of the Quernheim Hills (531.01) and to the north in the natural area of the Meesdorf Heights (531.00), both of which belong to the major unit of the Ravensberg Hills (531) and subunit of Quernheim Hill Country (531.0).

=== Surveys ===
The elevations of the Melle Hills include - sorted by height in metres (m) above NHN:

- Adolfsberg ( 220 m, south-south-west summit; 215 m, north-north-east summit)
- Diedrichsberg (219 m); with the Diedrichsburg
- Eickener Egge ( 207.5 m); with Ottoshöhe observation tower
- Stuckenberg ( 207.5 m); with Friedenshöhe observation tower

== Nature reserves and protected landscapes ==
The contiguous forest of the Melle Hills covers around 8 km^{2}. Parts of the "Wiehen Hills and Northern Osnabrück Uplands" (CDDA - No. 390425; 2009 designated; 288,348 km^{2}).

== Tourism ==
On the Melle Hills is the castle of Diedrichsburg. In the north of the hill range lies the 2 km^{2} large and enclosed Diedrichsburg Wildlife Park, which was founded in 1963. It has a large population of semi-wild wild boars. It is particularly popular with tourists in spring when there are numerous newcomers to the park. On the Friedenshöhe, a subpeak of the Stuckenberg near Buer is the 28.6-metre-high Friedenshöhe observation tower, which was built in 1988 and which has been expanded into the Klimaturm. On the Ottoshöhe, a hill on the Eickener Egge near the centre of Melle, there is a 28.5 metre- high observation tower.

In addition, the Melle Hills have been made accessible as a local recreation area by the establishment of several hikers' car parks and various regional hiking trails. After its redesign, the TERRA.track called the Zwickenbach Valley Nature Trail ("Naturerlebnispfad Zwickenbachtal") has become a popular destination.

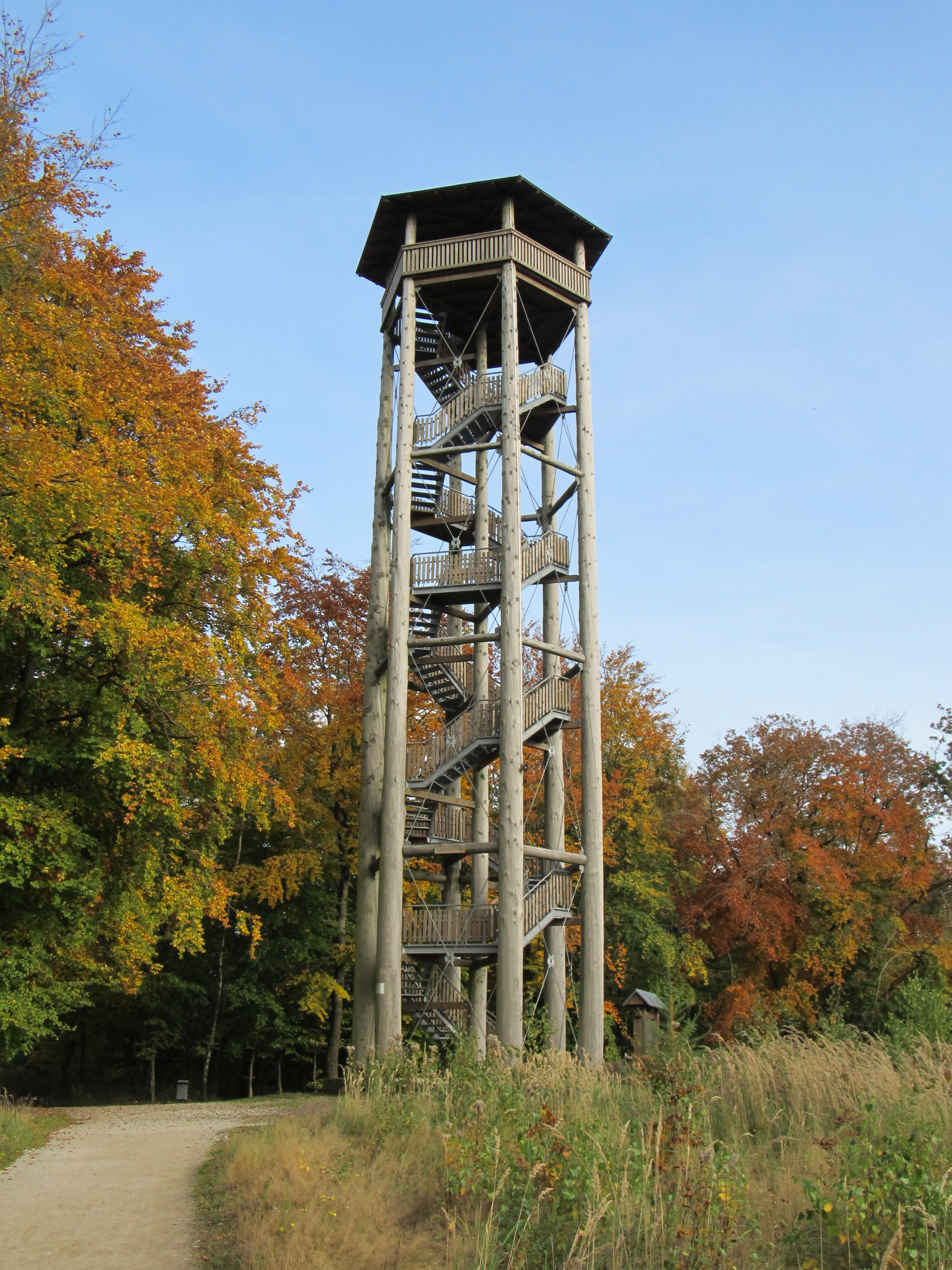
Ottoshöhe Observation Tower on the Eickener Egge

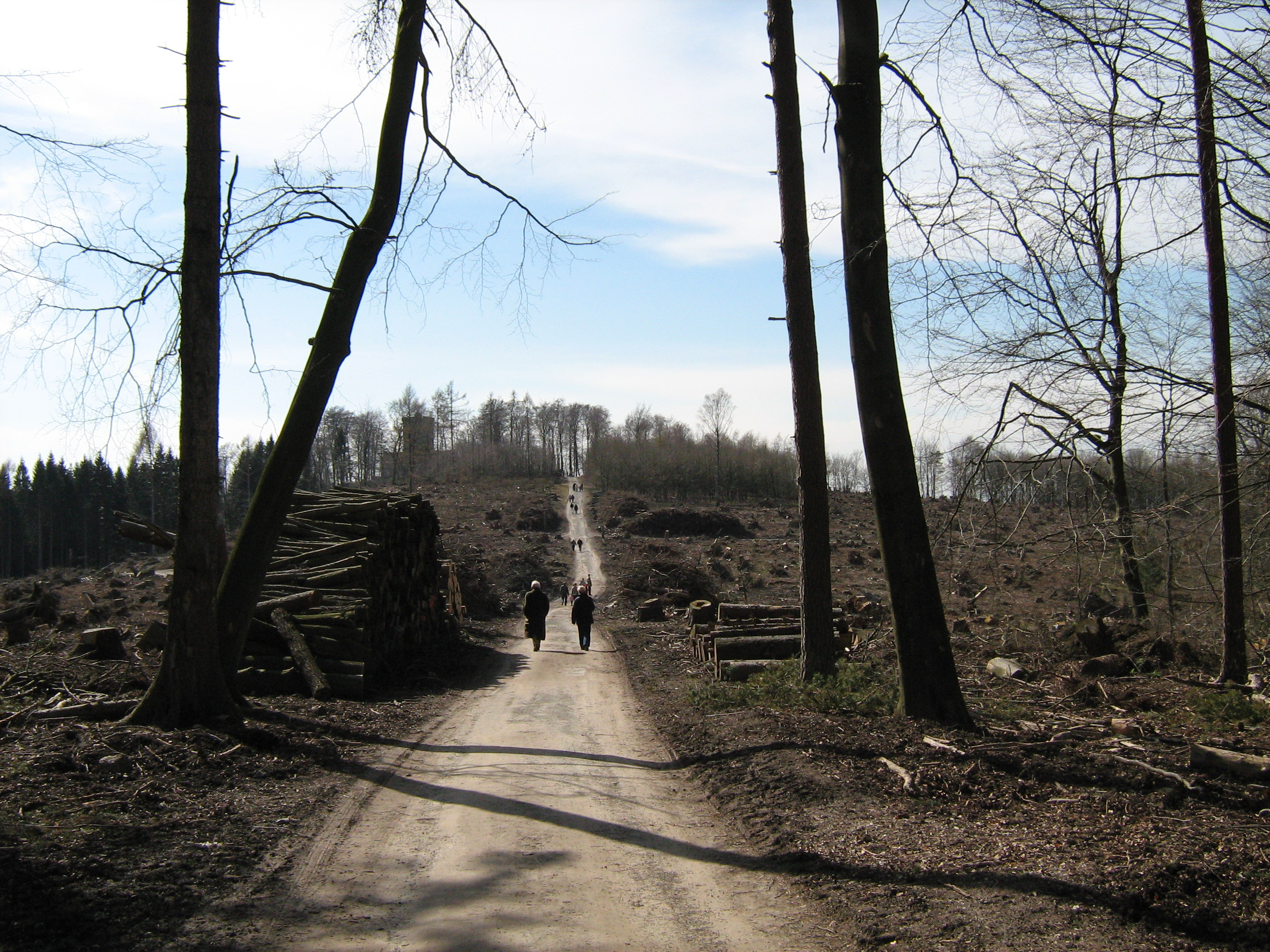
View of the Diedrichsburg (2008)

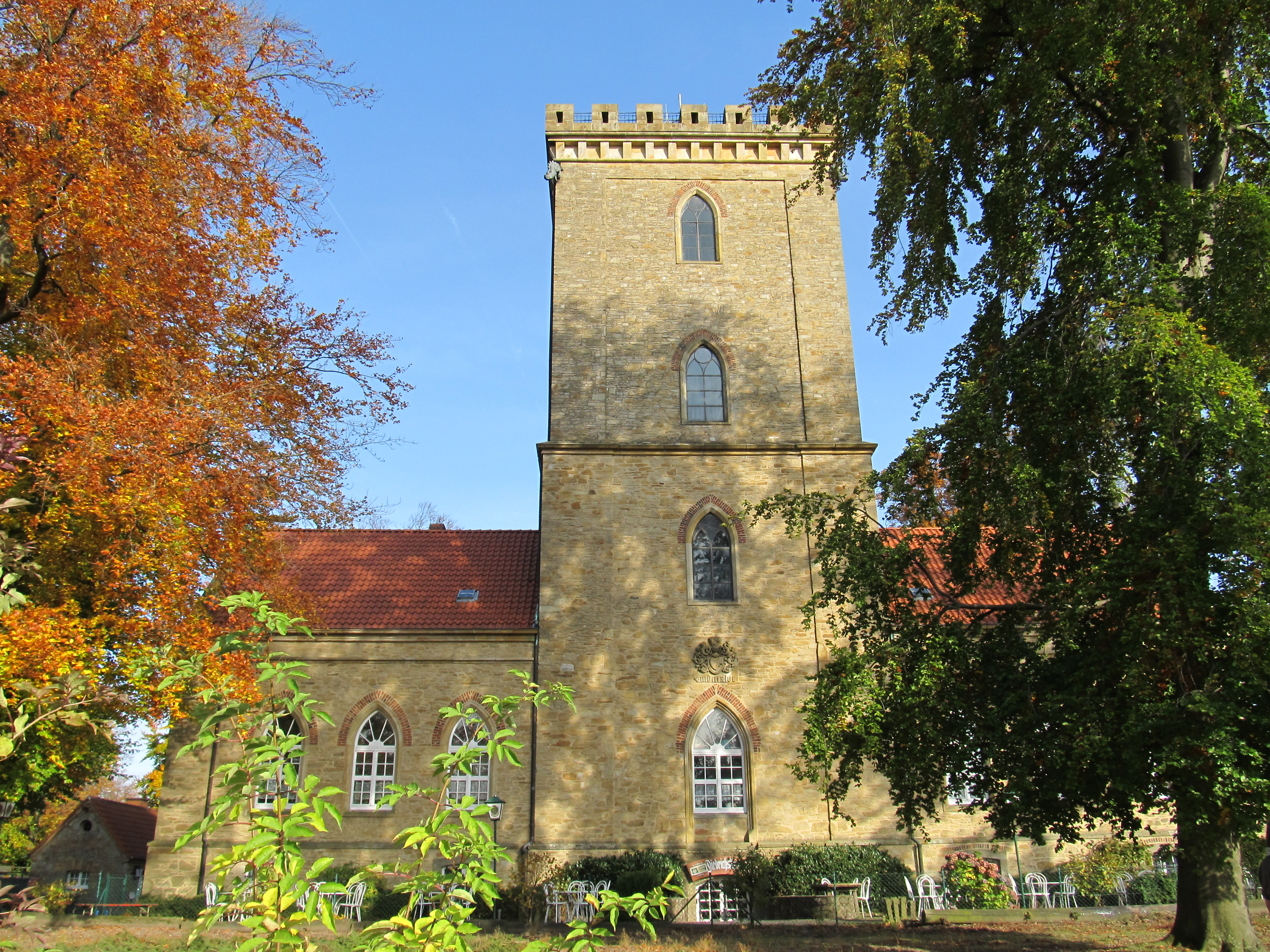
The Diedrichsburg
