= Reinhard Libuda =

German footballer (1943–1996)

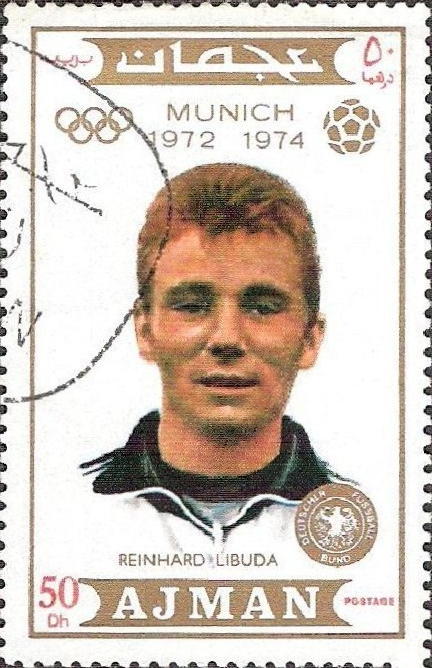
- Libuda in 1971

Personal information
- Date of birth: 10 October 1943
- Place of birth: Wendlinghausen, Germany
- Date of death: 25 August 1996 (aged 52)
- Place of death: Gelsenkirchen, Germany
- Height: 1.75 m (5 ft 9 in)
- Position: Forward

Youth career
- –1954: Rot-Weiß Bismarck
- 1954–1961: Schalke 04

Senior career*
Years	Team	Apps	(Gls)
1961–1965	Schalke 04	76	(15)
1965–1968	Borussia Dortmund	74	(8)
1968–1972	Schalke 04	124	(13)
1972–1973	Strasbourg	15	(3)
1973–1976	Schalke 04	15	(0)
Total		304	(39)

International career
1964–1966	West Germany U-23	2	(0)
1963–1971	West Germany	26	(3)
Medal record
Men's football
Representing West Germany
FIFA World Cup
Third place	1970 Mexico
- * Club domestic league appearances and goals

Reinhard "Stan" Libuda (10 October 1943 – 25 August 1996) was a German footballer playing on the right wing.

== Career ==
Libuda was born in Wendlinghausen near Lemgo. His tremendous skill as a dribbler was a major factor in Borussia Dortmund's 1966 UEFA Cup Winners' Cup championship and the West Germany national team's hard-won qualification and its third-place finish in the 1970 FIFA World Cup. In the UEFA Cup Winners' Cup Final in 1966 he scored the final goal against Liverpool F.C. to earn a 2–1 extra time victory for Dortmund.

Libuda played for FC Schalke 04 from 1961 until 1976 with two interruptions: from 1965 until 1968 he played for Borussia Dortmund, and 1972–73 for RC Strasbourg.

Between 1963 and 1971, Libuda gained 26 caps for the West Germany national team and scored three goals. In the German Bundesliga he played 264 games and scored 28 goals for FC Schalke 04 and Borussia Dortmund.

Later he was involved in the Bundesligaskandal of 1971. The shy Libuda later suffered from cancer, and died from the complications of a stroke in Gelsenkirchen.

Libuda gained his nickname "Stan" after the English player Stanley Matthews who played in the same position and who was widely praised for his dribbling skills. Fans of Schalke used a 1960s slogan of a German Evangelical Church Assembly Nobody can get past God to expand it with – except Stan Libuda. The slogan is part of a musical made about Schalke.

== Career statistics ==
=== Club ===
Appearances and goals by club, season and competition
Club	Season	League			DFB-Pokal		West G. Cup		Europe		Total	
Club	Season	Division	Apps	Goals	Apps	Goals	Apps	Goals	Apps	Goals	Apps	Goals
Schalke 04	1961–62	Oberliga West	0	0	3	0	—		—		3	0
Schalke 04	1962–63	Oberliga West	25	8	1	1	4	2	—		30	11
Schalke 04	1963–64	Bundesliga	27	4	2	0	—		—		29	4
Schalke 04	1964–65	Bundesliga	24	3	3	0	—		—		27	3
Schalke 04	Total		76	15	9	1	4	2	—		89	18
Borussia Dortmund	1965–66	Bundesliga	30	3	0	0	—		9	1	39	4
Borussia Dortmund	1966–67	Bundesliga	22	2	0	0	—		1	0	23	2
Borussia Dortmund	1967–68	Bundesliga	22	3	1	1	—		—		23	4
Borussia Dortmund	Total		74	8	1	1	—		10	1	85	10
Schalke 04	1968–69	Bundesliga	32	5	5	0	—		—		37	5
Schalke 04	1969–70	Bundesliga	31	0	3	2	—		7	3	41	5
Schalke 04	1970–71	Bundesliga	31	5	5	1	—		—		36	6
Schalke 04	1971–72	Bundesliga	30	3	9	0	—		—		39	3
Schalke 04	Total		124	13	22	3	—		7	3	153	19
Strasbourg	1972–73	Ligue 1	15	3	0	0	—		—		15	3
Schalke 04	1973–74	Bundesliga	10	0	0	0	—		—		10	0
Schalke 04	1974–75	Bundesliga	5	0	1	0	—		—		6	0
Schalke 04	1975–76	Bundesliga	0	0	0	0	—		—		0	0
Schalke 04	Total		15	0	1	0	—		—		16	0
Schalke 04 total			215	28	32	4	4	2	7	3	258	37
Career total			304	39	33	5	4	2	17	4	358	50

=== International ===
Appearances and goals by national team and year
National team	Year	Apps	Goals
Germany	1963	3	0
Germany	1964	3	0
Germany	1965	1	0
Germany	1966	0	0
Germany	1967	2	1
Germany	1968	0	0
Germany	1969	4	1
Germany	1970	11	1
Germany	1971	2	0
Total		26	3

== Honours ==
Borussia Dortmund

- UEFA Cup Winners' Cup: 1965–66

Schalke 04

- DFB-Pokal: 1971–72

West Germany

- FIFA World Cup third place: 1970
