= Börstelbach =

River in Germany

Location
- Country: Germany
- State: North Rhine-Westphalia

Physical characteristics
- Mouth
  - location: Werre
  - coordinates: 52.2064°N 8.7439°E
- Length: 1.2 km (0.75 mi)

Basin features
- Progression: Werre→ Weser→ North Sea

Börstelbach is a river of North Rhine-Westphalia, Germany. It is 1.2 km long and a left tributary of the Werre. The spring is near by Mennighüffen. It dewaters a small section of the Ravensberg Basin.

== See also ==
- List of rivers of North Rhine-Westphalia
