= Siepen =

Type of valley in Germany

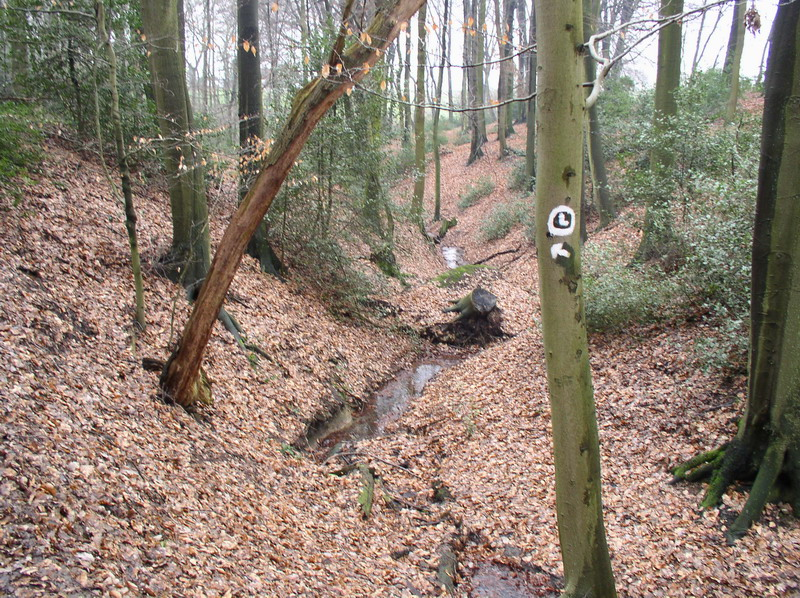
A typical Central Upland siepen/siefen

Siepen, Siefen, Seifen or Seipen are typical regional words used in northwestern Germany for what are often narrow, wet, ravine-like V-shaped valleys of the German Central Uplands with their small headstreams. In the south German region, such valley forms are usually called Klingen.

These words often form a part of placenames especially in the area from the central and southern Ruhrgebiet southwards as far as southern Westphalia (Sauerland), as well as in the adjacent regions of Bergisches Land, Siegerland and southern Rhineland. In North Hesse the term is found in the old Lower Saxon dialect area in the counties of Waldeck-Frankenberg to Korbach and Bad Arolsen.

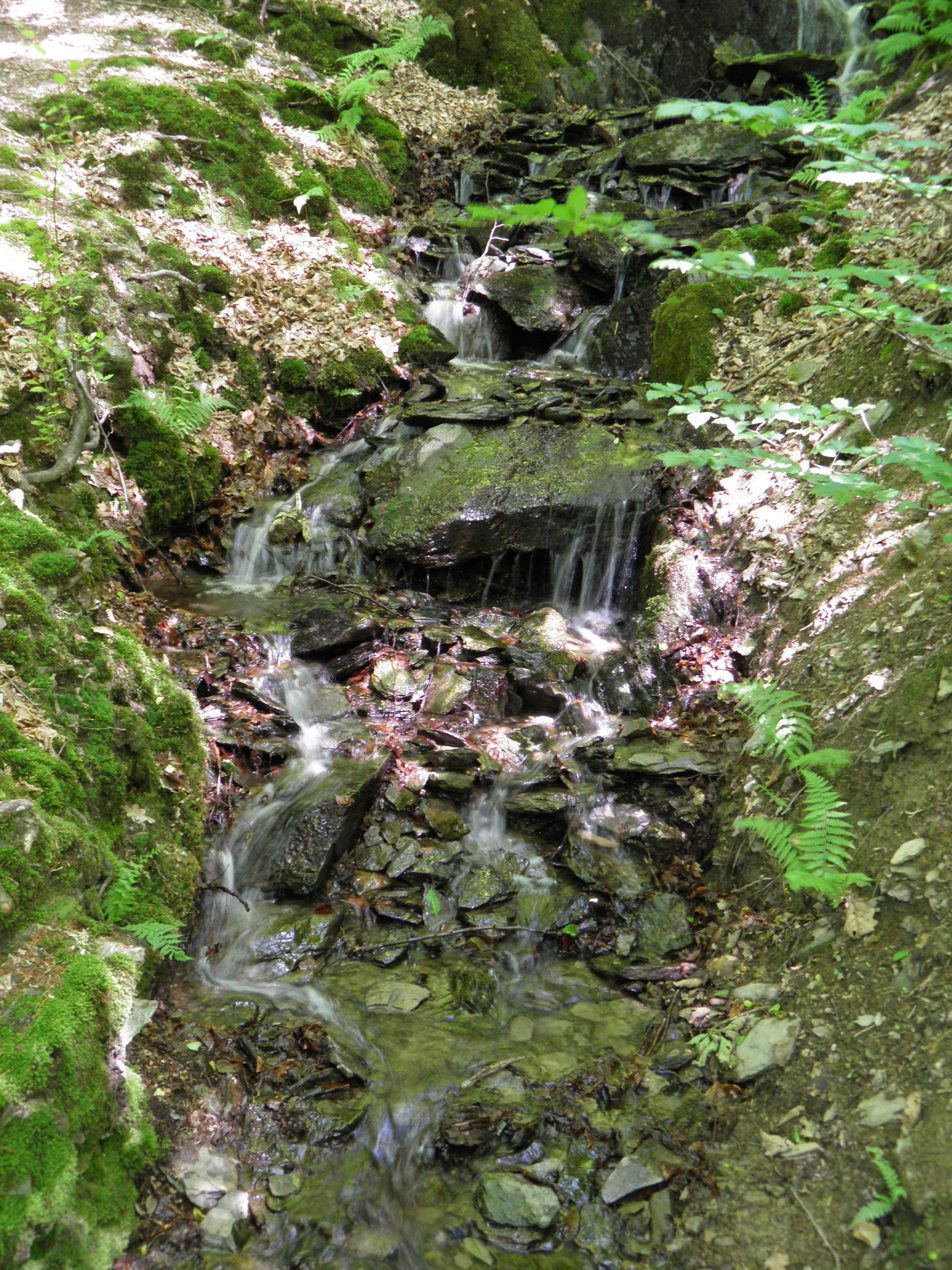
Siepen in Bergisches Land (Remscheid) on a rocky northern hillside

The word is derived from the Middle Low German word sîpe "wet depression" or "little stream, brook", the verb sîpen means "trickle, drip". Grammatically siepen has a neuter or masculine gender.

The word forms Siefen and Seif are common in the Franconian and Hessian region. The form -siepen (with a p) as part of the name of waterbodies or places is, by contrast, mainly found in the northern Bergisches Land as far as south Westphalia. The difference in spelling reflects dialect differences which arose as a result of a strong phonetic shift; the region in which this occurs is where the dialect boundary of the so-called Rhenish Fan runs.

The headstreams in the valley do not carry water all year round; but have nonetheless carved out the V-shaped valley. In the post-glacial period the quantities of water flowing out of the Central Uplands were greater, so that the streams were able to cut down more strongly into the terrain than they are today.

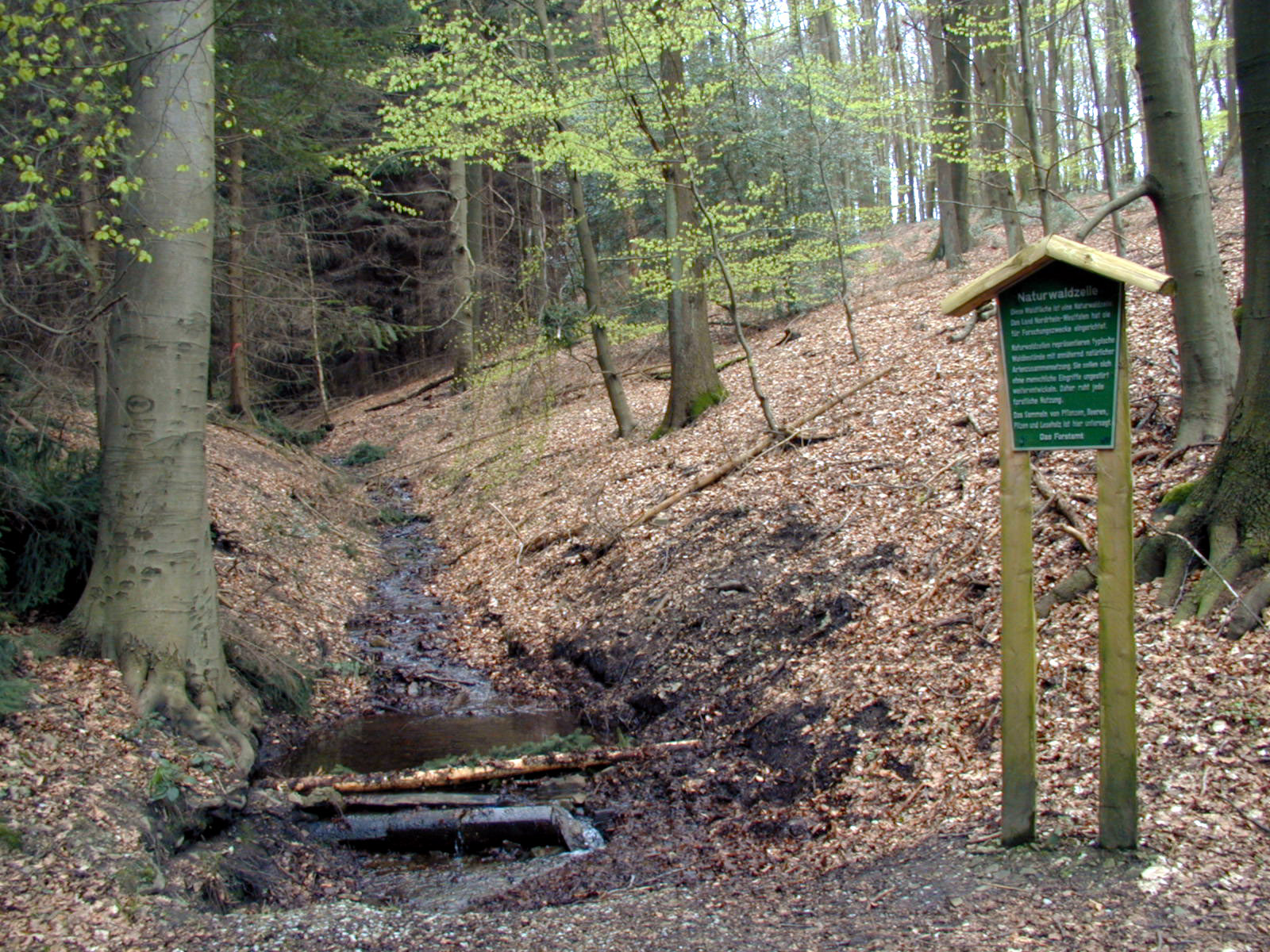
The Meersiepen in the Burgholz State Forest esat of the Wupper

The word also refers to the wet meadow valleys which result, with their steep hillsides. The name of the Siebengebirge hills may possibly have the root Siepen. In the Solinger Platt dialect the word siepenaat means "completely wet through".

In East Westphalian Ravensberger Land and in Lipperland such landforms are known as Sieks. But after land amelioration for agriculture, they usually have a trough-shape today. It is possible that there is an etymological relationship between the Middle Low German term for a similar fluvial landform, sike, and the word Siepen.
