= Hüggel =

Ridge in the Lower Saxon district of Osnabrück in central Germany

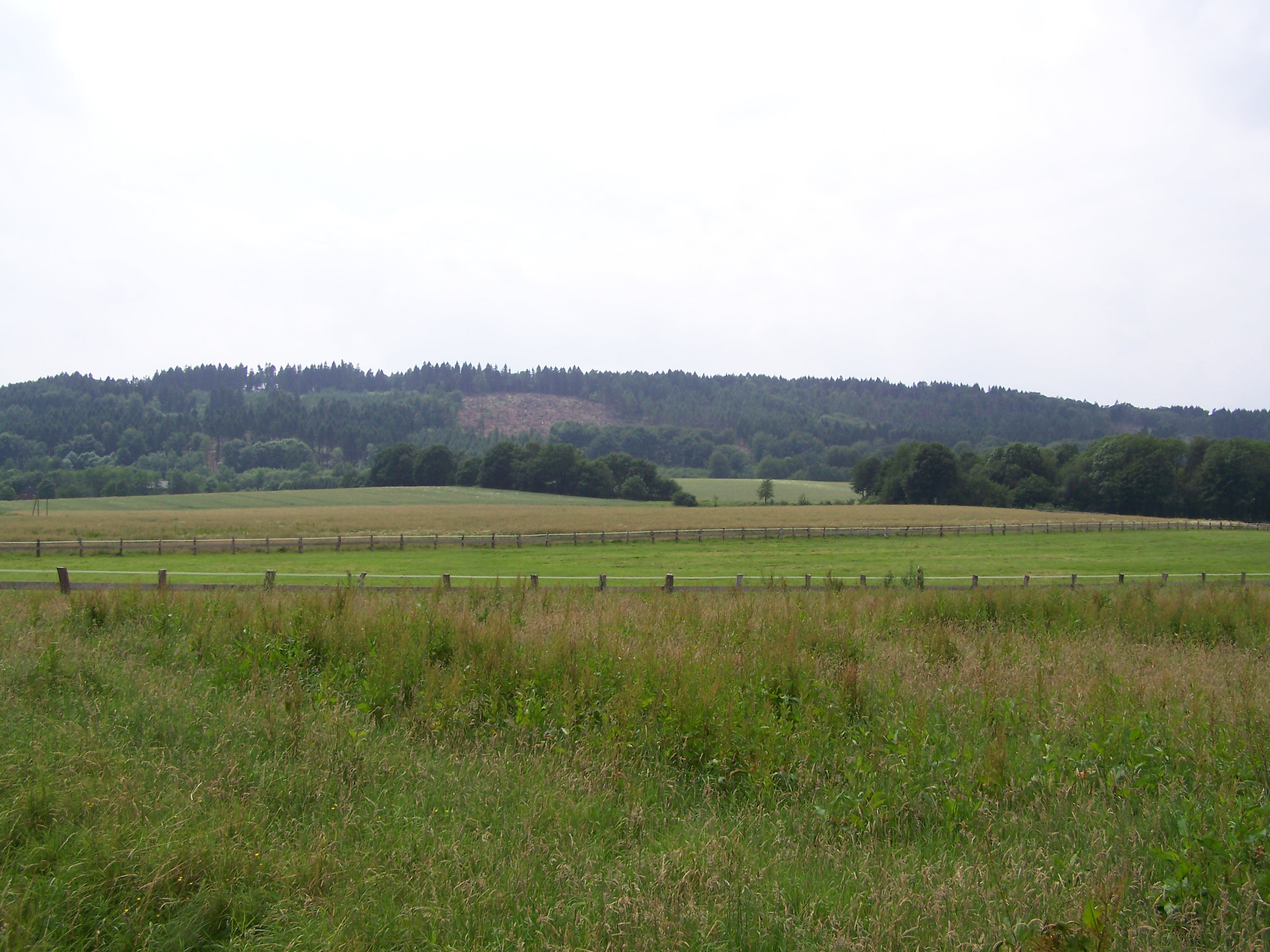
- The Hüggel with woods devastated by Hurricane Kyrill

Highest point
- Elevation: 225.6 m above sea level (NN) (740 ft)
- Coordinates: 52°13′24″N 7°58′09″E

Geography
- Location within Lower Saxony
- Location: Hasbergen, Lower Saxony, Germany (Part of the Ibbenbüren Coalfield and Osnabrück Uplands)

The Hüggel is a ridge, up to 225.6 m above sea level (NN), about 5 kilometres long and 1 kilometre wide, near Hasbergen in the Lower Saxon district of Osnabrück in central Germany. It is the highest point of the Osnabrück Uplands. This Upper Carboniferous outcrop is part of the Ibbenbüren Coalfield.

== Hills ==
Amongst the elevations in the Hüggel and its foothills − sorted by height in metres (m) above sea level (NN) - are the:

- Hüggel (225.6 m)
- Kleiner Hüggel (ca. 200 m)
- Heidhornberg (180.2 m)
- Silberberg (179.8 m)
- Jägerberg (176.0 m)
- Heidberg (165.1 m)
- Domprobst Sundern (157.6 m)
- Bükersberg (152.6 m)
- Martiniberg (125.1 m)
- Ortenbrick (120.5 m)
- Steinbrink (118.0 m)
- Roter Berg (108.0 m)
