= Siek (landform) =

Wet lowland

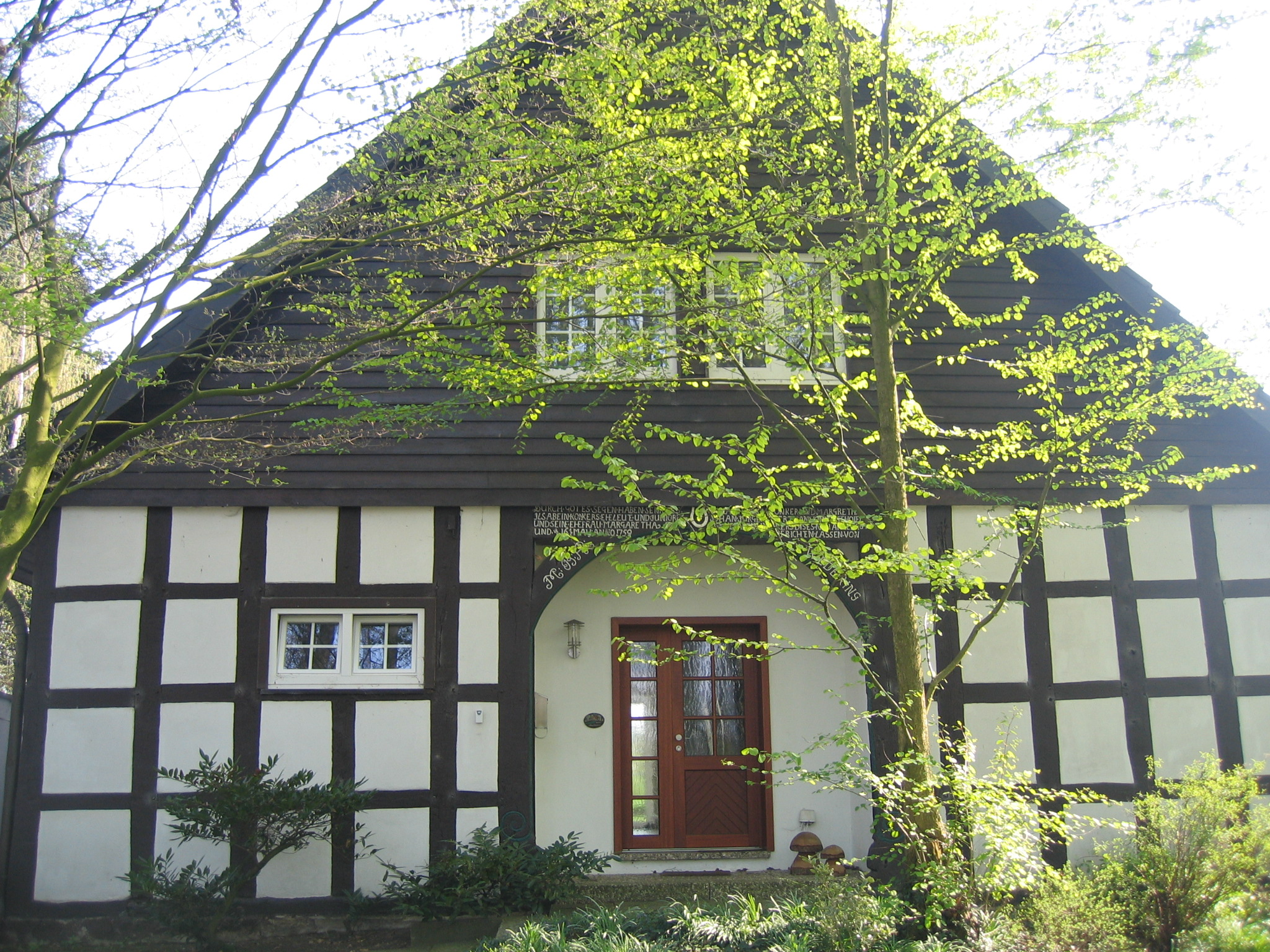
A siek in Bünde (52.210447°N 8.556805°E)

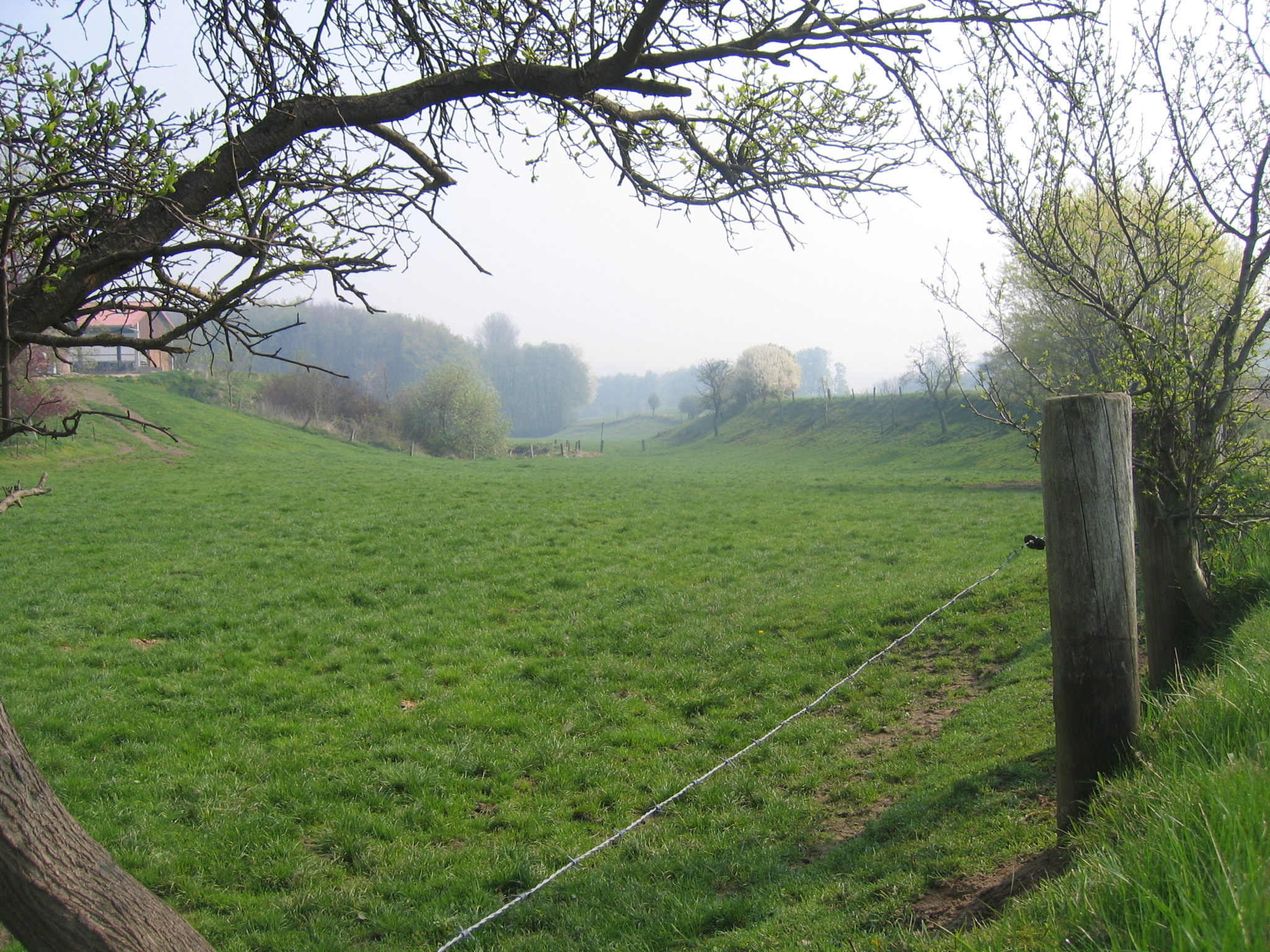
A siek in Ostkilver. Its steep sides are clearly recognisable. (52.229915°N 8.488955°E)

Siek (German pronunciation: [ziːk]) is a north German term for a wet depression, hollow or lowland area. It is mainly used to describe typical cultural landscape elements in eastern Westphalia, especially in the county of Lippe and in the region of Ravensberg Land. In East Westphalia "siek" is a very common component of the names of tracts of land, roads, places and even personal names, e.g. Heidsiek, Siekhorst, Im Siek, Siekmann and Sieker.

== Origins ==
The fertile loess soils in this region of north Germany are dissected by a host of brooks and headstreams, which used to flow in marshy V-shaped valleys. Not all Sieke are or were, however, crossed by a stream, but at the very least they always consisted of wet ground. During the course of medieval and early modern cultural and agricultural history, people developed these natural landforms by cutting into the edges of the V-shaped valleys (so-called Wiesenbrechen by Wiskenmaker) and turning them into trough and box valleys, and any streams were regulated such that they ran in straight beds along the edges of such a box valley. The aim of these measures was the create a wet grassland in the now broad, accessible stream meadows which could then be extensively cultivated. In addition the cut, grass sods or plaggen were able to be used to fertilise the surrounding fields (Plaggendüngung). In Ravensberg Land, sieke are generally narrow, trough valleys interspersed in the countryside and lying next to cultivated areas of slightly higher ground or kuppen (Plaggenesche), which were raised by the grass sod fertilisation.

== Importance today ==
Since, owing to the changed production conditions in modern agriculture, the grasslands in the sieken have become economically largely superfluous, many unused sieke would become marshy again in the long term without mowing and maintenance and turn into black alder carrs. Conservation and cultural landscape management today have the task of ensuring a balanced relationship between renaturalising sieken on the one hand and regularly mown grassland sieken on the other. An example of protected siek systems is the Kilverbach valley (52.228667°N 8.461318°E) and the Wöhrener Siek in Ravensberg Land.

== Siepen ==
Etymologically probably related and conceptually similar is the valley landform known as asiepen, which is mainly found in the south Westphalian area and generally also describes wet valley bottoms, mostly stream-bearing V-shaped valleys.

== Literature ==
- Florian Herzig: Vom Wert der feuchten Wiesen, Entstehung, Nutzung und Zerstörung der Sieke im Ravensberger Hügelland. In: Kreisheimatverein Herford (publ.), Kommunalarchiv Herford (publ.): Historisches Jahrbuch für den Kreis Herford 2005. Verlag für Regionalgeschichte. Bielefeld, 2004. ISBN 389534592X
