= Augustdorf =

- Town
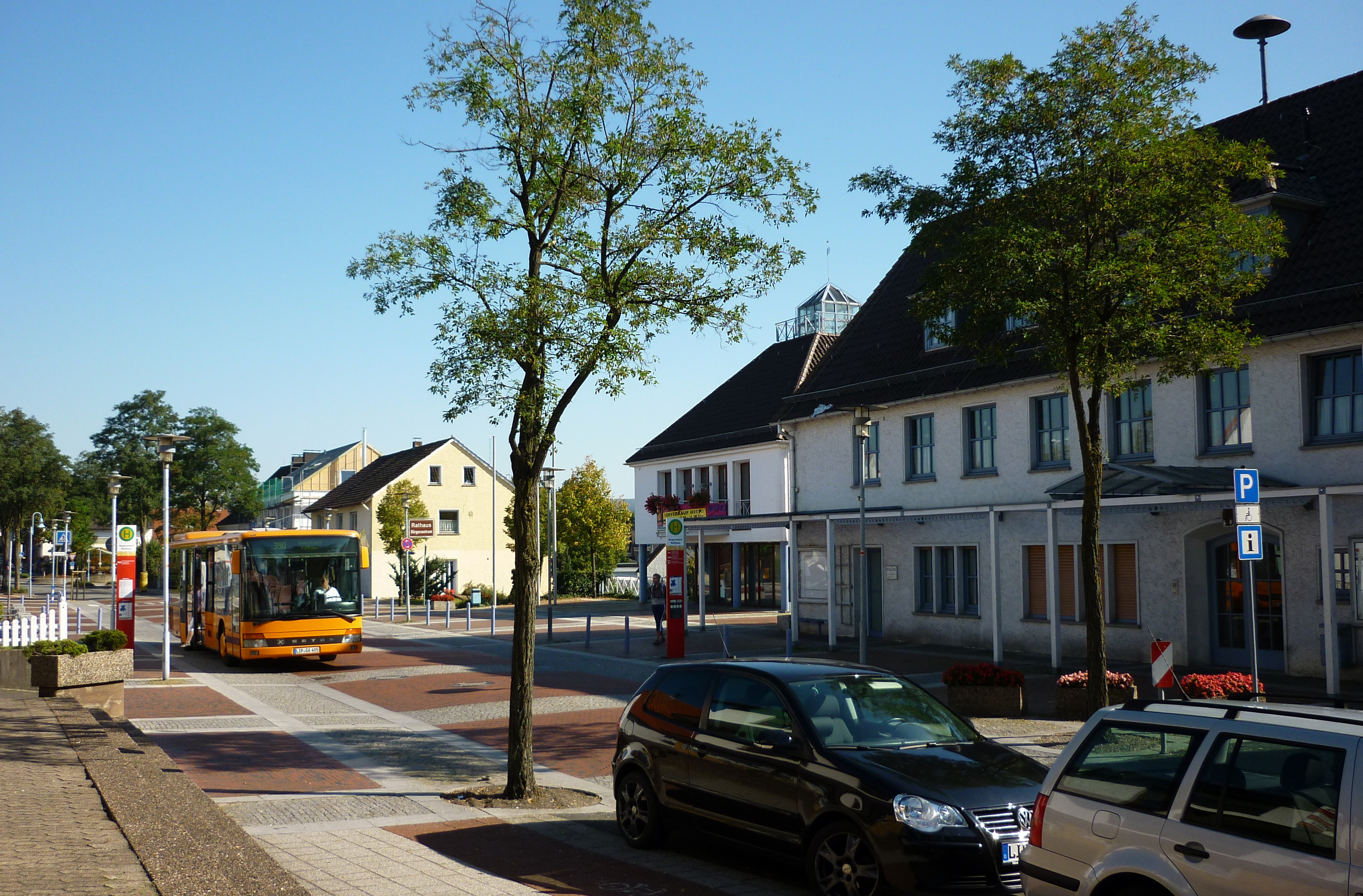
- Town centre of Augustdorf

- Flag Coat of arms

- Location of Augustdorf within Lippe district
- Interactive map of Augustdorf
- Location within Germany Location within North Rhine-Westphalia
- Coordinates: 51°54′N 08°44′E
- Country: Germany
- State: North Rhine-Westphalia
- Admin. region: Detmold
- District: Lippe

Government
  - Mayor (2025–30): Andreas Wulf (Ind.)

Area
  - Total: 42.18 km^{2} (16.29 sq mi)
- Elevation: 179 m (587 ft)

Population (2025-12-31)
  - Total: 9,690
  - Density: 230/km^{2} (595/sq mi)
- Time zone: UTC+01:00 (CET)
  - Summer (DST): UTC+02:00 (CEST)
- Postal codes: 32832
- Dialling codes: 05237
- Vehicle registration: LIP
- Website: www.augustdorf.de

Augustdorf (German pronunciation: [ˈaʊɡʊstˌdɔʁf]) is a municipality in the Lippe district of North Rhine-Westphalia, Germany. It has an area of 42.18 km^{2} and about 9,700 inhabitants (2025).

== History ==
In 1775 Simon August, Count of Lippe-Detmold issued a writ of lease (Meierbrief) for the area of today's Augustdorf in favour of August Simon Struß, permitting him to establish a settlement (colony) at Dören hill. In 1779 the actual development plan for the settlement was decided, but the place hardly developed. In 1780 the settlement at Dören consisted of only four tiny thatched huts. In 1789 the settlement was named in honour of Count Simon August.

== Population ==
Historical population

Year	Pop.	±% p.a.
1965	5,768	—
1970	6,327	+1.87%
1975	6,593	+0.83%
1980	7,193	+1.76%
1985	6,845	−0.99%
1990	8,464	+4.34%
1995	9,607	+2.57%

Year	Pop.	±% p.a.
2000	10,120	+1.05%
2005	9,805	−0.63%
2010	9,583	−0.46%
2015	9,828	+0.51%
2020	10,147	+0.64%
2025	9,690	−0.92%

Source: Landesdatabank Nordrhein-Westfalen

== Politics ==
The current mayor is Andreas Wulf, an independent who won the 2025 runoff election against Mats Schubert of the SPD with 53.9% of votes.

=== City council ===
After the 2025 local elections, the Attendorn city council is composed as follows:

Party	Votes	%	+/-	Seats	+/-
Christian Democratic Union (CDU)	1,509	34.2	▼13.7	9	▼4
Social Democratic Party (SPD)	1,129	25.6	▼4.1	7	▼1
Alternative for Germany (AfD)	772	17.5	New	4	New
Departure C (AUFBRUCH C)	382	8.7	▲3.8	2	▲1
Democratic Citizens-Union Augustdorf (DBA)	313	7.1	New	2	New
Alliance 90/The Greens (Grüne)	196	4.4	New	1	New
Free Democratic Party (FDP)	110	2.5	▼2.6	1	±0
Valid votes	4,411	97.1			
Invalid votes	132	2.9			
Total	4,543	100.0		26	±0
Electorate/voter turnout	7,276	62.4			
Source: City of Augustdorf
