= Amelungsburg (Lippe Uplands) =

Hill in North Rhine-Westphalia, Germany

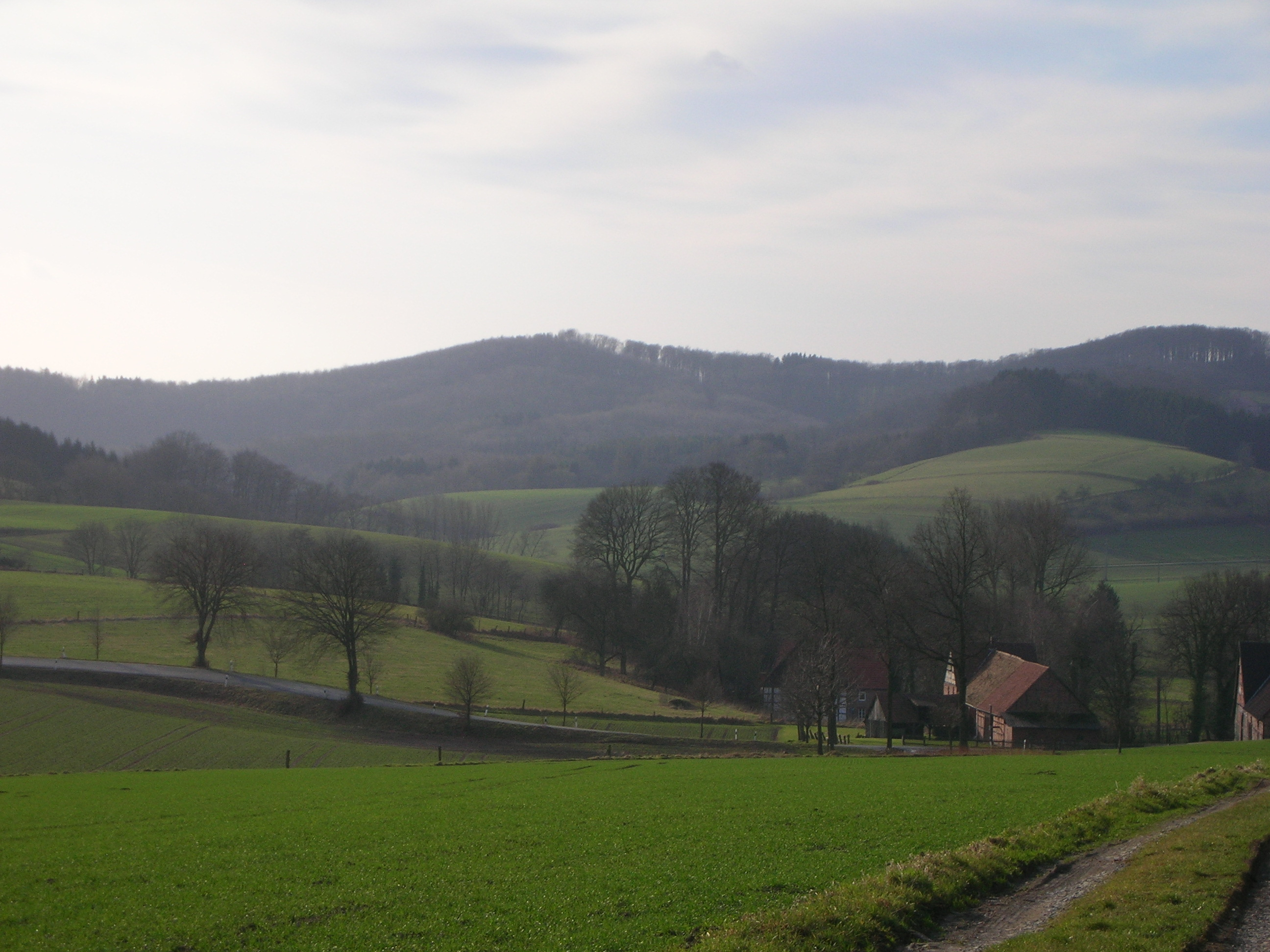
- Amelungsburg in the Lippe Uplands

Highest point
- Elevation: 292 m (958 ft)
- Coordinates: 52°02′52″N 8°59′03″E

Geography
- Location within North Rhine-Westphalia Location within Germany
- Location: North Rhine-Westphalia, Germany
- Parent range: Lippe Uplands

Geology
- Mountain type: Keuper

The Amelungsburg is a 292-metre (958 ft) high hill in the Lippe Uplands in central Germany, in the municipality of Dörentrup in the district of Lippe.

The Amelungsburg is believed to be the observation hill (Warthberg) belonging to the Piepenkopf rampart system located on its south-southwestern spur. Investigations into the charred remains (Brandfunde) at the site of the settlement with its double-embankment have been dated to 250 B.C. and can thus be presumed to have belonged to the La Tène culture. The settlement was not rebuilt.

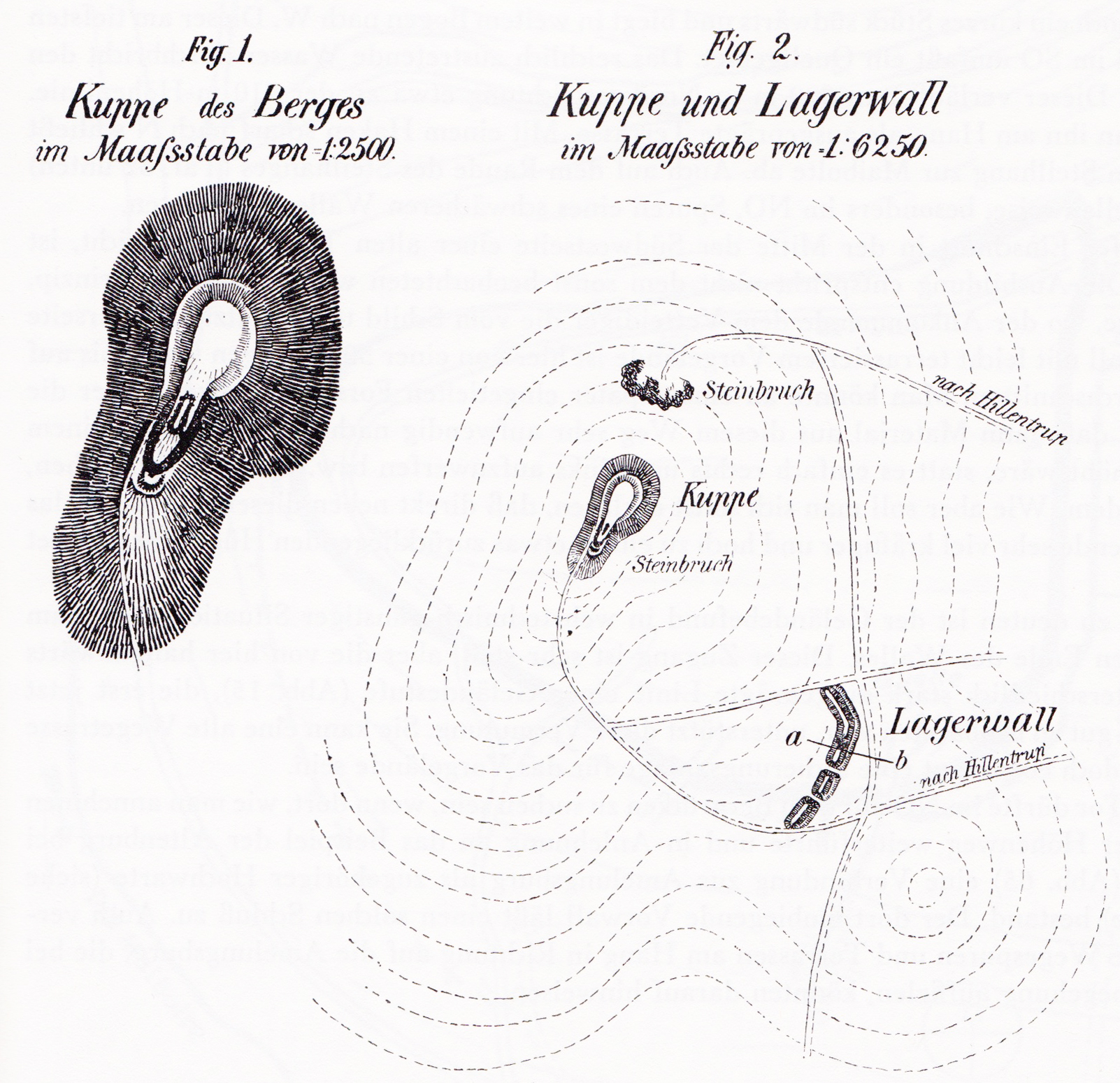
1878 plan of the Amelungsburg

At the southwestern foot of the Amelungsburg today is a still easily recognised, roughly 2-metre-high section of the ramparts with a 1.5-metre-deep ditch. It is suspected that this advanced rampart used to guard the road system.

In order to beat looters, the refuge castle has been investigated. Excavations on the plateau of the Amelungsburg unearthed about 300 individual items. In a number of spots there were both single and multiple hordes of goods.
