= Dörenberg =

Hill in Lower Saxony, Germany

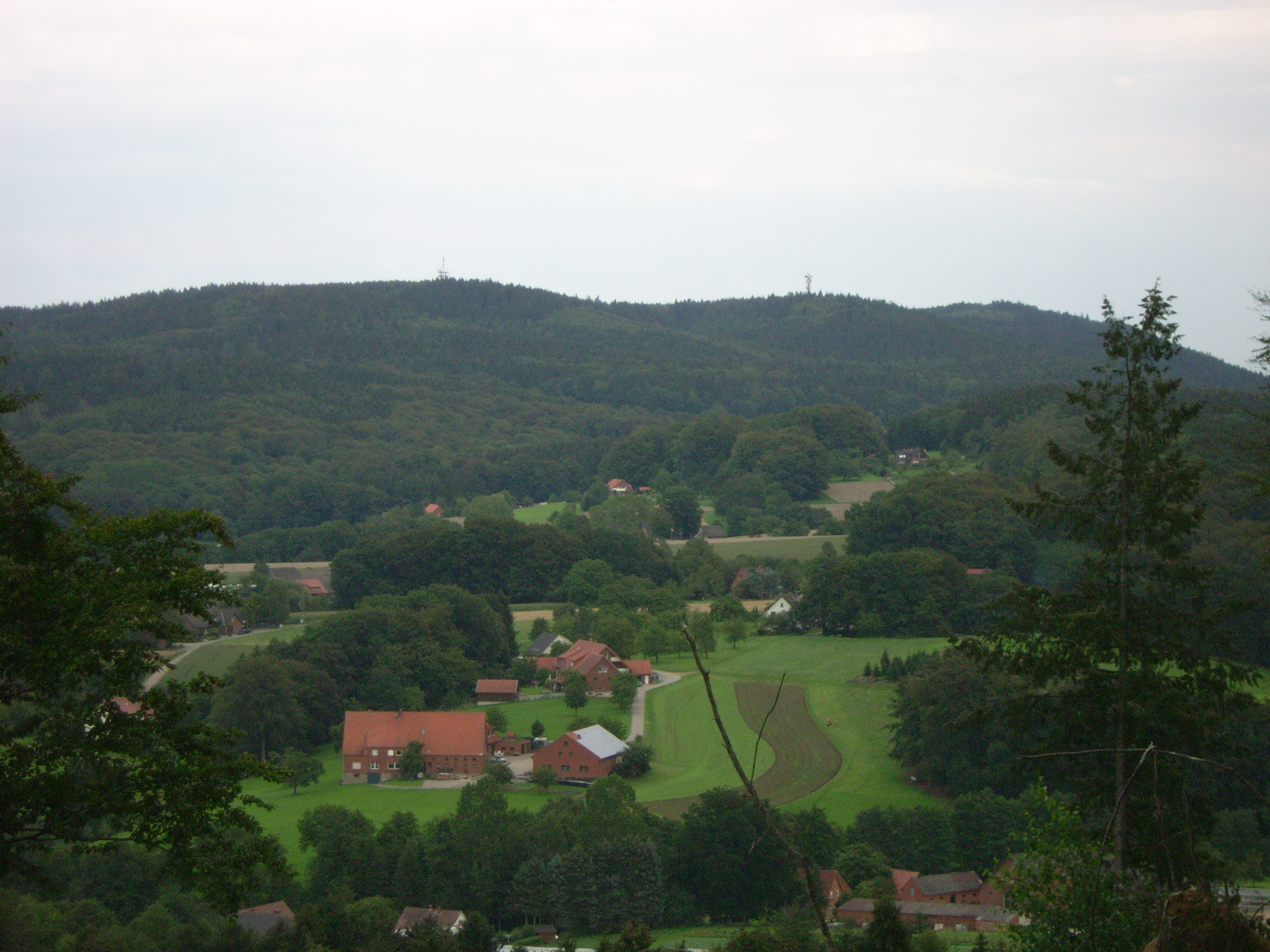
- The summit of Dörenberg

Highest point
- Elevation: 331.2 m (1,087 ft)
- Prominence: 210 m ↓ Bielefelder Pass
- Isolation: 50 km → Tönsberg
- Coordinates: 52°10′31″N 8°03′12″E

Geography
- Location within Lower Saxony
- Location: Lower Saxony, Germany
- Parent range: Teutoburg Forest

Geology
- Mountain type: Osning Sandstone

The Dörenberg (German pronunciation: [ˈdøːʁənbɛʁk]) is a hill, 331.2 m above sea level (NN), in the Teutoburg Forest in the district of Osnabrück, in the German state of Lower Saxony.

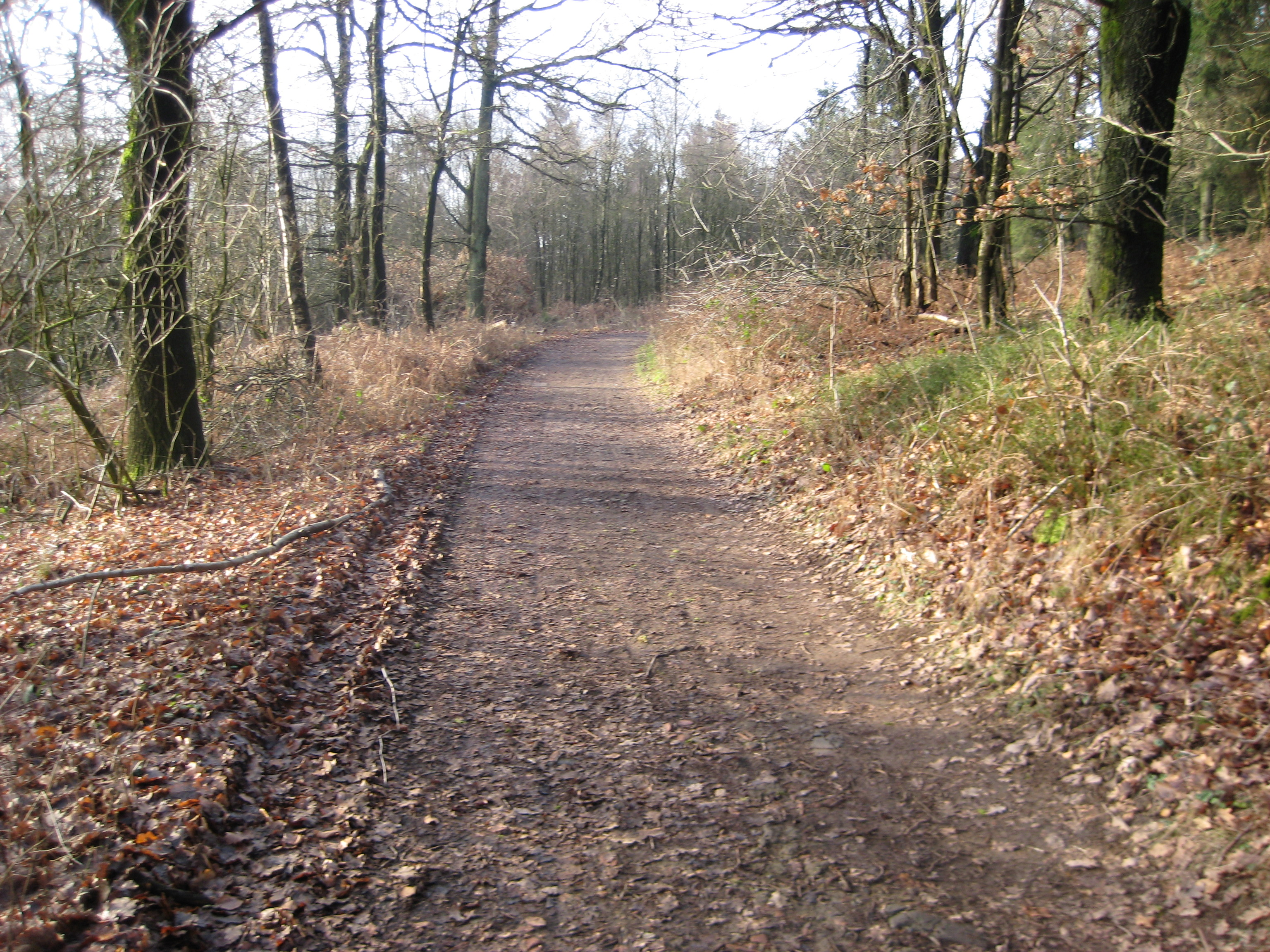
Hiking trail by the Hermann's Tower

== Origin of the name ==
Dören could be derived, especially in the area of Ostwestfalen-Lippe, from Dör, the Low German word for a hill or mountain pass.

== Location ==
The Dörenberg, the highest elevation in the centre section of the Teutoburg Forest, lies between Bad Iburg and the Georgsmarienhütte village of Oesede, whereby the boundary of both parishes runs over its southern flank, close to the summit. East of the hill, the B 51 runs between both settlements in roughly a north-northeast to south-southwest direction. The summit can be reached on woodland tracks from this road.

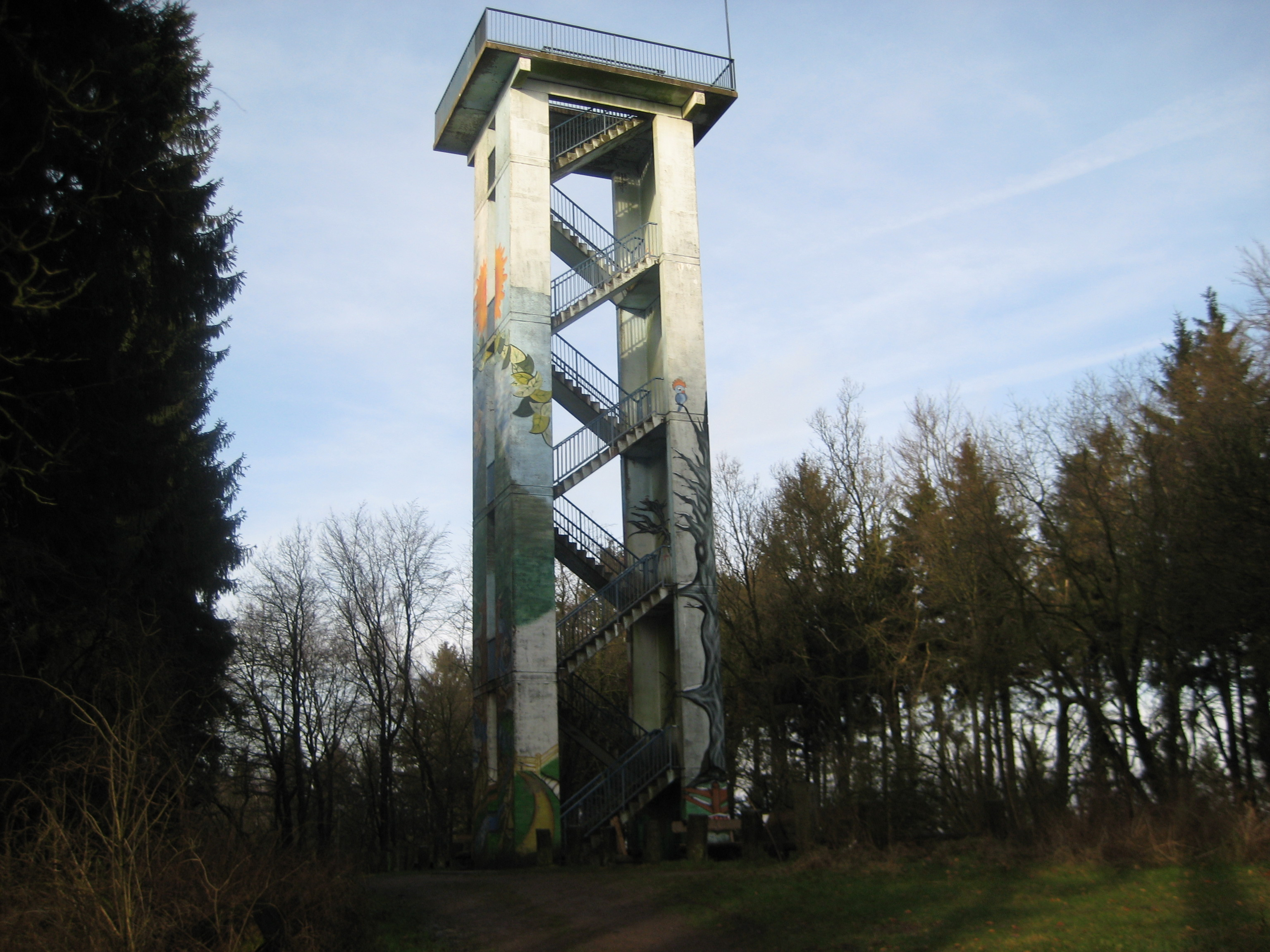
The Hermann's Tower

== Hermann's Tower ==
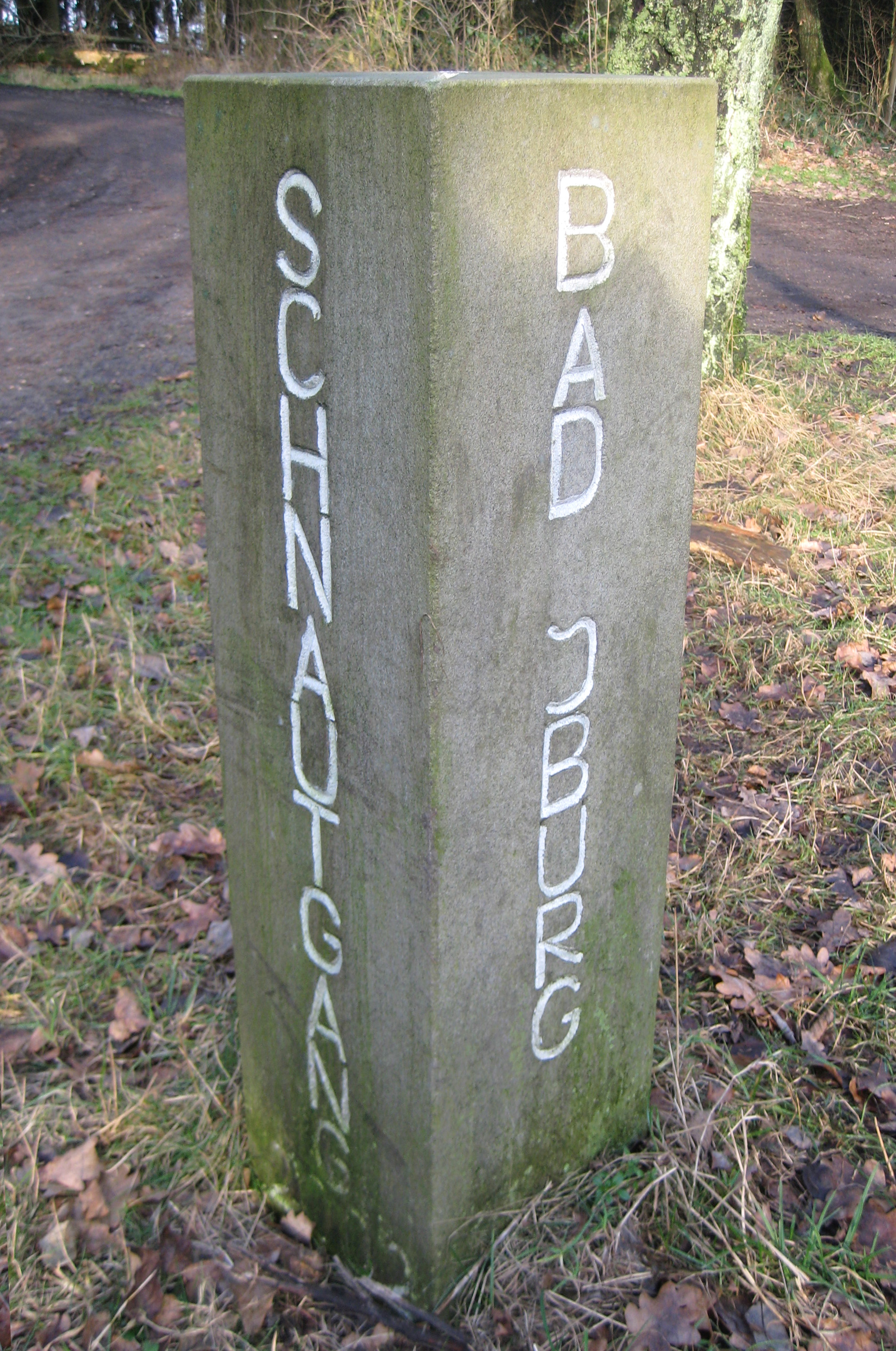
The Schnatgangstein

On the summit of the Dörenberg stands the Hermann's Tower, from which, at a height of 352 m above NN, there are views southeast over the Teutoburg Forest, southwards of the Münsterland and north to the Wiehen Hills. On the Lammersbrink, 2.8 kilometres northwest, stands the Varus Tower. Both observation towers are linked by a hiking trail, the Kammweg ("Crest Way") .

== 1962 air crash ==
In 1962 an aeroplane of the Luftwaffe crashed on the Dörenberg. Both crew members died. A memorial stone has been laid on the Zigzag Way (Zickzackweg) that runs from the Karlsplatz west of the summit towards the Benno Quarry. It bears the inscription: "Am 18. Januar 1962 stürzte an dieser Stelle ein Flugzeug ab. Zwei junge Flieger im Alter von 24 und 26 Jahren fanden den Fliegertod." ("On 18 January 1962 an aircraft crashed at this spot. Two young airmen - 24 and 26 years old - died an airman's death.") The memorial tablet stands below the first bend on Zigzag Way.

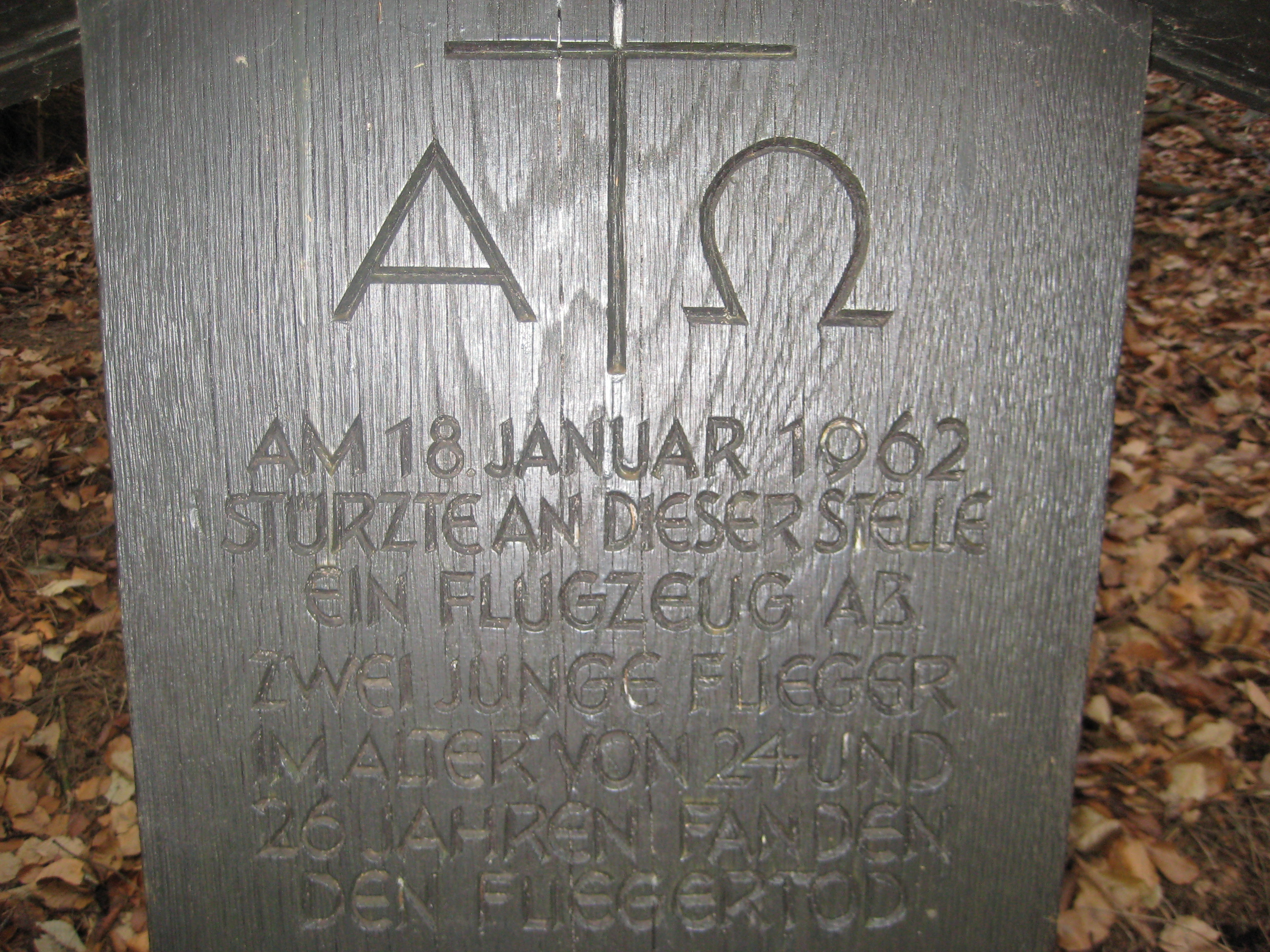
Memorial stone on the Dörenberg to the air crash of 1962

== Panorama ==
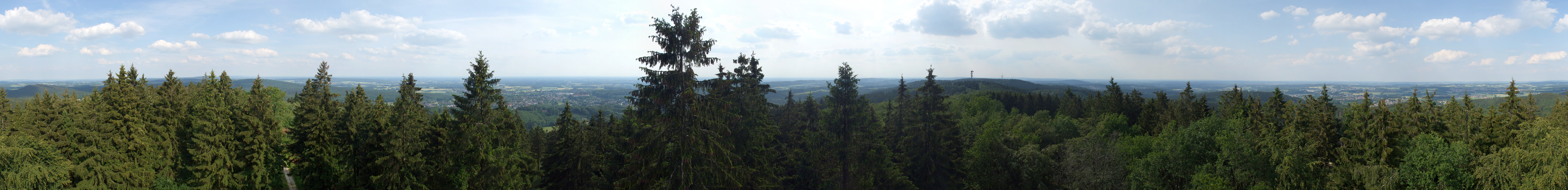
360°-Panorama view from Hermannsturm, facing East (left), South (center) and East (right)
