= Amelungsburg (Süntel) =

Ringfort in Lower Saxony, Germany

- Amelungsberg archaeological heritage site Bodendenkmal Amelungsberg
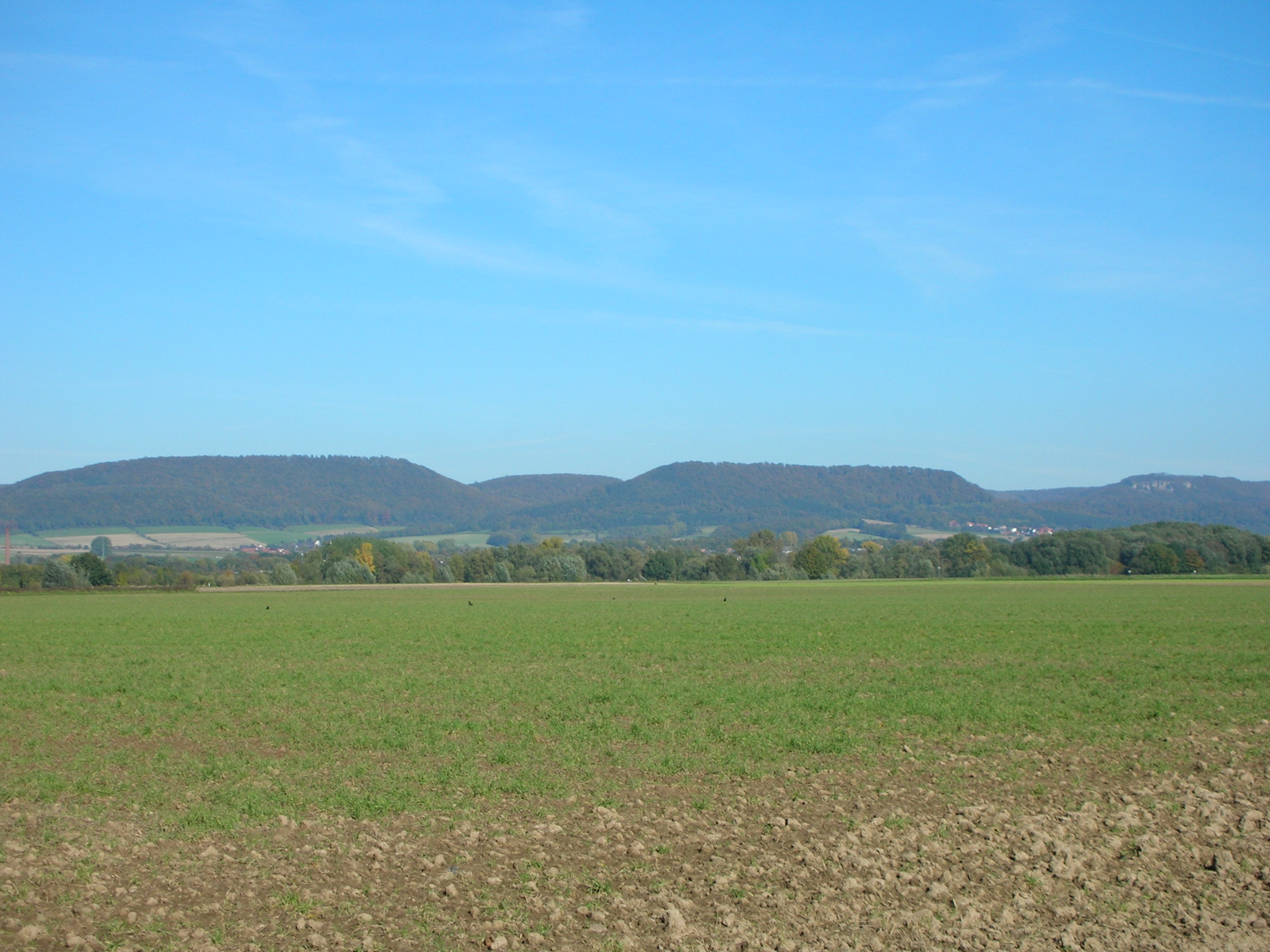
- Amelungsburg, the Mittenberg and the Hohenstein

Site information
- Type: hill castle
- Code: DE-NI
- Condition: earth ramparts, earthworks

Location
- Coordinates: 52°12′03″N 9°16′11″E
- Height: 325 m above sea level (NHN)

Site history
- Built: 300-100 B.C.
- Materials: earthwork-edged wooden posted rampart

Garrison information
- Occupants: no classification

The Amelungsburg is a former ringfort that is located on the Amelungsberg hill on the Süntel ridge in the district of Hameln-Pyrmont in the German state of Lower Saxony.

== Description ==
The site is around 15 hectares and lies on the plateau of Amelungsberg, which is 900 metres long and 300 metres wide, and drops away steeply on all sides. The fortifications comprise a rampart on two sides of the terrain with a length of around 1000 metres. Today it has a height of about 1.5 metres and is up to 4 metres wide. On the other two sides only slight traces of ramparts remain. There are the remains of a former entranceway on the southeastern side of the plateau just under 70 metres west of the present day breach in the defences by a forest track.

Below the site runs a rough 300 metre long advance rampart and moat which shows evidence of an entrance. This earthwork has a width of around 7 metres and is up to 2 metres high. The moat in front of it is around 4 metres wide and still a metre deep.

== Excavations ==
In 1954, 1955, and 2005, excavations took place on the terrain. These established that in the embankment was a dry stone wall about 3 metres wide and up to 2.5 metres high. Animal bones that may have been part of the waste left by the construction force, have been carbon dated to around 400 B.C. About 300 artefacts, including tools, iron wagon parts and tyres are assigned to the La Tène period. The advance rampart is dated to the 8th century. Finds from the Saxon period include two fibulae, spurs, an axe, a knife and a lance head. Anvils, hammers and bronze shavings are evidence of metalworkers.

== History ==
Based on excavations, the fortifications were originally built in the pre-Roman Iron Age, archaeologists reckoning a construction time of up to six weeks. The site was extended during a second phase of use during the Saxon Wars. In 782 in the Süntel a Frankish army under the Saxon duke Widukind was annihilated, leading to the massacre of Verden. The Amelungsburg was not a battlefield - few weapons have been found here - but could have been part of the Saxon's overall military strategy.

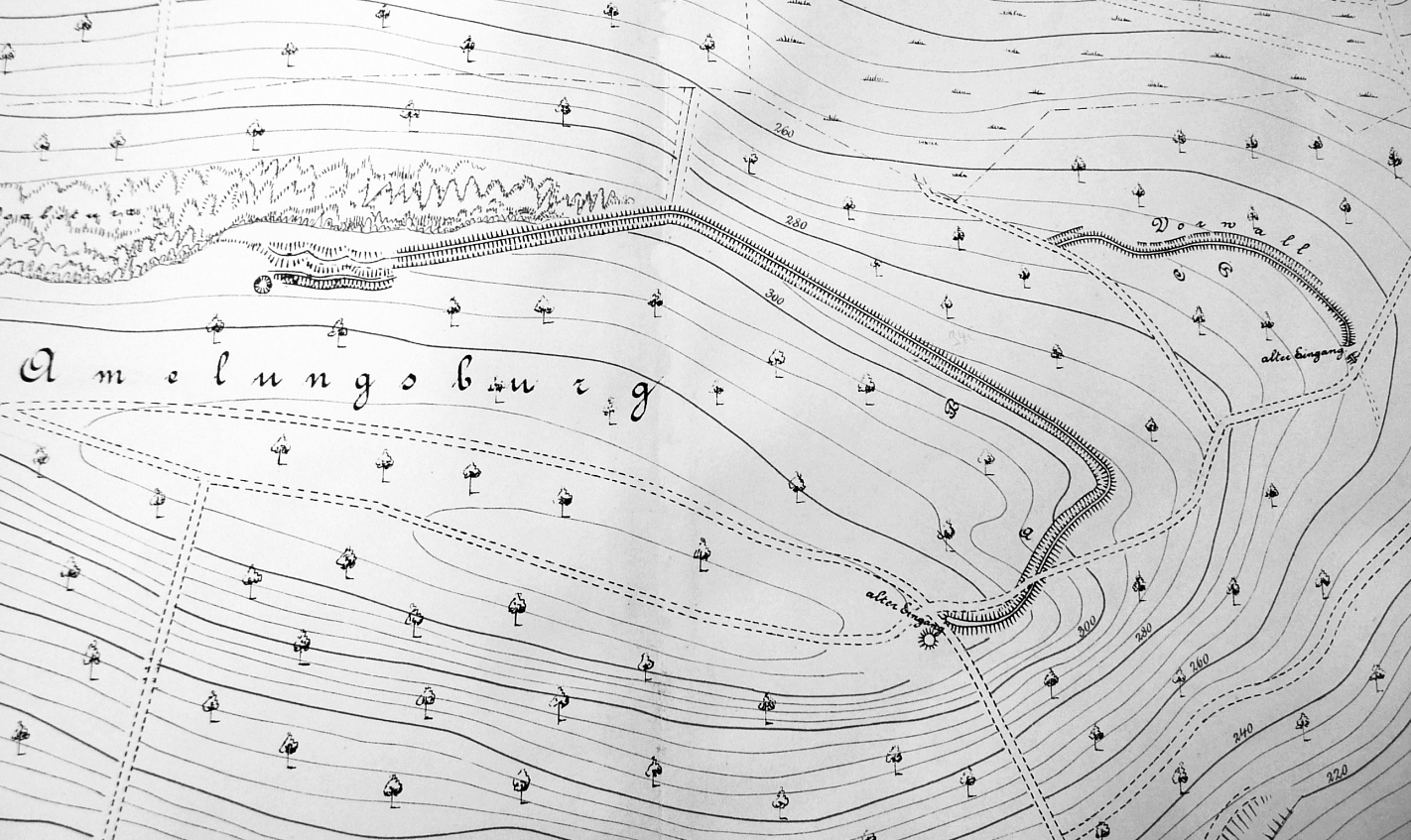
Location sketch by Carl Schuchhardt around 1916

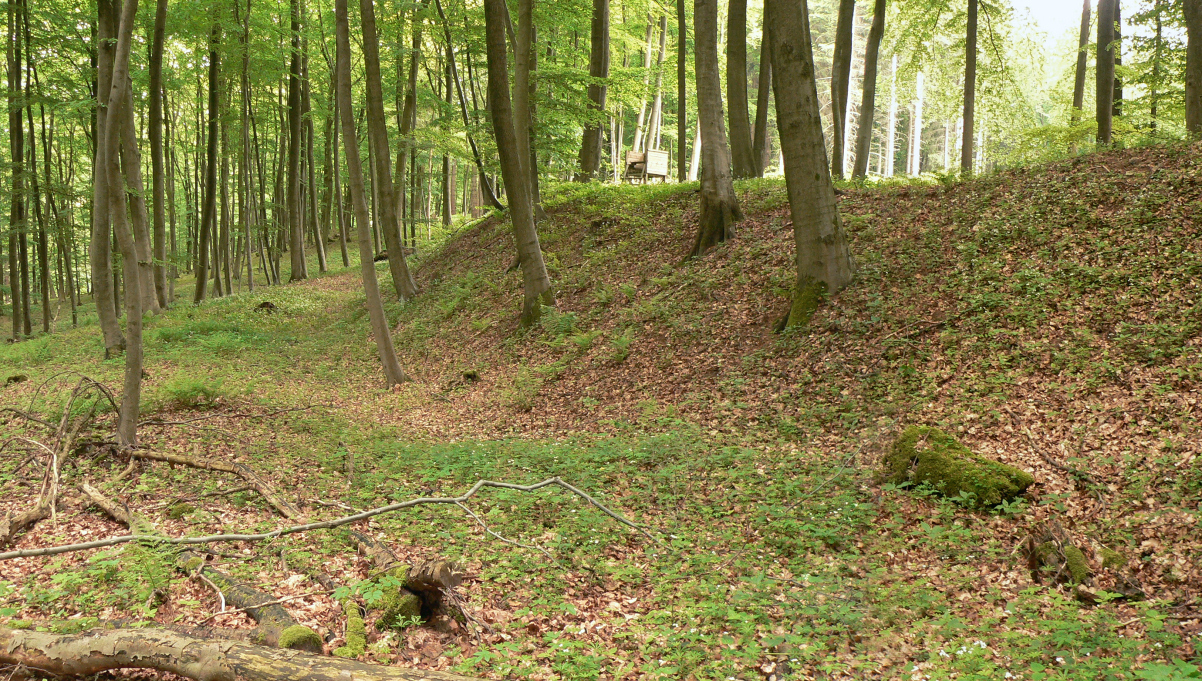
The lower part of the forward rampart

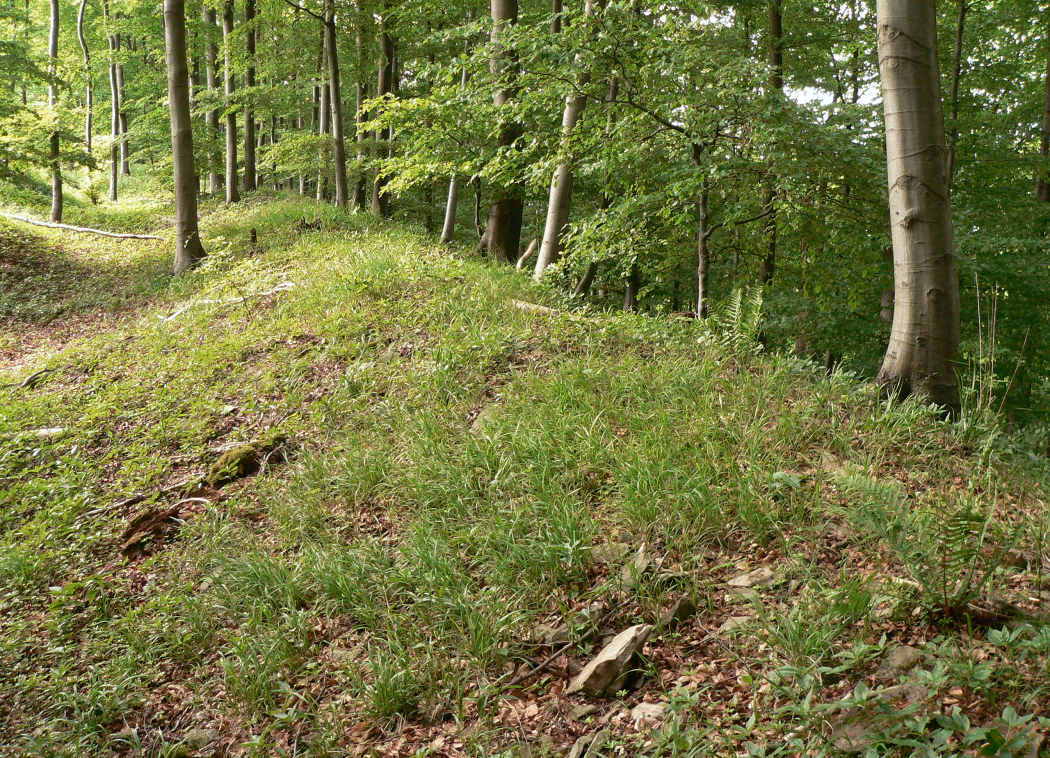
Rampart of the Amelungsburg. Right: the steep slope

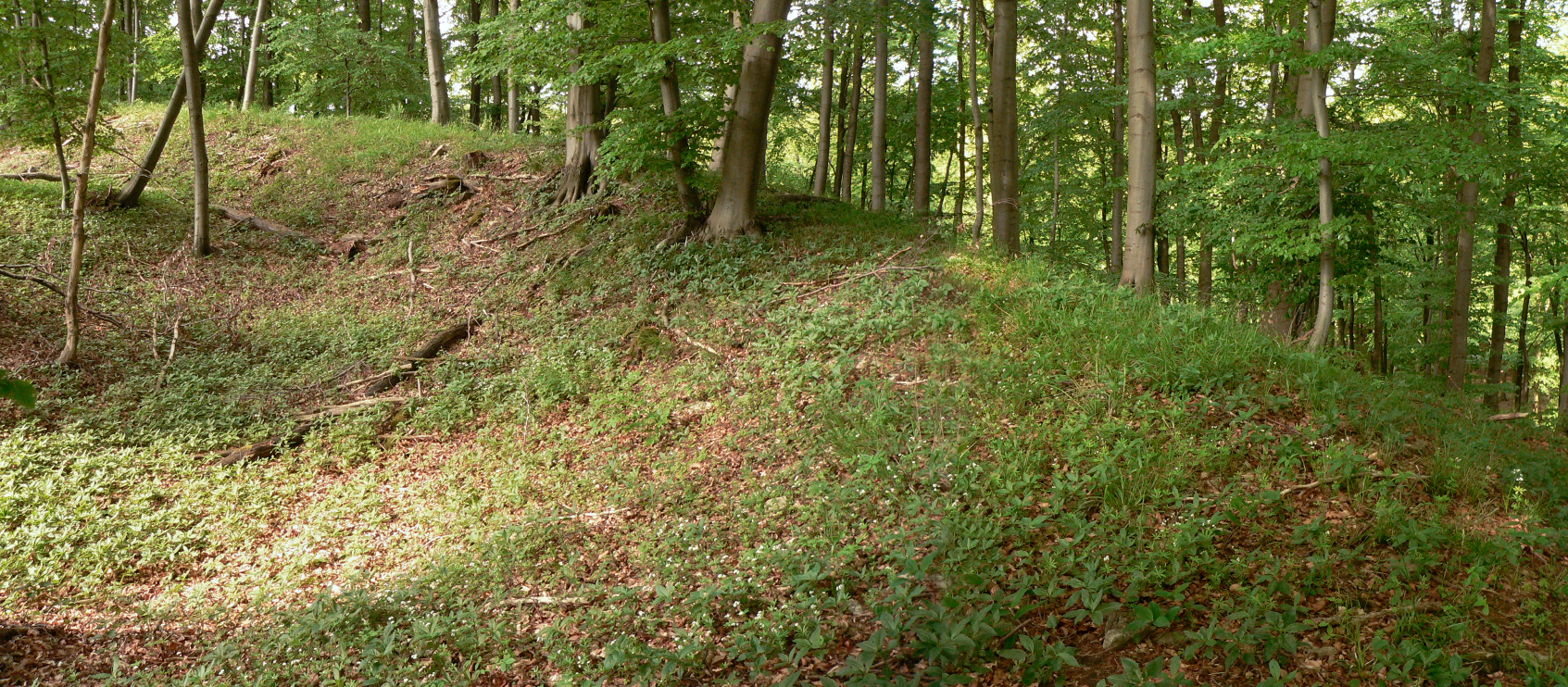
Corner of the rampart

== Literature ==
- Hans-Wilhelm Heine: Schaumburger Land - Burgenland, in der Reihe Wegweiser zur Vor- und Frühgeschichte Niedersachsens (29), Oldenburg, 2010, published by the Lower Saxon State Office for Heritage Conservation (Niedersächsisches Landesamt für Denkmalpflege) and the Archaeological Commission for Lower Saxony (Archäologische Kommission für Niedersachsen), ISBN 978-3-89995-673-3
