= Oldendorf, Melle =

Oldendorf
- Stadtteil of Melle
- Interactive map of Oldendorf
- Location within Germany Location within Lower Saxony
- Coordinates: 52°12′11″N 8°20′10″E
- Country: Germany
- State: Lower Saxony
- District: Osnabrück
- Town: Melle

Area
  - Total: 24 km^{2} (9.3 sq mi)
- Elevation: 76 m (249 ft)

Population (2018-12-31)
  - Total: 4,750
  - Density: 200/km^{2} (510/sq mi)
- Time zone: UTC+01:00 (CET)
  - Summer (DST): UTC+02:00 (CEST)
- Postal codes: 49324
- Dialling codes: 05422

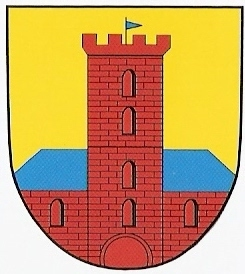
Coat of Arms of Oldendorf

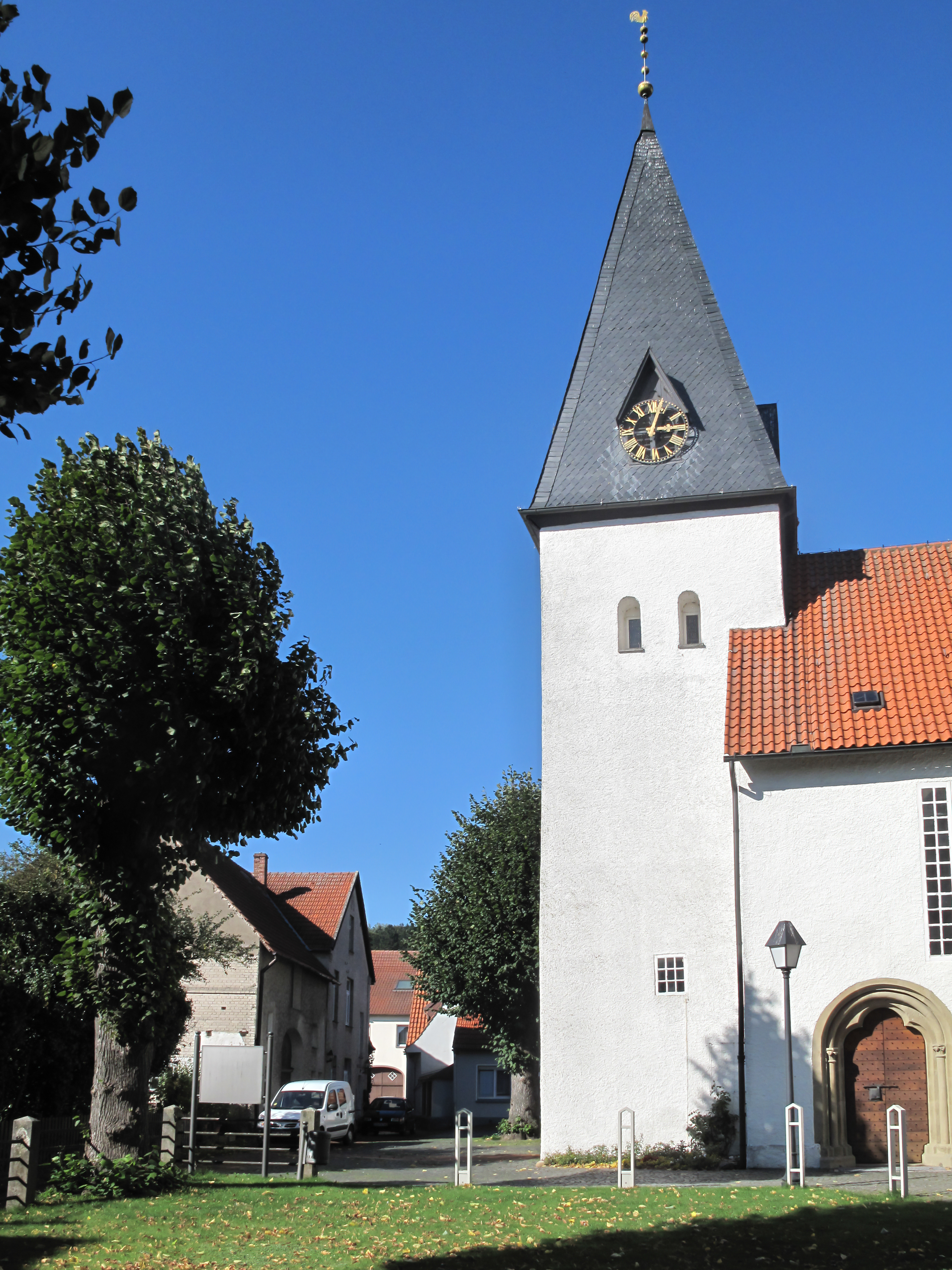
Church: die Marienkirche

Oldendorf (German pronunciation: [ˈɔldn̩dɔʁf]) is a former municipality, now part of Melle, in the district of Osnabrück, in Lower Saxony, Germany. It is on the southern slope of the Wiehengebirge, between the cities of Osnabrück and Bielefeld.

== History ==
Findings at excavations have shown that Oldendorf belongs to the longest settled parts of Melle. There are indications that Oldendorf was inhabited from 10,000 BC on and evidence of structures of settlements may be dated back until around 4000 BC. The reason for the choice of this location was, inter alia, the rising of a rich aquiferous spring at the Westerhausen Hill (German: Westerhausener Berg). Early Germanic settlements took place in the upper farming community in Westerhausen at around 700 BC on the south-facing slope of the Wiehen Hills. Oldendorf was first mentioned in a document of Corvey Abbey in about 1000 AD. Since in Carolingian times the first Meierhöfe were established so did it happen in Westerhausen. Oberholsten, Niederholsten and Föckinghausen were only mentioned in 1240 AD. Due to the construction of a railroad track in 1855 and the installation of a stop in Westerhausen in 1879 the transformation from a farming community to an industrial location began. An economic upturn was induced to Westerhausen and Föckinghausen with completion of the just 3 km away A 30 motorway in 1976.

== Description of Oldendorf ==
Oldendorf can be subdivided into the villages of Föckinghausen, Niederholsten, Oberholsten, Oldendorf and Westerhausen. 63% of the population of Oldendorf are Evangelical Lutherans, 19% are Roman Catholics. The rest belongs to another or none religious community.

=== Economy ===
There are some larger industrial enterprises in Oldendorf such as the office furniture manufacturer Assmann and the rubber rollers producer Westland Gummiwerke. A quite big distribution center of the textile industry logistic firm Deutsche Kleiderspedition and a big warehouse of Thomas Philipps are situated in Oldendorf, too. The largest German cattle semen collection center, the Osnabrücker Herdbuch, is also there. Primarily, Oldendorf is characterized by medium-sized businesses, rural agriculture and all other provision facilities which are typical for such a district.

=== Education and Sport ===
There are two primary schools situated in Oldendorf and Westerhausen. Kindergartens as well as sport fields, football pitches, tennis courts and sport halls are existent in both villages, too.

== Politics ==
Peter Bungard (SPD) is mayor of Oldendorf.

Distribution of seats in the council of Oldendorf:

- SPD 63.82% (10 seats)
- CDU 24.75% (4 seats)
- The Greens 7.66% (1 seat)

(As of: Local elections on 10 September 2006)
