= Ravensberg Basin =

Coordinates: 52°7′N 8°40′E

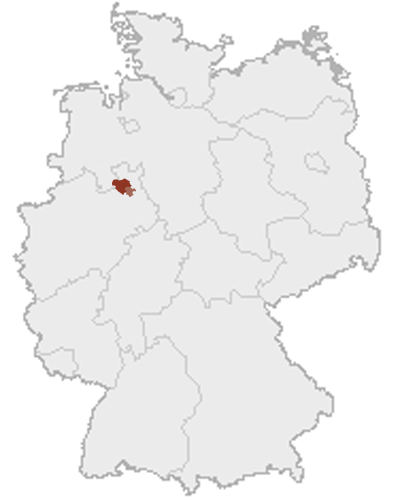
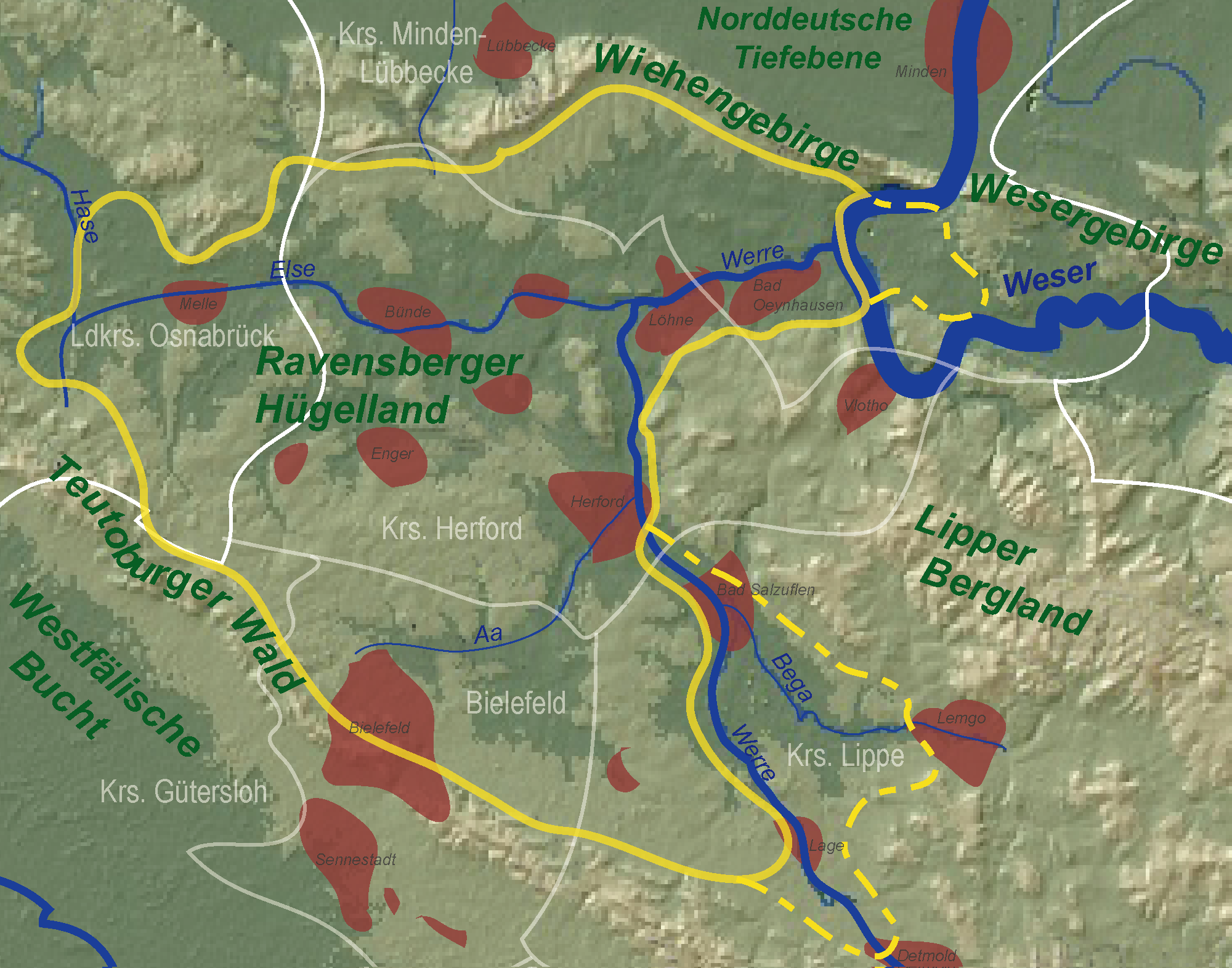
Location
Basic data
Federal state:	North Rhine-Westphalia and Lower Saxony
Natural regions:	Central Uplands; Lower Saxon Hills; Lower Weser Uplands
Highest hills:	256 m above sea level (NN): Steinegge; 165 m above sea level (NN): Schweichler Berg
Lowest point:	41 m above sea level (NN) (northern Weser valley)
Map

The Ravensberg Basin (German: Ravensberger Mulde) or Ravensberg Hills (Ravensberger Hügelland) is a natural region in the governorate of Detmold (Ostwestfalen-Lippe) in the northeastern part of the German state of North Rhine-Westphalia; small elements also fall within the neighbouring state of Lower Saxony. It is part of the lower Weser Uplands and comprises low rolling hills bordered by the ranges of the Wiehen Hills in the north, Lippe Uplands in the east, Teutoburg Forest in the south and Osnabrück Hills in the west. The heart of the Ravensberg Basin is almost coincident with the cultural region of the Ravensberg Land.

== See also ==
- County of Ravensberg
- Ravensberg Land
- Ravensberg Castle
- Minden-Ravensberg (old administrative unit)

== Sources ==
- Adolf Schüttler: Das Ravensberger Land. Aschendorff, Münster 1986.
- Emil Meynen (Hrsg.): Handbuch der naturräumlichen Gliederung Deutschlands. Selbstverlag der Bundesanstalt für Landeskunde, Remagen 1959-1962 (Teil 2, enthält Lieferung 6-9), ISBN B0000BJ19F
