= Ravensberg Land =

Coordinates: 52°7′N 8°40′E

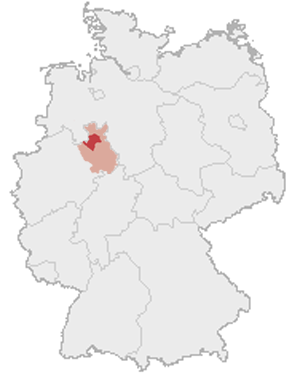
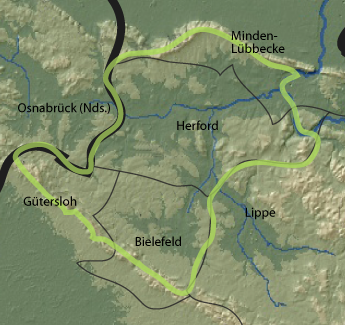
Location
Basic facts
| Bundesland: | North Rhine-Westphalia |
| Province: | Detmold |
| Region: | Ostwestfalen-Lippe |
| Area: | ca. 755 km² |
| Population: | ca. 580,000 (2005) |
| Population density: | 768.2 inhabitants per km² |
| Highest elevation: | 320 m above sea level (NN): a. Auf dem Polle (Bielefeld) b. Heidbrink (Hüllhorst) |
| Lowest elevation: | 41 m above sea level (NN) (northern Weser valley) |
Map

Ravensberg Land (German: Ravensberger Land) is a cultural landscape in the district of Ostwestfalen-Lippe in the northeast of the German federal state of North Rhine-Westphalia. It lies between the Wiehen Hills to the north, the Teutoburg Forest to the south, the state border with Lower Saxony to the west and the large bend in the River Weser and the boundary of Lippe district to the east. It thus essentially encompasses the Westphalian part of the Ravensberg Hills. The most important towns are Bielefeld (northern and central quarters), Herford, Bad Oeynhausen and Bünde.

The area is characterised by long-standing, intensive farming in its loess, hill country, a wide range of industry and a high population density. Historically the region was dominated by centuries of Prussian overlordship. Until into the 20th century, its people were purely of the Evangelical-Lutheran faith and had a common dialect known as Ravensberger Platt.

Ravensberg Land must not be confused with the natural region of the Ravensberg Basin or the territory of the County of Ravensberg. It is often not understood that these three terms are used in different contexts and the areas they relate to, despite significant overlap, are not identical.

== Sources ==
- Hans Riepenhausen: Die bäuerliche Siedlung des Ravensberger Landes bis 1770. Münster 1938.
- Adolf Schüttler: Das Ravensberger Land. Aschendorff, Münster 1986. ISBN 3-402-06348-4
