= Dörentrup =

- Municipality
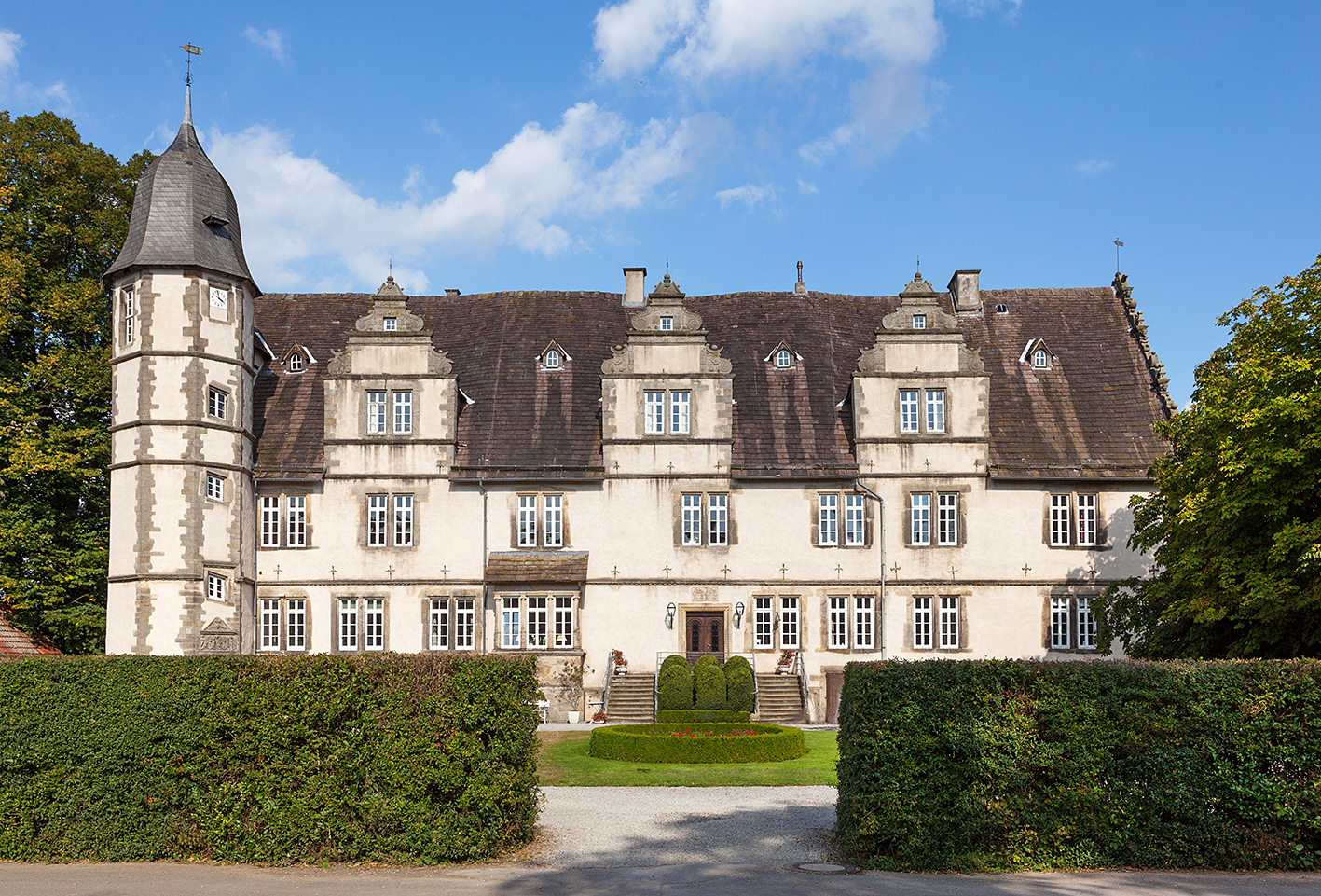
- Schloss Wendlinghausen in Dörentrup

- Coat of arms

- Location of Dörentrup within Lippe district
- Interactive map of Dörentrup
- Location within Germany Location within North Rhine-Westphalia
- Coordinates: 52°01′59″N 09°00′00″E
- Country: Germany
- State: North Rhine-Westphalia
- Admin. region: Detmold
- District: Lippe
- Subdivisions: 5

Government
  - Mayor (2020–25): Friso Veldink (CDU)

Area
  - Total: 49.79 km^{2} (19.22 sq mi)
- Elevation: 130 m (430 ft)

Population (2025-12-31)
  - Total: 7,447
  - Density: 149.6/km^{2} (387.4/sq mi)
- Time zone: UTC+01:00 (CET)
  - Summer (DST): UTC+02:00 (CEST)
- Postal codes: 32694
- Dialling codes: 0 52 65
- Vehicle registration: LIP
- Website: www.doerentrup-lippe.de

Dörentrup (German pronunciation: [ˈdøːʁənˌtʁʊp]) is a municipality in the Lippe district of North Rhine-Westphalia, Germany. It has an area of 49.79 km^{2} and c. 7,500 inhabitants (2025).

The name is derived from the Low German word for hill passes, Dören.

== Population ==
Historical population

Year	Pop.	±% p.a.
1965	7,741	—
1970	8,158	+1.05%
1975	8,266	+0.26%
1980	8,116	−0.37%
1985	7,938	−0.44%
1990	8,226	+0.72%
1995	8,587	+0.86%

Year	Pop.	±% p.a.
2000	8,804	+0.50%
2005	8,610	−0.44%
2010	8,219	−0.93%
2015	7,970	−0.61%
2020	7,662	−0.79%
2025	7,447	−0.57%

Source: Landesdatabank Nordrhein-Westfalen

== Night lighting scheme ==
A remarkable feature in this village is its night lighting scheme. Every night at 11 pm, all street lights turn off. Inhabitants can then request that lights be turned back on as needed by sending a code to a special phone number called Dial4light. Each street has its own code that can be found either online on a specific website or on each light post. This is intended to reduce energy use, save money, respect the nocturnal fauna and avoid light pollution.
