= Schlink =

Schlink is a German surname. Notable people with the surname include:

- Bernhard Schlink, German jurist and writer
- Basilea Schlink, German religious leader and writer
- Edmund Schlink, German Lutheran theologian
- Frederick J. Schlink, American consumer rights activist
