= Monastery =

Religious building

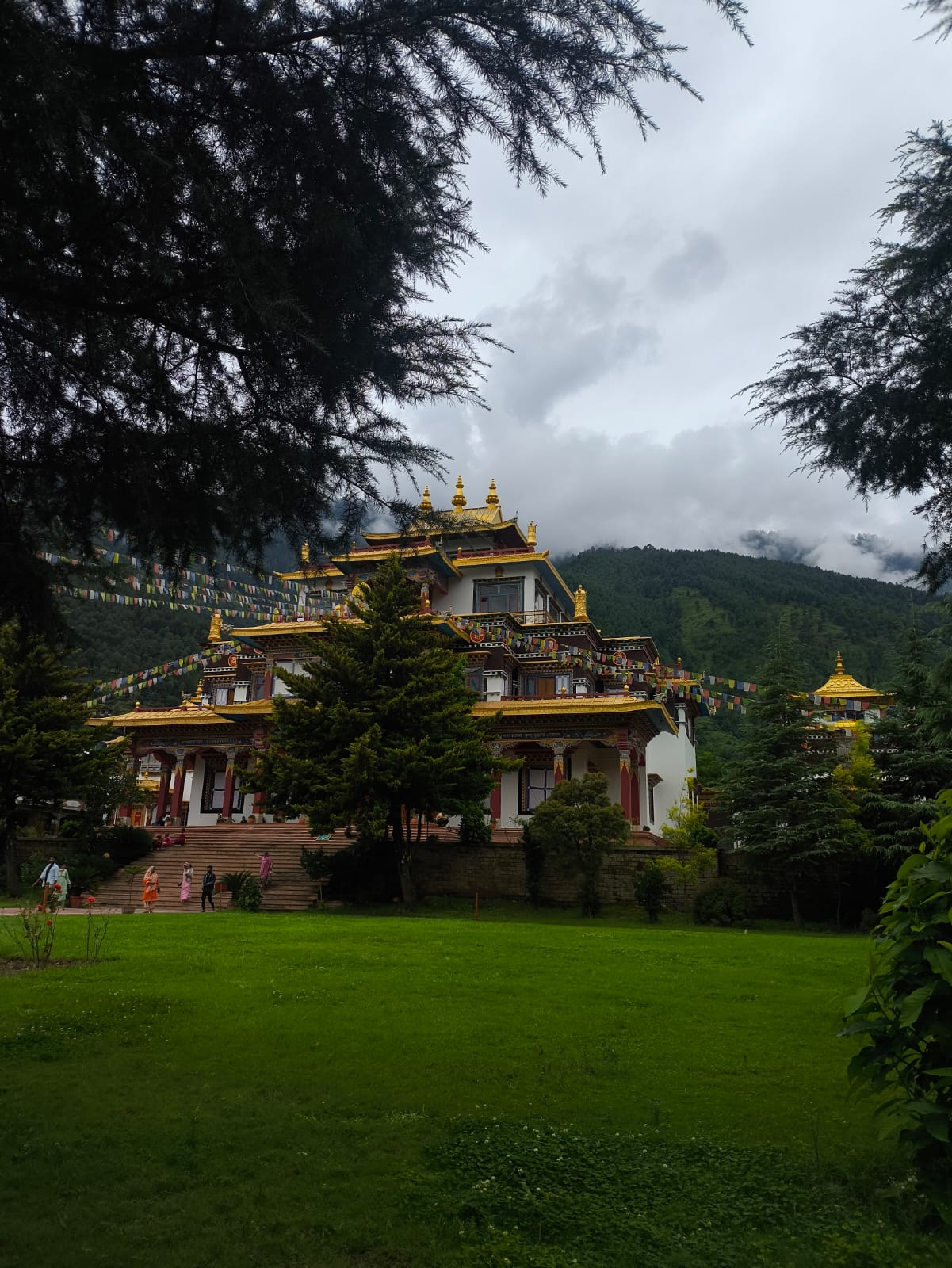
Sharabai Monastery (Himachal Pradesh)

A monastery is a building or complex of buildings comprising the domestic quarters and workplaces of monastics, monks or nuns, whether living in communities (as cenobites) or alone (as hermits). A monastery generally includes a place reserved for prayer which may be a chapel, church, or temple, and may also serve as an oratory, or in the case of communities anything from a single building housing only one senior and two or three junior monks or nuns, to vast complexes and estates housing tens or hundreds. A monastery complex typically comprises a number of buildings which include a church, dormitory, cloister, refectory, library, balneary and infirmary and outlying granges. Depending on the location, the monastic order and the occupation of its inhabitants, the complex may also include a wide range of buildings that facilitate self-sufficiency and service to the community. These may include a hospice, a school, and a range of agricultural and manufacturing buildings such as a barn, a forge, or a brewery.

In English usage, the term 'monastery' is generally used to denote the buildings of a community of monks. In modern usage, convent tends to be applied only to institutions of female monastics (nuns), particularly communities of teaching or nursing religious sisters. Historically, a convent denoted a house of friars (reflecting the Latin), now more commonly called a friary. Various religions may apply these terms in more specific ways.

== Etymology ==
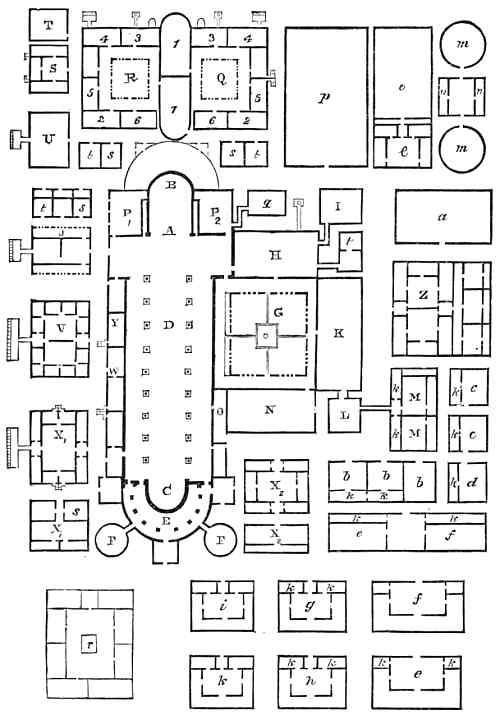
The Plan of Saint Gall, the ground plan of an unbuilt abbey, providing for all of the needs of the monks within the confines of the monastery walls

The word monastery comes from the Greek word μοναστήριον, neut. of μοναστήριος – monasterios from μονάζειν – monazein "to live alone" from the root μόνος – monos "alone" (originally all Christian monks were hermits); the suffix "-terion" denotes a "place for doing something". The earliest extant use of the term monastērion is by the 1st century AD Jewish philosopher Philo in On The Contemplative Life, ch. III.

In England, the word monastery was also applied to the habitation of a bishop and the cathedral clergy who lived apart from the lay community. Most cathedrals were not monasteries, and were served by canons secular, which were communal but not monastic. However, some were run by monastic orders, such as Durham Cathedral. Westminster Abbey was for a short time a cathedral, and was a Benedictine monastery until the Reformation, and its Chapter preserves elements of the Benedictine tradition. See the entry cathedral. They are also to be distinguished from collegiate churches, such as St George's Chapel, Windsor.

=== Terms ===
The term monastery is used generically to refer to any of a number of types of religious community. In the Roman Catholic religion and to some extent in certain branches of Buddhism, there is a somewhat more specific definition of the term and many related terms.

Buddhist monasteries are generally called vihara (Pali language el). Viharas may be occupied by men or women, and in keeping with common English usage, a vihara populated by females may often be called a nunnery or a convent. However, vihara can also refer to a temple. In Tibetan Buddhism, monasteries are often called gompa. In Cambodia, Laos and Thailand, a monastery is called a wat. In Burma, a monastery is called a kyaung.

A Christian monastery may be an abbey (i.e., under the rule of an abbot), or a priory (under the rule of a prior), or conceivably a hermitage (the dwelling of a hermit). It may be a community of men (monks) or of women (nuns). A charterhouse is any monastery belonging to the Carthusian order. In Eastern Christianity, a very small monastic community can be called a skete, and a very large or important monastery can be given the dignity of a lavra.

The great communal life of a Christian monastery is called cenobitic, as opposed to the anchoretic (or anchoritic) life of an anchorite and the eremitic life of a hermit. There has also been, mostly under the Osmanli occupation of Greece and Cyprus, an "idiorrhythmic" lifestyle where monks come together but being able to own things individually and not being obliged to work for the common good.

In Hinduism monasteries are called matha, mandir, koil, or most commonly an ashram.

Jains use the Buddhist term vihara.

== Monastic life ==
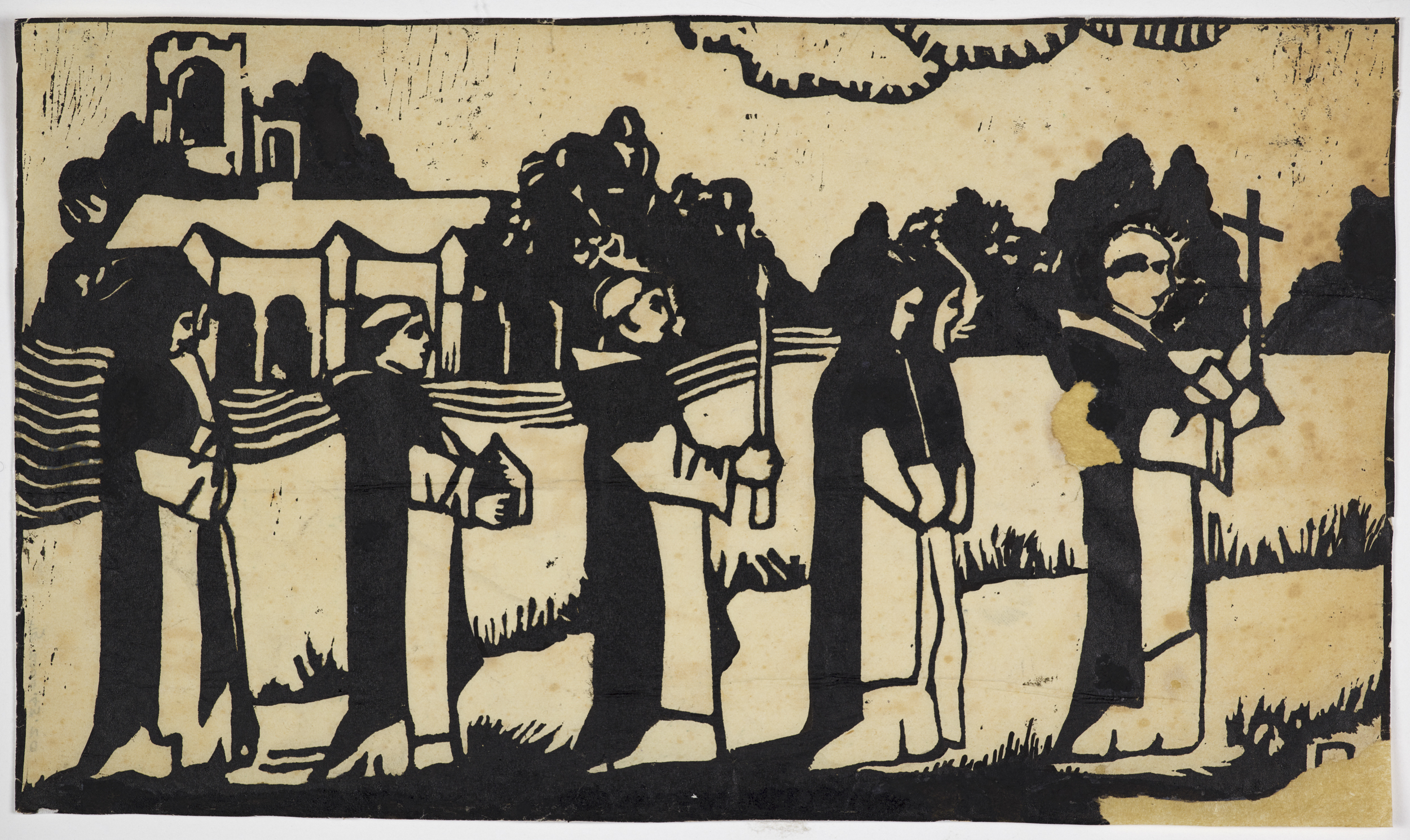
Procession monastique

In most religions, life inside monasteries is governed by community rules that stipulate the gender of the inhabitants and require them to remain celibate and own little or no personal property. The degree to which life inside a particular monastery is socially separate from the surrounding populace can also vary widely; some religious traditions mandate isolation for purposes of contemplation removed from the everyday world, in which case members of the monastic community may spend most of their time isolated even from each other. Others focus on interacting with the local communities to provide services, such as teaching, medical care, or evangelism. Some monastic communities are only occupied seasonally, depending both on the traditions involved and the local climate, and people may be part of a monastic community for periods ranging from a few days at a time to almost an entire lifetime.

Life within the walls of a monastery may be supported in several ways: by manufacturing and selling goods, often agricultural products; by donations or alms; by rental or investment incomes; and by funds from other organizations within the religion, which in the past formed the traditional support of monasteries. There has been a long tradition of Christian monasteries providing hospitable, charitable and hospital services. Monasteries have often been associated with the provision of education and the encouragement of scholarship and research, which has led to the establishment of schools and colleges and the association with universities. Monastic life has adapted to modern society by offering computer services, accounting services and management as well as modern hospital and educational administration.

== Buddhism ==
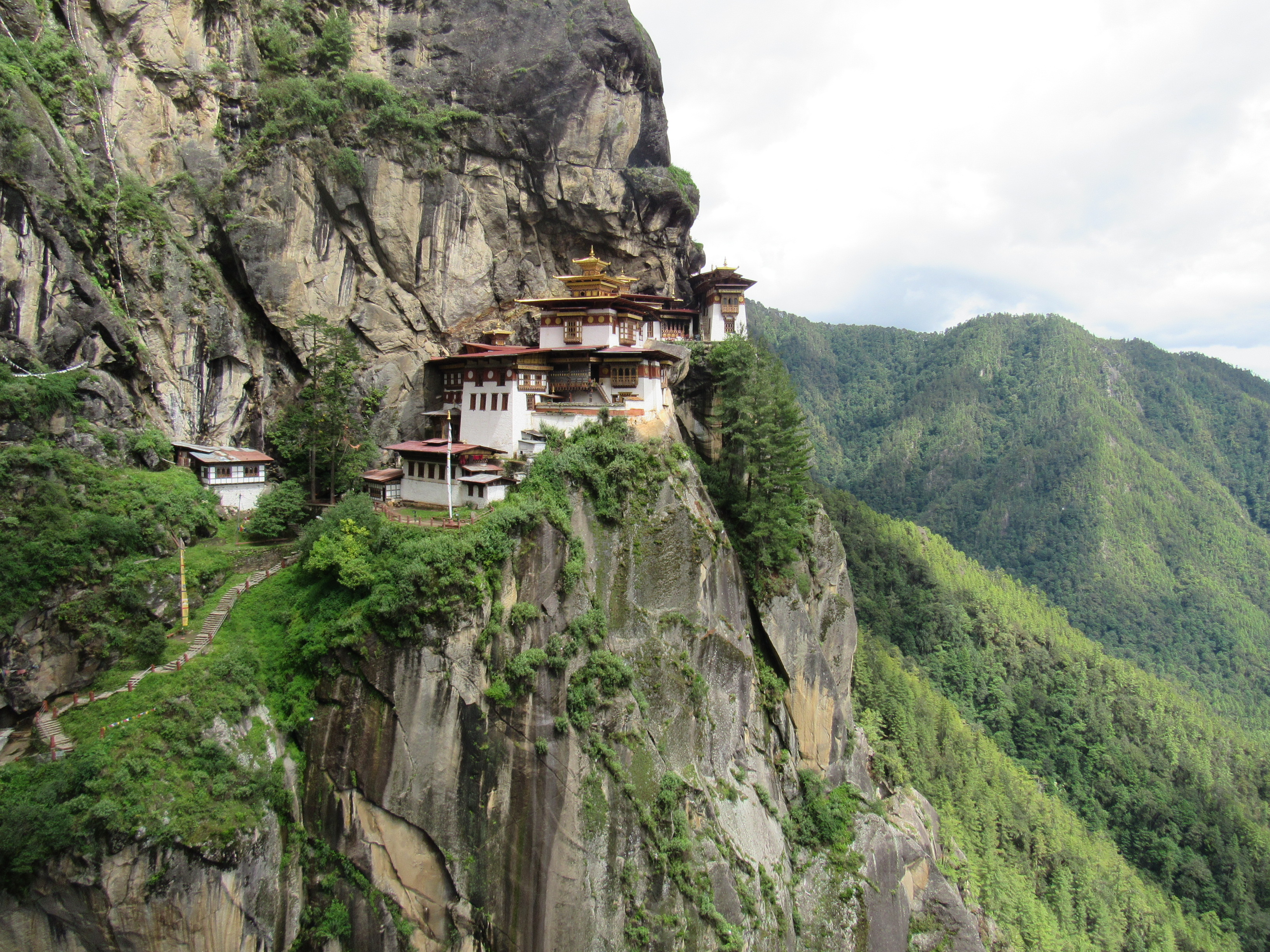
Taktsang Palphug Monastery, also known as Paro Taktsang or "Tiger's Nest"

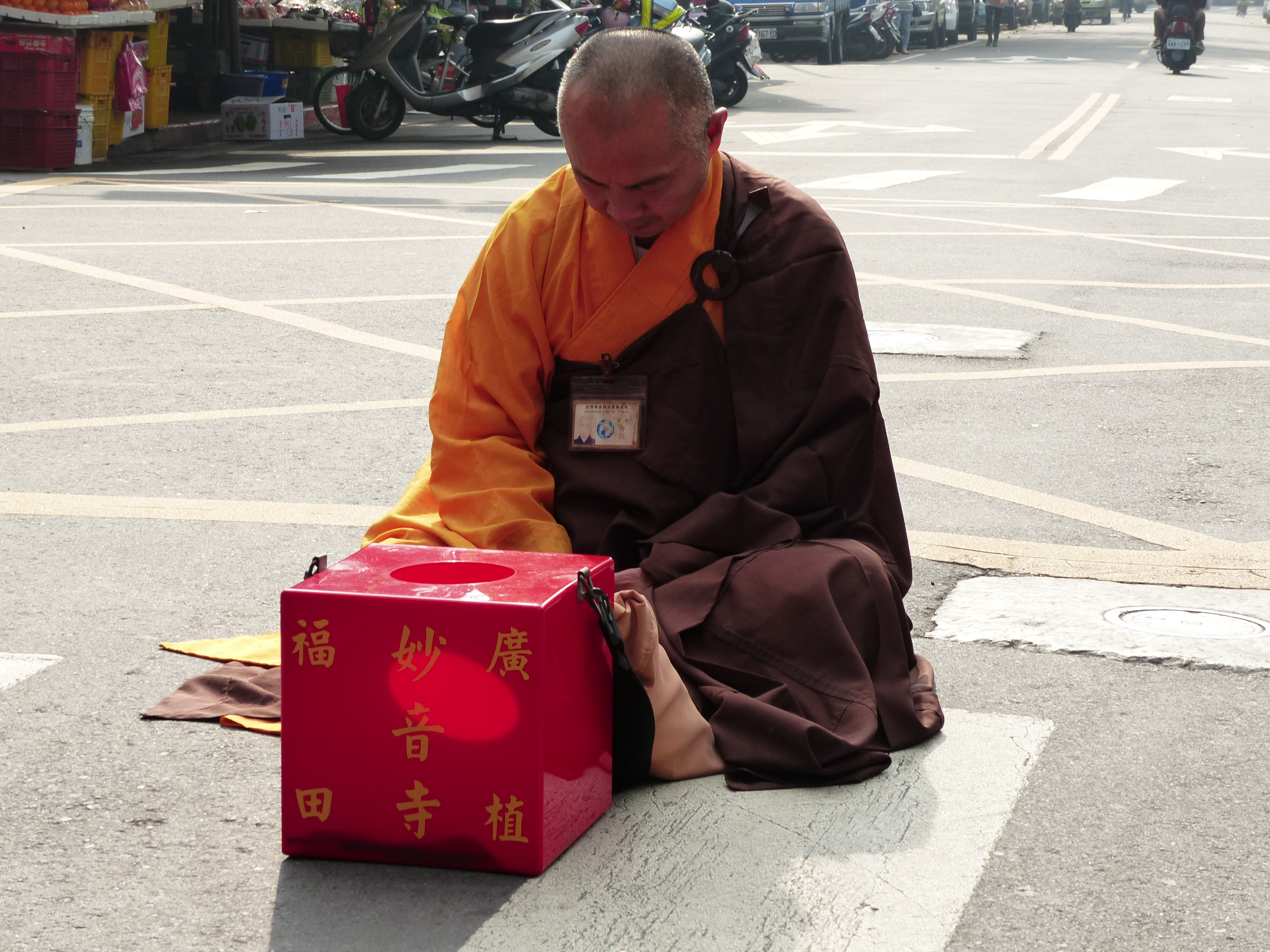
Mendicant monk sitting on Xindong Street, Taipei

Buddhist monasteries, known as vihāra in Pali and in Sanskrit, emerged sometime around the fourth century BC from the practice of vassa, a retreat undertaken by Buddhist monastics during the South Asian wet season. To prevent wandering monks and nuns from disturbing new plant-growth or becoming stranded in inclement weather, they were instructed to remain in a fixed location for the roughly three-month period typically beginning in mid-July.

These early fixed vassa retreats took place in pavilions and parks that wealthy supporters had donated to the sangha. Over the years, the custom of staying on property held in common by the sangha as a whole during the vassa retreat evolved into cenobitic monasticism, in which monks and nuns resided year-round in monasteries.

In India, Buddhist monasteries gradually developed into centres of learning where philosophical principles were developed and debated; this tradition continues in the monastic universities of Vajrayana Buddhists, as well as in religious schools and universities founded by religious orders across the Buddhist world. In modern times, living a settled life in a monastery setting has become the most common lifestyle for Buddhist monks and nuns across the globe.

Whereas early monasteries are considered to have been held in common by the entire sangha, in later years this tradition diverged in a number of countries. Despite vinaya prohibitions on possessing wealth, many monasteries became large landowners, much like monasteries in medieval Christian Europe. In Chinese Buddhism, peasant families worked monastic-owned land in exchange for paying a portion of their yearly crop to the resident monks in the monastery, just as they would to a feudal landlord. In Sri Lanka and in Tibetan Buddhism, the ownership of a monastery often became vested in a single monk, who would often keep the property within the family by passing it on to a nephew ordained as a monk. In Japan, where civil authorities permitted Buddhist monks to marry, the position of head of a temple or monastery sometimes became hereditary, passed from father to son over many generations.

Forest monasteries – most commonly found in the Theravada traditions of Southeast Asia and Sri Lanka – are monasteries dedicated primarily to the study and cultivation of Buddhist meditation, rather than to scholarship or ceremonial duties. Forest monasteries often function like early Christian monasteries, with small groups of monks living an essentially hermit-like life gathered loosely around a respected elder teacher. While the wandering lifestyle practised by the Buddha and by his disciples continues to be the ideal model for forest-tradition monks in Thailand, Myanmar, Sri Lanka and elsewhere, practical concerns—including shrinking wilderness areas, lack of access to lay supporters, dangerous wildlife, and dangerous border conflicts—dictate that increasing numbers of "meditation" monks live in monasteries, rather than wandering.

Buddhist monasteries include some of the largest in the world. Drepung Monastery in Tibet housed around 10,000 monks prior to the Chinese invasion in 1950–1951.

Tibetan Buddhist monasteries or gompas are sometimes known as lamaseries, with their monks sometimes (mistakenly) known as lamas. Helena Blavatsky's Theosophical Society named its initial New York City meeting-place "the Lamasery".

Notable Buddhist monasteries include:

- Donglin Temple, Jiangxi (China)
- Fo Guang Shan Monastery, Taiwan
- Jetavana, Shravasti (India)
- Nalanda, India
- Pa-Auk Forest Monastery, Myanmar
- Po Lin Monastery, Hong Kong
- Tengboche Monastery, Nepal

For a further list of Buddhist monasteries see list of Buddhist temples.

== Christianity ==
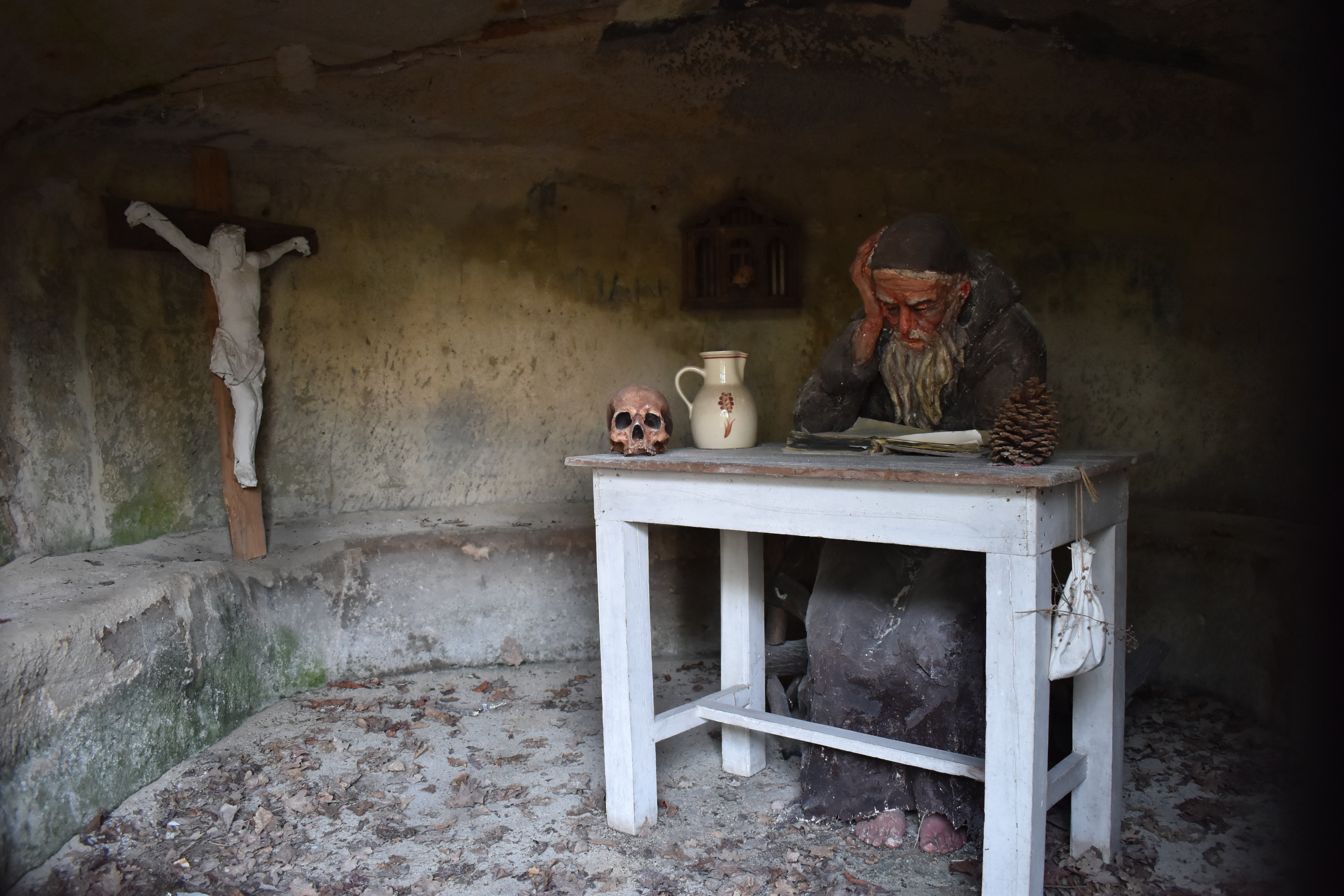
Hermit in the cave – Lochotín park in Plzeň

According to tradition, Christian monasticism began in Egypt with Anthony the Great. Originally, all Christian monks were hermits seldom encountering other people.

A transitional form of monasticism was later created by Ammonas in which "solitary" monks lived close enough to one another to offer mutual support as well as gathering together on Sundays for common services.

It was Pachomius the Great who developed the idea of cenobitic monasticism: having renunciates live together and worship together under the same roof. Some attribute his mode of communal living to the barracks of the Roman Army in which Pachomios served as a young man. Soon the Egyptian desert blossomed with monasteries, especially around Nitria (Wadi El Natrun), which was called the "Holy City". Estimates are that thousands of monks lived in this area at any one time. Eremetism never died out though, but was reserved only for those advanced monks who had worked out their problems within a cenobitic monastery.

The idea caught on, and other places followed:

- Upon his return from the Council of Serdica, Athanasius of Alexandria established the first Christian monastery in Europe circa 344 near modern-day Chirpan in Bulgaria.
- Mar Awgin founded a monastery on Mount Izla above Nusaybin in Mesopotamia (~350), and from this monastery the cenobitic tradition spread in Mesopotamia, Persia, Armenia, Georgia and even India and China.
- Mar Saba organized the monks of the Judaean Desert in a monastery close to Bethlehem (483), and this is considered the mother of all monasteries of Eastern Orthodoxy.
- Benedict of Nursia founded the monastery of Monte Cassino in Italy (529), which was the seed of Roman Catholic monasticism in general, and of the Order of Saint Benedict in particular.
- The Carthusians were founded by Bruno of Cologne at the Grande Chartreuse, from which the religious Order takes its name, in the eleventh century as an eremitical community, and remains the motherhouse of the Order.
- Jerome and Paula of Rome decided to go and live a hermit's life in Bethlehem and founded several monasteries in the Holy Land. This way of life inspired the foundation of the Hieronymites in Spain and Portugal. The Monastery of Santa María del Parral in Segovia is the motherhouse of the Order.

=== Western Christianity ===
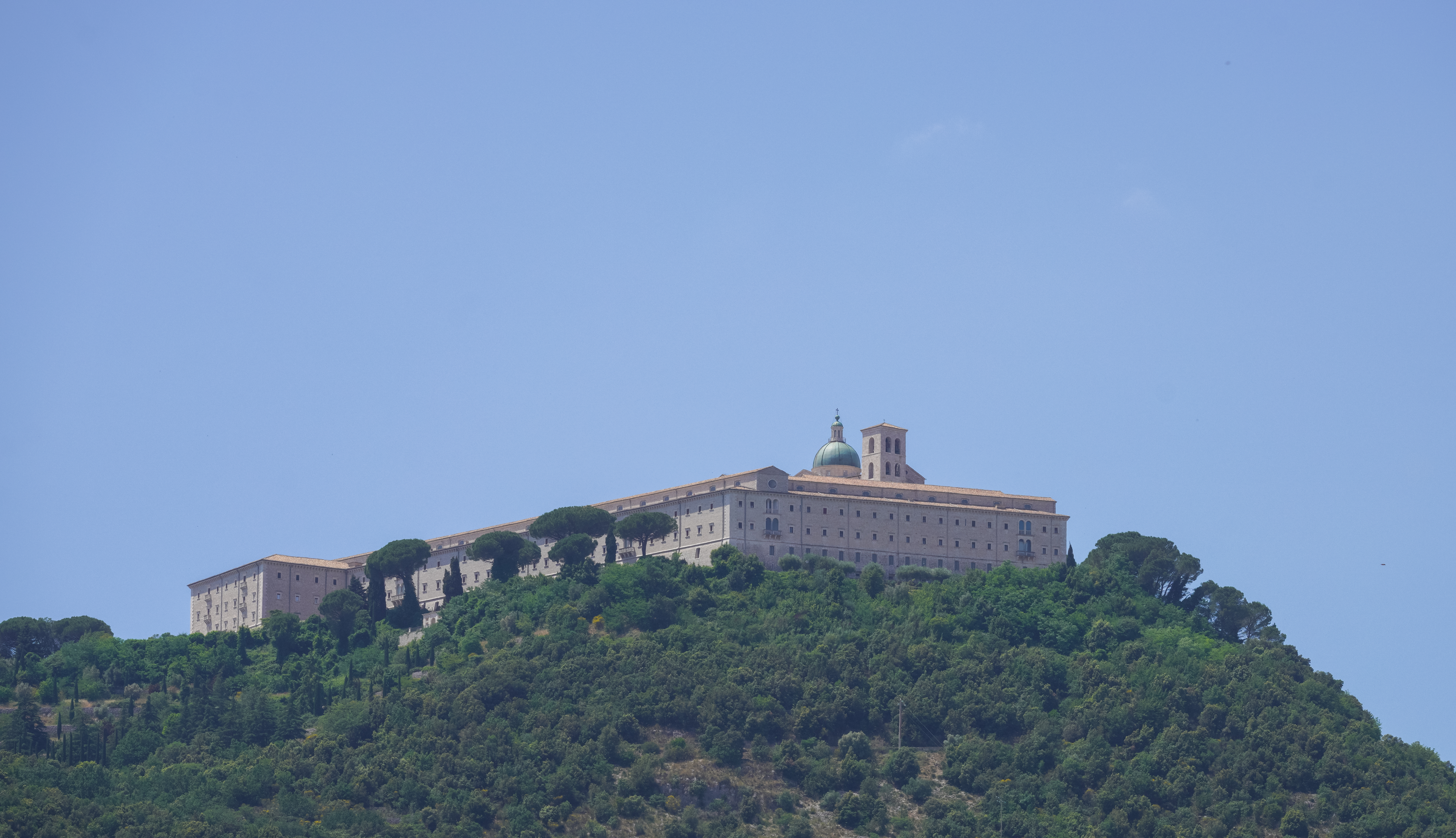
Abbey of Monte Cassino, originally built by Benedict of Nursia, shown here as rebuilt after World War II

In the Western Christian Church, the life of prayer and communal living was one of rigorous schedules and self-sacrifice. Prayer was their work, and the Office prayers took up much of a monk's waking hours – Matins, Lauds, Prime, Terce, daily Mass, Sext, None, Vespers, and Compline. In between prayers, monks were allowed to sit in the cloister and work on their projects of writing, copying, or decorating books. These would have been assigned based on a monk's abilities and interests. The non-scholastic types were assigned to physical labour of varying degrees.

The main meal of the day took place around noon, often taken at a refectory table, and consisted of the most simple foods e.g., poached fish, bread, vegetables, eggs, cheese, boiled oats. While they ate, scripture would be read from a pulpit above them. Since no other words were allowed to be spoken, monks developed communicative gestures. Abbots and notable guests were honoured with a seat at the high table, while everyone else sat perpendicular to that in the order of seniority. This practice remained when some monasteries became universities after the first millennium, and can still be seen at Oxford University and Cambridge University.

Monasteries were important contributors to the surrounding community. They were centres of intellectual progression and education. They welcomed aspiring priests to come and study and learn, allowing them even to challenge doctrine in dialogue with superiors. The earliest forms of musical notation are attributed to a monk named Notker of St Gall, and was spread to musicians throughout Europe by way of the interconnected monasteries. Since monasteries offered respite for weary pilgrim travellers, monks were obligated also to care for their injuries or emotional needs. Over time, lay people started to make pilgrimages to monasteries instead of just using them as a stopover. By this time, they had sizeable libraries that attracted learned tourists. Families would donate a son in return for blessings. During the plagues, monks helped to till the fields and provide food for the sick.

A Warming House, or calefactory, is a common part of a medieval monastery, where monks went to warm themselves. It was often the only room in the monastery where a fire was lit.

==== Catholic ====
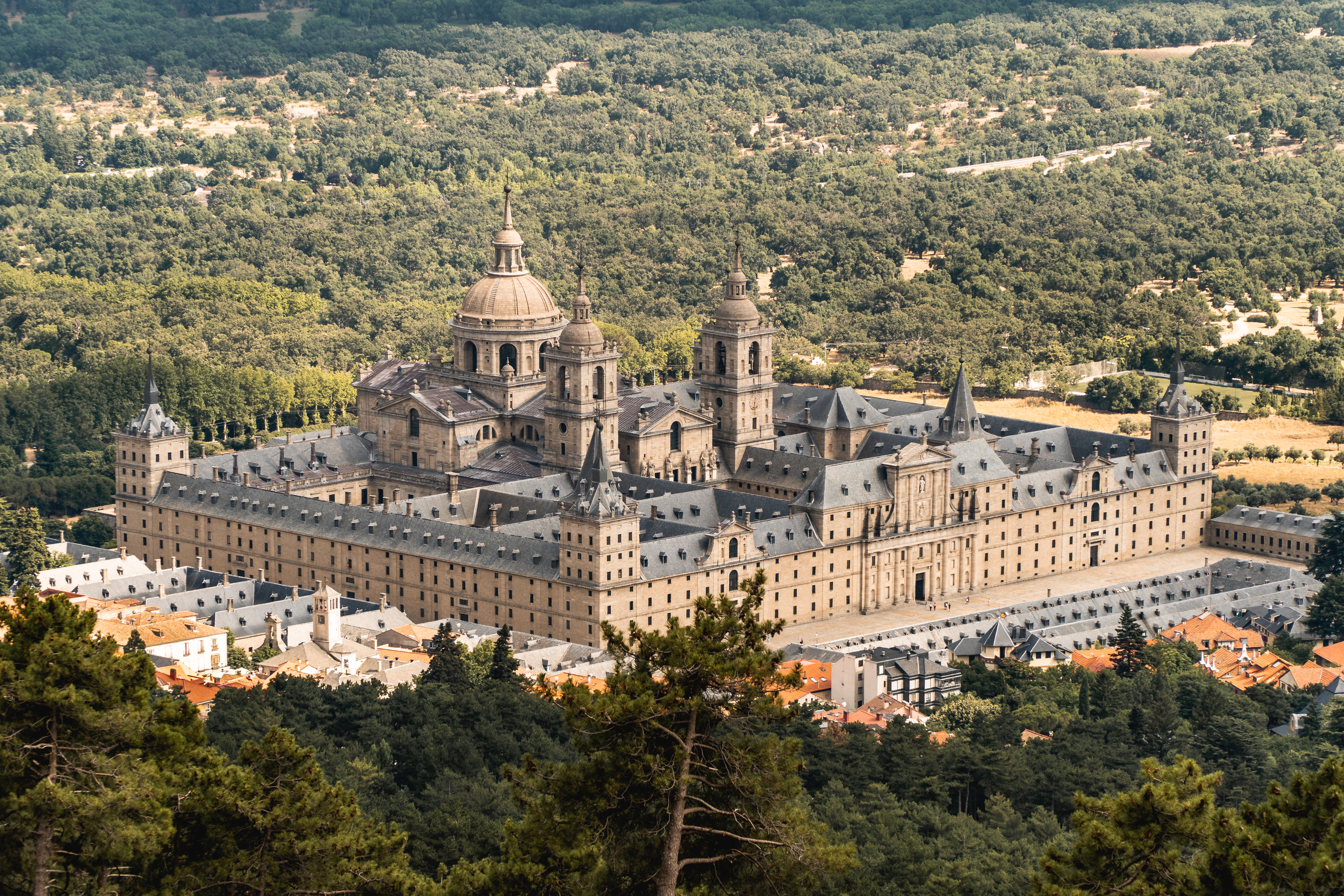
El Escorial

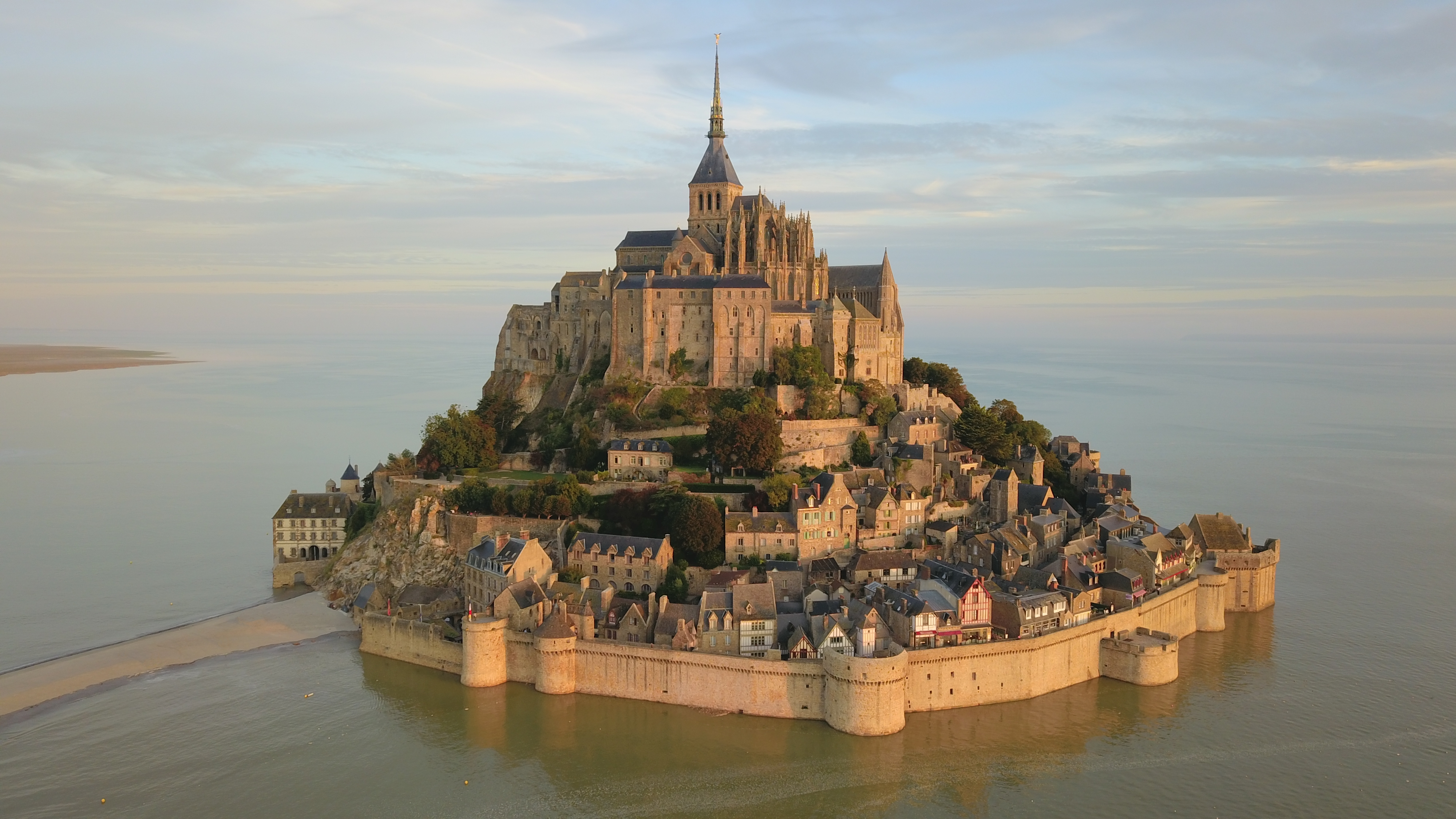
Mont-Saint-Michel

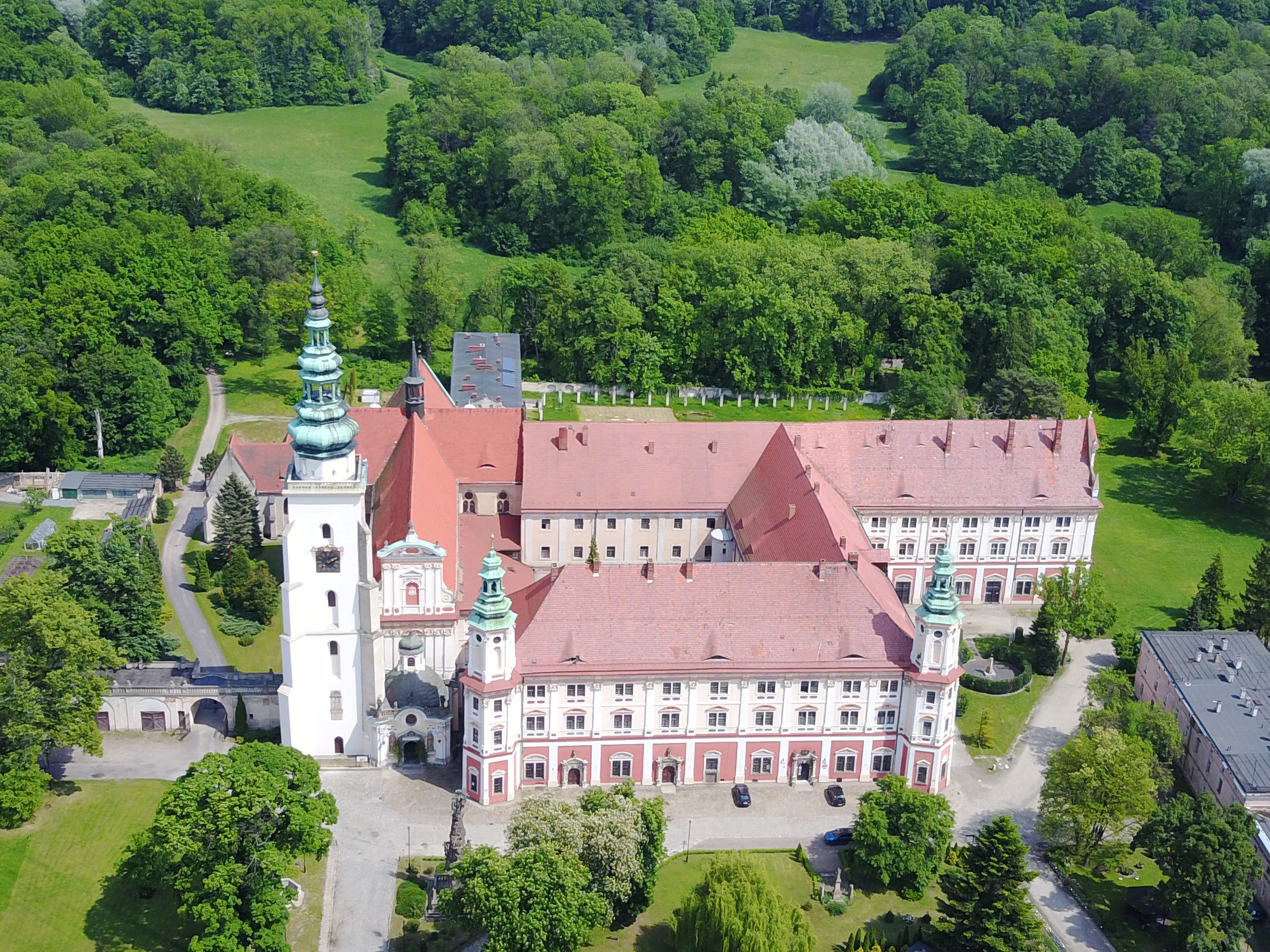
Cistercian Monastery Complex in Henryków

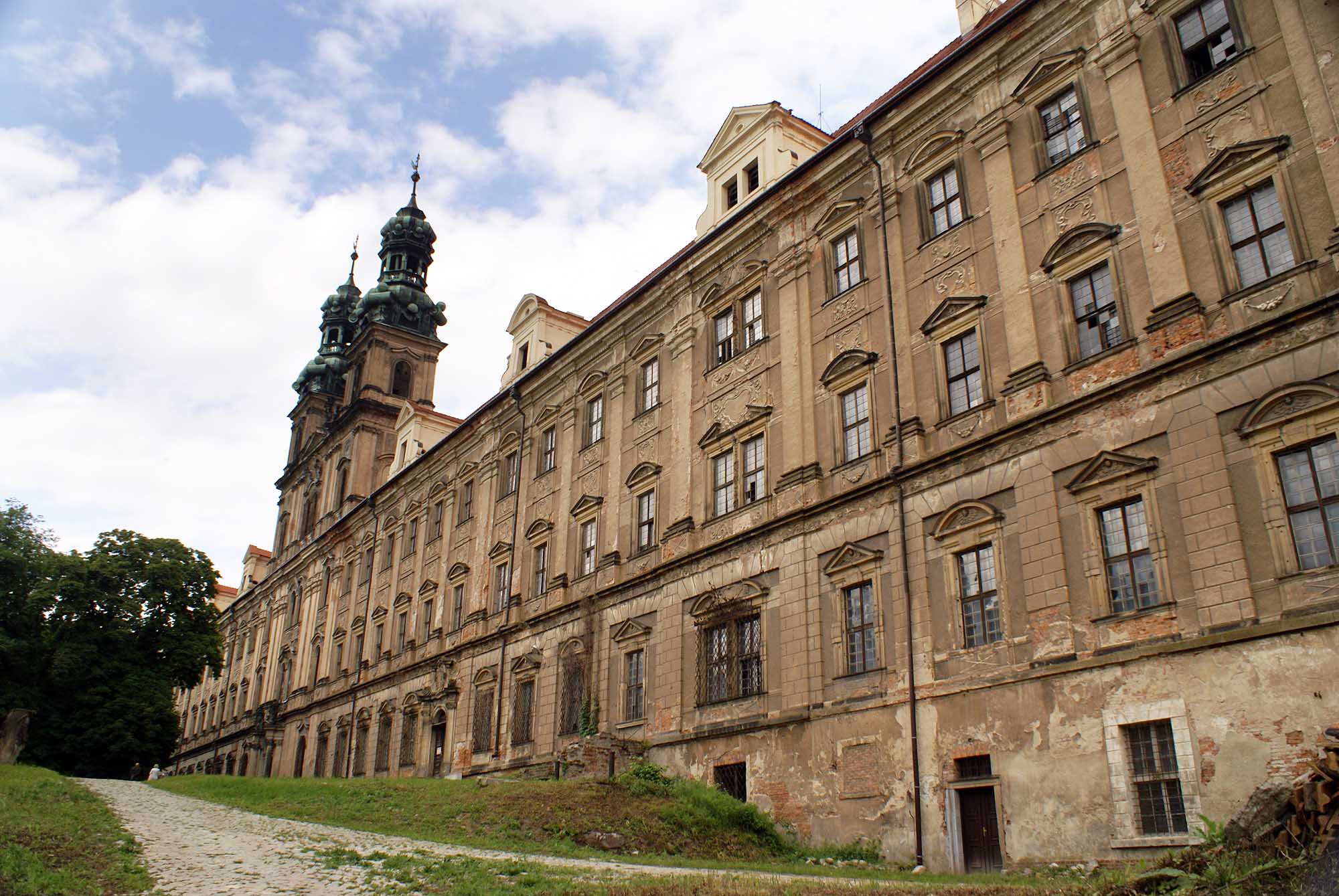
Lubiąż Abbey

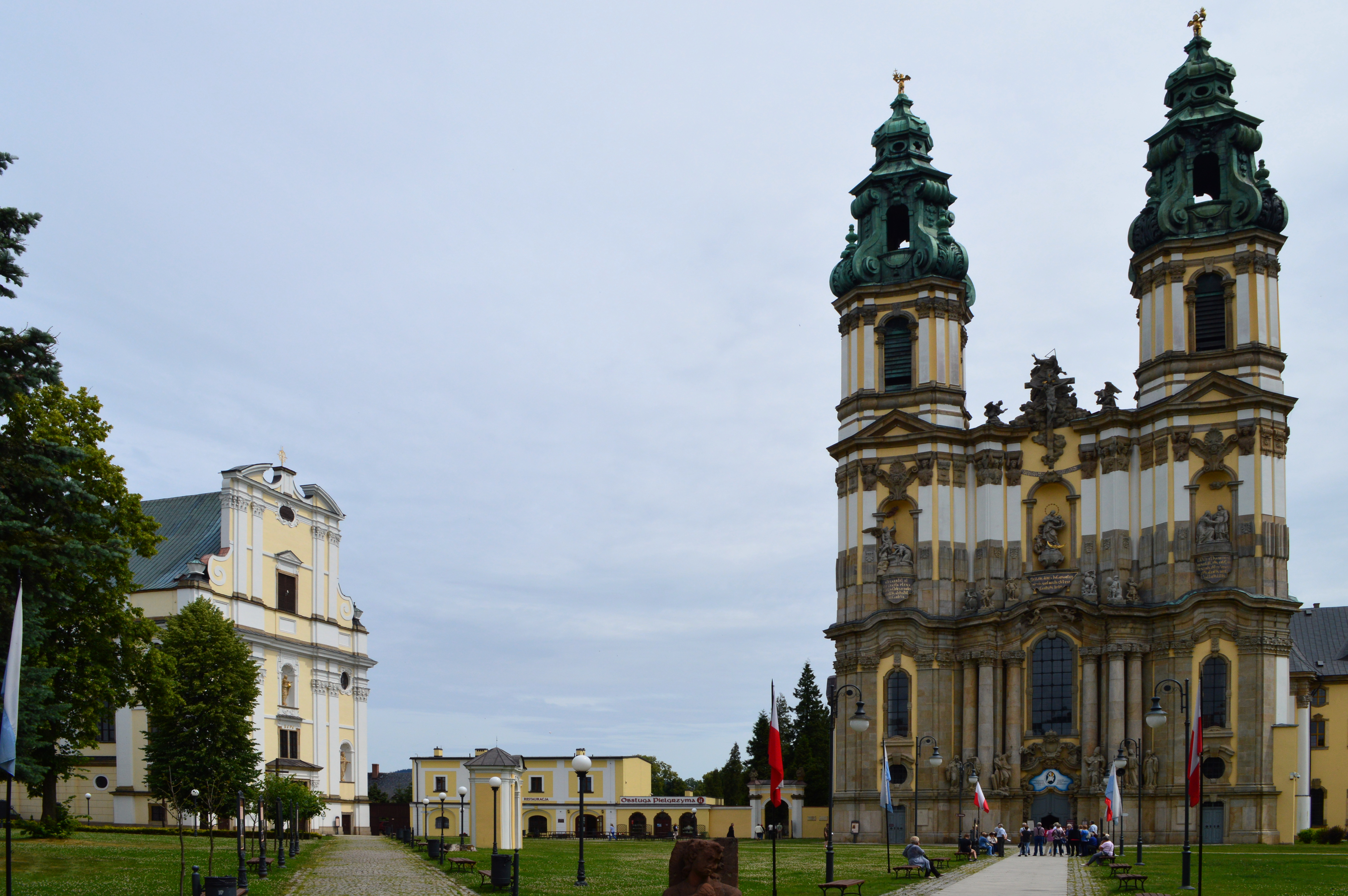
Krzeszów Abbey

A number of distinct monastic orders developed within Roman Catholicism:

- Camaldolese monks
- Canons Regular of the Order of the Holy Cross, priests and brothers, all of whom live together like monks according to the Rule of St. Augustine
- Canons Regular of St Augustine
- Carmelite hermits and Carmelite nuns (from the Ancient Observance and Discalced branch)
- Cistercian Order, with monks and nuns (both of the Original Observance and of the Trappist reform)
- Monks and Sisters of Bethlehem
- Order of Minims, founded by Francis of Paola
- Order of Saint Benedict, known as the Benedictine monks and nuns, founded by Benedict of Nursia with Scholastica, stresses manual labour in self-subsistent monasteries. See also: Cluniac Reforms
- Order of Saint Claire, best known as the Poor Clares (of all the observances)
- Order of Saint Jerome, inspired by Jerome and Paula of Rome, known as the Hieronymite monks and nuns
- Order of Saint Paul the First Hermit, known as the Pauline Fathers
- Order of the Annunciation of the Blessed Virgin Mary, also known as Sisters of the Annunciation or Annociades, founded by Joan of France
- Order of the Carthusians, a hermitical religious order founded by Bruno of Cologne
- Order of the Immaculate Conception, also known as the Conceptionists, founded by Beatrice of Silva
- Order of the Most Holy Annunciation, also known as Turchine Nuns or Blue Nuns, founded by Maria Vittoria De Fornari Strata
- Order of the Most Holy Savior, known as Bridgettine nuns and monks, founded by Bridget of Sweden
- Order of the Visitation of Holy Mary, known as the Visitandine nuns, founded by Francis de Sales and Jane Frances de Chantal
- Passionists
- Premonstratensian canons ("The White Canons")
- Tironensian monks ("The Grey Monks")
- Valliscaulian monks

While in English most mendicant Orders use the monastic terms of monastery or priory, in the Latin languages, the term used by the friars for their houses is convent, from the Latin conventus, e.g., (Italian: convento) or (French: couvent), meaning "gathering place". Franciscans commonly call their house a "friary".

==== Lutheran ====
After the foundation of the Lutheran churches, some monasteries in Lutheran lands (such as Amelungsborn Abbey near Negenborn and Loccum Abbey in Rehburg-Loccum) and convents (such as Ebstorf Abbey near the town of Uelzen and Bursfelde Abbey in Bursfelde) adopted the Lutheran Christian faith.

In 1947 Mother Basilea Schlink and Mother Martyria founded the Evangelical Sisterhood of Mary, in Darmstadt, Germany.

In 1948, Bavarian Lutheran priest Walter Hümmer and his wife Hanna founded the Communität Christusbruderschaft Selbitz.

In 1958, Arthur Kreinheder established The Congregation of the Servants of Christ at St. Augustine's House in Oxford, Michigan. It is a Lutheran monastery in the Benedictine tradition. Strong ties remain with this community and their brothers in Sweden (Östanbäck Monastery) and in Germany the (Priory of St. Wigbert).

In Germany, Communität Casteller Ring is a Benedictine Lutheran community for women.

=== Anglican ===
In the 19th-century monasticism was revived in the Church of England, leading to the foundation of such institutions as the House of the Resurrection, Mirfield (Community of the Resurrection), Nashdom Abbey (Benedictine), Cleeve Priory (Community of the Glorious Ascension) and Ewell Monastery (Cistercian), Benedictine orders, Franciscan orders and the Orders of the Holy Cross, Order of St. Helena.

=== Eastern Orthodox ===
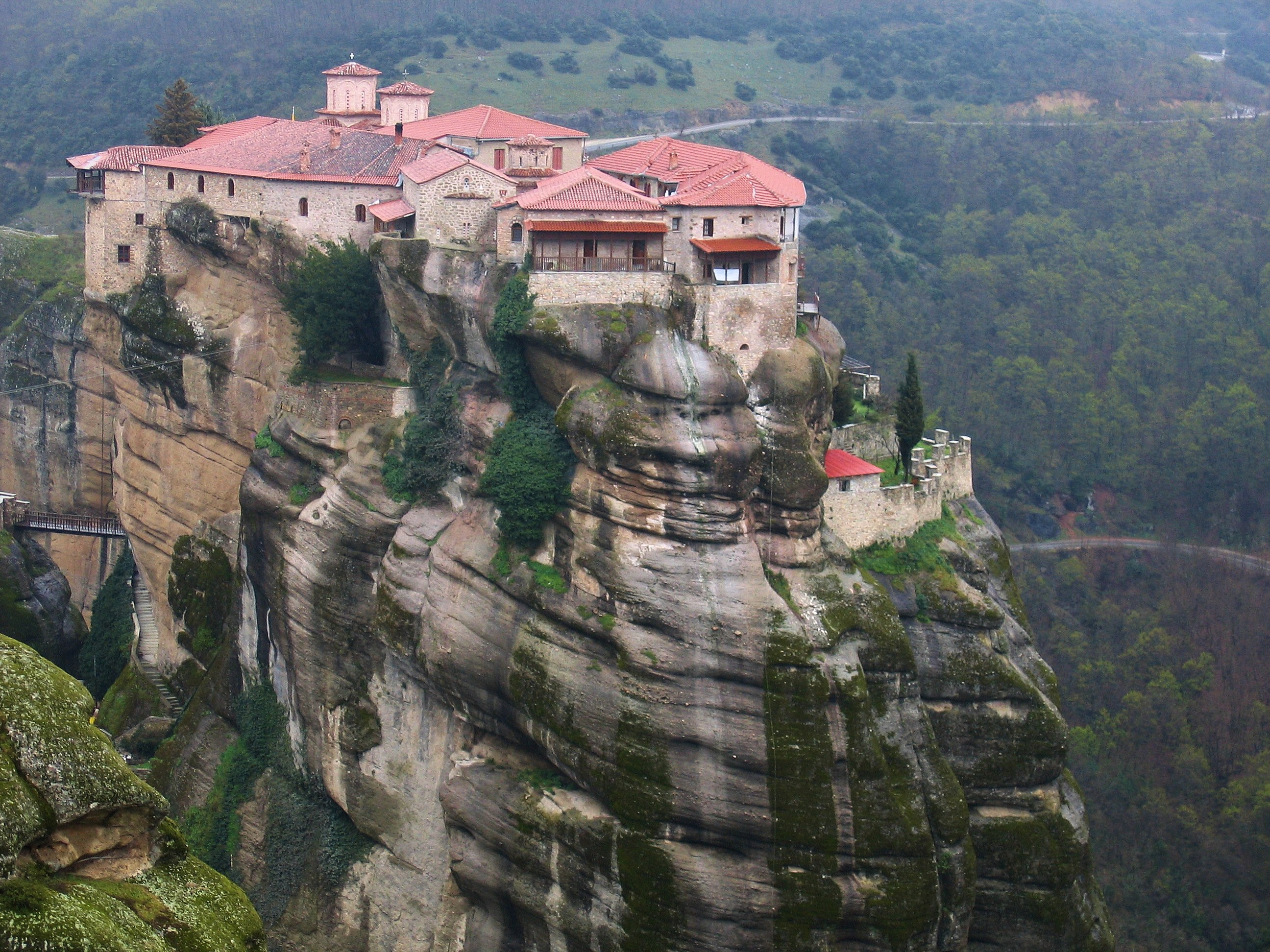
The Monastery of Varlaam in Meteora, Thessaly, Greece

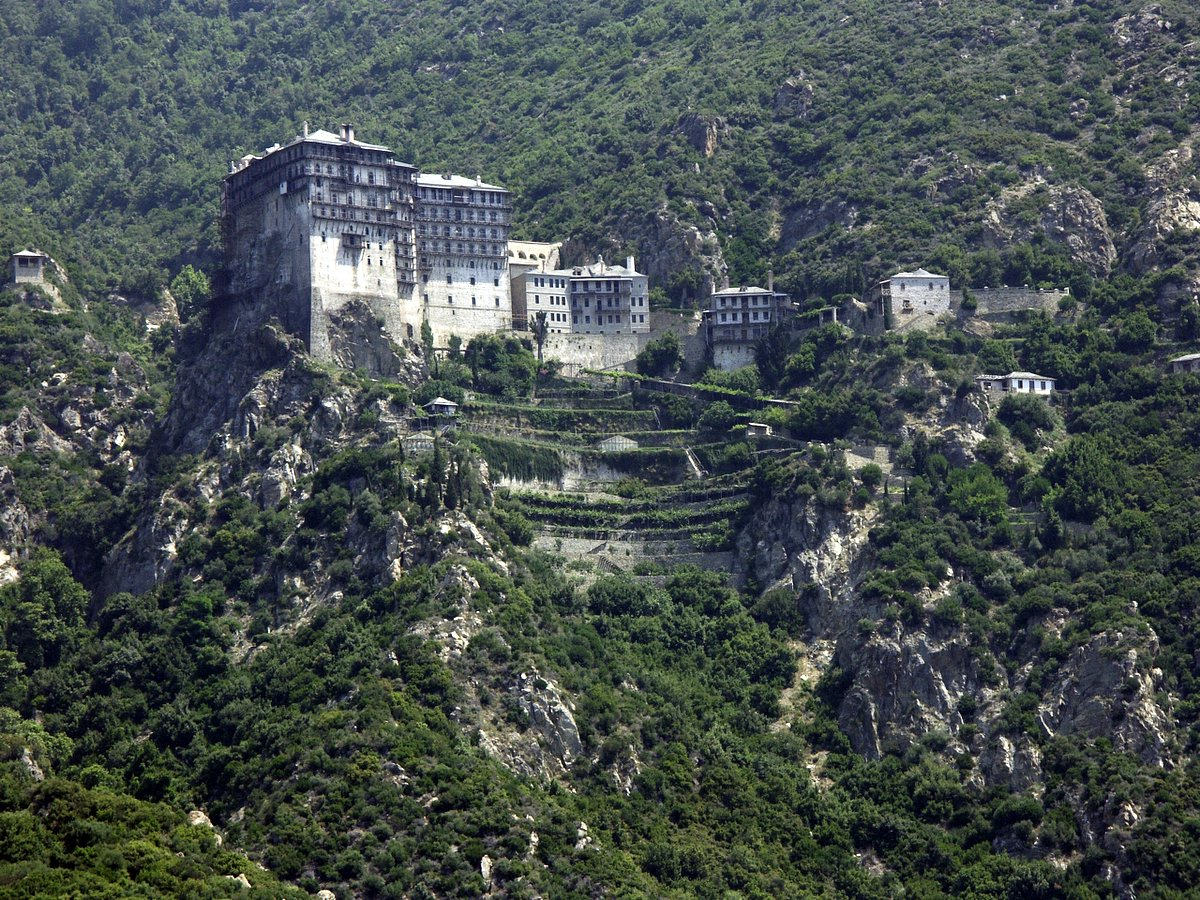
Mount Athos

In the Eastern Orthodox Church and Eastern Catholic Church, both monks and nuns follow a similar ascetic discipline, and even their religious habit is the same (though nuns wear an extra veil, called the apostolnik). Unlike Roman Catholic monasticism, the Eastern Orthodox do not have distinct religious orders, but a single monastic form throughout the Eastern Orthodox Church. Monastics, male or female, live away from the world, in order to pray for the world.

Monasteries vary from the very large to the very small. There are three types of monastic houses in the Eastern Orthodox Church:

- A cenobium is a monastic community where monks live together, work together, and pray together, following the directions of an abbot and the elder monks. The concept of the cenobitic life is that when many men (or women) live together in a monastic context, like rocks with sharp edges, their "sharpness" becomes worn away and they become smooth and polished. The largest monasteries can hold many thousands of monks and are called lavras. In the cenobium the daily office, work and meals are all done in common.
- A skete is a small monastic establishment that usually consist of one elder and two or three disciples. In the skete most prayer and work are done in private, coming together on Sundays and feast days. Thus, skete life has elements of both solitude and community, and for this reason is called the "middle way".
- A hermit is a monk who practises asceticism but lives in solitude rather than in a monastic community.

One of the great centres of Eastern Orthodox monasticism is Mount Athos in Greece, which, like Vatican City, is self-governing. It is located on an isolated peninsula approximately 20 miles (32 km) long and 5 miles (8.0 km) wide, and is administered by the heads of the 20 monasteries. Today the population of the Holy Mountain is around 2,200 men only and can only be visited by men with special permission granted by both the Greek government and the government of the Holy Mountain itself.

=== Oriental Orthodox ===
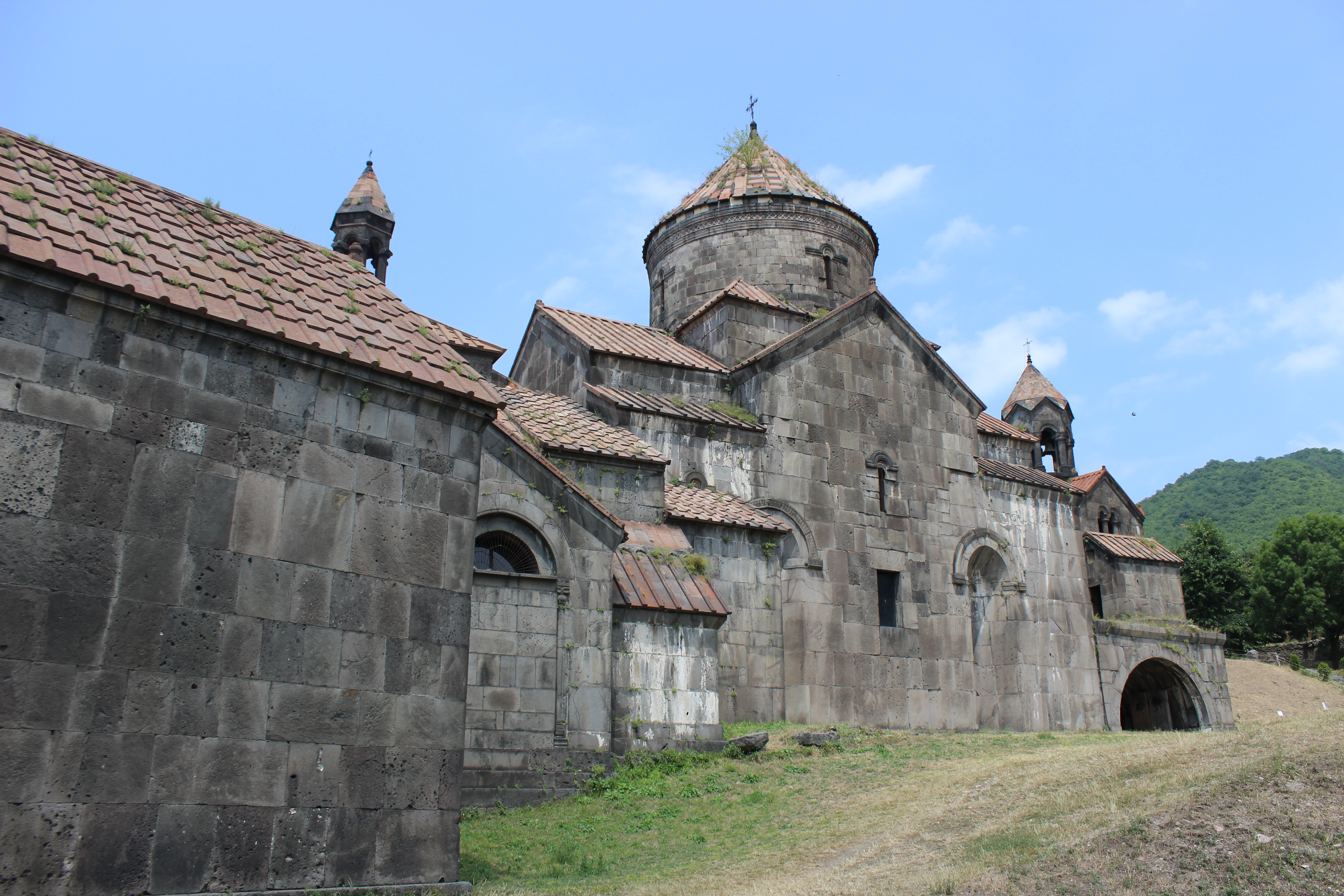
Haghpat Monastery, Armenia

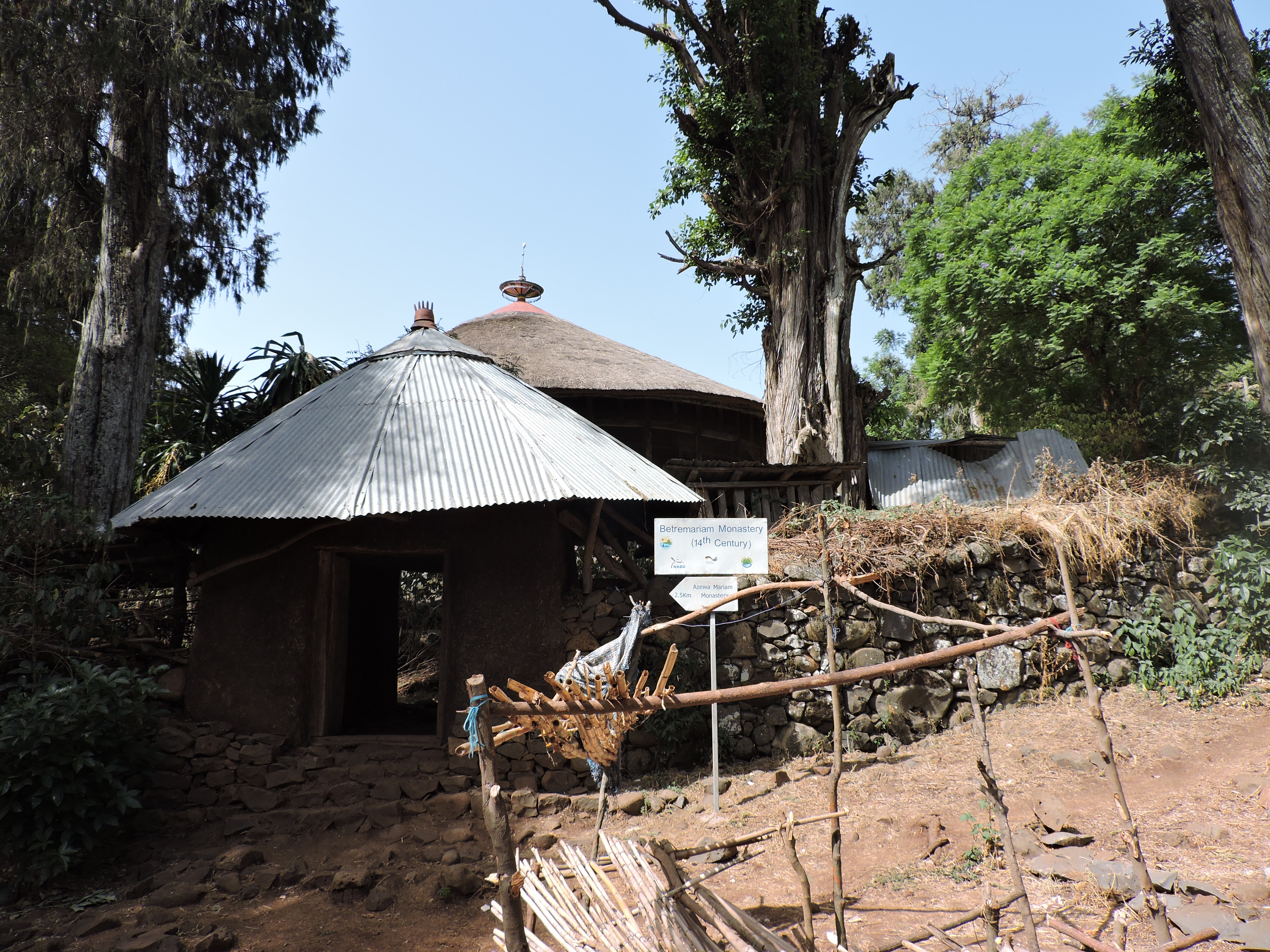
Betremariam Monastery (Tana)

The Oriental Orthodox churches, distinguished by their Miaphysite beliefs, consist of the Armenian Apostolic Church, Coptic Orthodox Church of Alexandria (whose Patriarch is considered first among equals for the following churches), Ethiopian Orthodox Tewahedo Church, Eritrean Orthodox Tewahedo Church, Indian Orthodox Church, and Syriac Orthodox Church of Antioch.

The monasteries of St. Macarius (Deir Abu Makaria) and St. Anthony (Deir Mar Antonios) are the oldest monasteries in the world and under the patronage of the Patriarch of the Coptic Orthodox Church.

=== Others ===
The last years of the 18th century marked in the Christian Church the beginnings of growth of monasticism among Protestant denominations. The center of this movement was in the United States and Canada beginning with the Shaker Church, which was founded in England and then moved to the United States. In the 19th century many of these monastic societies were founded as Utopian communities based on the monastic model in many cases. Aside from the Shakers, there were the Amana Colonies, the Anabaptists, and others. Many did allow marriage but most had a policy of celibacy and communal life in which members shared all things communally and disavowed personal ownership.

Among Conservative Anabaptists are the Bruderhof Communities, which have experienced extensive growth around the world.

Other Protestant Christian denominations also engage in monasticism, including other Reformed (Continental Reformed, Presbyterian and Congregationalist) denominations. In the 1960s, experimental monastic groups were formed in which both men and women were members of the same house and also were permitted to be married and have children – these were operated on a communal form.

=== Trends ===
There is a growing Christian neo-monasticism, particularly among evangelical Christians.

== Hinduism ==
=== Advaita Vedanta ===
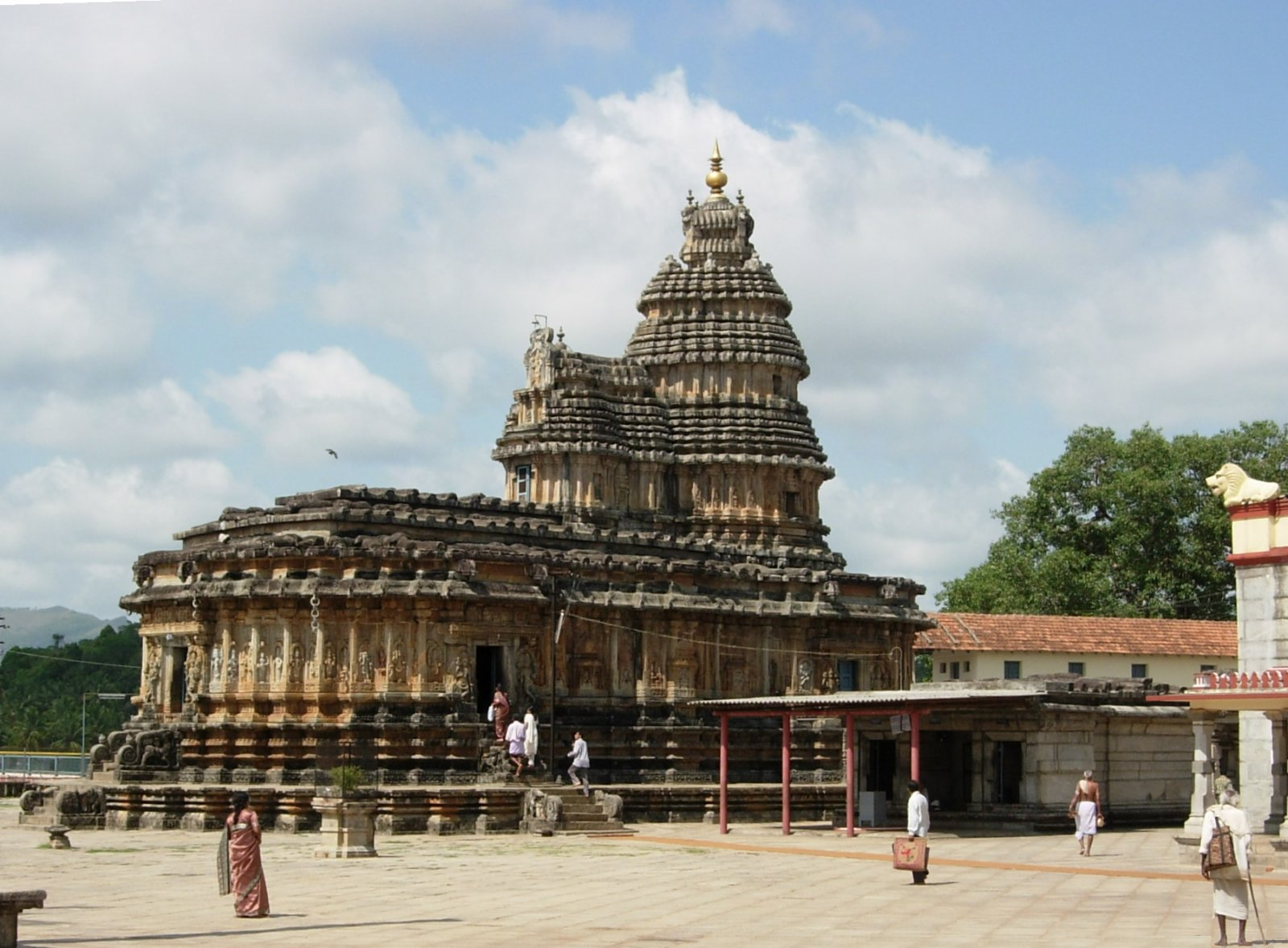
Hindu matha, Vidyasankara Temple

In Hinduism, monks have existed for a long time, and with them, their respective monasteries, called mathas. Important among them are the chatur-amnaya mathas established by Adi Shankara which formed the nodal centres of under whose guidance the ancient Order of Advaitin monks were re-organised under ten names of the Dashanami Sampradaya.

- Ramakrishna Math

=== Sri Vaishnava ===
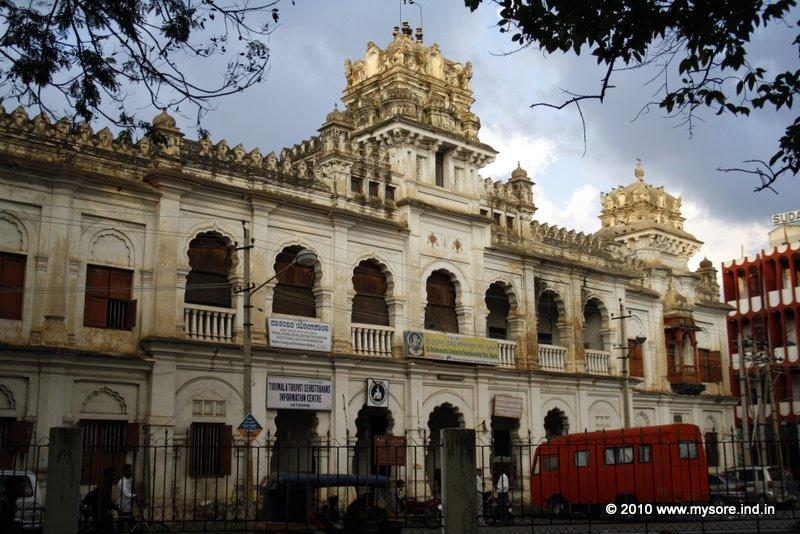
Parakala Mutt

Ramanuja heralded a new era in the world of Hinduism by reviving the lost faith in it and gave a firm doctrinal basis to the Vishishtadvaita philosophy which had existed since time immemorial. He ensured the establishment of a number of mathas of his Sri Vaishnava creed at different important centres of pilgrimage.

- Emar Matha at Puri
- Sriranga Narayana Jeeyar Mutt at Srirangam
- Tirumala Pedda Jeeyangar Mutt at Tirupati

Later on, other famous Sri Vaishnava theologians and religious heads established various important mathas such as

- Vanamamalai Mutt
- Parakala Mutt
- Ahobila Mutt

=== Nimbarka Vaishnava ===
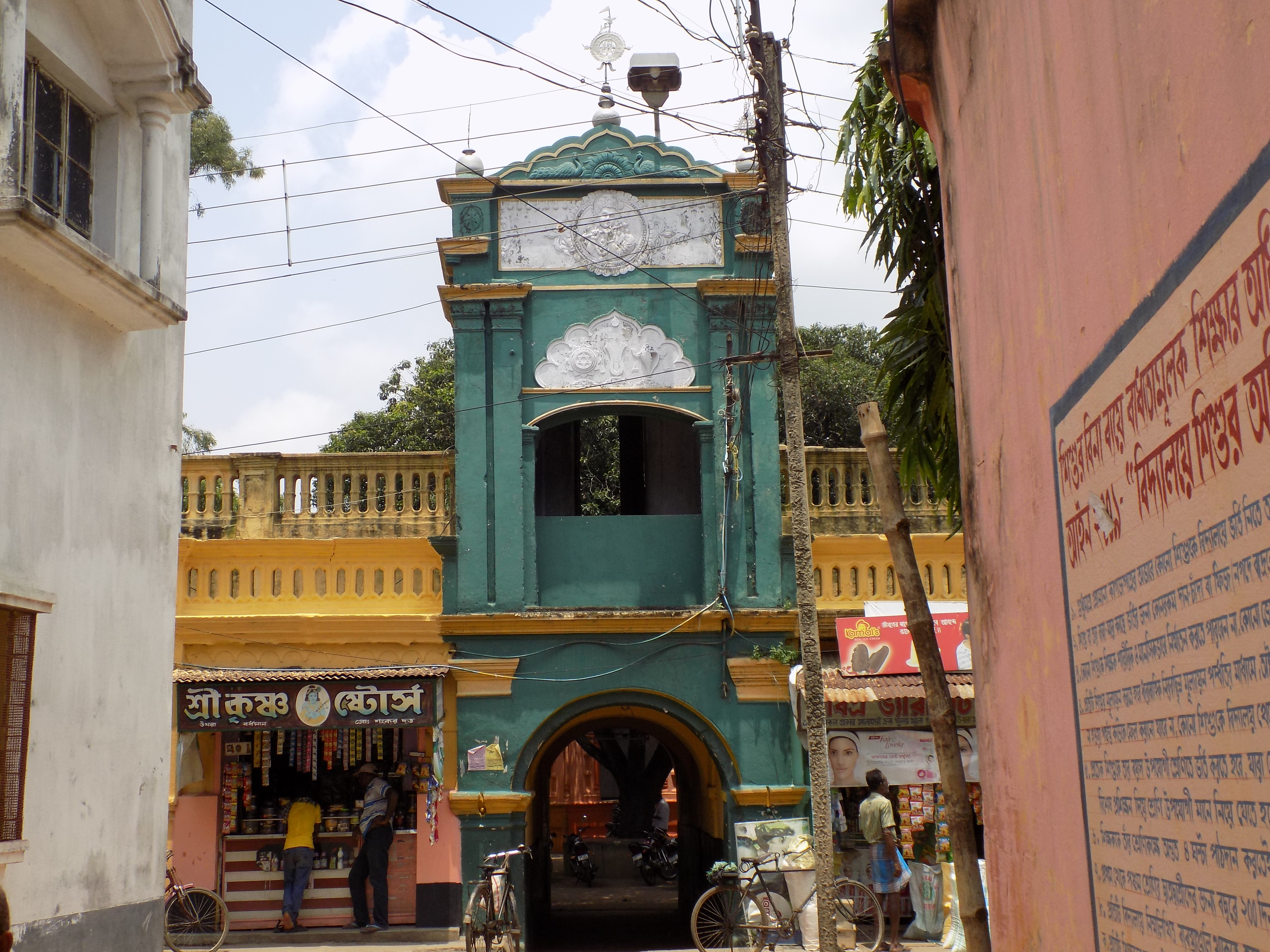
Ukhra Nimbarka Peeth Mahanta Asthal

Nimbarka Sampradaya of Nimbarkacharya is popular in North, West and East India and has several important Mathas.

- Nimbarakacharya Peeth at Salemabad, Rajasthan
- Kathia Baba ka Sthaan at Vrindavan
- Ukhra Mahanta Asthal at Ukhra in West Bengal
- Howrah Nimbarka Ashram at Howrah

=== Dvaita Vedanta ===
Ashta matha (eight monasteries) of Udupi were founded by Madhvacharya (Madhwa acharya), a dwaitha philosopher.

- Gaud Saraswat Math
- Kashi Math at Varanasi, Uttar Pradesh
- Gokarna Math at Canacona, Goa

== Jainism ==
Jainism, founded by Mahavira c. 570 BC, has had its own monasteries since the 5th century BC.

== Sufism ==
Islam discourages monasticism, which is referred to in the Quran as "an invention". However, the term "Sufi" is applied to Muslim mystics who, as a means of achieving union with Allah, adopted ascetic practices including wearing a garment made of coarse wool called "sūf". The term "Sufism" comes from "sūfī" meaning the person who wears "sūf". But in the course of time, Sufi has come to designate all Muslim believers in mystic union.

== Monasteries in literature ==
Matthew Lewis's 1796 gothic novel The Monk has as parts of its setting both a fictional monastery and nunnery in Spain at the time of the Inquisition. Many have interpreted Lewis's novel as a critique of Catholicism. Jane Austen sets the latter half of her 1818 novel Northanger Abbey in an out of use monastery, reflecting on Henry VIII's abolition of monasticism in England and the contemporary abolition of monasticism in France in the wake of the French Revolution. Convents for female monastics, or nunneries, were often portrayed as punishments for women unable or unwilling to marry.

In the 1880 novel The Brothers Karamazov, Fyodor Dostoyevsky was inspired by real-life accounts of Orthodox monasticism. Parts of the novel focus in particular on the controversy surrounding the institution of "elderhood" in Orthodox monasticism. Dostoyevsky's understanding of the tradition of elderhood is taken largely from Life of Elder Leonid of Optina by Father Kliment Zeder-gol'm, from which he quotes directly in chapter 5, book 1 of the Brother's Karamazov.

The 1980 historical novel The Name of the Rose, by Italian author, philosopher, and semiotician Umberto Eco, is set in a monastery in Italy in the year 1327, and the book creates a tableau of monastic life in the 14th century. It is an intellectual murder mystery; said to be a postmodernist work, combining metanarrative and semiotics with biblical analysis and medieval studies. The narrative itself takes place at a Benedictine abbey during the controversy regarding the doctrines about the absolute poverty of Christ and apostolic poverty between branches of the Franciscan and Dominican orders. The setting was inspired by the monumental Saint Michael's Abbey in Susa Valley, Piedmont.

== See also ==
- Convent
- Dissolution of the monasteries
- Ecovillage
- Intentional community
- Khanqah
- Krishnapura matha
- List of abbeys and priories
- List of Buddhist temples
- List of monasteries of the Ukrainian Orthodox Church (Moscow Patriarchate)
- Monasticism
- Mount Athos
- New Monasticism
- Pilgrimage
- Religious order
- Rota (architecture)
- Shivalli
- Suppression of monasteries
- Taoism
- Thomas Merton
- Vihara
- Wudangshan
- Zawiya
