= Evangelical Sisterhood of Mary =

Lutheran religious order in Germany

Coordinates: 49°49′49″N 8°38′37″E

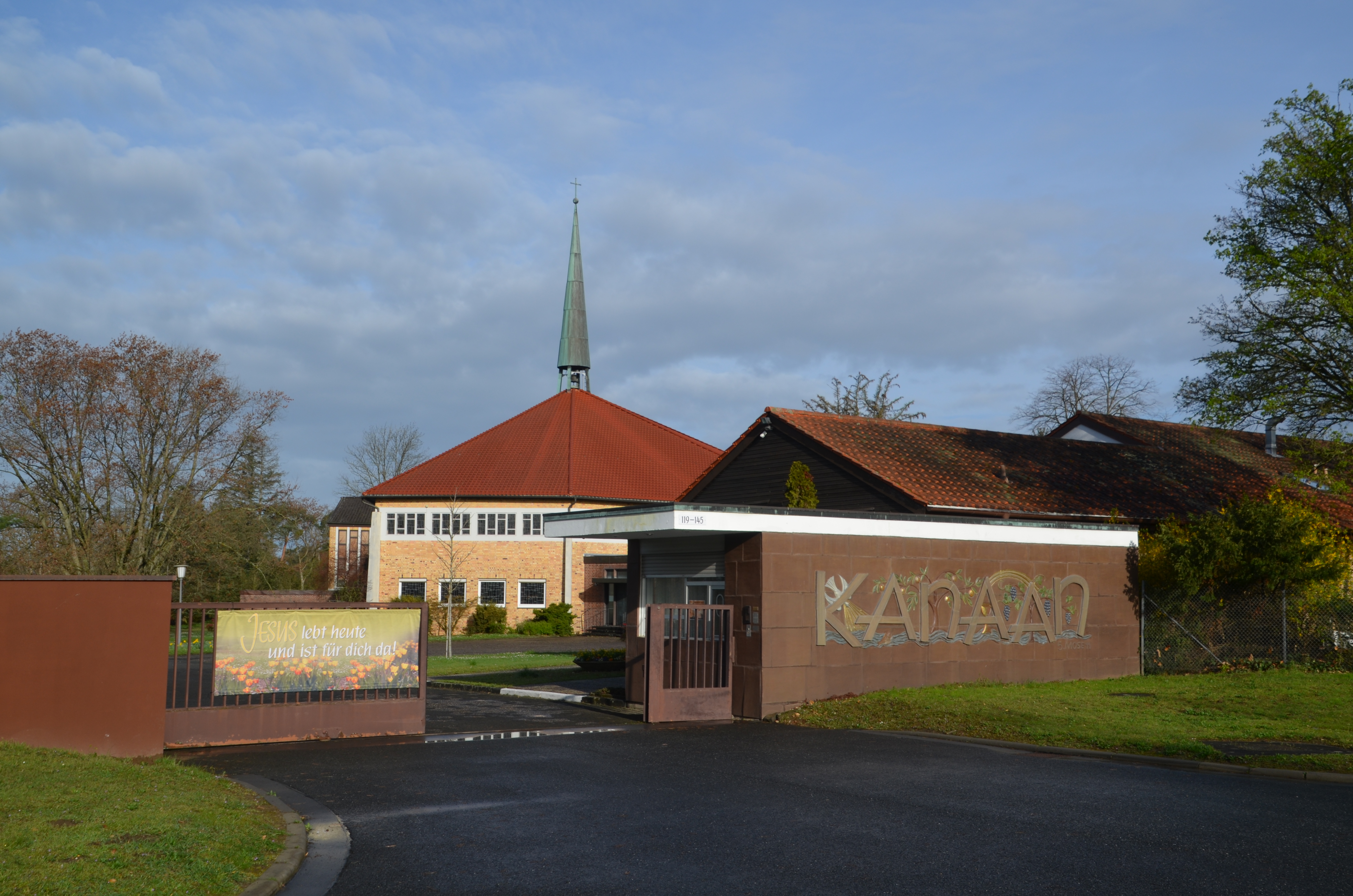
Entrance today

The Evangelical Sisterhood of Mary is an ecumenical, Lutheran based, religious order, founded in 1947 by Mother Basilea Schlink and Mother Martyria Madauss in Darmstadt, Germany. The members of the community live and work on the grounds known as “Kanaan.”

== Founding ==
The Sisterhood of Mary was founded in the post-war period on 30 March 1947 following a spiritual revival among young people. It was established by Mother Basilea (Dr. Klara Schlink), together with Mother Martyria (Erika Madauss) and the Methodist superintendent Paul Riedinger, who also gave the two women their religious names.

In the years that followed, the sisters built their motherhouse and the motherhouse chapel themselves using rubble stones from buildings destroyed in Darmstadt during the war.

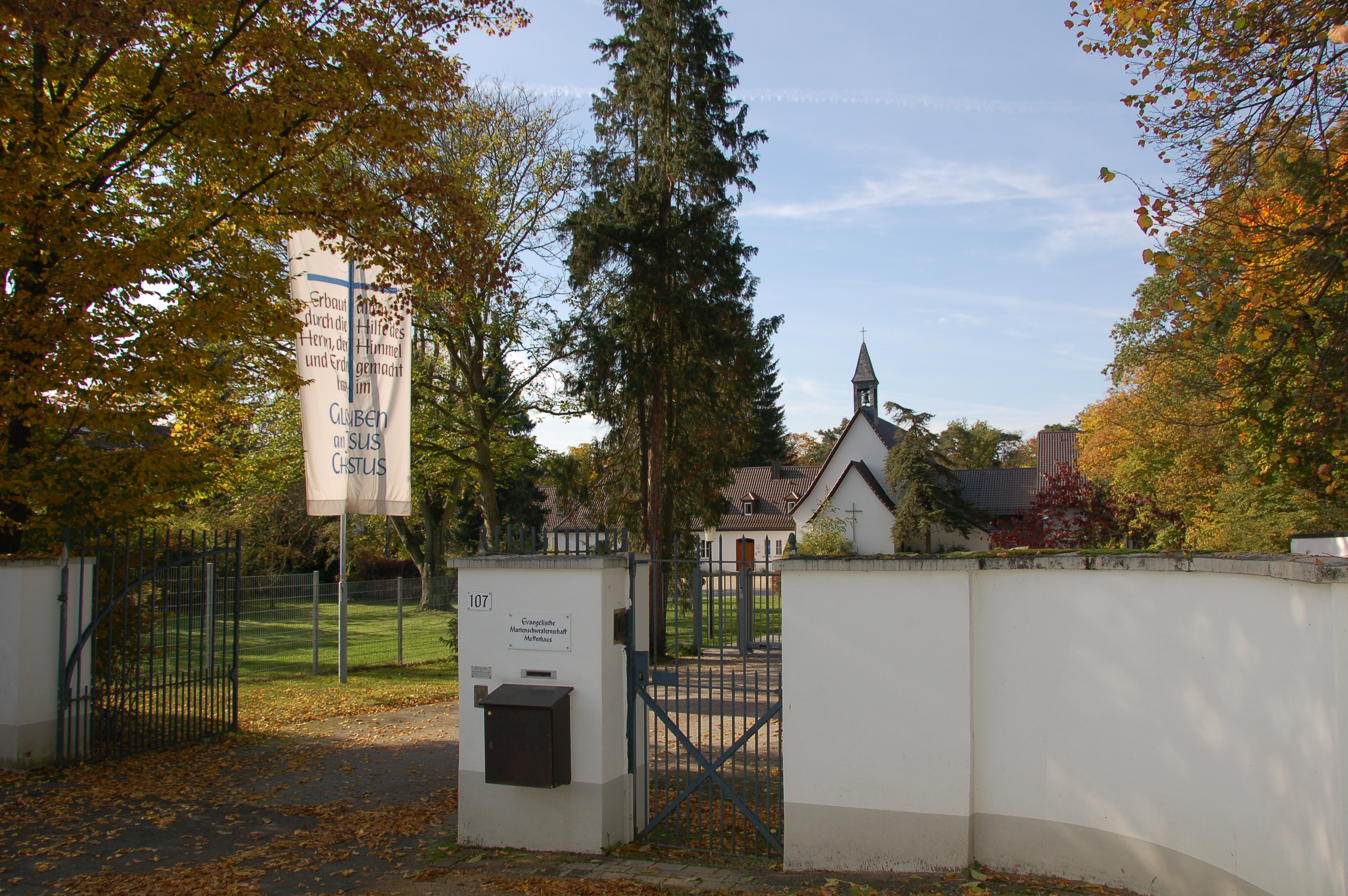
Entrance to Motherhouse Chapel and Reception

After completing her education and studies, Klara Schlink returned to Darmstadt together with Erika Madauss, responding to what she believed to be a call from Jesus. The expected promise of Bible courses did not materialize as anticipated, resulting in several years of waiting. During the Second World War, their ministry in girls’ Bible groups in Darmstadt continued and led to a revival following the destruction of the city during the bombing night of 11–12 September 1944. Despite the difficult living conditions in the aftermath of the war, youth work expanded. For many participants, the Christian faith and their relationship with Jesus gained new personal significance. As a result of this revival, the first seven sisters were formally received into the community in 1947.

== Franciscan Brothers ==
Since 1967 the Evangelical Kanaan Franciscan Brotherhood has been affiliated with the Sisterhood of Mary. This small community also lives on the Kanaan grounds.

Their spiritual model is Francis of Assisi, whom Mother Basilea said she had encountered inwardly several years before the founding of the sisterhood.

The brothers follow the guidelines of the community, whose central maxim is: “Repent, for the kingdom of heaven is near.” Through their communal life they seek to make visible something of the reality of the Kingdom of God, to the glory of God.

== Spirituality ==
The Evangelical Sisters of Mary are named after Mary, mother of Jesus, who accompanied her son in love and faithfulness from the manger to the cross. Her unconditional devotion and trusting obedience are regarded as a spiritual model for the community. The sisters also follow the evangelical counsels of obedience, poverty, and chastity.

From the beginning the community has followed what it calls the “path of faith,” described especially in the book Realities – Experiencing God’s Work Today by Mother Basilea. The sisters and brothers rely on the providence of the Heavenly Father in all areas of their lives.

Plaques of Mother Basilea in the Holy Land

From an early stage Mother Basilea emphasized the importance of repentance on behalf of the crimes of National Socialism, particularly within the initially German sisterhood. Reflection on Germany’s history of guilt led to a movement of repentance and prayer with regard to the Jewish people and the State of Israel. In this context the book Israel – My People was published in 1958. In 1961 the first branch house was established in Jerusalem under the name Beit Avraham. For fifty years this house served as a place where Jewish people, especially those who had suffered in concentration camps, could find a time of rest and recovery. As the survivor population aged, and those still living too frail to come visit, In 2014, the sisters decided it was time to close the house. Since the house was in need of extensive renovation, the property was sold, and the sisters relocated to a smaller residence in Ein Karem. The sisterhood continues to pray regularly for Israel; intercessory prayer is held each week at the beginning of the Sabbath.

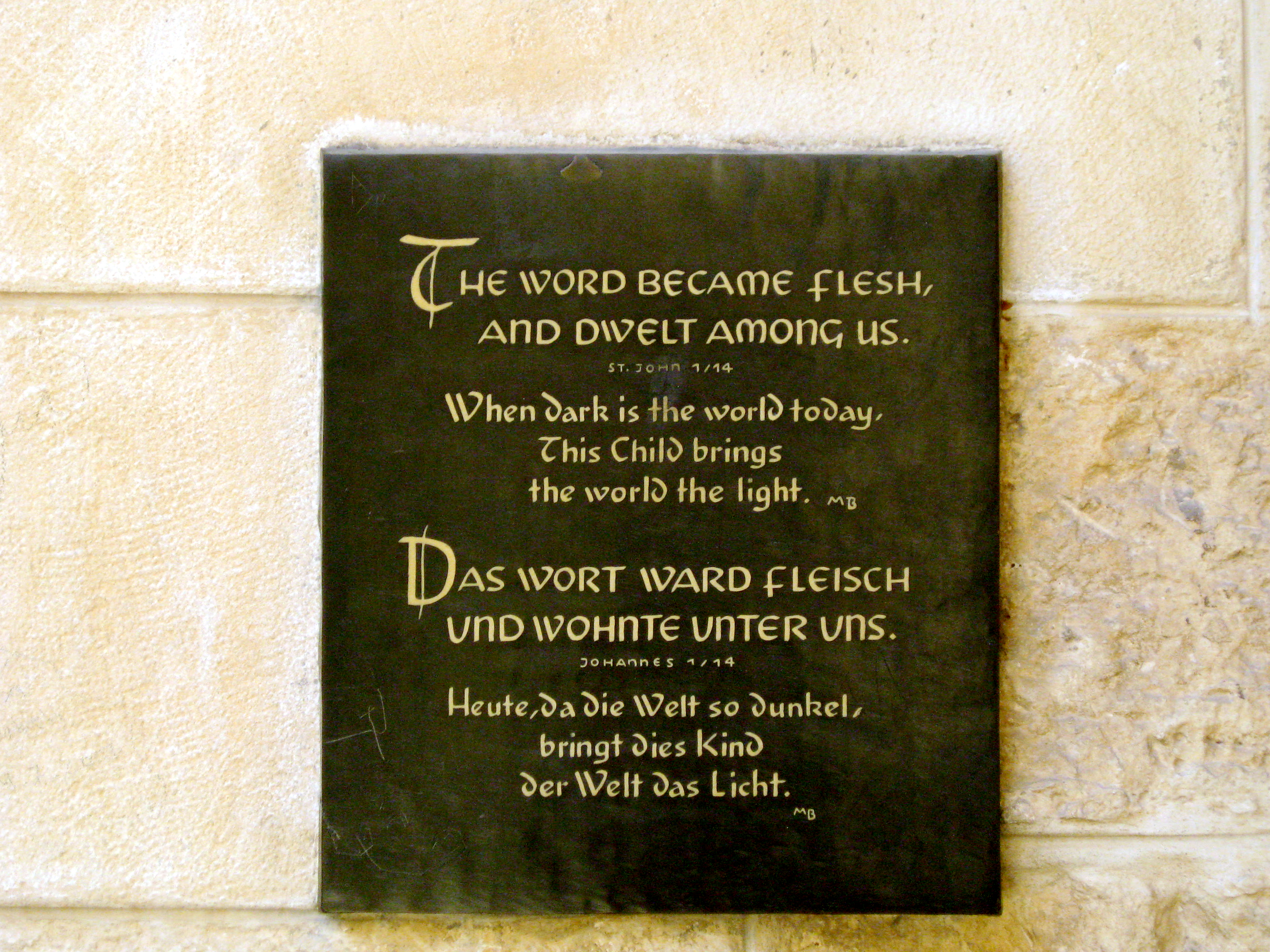
Devotional plaque in Bethlehem

Over several decades, the Sisterhood placed devotional plaques in various pilgrimage sites — such as the Mount of Beatitudes, Tabgha, the Via Dolorosa in Jerusalem — bearing biblical verses and short meditations. These plaques are signed with the initials “MB” (for Mutter Basilea), and serve as silent witnesses of faith, repentance, and reconciliation.

A fixed element of spiritual life on Kanaan is the daily prayer at 3 p.m., the traditional hour of the death of Jesus Christ. Meditation on the Passion of Jesus occupies a central place in the spirituality of the sisterhood and is the subject of several writings by Mother Basilea. The sisters seek to bring comfort to Jesus Christ through their way of life.

Another characteristic aspect of the sisterhood’s spirituality is its emphasis on worship. This is expressed, among other things, in the publication of worship songs. The community also seeks to offer public praise to God in nature. In this context, the sisterhood distributes so-called “praise boards” worldwide—plaques placed outdoors with Bible verses and lines from hymns pointing to the Creator. The community also maintains praise chapels in Switzerland.

== Locations ==
The motherhouse of the Evangelical Sisterhood of Mary is located on Heidelberger Landstraße in Darmstadt-Eberstadt. It stands on an approximately nine-hectare site called “Kanaan,” a reference to the land promised by God to Abraham and his descendants (Genesis 12).

The grounds contain symbolic references to biblical places, including the Sea of Galilee, the Jordan River, Jacob’s Well, Mount Tabor, and a Bethlehem grotto. A central feature is the “Garden of Jesus’ Suffering,” which depicts stations from the Passion of Jesus. Similar gardens of the Passion can also be visited at other branch locations.

Kanaan is open daily to visitors from 9 a.m. to 6 p.m. and is intended as a place of silence, prayer, and encounter with Jesus.

In addition to the motherhouse, the community maintains branches with smaller Kanaan centers in several countries, including Australia, Brazil, Finland, the United Kingdom, Israel, Canada, Norway, Paraguay, Switzerland, and the United States.

== See also ==
- Religion in Germany
- Christianity in Germany
- Protestantism in Germany

== Sources ==
- Evangelical Sisterhood of Mary, History
