= Edmund Schlink =

German theologian (1903–1984)

Edmund Schlink (3 March 1903 – 20 May 1984) was a German-Lutheran pastor and theologian. Between 1946 and his retirement in 1971 he was a professor of dogmatic and ecumenical theology at Heidelberg University.

== Biography ==
Schlink was born in Darmstadt, near where his father, Wilhelm Schlink, was a professor of mechanics and aeronautics. The family of his mother, Ella, had been influenced by Herrnhut pietism. His only sibling, his sister Klara (1904-2001), who later called herself Mutter Basilea Schlink, became a popular religious writer and leader. In 1906, the Schlink family moved to Braunschweig, where Wilhelm served as a professor aeronautics. Edmund Schlink attended public schools in Braunschweig. In 1922 he matriculated at Tübingen University, where he studied mathematics, philosophy, psychology, physics, and other natural sciences. He also attended the universities of Munich, Kiel, Vienna, and Marburg. He completed his first Ph.D. dissertation (in religious psychology) at Marburg in 1927. This dissertation explores personality changes in people who undergo a religious conversion and in those who are suffering from clinical depression. During the prior year (1926), he himself had undergone a religious conversion after suffering a crisis of faith. As a result of this experience, he changed his academic focus to theology, which he studied at the University of Münster. There he wrote his second dissertation (on a problem in natural theology), under the direction of Karl Barth. He then served as an assistant pastor to congregations in Buchschlag and Sprendlingen, and in the fall of 1932 he became a campus pastor at the Technical University of Darmstadt. In 1934 he completed his third dissertation, his post-doctoral theological thesis (Habilitationsschrift), which was accepted at the University of Giessen. This post-doctoral thesis in theological anthropology examines how human beings have been understood in the preaching of the church.

As a member of the Confessing Church, Schlink supported the Barmen Declaration. He later interpreted this confession favorably in light of several key teachings in the Book of Concord, especially the distinction between law and gospel. Because of pressure from the Gestapo, which he and his superiors received as a result of his public criticism of the German Christians (Deutsche Christen), Schlink was removed from his teaching position at Giessen. Between 1935 and 1939 he taught at the seminary in Bethel, near Bielefeld (see also Bethel Foundation). After the Gestapo closed that seminary in 1939 and restricted Schlink's speaking and public movement, Schlink began serving as a pastor to several "confessing" congregations in Hesse and Westphalia. These included the Marienkirche and St. Reinoldikirche in Dortmund and eventually the Neustädter Marienkirche in Bielefeld. During 1943 and 1944, he also traveled monthly to Strasbourg for two-week periods in which he taught practical theology to seminarians there. In 1945 he became the director of the preachers' seminary in Soest for the Evangelical Church of Westphalia. After only a year there, he was called to become a professor of dogmatic and ecumenical theology at Heidelberg University. He would remain a member of this faculty until his retirement in 1971.

Schlink was married twice. His first wife, Elisabeth Winkelmann, with whom he had two daughters, died in 1936. He married his second wife, Irmgard Oswald (1914-2006), in 1938. They had two sons, Wilhelm Schlink (d. 2018) who was an art historian, and Bernhard Schlink, who is a lawyer and novelist. Schlink's daughter, Dorothea (d. 2019), was the wife of the former bishop of the Protestant Church in Baden, Klaus Engelhardt, who was also a former chairman of the council of the Evangelical Church in Germany.

== Theological and ecumenical work ==
Shortly after his arrival at Heidelberg in 1946, Schlink founded an ecumenical institute there, the first of its kind at a German university. That same year he helped to begin the first bi-lateral dialogue between Lutheran and Roman-Catholic theologians in Germany. This Ecumenical Working Group of Protestant and Catholic Theologians is the longest lasting such dialogue in history. This Working Group helped to improve ecumenical relations between the Lutheran World Federation and the Roman Catholic Church. In addition to encouraging dialogue among Christians, Schlink also supported inter-disciplinary discussions between theologians and scientists. Elected rector of Heidelberg University for the 1953-54 academic year, Schlink's rector's speech was the initial essay in the inaugural issue of the journal, Kerygma und Dogma. For many years he served as an editor of this journal. Between 1955 and his death, he also helped to edit another important theological journal, Ökumenische Rundschau.

Schlink was very involved in the World Council of Churches (WCC). He served as a leading figure on its Faith and Order Commission. He was a delegate to the first assembly of the WCC in Amsterdam (1948), as well as to the assemblies in Evanston (1954), New Delhi (1961), and Uppsala (1968). At the second assembly, he delivered the first keynote address, "Christ--The Hope for the World." Through his ecumenical work with Eastern Orthodox theologians, Schlink helped to bring the Russian Orthodox Church into the WCC in 1961.

Between 1962 and 1965 he was the official representative of the Evangelical Church in Germany to the Second Vatican Council. At the start of the first session of the council, he was selected by the official non-Catholic observers to serve as one of their official spokesmen. When Cardinal Augustin Bea hosted a formal reception for these non-Catholic observers at the start of the first session, Schlink was chosen to give the official response on behalf of all observers. His book on the whole council, After the Council, was among the first to be published by a non-Catholic author.

Schlink's study of Christian baptism was a major resource for the WCC's ground-breaking document, Baptism, Eucharist, and Ministry. His 804-page Ecumenical Dogmatics, which contains prefaces by both a Roman-Catholic theologian (Heinrich Fries) and an Eastern Orthodox one (Nikos Nissiotis), "seeks to overcome basic dogmatic misunderstandings among the churches and to identify essential convergences in an effort to pave the way toward visible reunion of broken Christendom."

Schlink was given honorary doctorates from three universities: the University of Mainz (1947), the University of Edinburgh (1953), and the Institute de Théologie Orthodoxe Saint-Serge Paris (1962; see St. Sergius Orthodox Theological Institute).

Schlink supervised numerous doctoral and post-doctoral dissertations by individuals who went on to become important theologians in their own right. Among them were Wolfhart Pannenberg.

== Books in English ==
- The Victor Speaks, trans. Paul F. Koehneke (St. Louis: Concordia, 1958)
- Theology of the Lutheran Confessions, trans. Paul F. Koehneke and Herbert J. A. Bouman (St. Louis: Concordia, 1961; reprinted six times)
- The Vision of the Pope, trans. Eugene Skibbe (Minneapolis: Kirk House, 2001)
- Edmund Schlink Works (ESW), vol. 1, Confessional and Ecumenical Writings, ed. Matthew L. Becker, trans. Matthew L. Becker and Hans G. Spalteholz (Göttingen: Vandenhoeck & Ruprecht, 2017 [Bk 1: The Coming Christ and Church Tradition; Bk 2: After the Council])
- Edmund Schlink Works (ESW), vol. 2, Ecumenical Dogmatics, ed. Matthew L. Becker, trans. Matthew L. Becker et al. (Göttingen: Vandenhoeck & Ruprecht, 2023 [2 books that comprise one volume])
- Edmund Schlink Works (ESW), vol. 3, The Doctrine of Baptism, ed. Matthew L. Becker, trans. Matthew L. Becker and Eleanor Wegener (Göttingen: Vandenhoeck & Ruprecht, 2025)

== Bibliography ==
- Edmund Schlink, Schriften zu Ökumene und Bekenntnis, 5 vols., ed. Klaus Engelhardt et al. (Göttingen: Vandenhoeck & Ruprecht, 2004-2010; the ET of these volumes is ESW, see above)
- Matthew L. Becker, "Edmund Schlink's Ecumenical Dogmatics,'' Lutheran Quarterly 36 (Spring 2022), 1-26
- Margarethe Hopf, Ein Osservatore Romano fuer die Evangelische Kirche in Deutschland: Der Konzilsbeobachter Edmund Schlink im Spannungsfeld der Interessen (Göttingen: Vandenhoeck & Ruprecht, 2022)
- Matthew L. Becker, "Edmund Schlink: Ecumenical Theology," in Generous Orthodoxies: Essays on the History and Future of Ecumenical Theology, ed. Paul Silas Peterson, 23-41 (Eugene: Pickwick, 2020)
- Matthew L. Becker, "Christ in the University: Edmund Schlink’s Vision,” The Cresset 80 (Easter 2017), 12-21
- Matthew L. Becker, "Edmund Schlink (1903–1984),” in Twentieth-Century Lutheran Theologians, ed. Mark Mattes, 195–222 (Göttingen: Vandenhoeck & Ruprecht, 2013)
- Matthew L. Becker, "Edmund Schlink on Theological Anthropology, the Law, and the Gospel", Lutheran Quarterly 24 (Summer 2010), 151–82
- Eugene M. Skibbe, A Quiet Reformer: An Introduction to Edmund Schlink's Life and Ecumenical Theology, (Minneapolis: Kirk House, 1999)
- Jochen Eber, Einheit der Kirche als dogmatisches Problem bei Edmund Schlink (Göttingen: Vandenhoeck & Ruprecht, 1993)
- Gerhard Schwenzer, Die Grossen Taten Gottes und die Kirche: Zur Ekklesiologie Edmund Schlinks (Paderborn: Bonifacius, 1969)
