= Basilea Schlink =

German Lutheran religious leader and writer

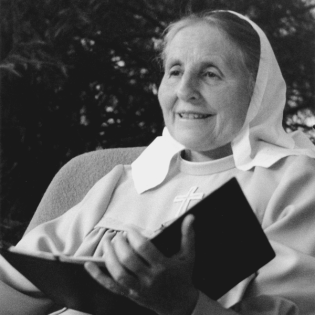
Mother Basilea Schlink

Mother Basilea Schlink, born Klara Schlink (October 21, 1904 in Darmstadt, Germany – March 21, 2001 in Darmstadt) was a Lutheran German religious leader and writer. She was leader of the Evangelical Sisterhood of Mary, which she cofounded, from 1947 to 2001.

== Life ==
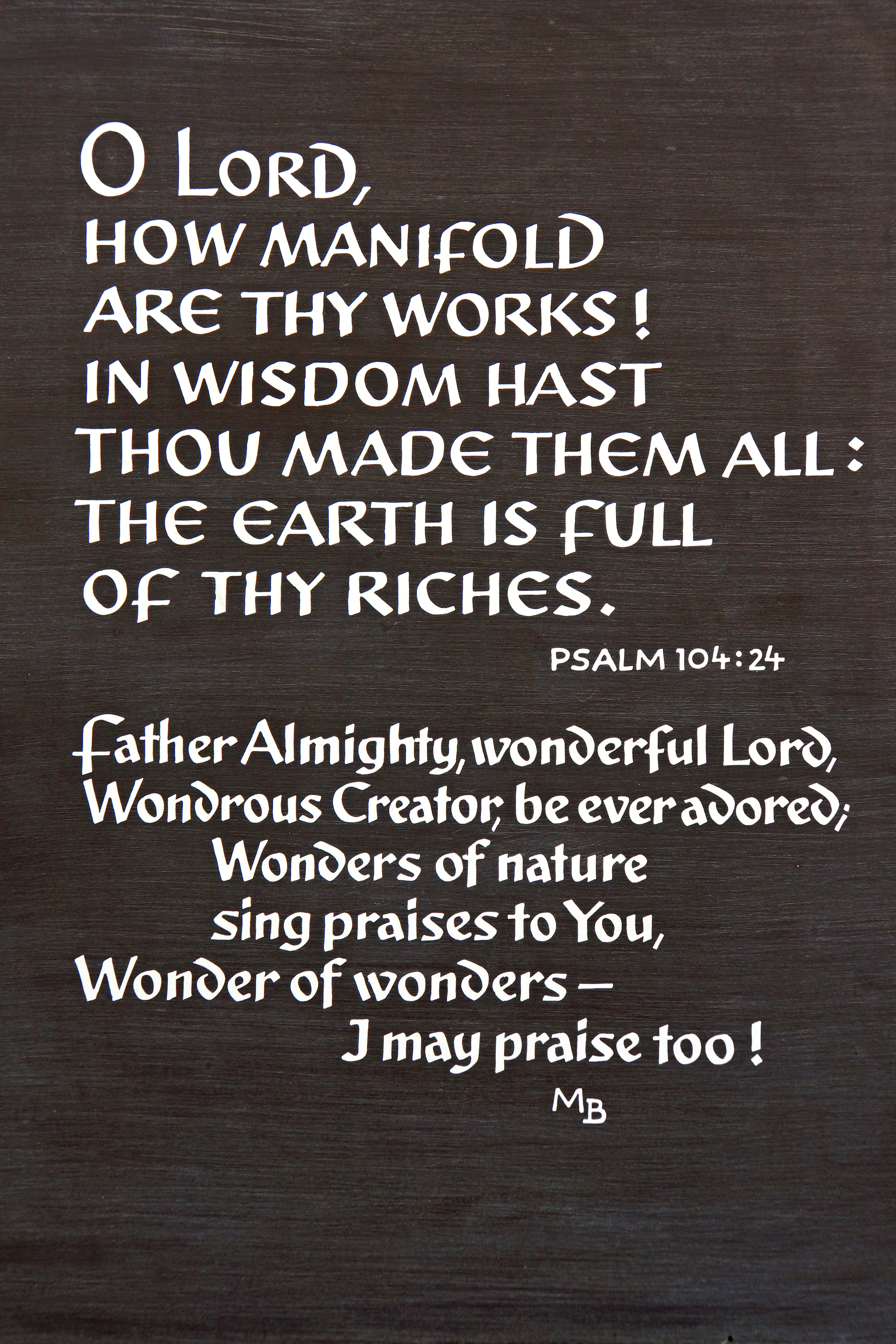
Plaque at the summit of Klein Matterhorn

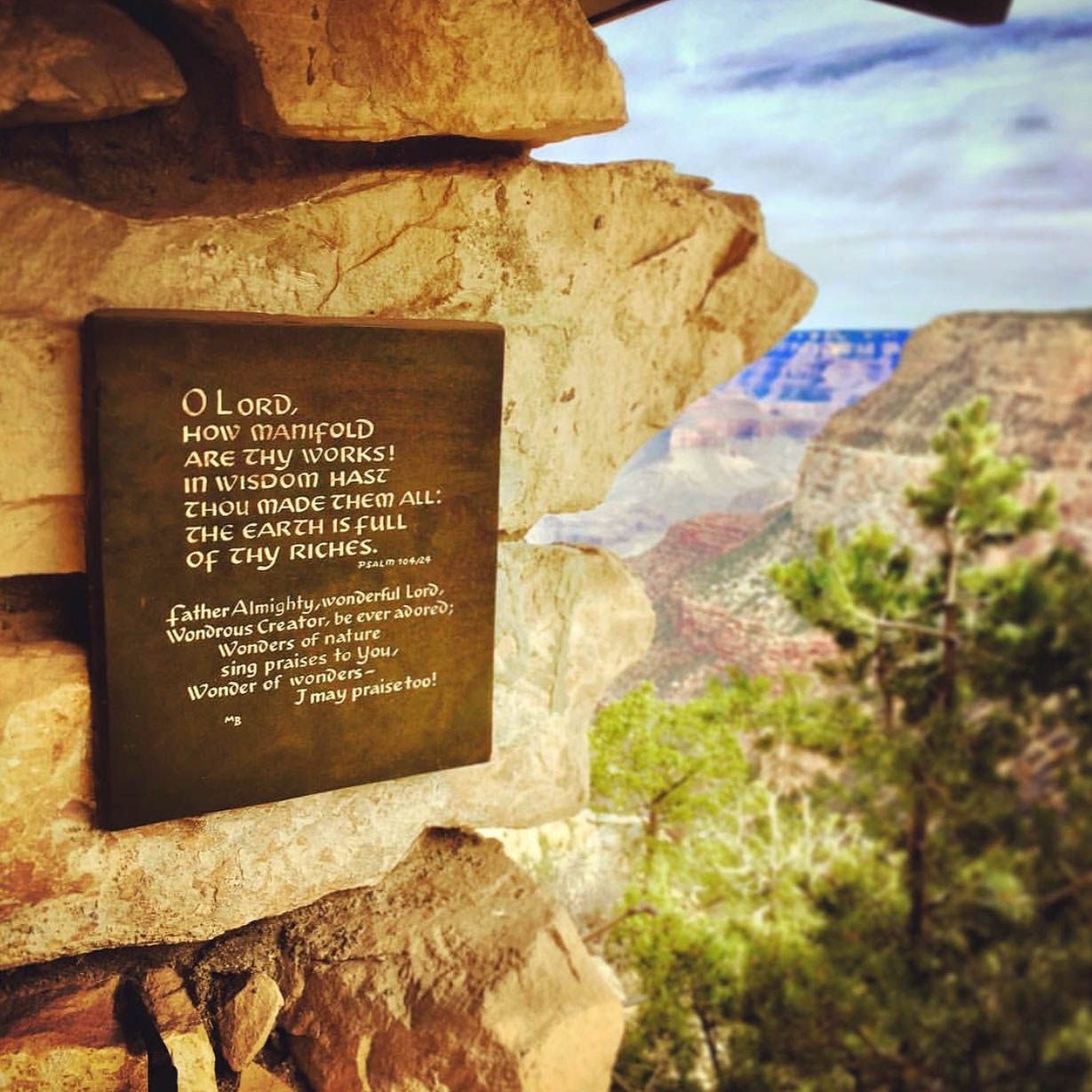
Plaque in the Grand Canyon

After finishing high school in Braunschweig and Darmstadt, she was educated (from 1923) at the Fröbelseminar in Kassel, and from 1924 at the Inner missions girls' school in Berlin. In 1929 she became a teacher at the Mission House Malche in Bad Freienwalde (Oder) in German, psychology and church history. After matriculation in 1930 she studied psychology, art history and philosophy in Berlin and Hamburg. This study was completed by a religious-psychologic thesis for her doctorate in psychology about “Consciousness of Sin in adolescent girls and its significance for their battle of faith.”

Mother Basilea was the sister of the theology professor Edmund Schlink. Her father, Wilhelm Schlink, was a professor of mechanics. She was also the aunt of the writer Bernhard Schlink.

== Evangelical Sisterhood of Mary ==
On March 30, 1947, she and Erika Madauss founded The Evangelical Sisterhood of Mary in Darmstadt. In 1948 both the founders and the first seven sisters received the religious habit. From then on, Dr. Klara Schlink was called Mother Basilea and Erika Madaus was called Mother Martyria. Today, The Evangelical Sisterhood of Mary has 11 subdivisions all over the world.

They were supported during the preparatory period and in the first years by the Methodist superintendent Paul Riedinger, who died in 1949. Together with the first sisters, Mother Basilea and Mother Martyria developed the “Kanaan” grounds near Heidelberger Landstraße in Darmstadt-Eberstadt. The first building to be constructed was the Motherhouse Chapel, which was built from rubble stones taken from war-destroyed Darmstadt by the sisters.

== Ministry ==
Encouraged by the circle of friends associated with the Evangelical Sisters of Mary, Mother Basilea began to publish texts from her preaching ministry during the war years. From this developed a growing publishing work; her books and booklets are available in various languages. The so-called “book marks,” concise key statements intended for evangelistic purposes, were translated into 100 languages.

Through her writings, songs, and the ministry of the sisterhood, Mother Basilea became an influential spiritual voice. Her message is directed to people seeking a deeper relationship with God the Father and with Jesus Christ, and emphasizes themes such as following Christ in love for Jesus, repentance and contrition, the return of Jesus, God’s plan of salvation with Israel, and a return to the “first, bridal love” for Jesus.

From an early stage, Mother Basilea was committed to reconciliation between Jews and Christians and to support for the Jewish people. After she refused, in her role as “Reich Leader of the German Christian Women Students’ Movement,” to exclude Jewish-Christian students in accordance with the Aryan paragraph, she was reported twice—in 1933 and 1935—and interrogated by the Gestapo. Despite the risks involved, she continued her preaching ministry and spoke of Israel and the Jews as God’s chosen people with a special calling among the nations.

In the early 1950s, engagement within the community with reports about the liberation of the concentration camps led to a deepened repentance over the guilt of the German people toward the Jews. In this context, the book Israel – My People was published in 1958. In 1961, the first branch in the Holy Land, “Beit Avraham,” was established.

== Books ==
- Bride of Jesus Christ
- My All for Him
- Fragrance of a Life for God
- Israel, My Chosen People
- Those Who Love Him, 1969 Grand Rapids, MI: Zondervan Publishing House (LCCN 69-11639)
- You Will Never Be the Same, 1972
- Let me stand at Your side, 1975
- Patmos – When the Heavens Opened, 1976
- Repentance – The Joy-Filled Life
- Father of comfort (Daily Reflections on the God Who Cares)
- The Hidden Treasure in Suffering (1983 first German edition, 1992 British edition by Kanaan Publications)
- The Eve of Persecution
