= Annunciade =

Annunciade ('Annunciation'), and various alternate spellings, is the name of several religious or military orders, including:

== Religious orders ==
- Servites, also known as the Servants or Annunziata, first religious order of its kind was instituted in 1232 by seven Florentine merchants
- Annunciates of Lombardy also called the Ambrosians, the Sisters of Saint Ambrose, or the Sisters of Saint Marcellina, were organized at Pavia in 1408 by young women from Venice and Pavia, under the direction of Father Beccaria, O.S.B., for the care of the sick.
- Order of the Annunciation of the Blessed Virgin Mary is a contemplative order of Franciscan nuns founded at Bourges by Joan of France, after her annulment from Louis XII, with houses throughout France
- Archconfraternity of the Annunciation was a charitable association founded in 1460 in Rome by Cardinal Torrecrematato provide doweries to girls from poor families
- Order of the Most Holy Annunciation, also called Celestian Annunciades, is a community of contemplative nuns founded in 1602 in Genoa by Blessed Maria Vittoria Fornari

== Military orders ==
- Supreme Order of the Most Holy Annunciation was a military order instituted in 1350 by Duke Amadeus VI, Count of Savoy, the first called the Order of the True Lover's Knots in memory of a bracelet of hair presented to the founder by a lady, but upon the election of Amadeus VIII to the pontificate in 1439, it changed its name for that of the Annunciation of angel Gabriel

== See also ==
- Annunciation
