= Order of the Annunciation of the Blessed Virgin Mary =

Intentional community

- Abbreviation: O.Ann.M
- Formation: 1501
- Type: Roman Catholic religious order
- Website: www.annonciade.info

The Order of the Annunciation of the Blessed Virgin Mary (Latin: Ordo de Annuntiatione Beatæ Mariæ Virginis), also known as Sisters of the Annunciation or Annonciades, is an enclosed religious order of contemplative nuns founded in honor of the Annunciation in 1501 at Bourges, France by Joan de Valois, also known as Joan of France, daughter of King Louis XI, and first wife (annulled) of King Louis XII.

== History ==
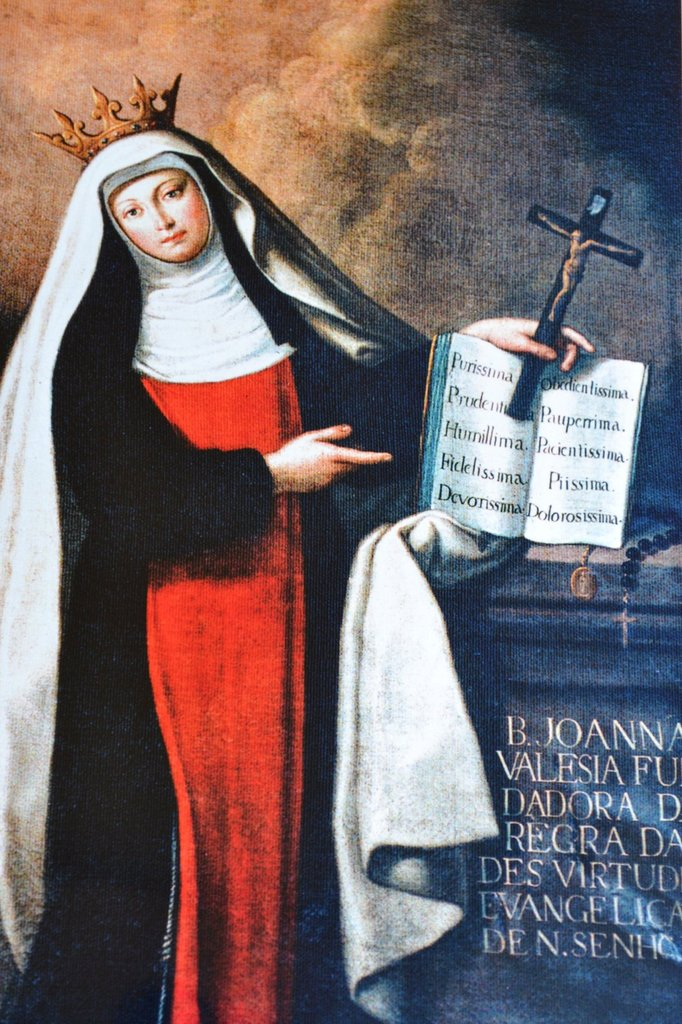
Saint Joan of Valois, foundress of the Order of the Annunciation.

=== Origins ===
After Joan of Valois husband Louis XII gained the throne of France in 1498, he obtained an annulment of their marriage from the Holy See, on the basis of their having been forced into the marriage by Joan's father Louis XI. After being freed from her marriage, Joan retired to Bourges, where in 1501 she succeeded in founding a monastery in honor of the Annunciation of the Angel Gabriel to the Blessed Virgin Mary. The Rule of Life she wrote for her community is entitled The Ten Virtues of the Blessed Virgin, the imitation of which she proposed as the aim of the order. It was confirmed by Pope Alexander VI and, on 8 October 1502, the first five members received the veil, the foundress herself taking solemn vows on 4 June 1503. She died in 1505.

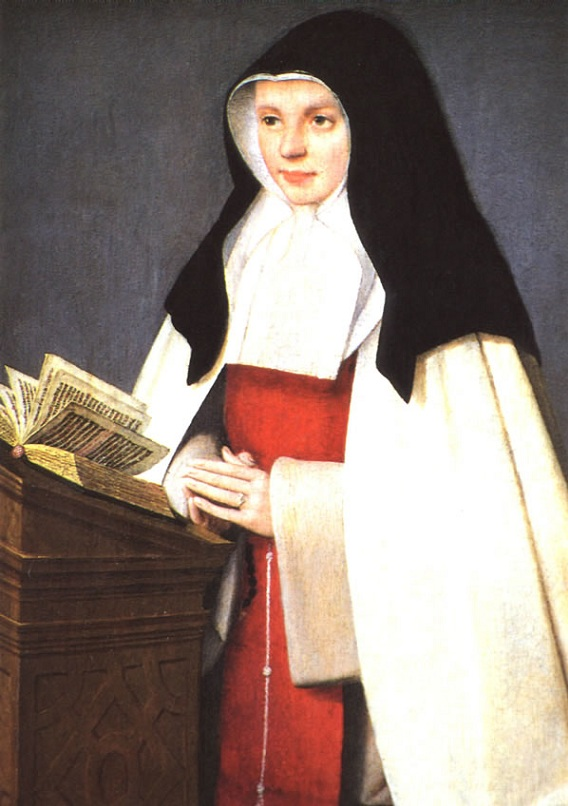
Joan of Valois dressed with her Annonciade religious habit.

=== Expansion ===
The Franciscan friar who had assisted Joan in the foundation, Gilbert Nicolas, (whose name was changed by brief of Pope Alexander to Gabriel Maria) was appointed Superior of the monastery by her, and, after revising the Constitutions of the Order, presented them for confirmation in 1517 to Pope Leo X, who then placed the Order under the jurisdiction of the Friars Minor. Under Nicholas' guidance, new monasteries of the Order were founded in Albi (1507), Béthune (1516), Bruges (1517), Rodez (1519), Bordeaux (1520), Chanteloup (1529), and Louvain (1530). The rapid expansion of the Order was due primarily to the patronage of the Archduchess Margaret of Austria, who had been betrothed in her infancy to the future King Charles VIII of France and brought up at the French royal court. When she became Governor of the Netherlands, she showed great interest in the Franciscan Order and the Order founded by Joan, whom she had known personally.

Beginning in 1610, the Ministers Provincial of the Franciscan friars in France conducted a reform of female communities of the Franciscan Third Order Regular, which established for them enclosed monasteries and allowed the taking of solemn vows, which previously had been barred to them due to the more apostolic way of life they had followed. In this way a number of communities of Franciscan Sisters were added to the Annonciade nuns.

=== Persecution ===
The Thirty Years' War proved to be a difficult period for the monasteries of the Order, with many of them damaged, burned, and abandoned. The history of one house of the Order serves to illustrate the turmoil they faced. In May 1635, Catherine Bar, and the nuns of the monastery in Bruyères were forced to flee before the Swedish army. After briefly settling in Badonviller, they were instructed by the Minister Provincial to move to Commercy, where they opened a small school for girls. Some nuns, exhausted by hardships, fell ill along the way with the plague. Only six nuns of the original community of twenty survived. The survivors found shelter with a community of Benedictine nuns in Rambervillers and joined them in 1639. Bar then took the new religious name of Mechtilde of the Blessed Sacrament. She later went on to found the Benedictine Sisters of Perpetual Adoration in her hometown of Saint-Dié-des-Vosges in 1660.

Three of the nuns from that original monastery, however, found their way to the hospitality of a friend of their former monastery living in Burey-en-Vaux. With her help, in 1647 they re-established their community in Vaucouleurs.

Prior to the French Revolution, there were 45 Annonciade monasteries, mostly in France and Belgium. The French houses were suppressed during the turmoil. According to tradition, three nuns from the Villeneuve-sur-Lot monastery were executed during the Reign of Terror for their faith.

Fleeing restrictions on and persecution of religious orders during the Third Republic, a monastery existed at Saint Margaret's Bay (Kent, England) from 1903 until 1976. A photograph of the facility appears on St Margaret's Village Archive website.

== Monastery life ==
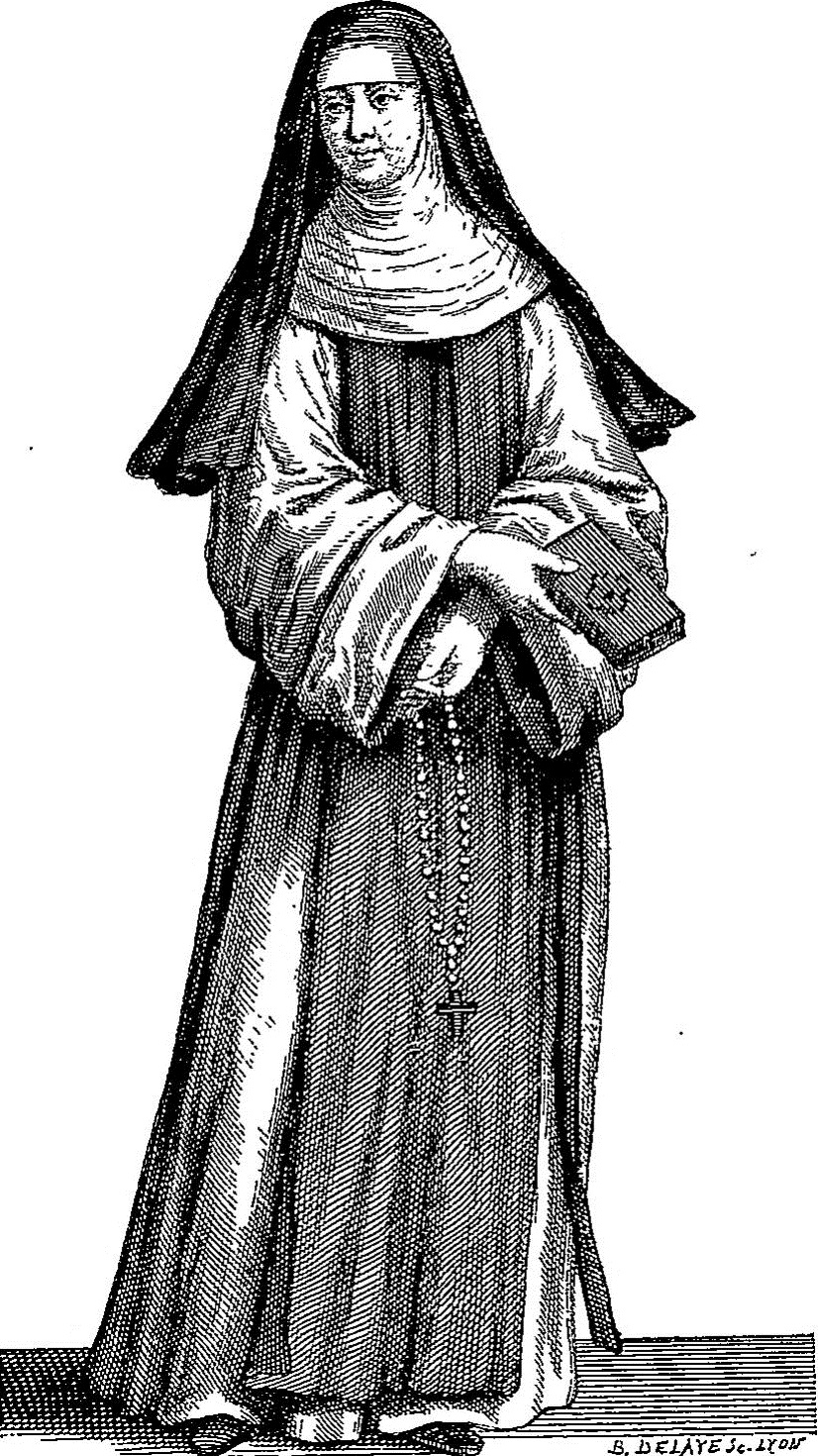
Annonciade nun religious habit.

Their present-day mission as nuns is first and foremost contemplation and giving praise to God. Hours are designated for meditation and silence. Today the Order numbers around eighty nuns living in seven monasteries in France, Belgium and Costa Rica. A new foundation is under way at the Marian Shrine in Licheń, Poland.

== Monasteries ==
The Order currently (2015) has four monasteries in France and one each in Belgium, Costa Rica, and Poland:

- Monastère de l’Annonciade, Villeneuve-sur-Lot, Lot-et-Garonne, France, was re-established in 1863 on the site of an Annonciade monastery established in 1624.
- Monastère de l’Annonciade, 38, rue J.-F. Marmontel, Thiais, Val-de-Marne, France, established in 1926. This convent publishes much of the literature produced by this order and serves as its central archives.
- Monasterium Magnificat, Westmalle, Belgium, established in 1965 by merging Tienen (1629), Geel (1853), and Merksem (1898), the three small monasteries existing in Flanders.
- Monastère de l’Annonciade, Brucourt, Calvados, France, established in 1975 by six nuns from Thiais. On October 8, 2014, the cornerstone for a new monastery was laid at Caen-Grentheville, Calvados, France.
- Monastère de l’Annonciade, Peyruis, Alpes-de-Haute-Provence, France, established in 1980 and transferred in April 2007 to Alajuela, Costa Rica, now known by the Spanish name Monasterio de la Anunciada.
- Monastère de l'Annonciade, Saint-Doulchard, near Bourges, Cher, France, established on 16 June 1988 by eight sisters from Thiais.
- Monastery of Menton, Alpes-Maritimes, France, was established in 2000 but closed in 2012.
- Grablin Forest, Poland. While their monastery was being built, the sisters resided at the Licheń Shrine established in 2009, although the Order had had a presence in Poland since the 1970s.

== Confraternity of the Annunciation ==
In 1517 Gabriel Nicholas obtained Church approval for the merger of two previously existing religious fraternities into a confraternity called the Way of Peace (Chemin de Paix) known today as the Confraternity of the Annunciade, the Way of Peace. The Order of Peace may be joined through affiliation to one of the monasteries of the Order.

== See also ==
- Annunciade
- Christian monasticism
- Enclosed religious orders
- Order of the Most Holy Annunciation
