= Gilbert Nicolas =

French priest (c. 1462–1532)

Blessed Gilbert Nicolas OFM
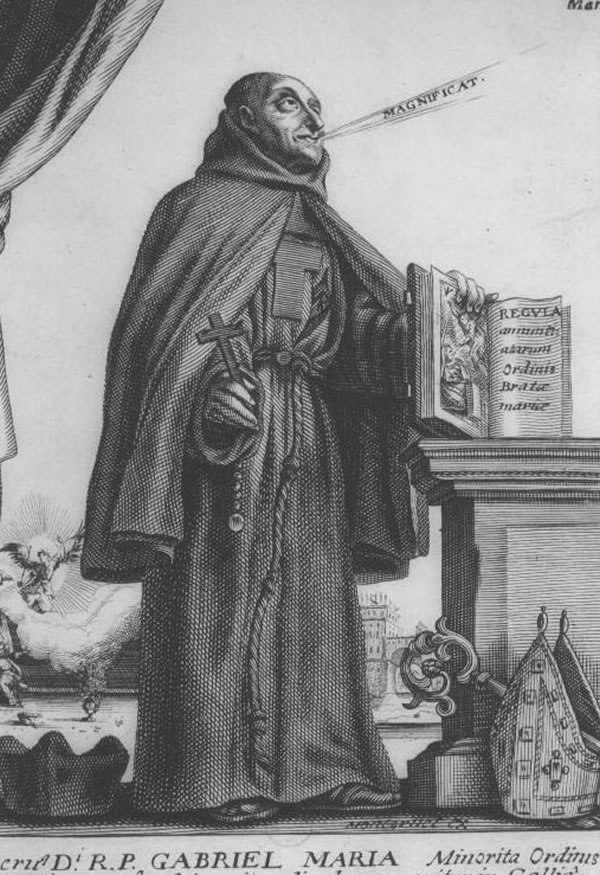
- Born: c. 1462; Besse, Puy-de-Dôme, Kingdom of France
- Died: 27 August 1532 (aged 70); Rodez, Aveyron, Kingdom of France
- Beatified: 21 February 2026, Apostolic Palace, Vatican City by Pope Leo XIV
- Feast: August 27

Gilbert Nicolas (c. 1462 – 27 August 1532), religious name Gabriel-Maria, was a French Roman Catholic priest and a professed member of the Order of Friars Minor. He co-founded – alongside Saint Jeanne de Valois – the Order of the Annunciation of the Blessed Virgin Mary in 1501. Nicolas met with both Pope Alexander VI and Pope Leo X in relation to the congregation's foundation and rule and was noted for his humble and meek outlook amongst his peers while also being known for his intelligence and diligence in the affairs of the congregation he helped establish.

The beatification process commenced in France. He was declared a Blessed by Pope Leo XIV on February 21, 2026.

== Life ==
Gilbert Nicolas was born in 1462 in the Kingdom of France. In 1478 a sermon that a Franciscan preacher gave on the topic of the Immaculate Conception moved Gilbert to consider the prospects of becoming a priest. He joined the Order of Friars Minor in 1475 and entered the convent of Notre-Dame de Lafond to join.

Nicolas studied at the convent of Amboise where he was ordained a priest. From 1498 until 1502 he served as the gatekeeper of his convent where he later met Saint Jeanne de Valois and he became her confessor and spiritual director. The former Queen consort was annulled from King Louis XII and went with Nicolas to Bourges to found a religious order.

He travelled to Rome where he met with Pope Alexander VI to receive papal approval for the new congregation – though the College of Cardinals voiced their disapproval. But the Cardinal Bishop of Modena Giovanni Battista Ferrari had a dream of God who rebuked the college for their refusal of the order and saw Saint Lawrence the Deacon and Saint Francis of Assisi extend their arms over Nicolas in blessing. The cardinal summoned Nicolas to tell him of this and Alexander VI later ratified the rule and establishment of the new order on 12 February 1502. At the same time the pope issued a papal brief that allowed for Nicolas to assume the religious name of "Gabriel-Maria". He composed the rule of the order and travelled to Rome and presented it to Pope Leo X on 11 June 1517; the pontiff also aggregated the order to the Order of Friars Minor. He never wanted to accept a doctoral degree – though the path remained opened to him – and he kept on rejecting episcopal appointments.

He served as the vicar of the order's Aquitaine branch from 1503 until 1508 when the foundress appointed him as the superior of the convent. Under his guidance new convents were founded in Albi (1507) and Bethune (1516) while other convents were founded across the nation in places such as Bruges (1517) and Bordeaux (1520). Nicolas also provided advice and support for the reform of the Poor Clares and around 1520 visited the congregation's provinces in Ireland and Scotland in addition to the new Anglican England. He also preached for a crusade against the Ottoman Empire and amongst his fellow Franciscans initiated research on the influence and reach of Lutheranism.

Nicolas died on 27 August 1532 and was buried in Rodez.

== Beatification cause ==
The beatification process opened in an informative process that required joint collaboration between the forums of Créteil and Agen in a move that accorded Nicolas the title of Servant of God. All his spiritual writings were collected and approved on 13 December 1916. An apostolic process later opened a decade later on 20 May 1927 as a means of continuing the work of the informative process.

The cause then halted for several decades until 2003 when a decree was issued to resume the process; the transfer of the competent forum from Rodez was issued on 21 July 2009 and the Congregation for the Causes of Saints in 2010 granted the official "nihil obstat" to the continuation of the cause. A diocesan process opened on 28 February 2013 and concluded its work on 2 June 2015. The postulator assigned to this cause is Giovangiuseppe Califano. The promulgation of the decree confirming his heroic virtues and longstanding cultus, under Pope Leo XIV, was made on 21 February 2026.
