= Religious order (Catholic) =

Catholic religious community living under solemn vows

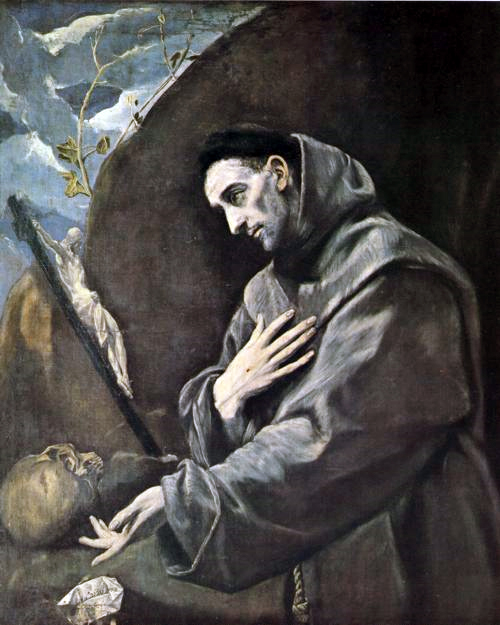
Saint Francis of Assisi, founder of the mendicant Order of Friars Minor, as painted by El Greco

In the Catholic Church, a religious order is a community of consecrated life with members who profess solemn vows. They are classed as a type of religious institute.

Subcategories of religious orders are:

- canons regular (canons and canonesses regular who recite the Divine Office and serve a church and perhaps a parish);
- clerics regular (priests who take religious vows and have an active apostolic life);
- mendicants (friars and religious sisters, possibly living and working in a friary or a convent, who live from alms, recite the Divine Office, and, in the case of the men, participate in apostolic activities); and
- monastics (monks and nuns living and working in a monastery or a nunnery and reciting the Divine Office).

Catholic religious orders began as early as the 500s, with the Order of Saint Benedict being formed in 529. The earliest orders include the Cistercians (1098), the Premonstratensians (1120), the Poor Clares founded by Francis of Assisi (1212), and the Benedictine reform movements of Cluny (1216). These orders were confederations of independent abbeys and priories, who were unified through a loose structure of leadership and oversight.

Later the mendicant orders such as the Carmelites, the Order of Friars Minor, the Order of Preachers, the Order of the Most Holy Trinity and the Order of Saint Augustine formed. These Mendicant orders did not hold property for their religious communities, instead begging for alms and going where they were needed. Their leadership structure included each member, as opposed to each abbey or house, as subject to their direct superior.

In the past, what distinguished religious orders from other institutes was the classification of the vows that the members took as solemn vows. According to this criterion, the last religious order founded was that of the Bethlehemite Brothers in 1673. Nevertheless, in the course of the 20th century, some religious institutes outside the category of orders obtained permission to make solemn vows, at least of poverty, thus blurring the distinction.

== Essential distinguishing mark ==
Solemn vows were originally considered indissoluble. As noted below, dispensations began to be granted in later times, but originally not even the Pope could dispense from them. If for a just cause a member of a religious order was expelled, the vow of chastity remained unchanged and so rendered invalid any attempt at marriage, the vow of obedience obliged in relation, generally, to the bishop rather than to the religious superior, and the vow of poverty was modified to meet the new situation but the expelled religious "could not, for example, will any goods to another; and goods which came to him reverted at his death to his institute or to the Holy See."

=== Weakening of the distinction in 1917 ===
The former 1917 Code of Canon Law reserved the term religious order for institutes in which the vows were solemn, and used the term religious congregation (or simply congregation) for institutes with simple vows. The members of a religious order for men were called regulars, those belonging to a religious congregation were simply religious, a term that applied also to regulars. For women, those with simple vows were called religious sisters, with the term nun reserved in canon law for those who belonged to an institute of solemn vows, even if in some localities they were allowed to take simple vows instead.

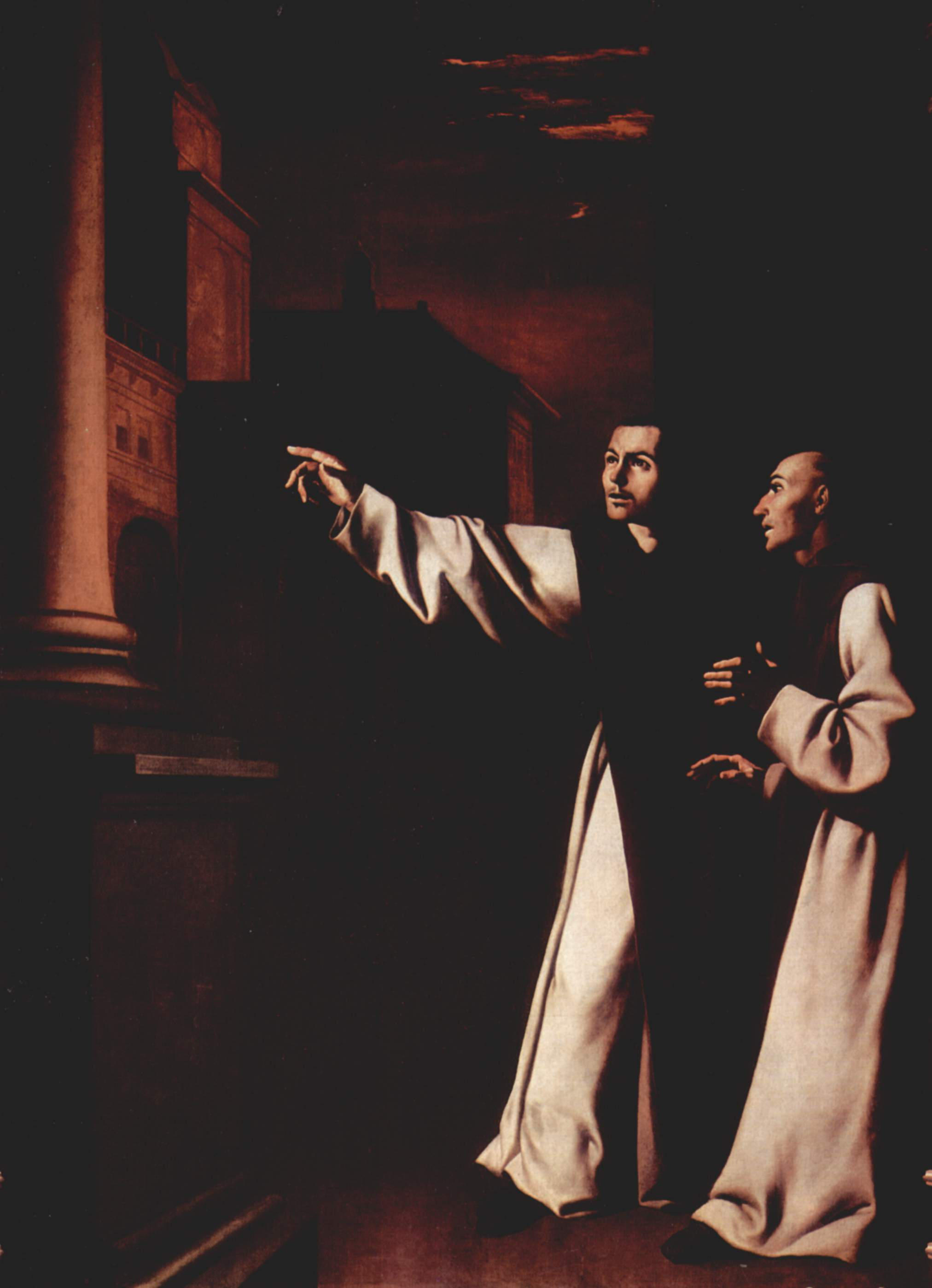
The Hieronymite monks

However, it abolished the distinction according to which solemn vows, unlike simple vows, were indissoluble. It recognized no totally indispensable religious vows and thereby abrogated for the Latin Church the special consecration that distinguished orders from congregations, while keeping some juridical distinctions.

In practice, even before 1917 dispensations from solemn religious vows were being obtained by grant of the Pope himself, while departments of the Holy See and superiors specially delegated by it could dispense from simple religious vows.

The 1917 Code maintained a juridical distinction by declaring invalid any marriage attempted by solemnly professed religious or by those with simple vows to which the Holy See had attached the effect of invalidating marriage, while stating that no simple vow rendered a marriage invalid, except in the cases in which the Holy See directed otherwise. Thus members of orders were barred absolutely from marriage, and any marriage they attempted was invalid. Those who made simple vows were obliged not to marry, but if they did break their vow, the marriage was considered valid.

Another difference was that a professed religious of solemn vows lost the right to own property and the capacity to acquire temporal goods for themselves, but a professed religious of simple vows, while being prohibited by the vow of poverty from using and administering property, kept ownership and the right to acquire more, unless the constitutions of the religious institute explicitly stated the contrary.

After publication of the 1917 Code, many institutes with simple vows appealed to the Holy See for permission to make solemn vows. The Apostolic Constitution Sponsa Christi of 21 November 1950 made access to that permission easier for nuns (in the strict sense), though not for religious institutes dedicated to apostolic activity. Many of these latter institutes of women then petitioned for the solemn vow of poverty alone.

Towards the end of the Second Vatican Council, superiors general of clerical institutes and abbots president of monastic congregations were authorized to permit, for a just cause, their subjects of simple vows who made a reasonable request to renounce their property except for what would be required for their sustenance if they were to depart. These changes resulted in a further blurring of the previously clear distinction between orders and congregations, since institutes that were founded as congregations began to have some members who had all three solemn vows or had members that took a solemn vow of poverty and simple vows of chastity and obedience.

=== Further changes in 1983 ===
The current 1983 Code of Canon Law maintains the distinction between solemn and simple vows, but no longer makes any distinction between their juridical effects, including the distinction between orders and congregations. Instead, it uses the single term religious institute to designate all such institutes.

While solemn vows once meant those taken in what was called a religious order, "today, in order to know when a vow is solemn it will be necessary to refer to the proper law of the institutes of consecrated life."

The Annuario Pontificio continues to distinguish between Ordini (Orders) and Congregazioni Religiose Clericali (Clerical Religious Congregations). Some other authors use the terms religious order and religious institute as synonyms; canon lawyer Nicholas Cafardi, commenting on the fact that the canonical term is religious institute, write that religious order is a colloquialism.

== Authority structure ==
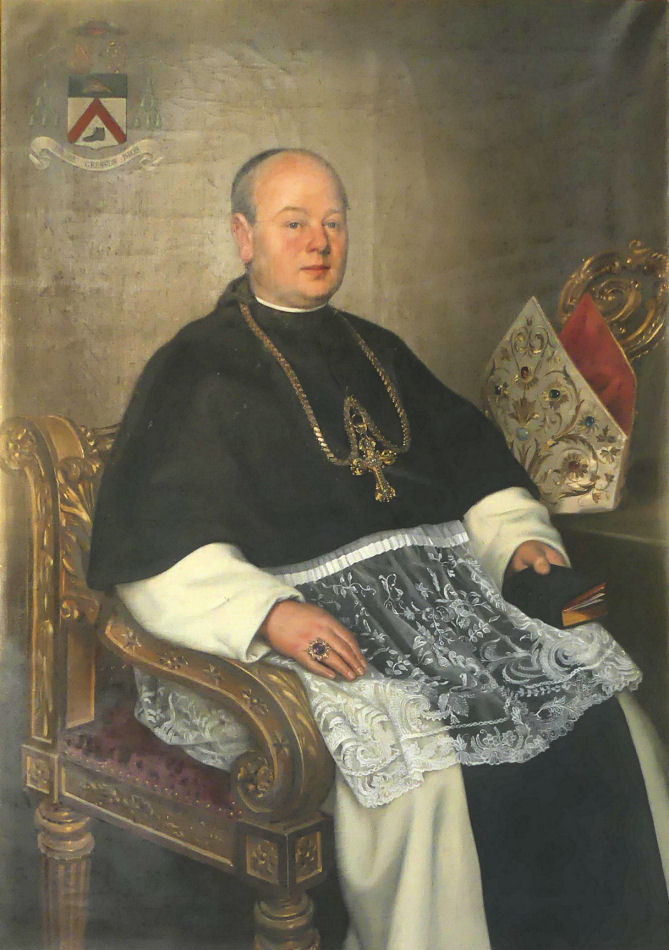
Abbot Thomas Schoen, OCist

A religious order is characterized by an authority structure where a superior general has jurisdiction over the order's dependent communities. An exception is the Order of Saint Benedict which is not a religious order in this technical sense, because it has a system of independent houses, meaning that each abbey is autonomous. However, the constitutions governing the order's global independent houses and its distinct Benedictine congregations (of which there are twenty) were approved by the pope. Likewise, according to rank and authority, the abbot primate's "position with regard to the other abbots [throughout the world] is to be understood rather from the analogy of a primate in a hierarchy than from that of the general of an order like the Dominicans and the Jesuits."

The Canons Regular of Saint Augustine are in a situation similar to that of the Benedictines. They are organized in eight congregations, each headed by an abbot general, but also have an Abbot Primate of the Confederated Canons Regular of Saint Augustine. And the Cistercians are in thirteen congregations, each headed by an abbot general or an abbot president, but do not use the title of abbot primate.

== List of religious orders of men in the Annuario Pontificio ==
Religious orders in the Annuario Pontificio

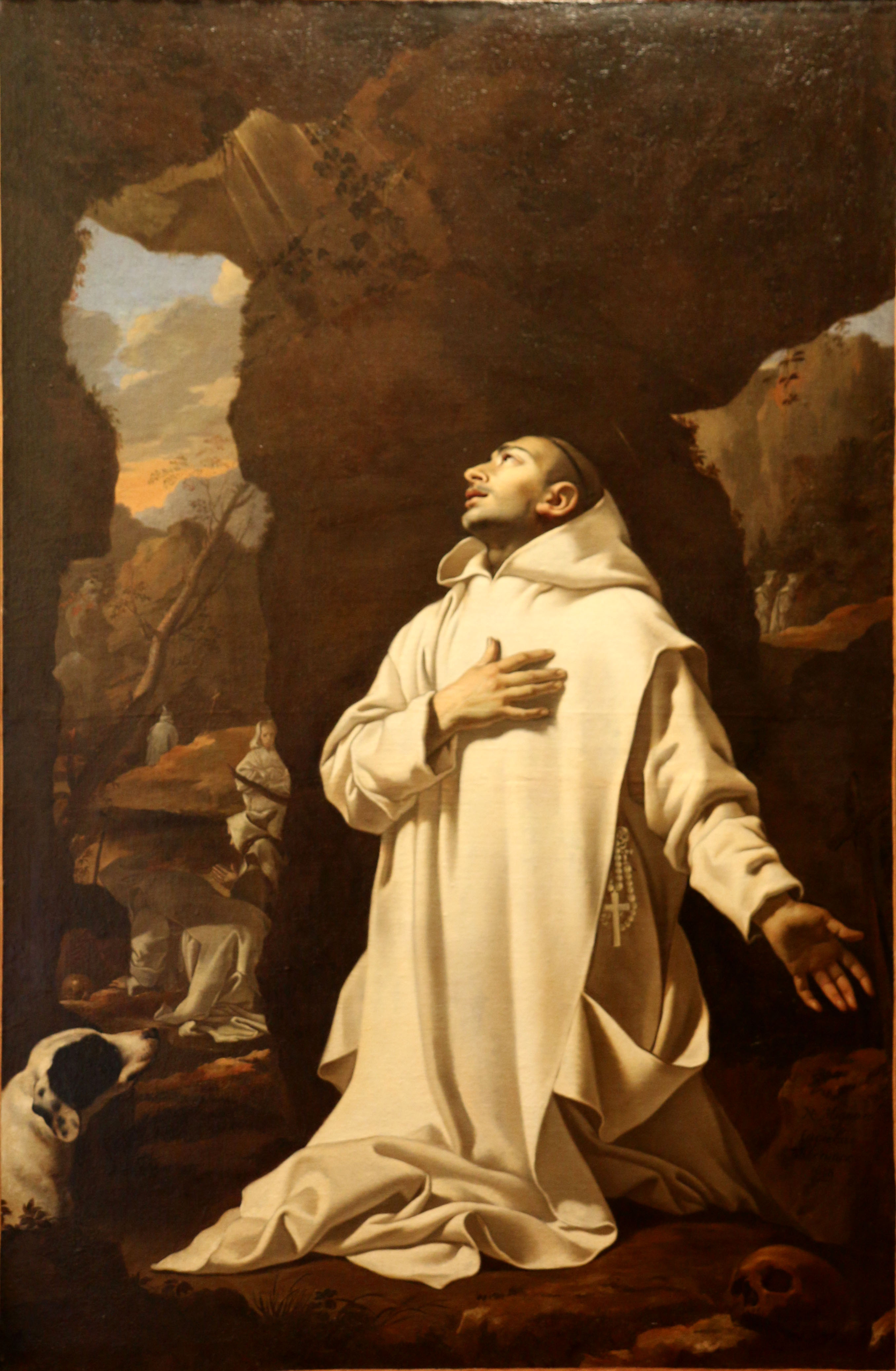
Saint Bruno of Cologne, founder of the Order of Carthusians, as painted by Nicolas Mignard

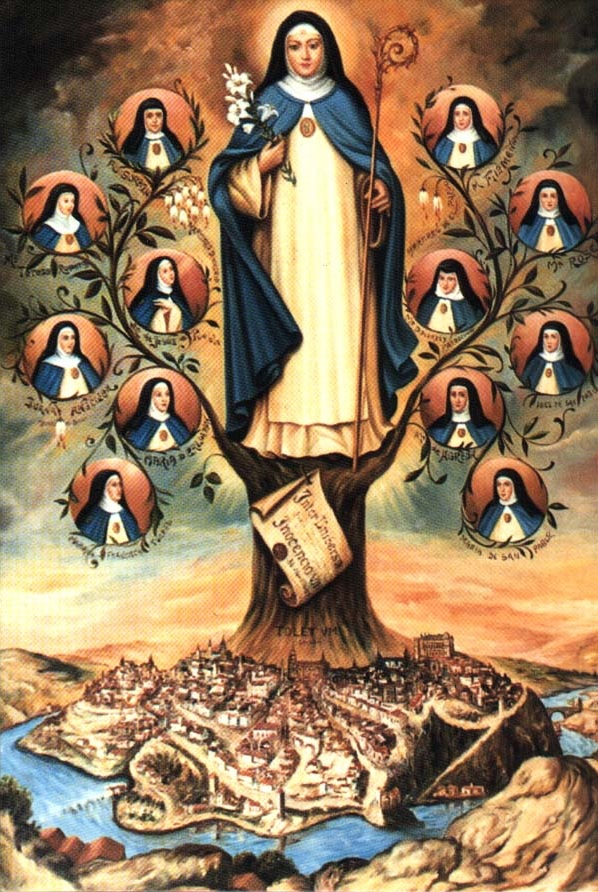
A genealogical tree of the Order of the Immaculate Conception with the foundress, Saint Beatrice of Silva, and other remarkable Conceptionist nuns

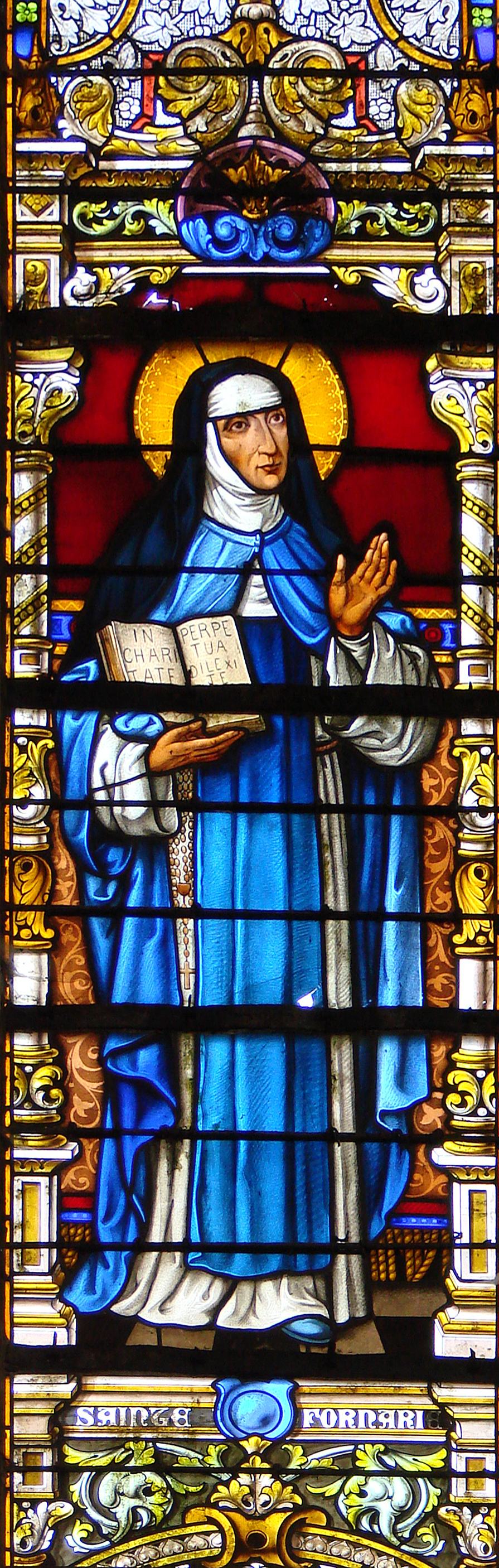
Maria Vittoria De Fornari Strata was the foundress of the Order of the Most Holy Annunciation.

The Annuario Pontificio presents the list of male religious institutes in an Elenco Storio-Giuridico di Precedenza ("Historical-juridical list of precedence"). This list gives priority to certain types of institutes: Orders (divided into Canons Regular, monastics, mendicant orders, clerics regular), clerical religious congregations, lay religious congregations, Eastern religious congregations, secular institutes, societies of apostolic life.

The list is found in the 1964 edition of the Annuario Pontificio, pp. 807–870, where the heading is "States of Perfection (of pontifical right for men)". In the 1969 edition the heading is "Religious and Secular institutes of Pontifical Right for Men", a form it kept until 1975. Since 1976, when work was already advanced on revising the Code of Canon Law, the list has been qualified as "historical-juridical".

Historical-Juridical List of Precedence
Monastic orders
Name	Abbreviation	Founded	Members	Priest members
Order of Saint Benedict	OSB	6th century	6,667	3,297
Camaldolese Hermits of Mount Corona (Camaldolese)	ECMC	1025	66	38
Order of Cistercians	OCist	1098	1,600	657
Order of Cistercians of the Strict Observance (Trappists)	OCSO	1098	1,608	590
Carthusians	OCart	1084	275	142
Order of Saint Paul the First Hermit (Pauline Fathers)	OSPPE	1215	493	366
Hieronymites	OSH	14th century	6	4
Canons regular
Name	Abbreviation	Founded	Members	Priest members
Augustinian Canons (Canons Regular)	CRSA	4th century	561	470
Norbertines (Premonstratensians)	OPraem	1120	1,127	853
Canons Regular of the Holy Cross of Coimbra	ORC	1131	141	83
Teutonic Order	OT	1190	79	62
Canons Regular of the Order of the Holy Cross (Crosier Fathers and Brothers)	OSC	1211	347	227
Knights of the Cross with the Red Star	OCr	1237	18	18
Canons Regular of the Mother of God	CRMD	1969	37	21
Mendicant orders
Name	Abbreviation	Founded	Members	Priest members
Order of Preachers (Dominicans)	OP	13th century	5,545	4,147
Order of Friars Minor	OFM	1209	12,476	8,512
Order of Friars Minor Conventual	OFMConv	1209	3,981	2,777
Order of Friars Minor Capuchin	OFMCap	1525	10,355	6,796
Third Order Regular of St. Francis of Penance	TOR	1221	813	581
Order of Saint Augustine	OSA	4th century	2,500	1,826
Order of Augustinian Recollects	OAR	1588	955	815
Order of Discalced Augustinians	OAD	1592	227	144
Order of the Brothers of the Blessed Virgin Mary of Mount Carmel (Carmelites)	OCarm		2,041	1,303
Order of the Discalced Brothers of the Blessed Virgin Mary of Mount Carmel (Discalced Carmelites)	OCD	1562	3,978	2,897
Order of the Most Holy Trinity and of the Captives (Trinitarians)	OSsT	1198	612	426
Order of the Blessed Virgin Mary of Mercy (Mercedarians)	OdeM	1218	649	483
Discalced Mercedarians	OMD	1603	34	29
Order of Servants of Mary (Servite Order)	OSM	1233	786	522
Order of Minims	OM	1435	161	118
Brothers Hospitallers of Saint John of God	OH	1537	995	115
Bethlehemite Brothers	OFB	1653	13	1
Clerics regular
Name	Abbreviation	Founded	Members	Priest members
Theatines (Congregation of Clerics Regular Clerics Regular)	CR	1524	161	124
Barnabites (Clerics Regular of Saint Paul)	B, Obarn, CRSP	1530	335	279
Society of Jesus (Jesuits)	SJ	1540	14,839	10,721
Somaschi Fathers (Order of Clerics Regular of Somasca)	CRS	1534	520	327
Camillians	M.I.	1582	1,125	825
Clerics Regular Minor (Clerics Regular Ministers to the Sick)	CRM	1588	180	106
Clerics Regular of the Mother of God	OMD	1574	115	87
Piarists (Order of Poor Clerics Regular of the Mother of God of the Pious Schools)	SchP	1617	1,356	945

== Religious orders of women in the Annuario Pontificio ==
The list of religious institutes for women in the Annuario Pontificio does not distinguish between orders (with solemn vows) and congregations (with simple vows). Many of the religious orders for men listed above have comparable religious institutes for women with solemn vows.

== See also ==
General

- Christian monasticism
  - Christian Religious Profession
  - Christian Monastic Vows
- Provida Mater Ecclesia
- Catholic order liturgical rite
- Congregation for Institutes of Consecrated Life and Societies of Apostolic Life
- Enclosed religious orders
- Major orders (Holy orders)
- Military orders
- Religious brother#Catholicism
- Religious sister
- Third orders

Lists

- List of Catholic religious institutes
- List of military orders
- List of Societies of apostolic life
