= Joan of France, Duchess of Berry =

Queen of France in 1498

St. Joan of France
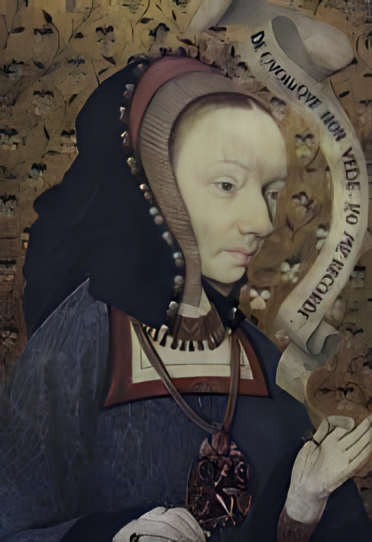

Queen consort of France
- Tenure: 7 April 1498 – 17 December 1498
- Born: 23 April 1464; Nogent-sur-Marne, County of Dreux
- Died: 4 February 1505 (aged 40); Bourges, Duchy of Berry
- Spouse: Louis XII of France (m. 1476; ann. 1498)
- House: Valois
- Father: Louis XI of France
- Mother: Charlotte of Savoy

Joan of France (French: Jeanne de France, Jeanne de Valois; 23 April 1464 – 4 February 1505), sometimes called Joan the Lame (French: Jeanne la boiteuse), was briefly Queen of France as the wife of King Louis XII, in between the death of her brother, King Charles VIII, and the annulment of her marriage. After that, she retired to her domain, where she soon founded the monastic Order of the Annunciation of the Blessed Virgin Mary, where she served as abbess. From this Order later sprang the religious congregation of the Apostolic Sisters of the Annunciation, founded in 1787 to teach the children of the poor. She was canonized on 28 May 1950.

== Biography ==
Joan was born on 23 April 1464 in the castle of Pierre de Brézé, a trusted supporter of her grandfather, King Charles VII of France, at Nogent-le-Roi in the County of Dreux.

She was the second daughter of King Louis XI of France and of his second wife Charlotte of Savoy. Joan's paternal grandparents were Charles VII of France and Marie of Anjou , while her maternal grand-parents were Louis,Duke of Savoy and Anne of Cyprus. While hef mother would give birth to eight children, only three would live to adulthood; Anne, Joan and the future Charles VIII

Shortly after her birth, the king signed an agreement to marry her to his second cousin Louis, the Duke of Orléans, later King Louis XII of France, who was aged two at the time.

Joan is said to have been born sickly and deformed.Joan had a hump on her back and walked with a limp, suggesting that she had an abnormal curvature of the spine.

Joan's earliest years were not spent at her father's court but the Château of Amboise alongside her mother, siblings and maternal aunts Agnes and Bonne. This has sometimes been cited as evidence of her father's coldness but the more stronger reasoning behind this is that Louis wanted to keep his children living in relative seclusion as to avoid them catching an illness from the many visitors to the French court.

In 1469, Joan was sent to live at the Chateau de Lignieres and entrusted into the care of the Baron François de Beaujeu, seigneur de Linières and his wife, Anne de Culan. François was a distant relation to both Joan's parents and a high official (grand queux) at Louis court. The couple, who were childless, lavished affection on their foster daughter. Taking charge of her education, they had her taught both poetry and mathematics, painting, embroidery and how to play the lute.

The couple were also faithful Catholics and instilled in the members of their household a solid grounding in the faith. At a young age, her father asked her to name the confessor she wanted. She gave him the only name she knew, that of Jean de La Fontaine, Guardian of the Franciscan friary in Amboise. The king approved her choice and appointed the friar to this post. Despite the distance between them, he would travel regularly to hear the princess's confession. Joan began to develop a strong pleasure in prayer, and would pass long periods in the castle chapel. The baron supported her in this and had a path paved between the castle and the chapel built for easier walking in poor weather. Under the friar's guidance she was admitted into the Third Order of St. Francis.

In 1471 King Louis XI ordered the catechism of reciting the Hail Mary for peace to be practised throughout the kingdom. Joan had a strong attachment to this particular prayer. She would later write that it was in that same year that she had received a prophecy from the Virgin Mary that some day she would found a religious community in honor of the Virgin Mary.

== Marriage ==
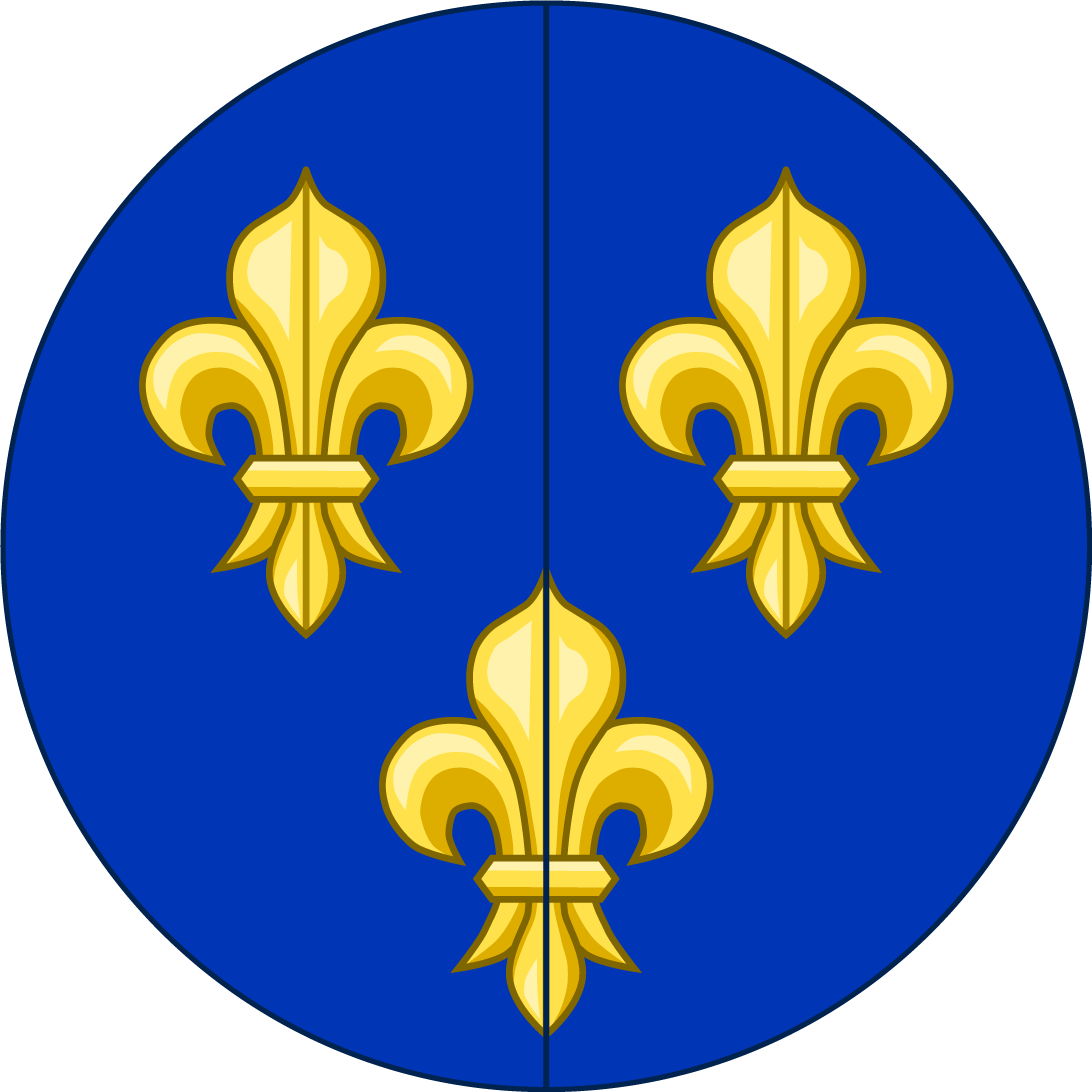
Coat-of-arms for Queen Joan of France

In 1473, King Louis XI signed marriage contracts for his daughters. On 8 September 1476, at the age of 12, Joan was married to the young Louis II, Duke of Orléans in Montrichard. This marriage was arranged because Joan, due to her malformation, was expected to be sterile. By doing so, Louis XI (of France) hoped to extinguish the Orléans cadet branch of the House of Valois. Louis II (of Orléans) was displeased at this forced marriage, and his treatment of his new wife reflected this.

Louis XI died in 1483 and was succeeded by his son, Charles VIII. As he was still a child, his (Charles') sister, Anne de Beaujeu, was made Regent of the kingdom. By 1484, Joan's husband, Louis II of Orléans, had begun a series of military campaigns against the kingdom. These lasted until 1488, when he was taken captive by the royal forces. During this period, he fathered an illegitimate son, Michel de Bussy, who was later appointed the Bishop of Bourges. Joan administered his domains during his imprisonment, especially the Italian cities of Milan and Asti. Joan, imagining virtues in her husband that did not exist, exerted herself to mitigate his sufferings and to get him freed. Louis of Orléans was released in 1491. Within a few years, he would accompany Charles VIII on his military campaign in Italy.

When Louis ascended to the throne in April 1498 after the accidental death of his brother-in-law, he appealed to the pope to have the marriage annulled in order to marry the late king's widow, Anne of Brittany, in the hope of annexing permanently the Duchy of Brittany to the French Crown.

In what has been described as "one of the seamiest lawsuits of the age", Louis did not, as might be expected, argue the marriage to be void due to consanguinity (the general excuse for the dissolution of a marriage at that time - the couple were second cousins once removed). Louis argued that he had been below the legal age of consent (fourteen) to marry and that the marriage had never been consummated due to her physical deformity, and provided a rich variety of detail as to how she was malformed. Joan, unsurprisingly, fought this uncertain charge fiercely, producing witnesses to Louis boasting of having "mounted my wife three or four times during the night." Louis also claimed that his sexual performance had been inhibited by witchcraft; Joan responded by asking how, in that case, he was able to know what it was like to try to make love to her. Joan resisted having a humiliating physical examination done to confirm or deny that she was still a virgin. Even if such an examination would have verified her claim it would have been pointless, as Pope Alexander VI was regardless committed for political reasons to grant the annulment.

The commission of investigation appointed by the pope established that the marriage with Joan was invalid for lack of consent and that it never had been consummated. Accordingly, he ruled against the Queen. The annulment was declared on 15 December 1498. Joan stepped aside, saying that she would pray for her former husband. She was made Duchess of Berry and retired to Bourges, capital of the duchy.

== Religious life and sainthood ==
Saint Joan of Valois O.Ann.M
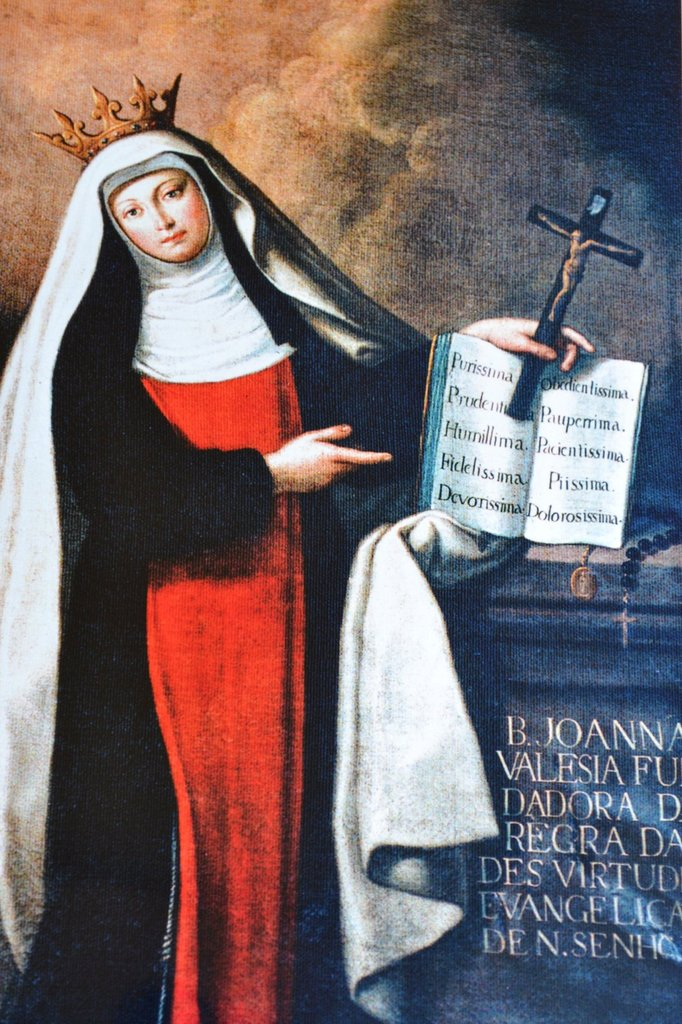
- Resting place: Annunciation Monastery of Bourges
- Honored in: Catholicism
- Beatified: 21 April 1742 by Pope Benedict XIV
- Canonized: 28 May 1950 by Pope Pius XII
- Feast: 4 February
- Major works: Foundress of the Order of the Annunciation of the Blessed Virgin Mary

Once settled in her new domain, Joan confided to her spiritual director, Gabriel Mary, (Note: Gabriel Mary (c. 1460 – 27 August 1532) was born Gilbert Nicholas in Riom, Auvergne. The cause for his formal beatification by the Holy See was officially opened in February 2013.) her call to monastic life. He supported her in this venture, and she began to make plans for the Order of the Annunciation of the Blessed Virgin Mary, a new enclosed religious order in honour of the Annunciation (the announcement to Virgin Mary by an angel that she would become the mother of Jesus, although she was a virgin). It was established as an independent branch of the Poor Clares. By May 1500 she had received 11 postulants, the nucleus of the new Order. The Rule of Life she had written for the Order was approved on 12 February 1502 by Pope Alexander. Construction of the first monastery was begun the following year. On Pentecost Sunday 1504, Joan and Friar Gabriel Mary made private commitments to follow the Rule, and thereby established themselves as co-founders of the Order. On 21 November of that same year, the Feast of the Presentation of Mary, Joan and the other women publicly and legally committed themselves to the Order.

Joan died on 4 February 1505 and was buried in the chapel of the Annonciade monastery. Her grave was desecrated during the French Wars of Religion and her body, which was found to be incorrupt, was burned by the Huguenots during their sack of Bourges on 27 May 1562. Soon after her death, miracles and healings attributed to her were said to have occurred. The cause for her canonization was begun in 1631 and Pope Benedict XIV beatified her on 21 April 1742. She was canonized on 28 May 1950 by Pope Pius XII.

== Legacy ==
The religious sisters of the Order of the Annunciation of the Blessed Virgin Mary still maintain their way of life in monasteries in France, Belgium, Costa Rica and Poland. The sisters serve in Belgium, Burundi, Cameroon, the Democratic Republic of the Congo, France and Guatemala.

== Ancestry ==
Ancestors of Joan of France, Duchess of Berry

8. Charles VI of France
4. Charles VII of France
9. Isabeau of Bavaria
2. Louis XI of France
10. Louis II of Naples
5. Marie of Anjou
11. Yolande of Aragon
1. Joan of France
12. Antipope Felix V
6. Louis, Duke of Savoy
13. Mary of Burgundy
3. Charlotte of Savoy
14. Janus of Cyprus
7. Anne of Cyprus
15. Charlotte de Bourbon-La Marche

== Sources ==
- Hale, J. R. (1972). Renaissance Europe: Individual and Society, 1480–1520. New York: Harper & Row. ISBN 0-06-012904-2.

Joan of France, Duchess of Berry House of Valois Cadet branch of the Capetian dynasty Born: 23 April 1464 Died: 4 February 1505
French royalty
Preceded by Anne of Brittany	Queen consort of France; 7 April 1498 – 15 December 1498	Vacant Title next held by Anne of Brittany
French nobility
Vacant Title last held by Charles of Valois	Duchess of Berry; 1498–1505	Vacant Title next held by Marguerite de Navarre
