= Annunciation =

Announcement of the conception and birth of Jesus to Mary

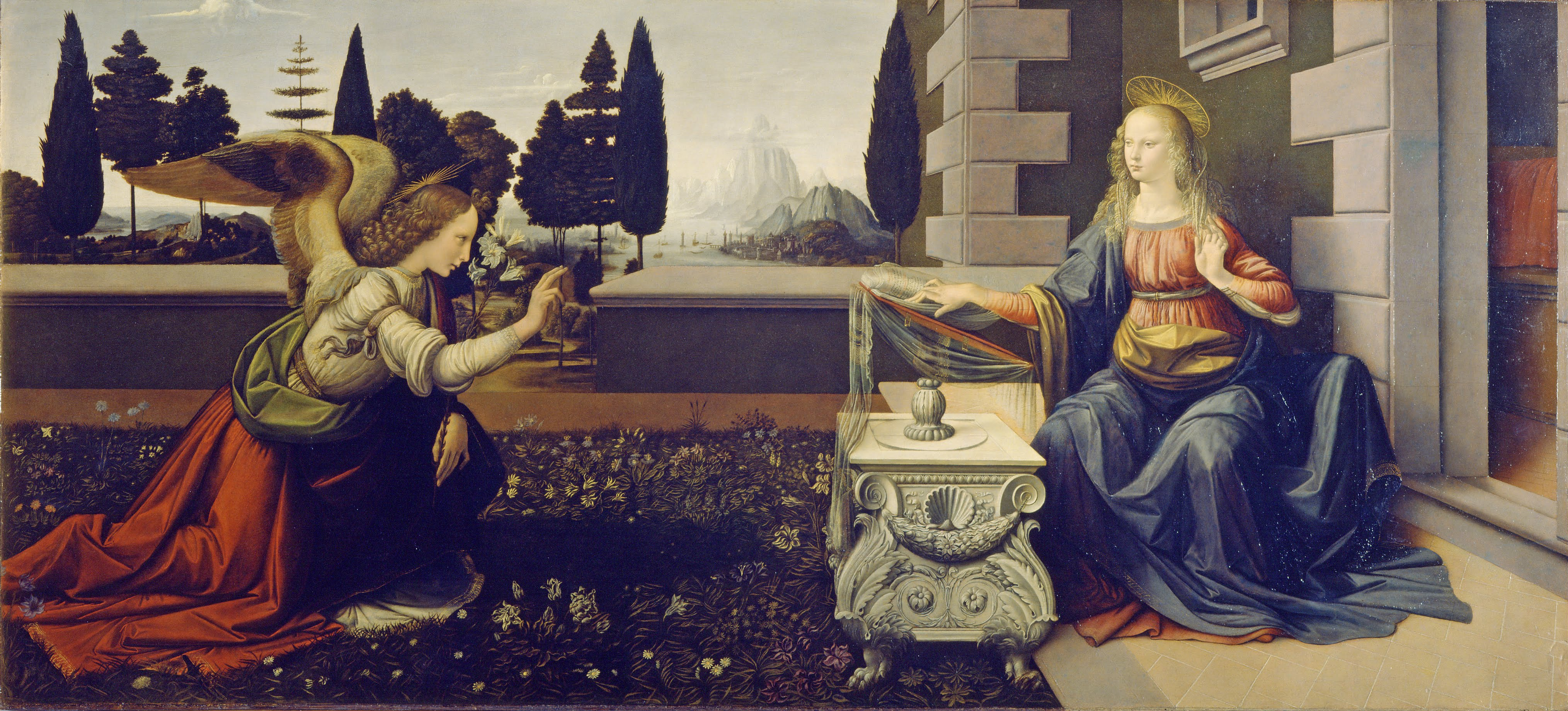
Annunciation (c. 1472–1475), Uffizi, is thought to be Leonardo da Vinci's earliest complete work.

The Annunciation (/əˌnʌnsiˈeɪʃən/; from Latin annuntiatio; also referred to as the Annunciation to the Blessed Virgin Mary, the Annunciation of Our Lady, or the Annunciation of the Lord; Ancient Greek: Ο Ευαγγελισμός της Θεοτόκου) is, according to the Gospel of Luke, the announcement made by the archangel Gabriel to Mary that she would conceive and bear a son through a virgin birth and become the mother of Jesus Christ, the Messiah and Son of God, marking the Incarnation.

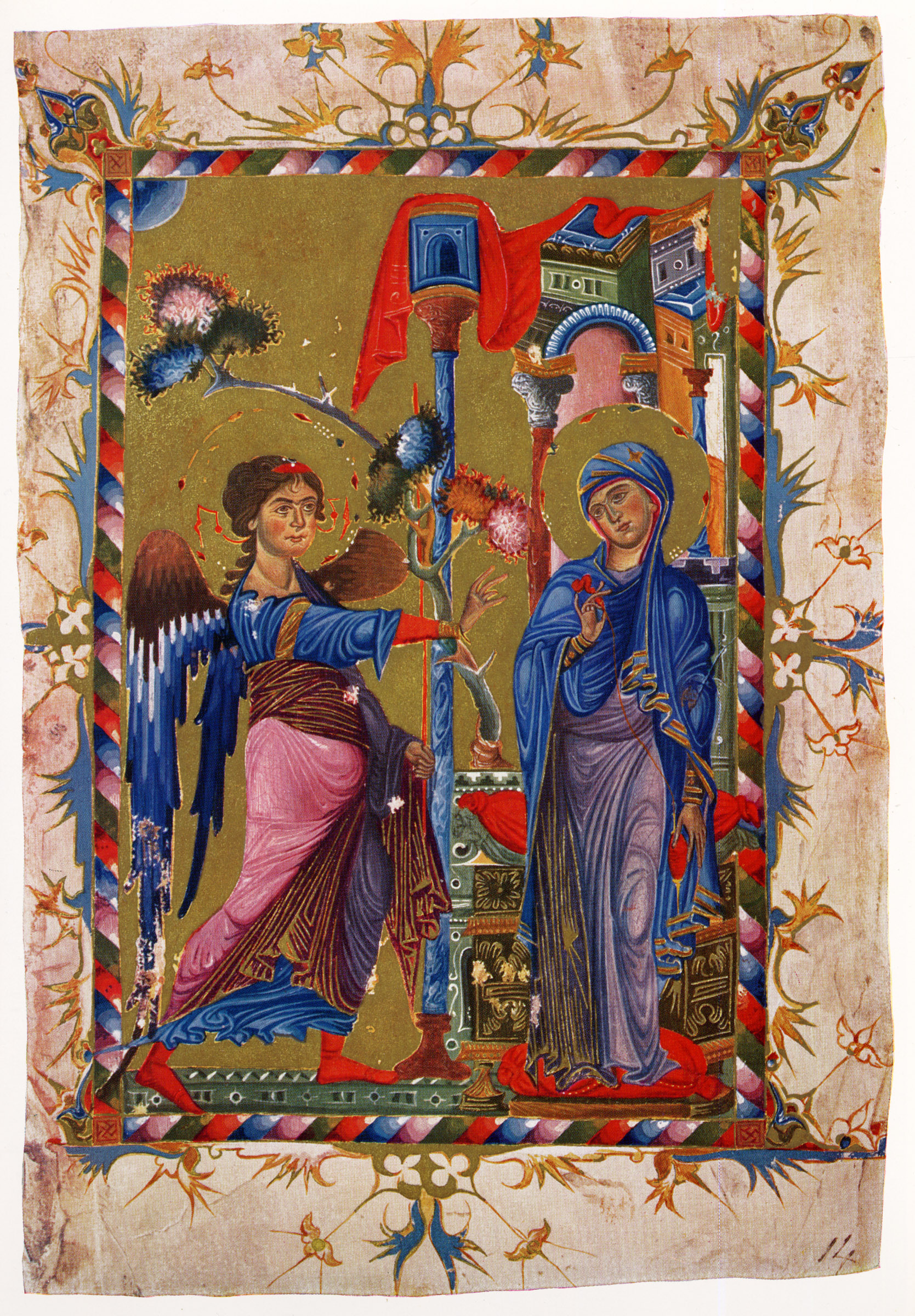
Annunciation by Armenian manuscript illuminator Toros Roslin, 13th century

According to Luke 1:26 the Annunciation occurred in the sixth month of Elizabeth's pregnancy with John the Baptist. Many Christians observe this event with the Feast of the Annunciation on 25 March, an approximation of the northern vernal equinox nine full months before Christmas, the traditional birthday of Jesus.

The Annunciation is a key topic in Christian art in general, as well as in Marian art in the Catholic Church, having been especially prominent during the Middle Ages and Renaissance. A work of art depicting the Annunciation is sometimes itself called an Annunciation.

== Religious sources ==
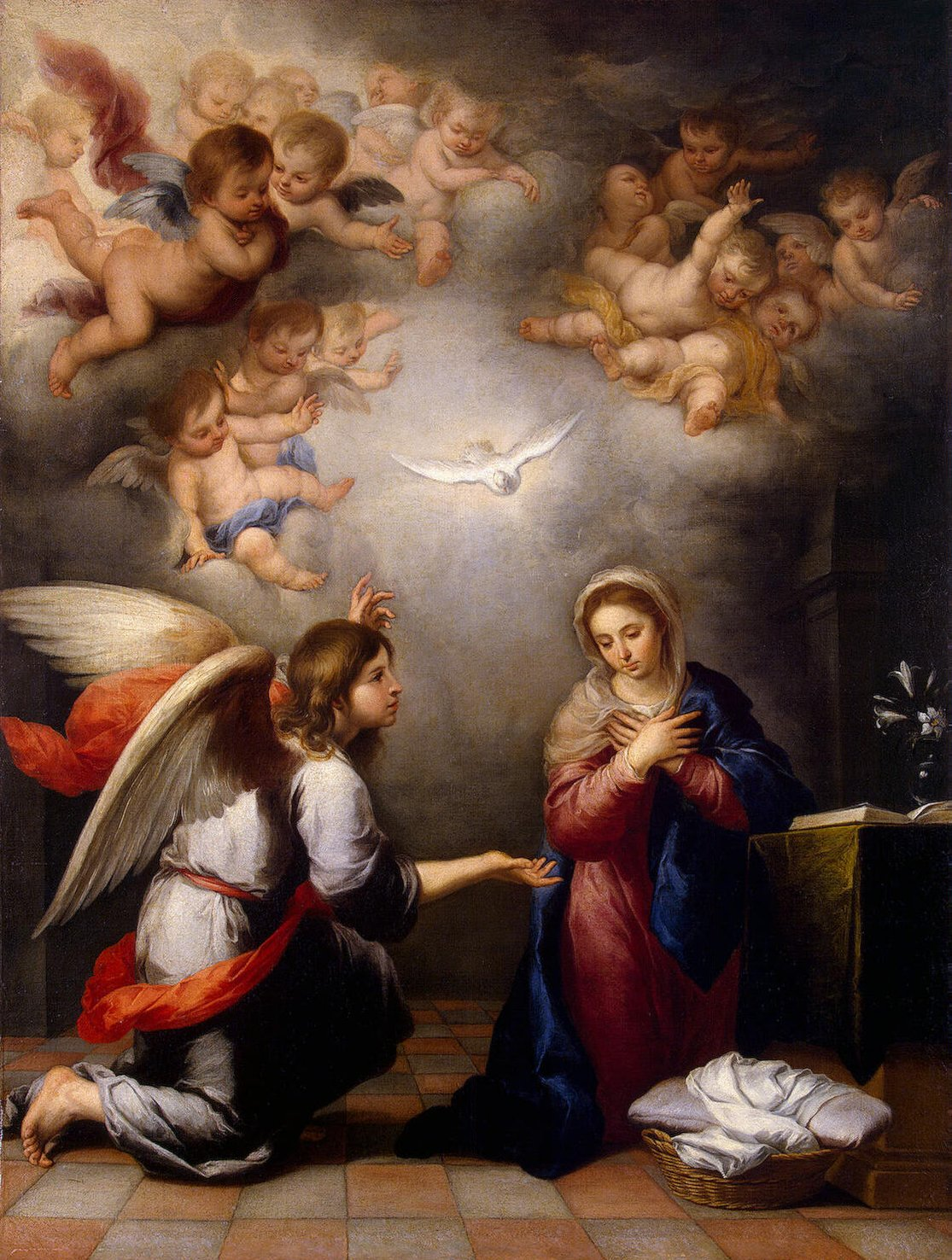
The Annunciation by Murillo, 1655–1660, Hermitage Museum, Saint Petersburg

=== Gospel of Luke ===
The Gospel of Luke recounts the Annunciation to the Blessed Virgin Mary:

And in the sixth month the angel Gabriel was sent from God unto a city of Galilee, named Nazareth, to a virgin espoused to a man whose name was Joseph, of the house of David; and the virgin's name was Mary. And the angel came in unto her, and said, Hail, thou that art highly favoured, the Lord is with thee: blessed art thou among women. And when she saw him, she was troubled at his saying, and cast in her mind what manner of salutation this should be.

And the angel said unto her, Fear not, Mary: for thou hast found favour with God. And, behold, thou shalt conceive in thy womb, and bring forth a son, and shalt call his name Jesus. He shall be great, and shall be called the Son of the Highest: and the Lord God shall give unto him the throne of his father David: and he shall reign over the house of Jacob for ever; and of his kingdom there shall be no end.

Then said Mary unto the angel, How shall this be, seeing I know not a man? And the angel answered and said unto her, The Holy Ghost shall come upon thee, and the power of the Highest shall overshadow thee: therefore also that holy thing which shall be born of thee shall be called the Son of God. And, behold, thy cousin Elisabeth, she hath also conceived a son in her old age: and this is the sixth month with her, who was called barren. For with God nothing shall be impossible. And Mary said, Behold the handmaid of the Lord; be it unto me according to thy word. And the angel departed from her.

— Luke 1:26–38, KJV

Various Bible translations also give Gabriel's salutation as a variation on: "Hail, full of grace" (Luke 1:28, DRV). In this variation, commonly used by Roman Catholics, the archangel Gabriel's greeting to Mary forms the first part of the prayer Hail Mary. Mary's response to the archangel also forms the second versicle and response of the Angelus prayer. The English word fiat, or permission, comes from the Latin let it be done of Mary's acceptance to the angel.

=== Gospel of Matthew ===
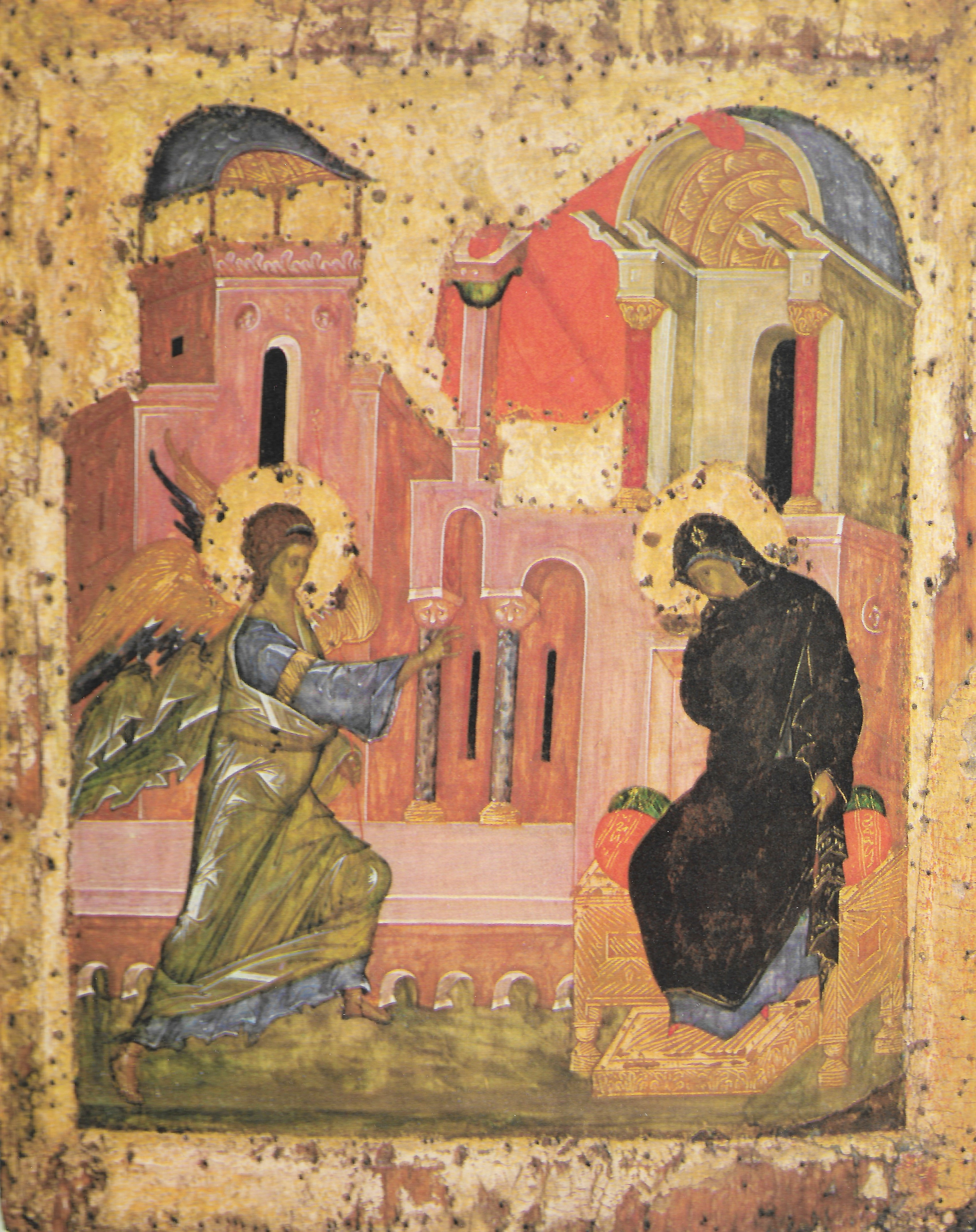
The Annunciation, Russian icon, 14th century

A separate, briefer and different annunciation by an unnamed angel is that given to Joseph in the Gospel of Matthew:

But while he thought on these things, behold, the angel of the Lord appeared unto him in a dream, saying, Joseph, thou son of David, fear not to take unto thee Mary thy wife: for that which is conceived in her is of the Holy Ghost. And she shall bring forth a son, and thou shalt call his name Jesus: for he shall save his people from their sins.

— Matthew 1:20–21, KJV

=== Apocryphal Gospel of James ===
There is a different version contained in the apocryphal Gospel of James, which includes a first appearance of the archangel at the well. (Note: For full text of the apocryphal Gospel of James, see for instance here under "Chapter 11: The Annunciation".)

=== Manuscript 4Q246 ===
Manuscript 4Q246 of the Dead Sea Scrolls reads:

[X] shall be great upon the earth. O king, all people shall make peace, and all shall serve him. He shall be called the son of the Great God, and by his name shall he be hailed as the Son of God, and they shall call him Son of the Most High.

— Dead Sea scrolls manuscript Q4Q246, translated in "An Unpublished Dead Sea Scroll Text Parallels Luke's Infancy Narrative", Biblical Archaeology Review, April/May 1990

It has been suggested that the similarity in content is such that Luke's version may in some way be dependent on the Qumran text.

== Location ==
Both the Roman Catholic and Eastern Orthodox churches hold that the Annunciation took place at Nazareth, but differ slightly as to the precise location. Roman Catholic tradition holds that the Annunciation occurred in Mary's home, while Eastern Orthodox tradition holds that it occurred at the town well, known as Mary's Well. The Basilica of the Annunciation marks the site preferred by the former, while the Greek Orthodox Church of the Annunciation (around half a mile away) marks that preferred by the latter.

== Feast day ==
=== Western Christianity ===
The Feast of the Annunciation is usually held on 25 March. It is often translated in the Catholic Church, Anglican and Lutheran liturgical calendars when that date falls during Holy Week or Easter Week or on a Sunday.

When the calendar system of Anno Domini was first introduced by Dionysius Exiguus in AD 525, he assigned the beginning of the new year to 25 March since, according to Christian theology, the era of grace began with the Incarnation of Christ. The first certain mentions of the feast are in a canon of the 656 Council of Toledo, where it is described as celebrated throughout the church. The 692 Council of Constantinople "in Trullo" forbade observance of any festivals during Lent, excepting Sunday and the Annunciation. An earlier origin had been claimed for it on the grounds that it appeared in manuscripts of the sermons of Athanasius and Gregory Thaumaturgus but they were subsequently discovered to be spurious.

Along with Easter, 25 March was historically used as the New Year's Day in many Christian countries. The holiday was moved to 1 January in France by Charles IX's 1564 Edict of Roussillon. In England, the feast of the Annunciation came to be known as Lady Day, and Lady Day marked the beginning of the English new year until 1752.

=== Eastern Christianity ===
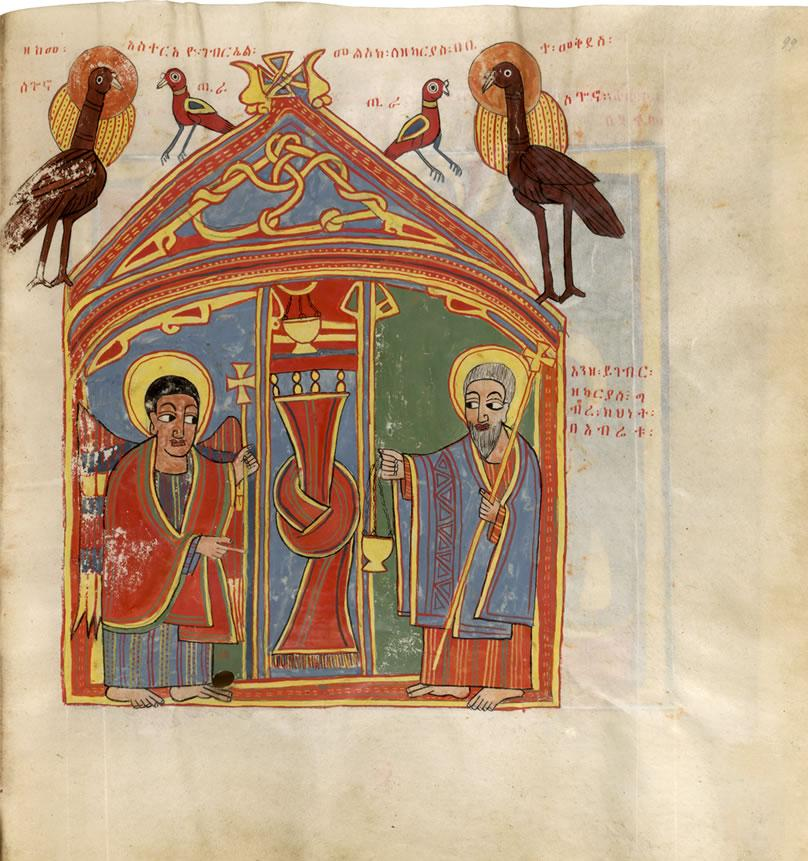
Annunciation to Zechariah, taken from an Ethiopian Bible (c. 1700), British Library

In the Eastern Orthodox, Eastern Catholic, and Oriental Orthodox Churches, the Feast of the Annunciation is one of the twelve "Great Feasts" of the liturgical year, and is among the eight of them that are counted as "feasts of the Lord". Throughout the Orthodox Church, the feast is celebrated on 25 March. In the churches that use the new-style calendar (Revised Julian or Gregorian), this date coincides with 25 March on the civil calendar, while in those churches using the old-style Julian calendar, 25 March is reckoned to fall on 7 April on the civil calendar, and will fall on 8 April starting in the year 2100. Greek Independence Day is celebrated on the feast of the Annunciation and 25 March is also a national holiday in the Lebanon.

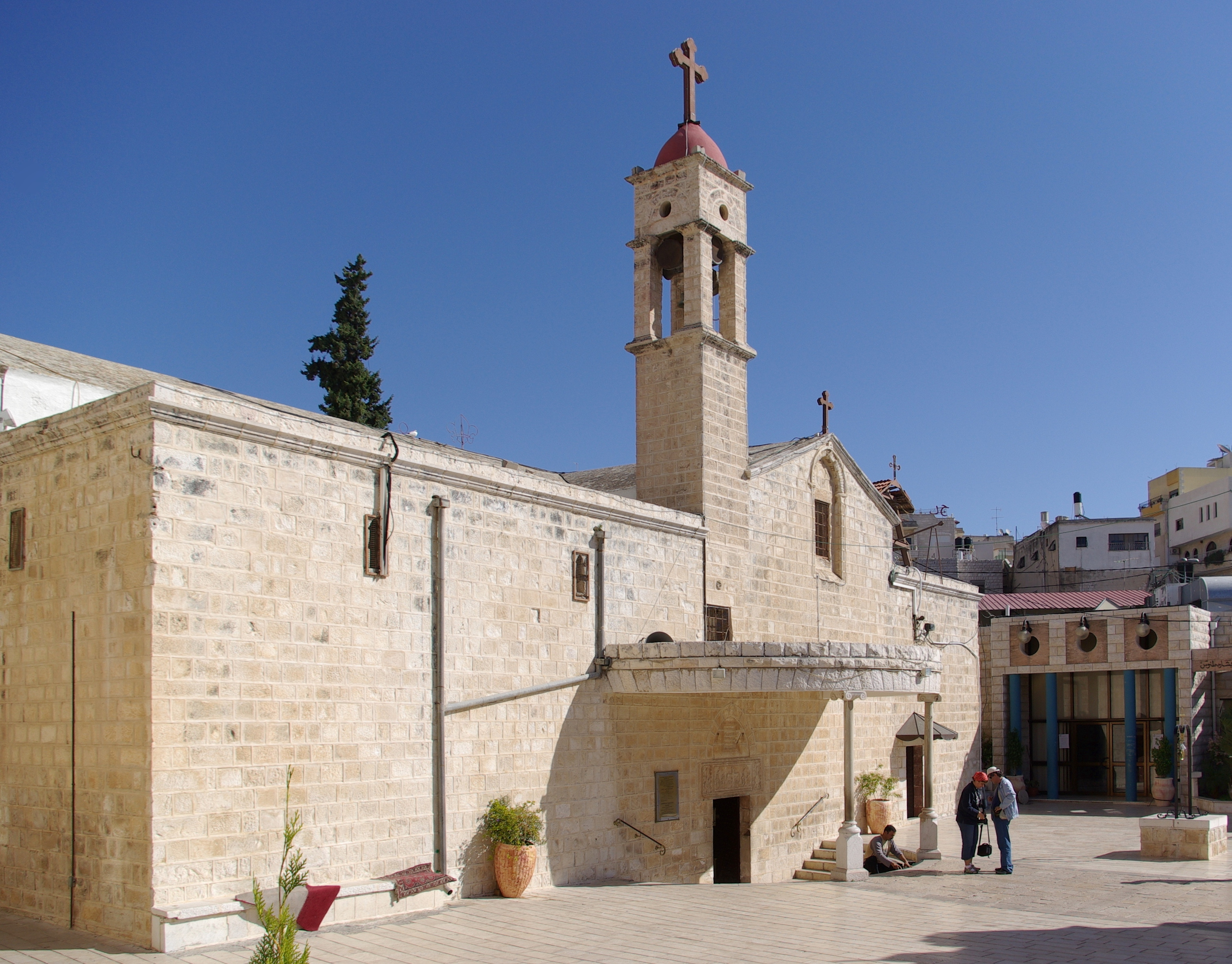
Greek Orthodox Church of the Annunciation, Nazareth

The traditional hymn (troparion) for the feast of the Annunciation goes back to Athanasius of Alexandria. It runs:

Today is the beginning of our salvation,
And the revelation of the eternal mystery!
The Son of God becomes the Son of the Virgin
As Gabriel announces the coming of Grace.
Together with him let us cry to the Theotokos: (Note: In Eastern Orthodoxy, Mary is referred to as Theotokos (Ancient Greek: Θεοτόκος, from Θεο, theo-, 'God', and τοκος, tokos, 'bearer').)
"Rejoice, O Full of Grace, the Lord is with you!"

As the action initiating the Incarnation of Christ, the Annunciation has such an important place in Orthodox Christian theology that the festal Divine Liturgy of John Chrysostom is always celebrated on the feast, even if it falls on Great and Holy Friday, the day when the crucifixion of Jesus is remembered. The Divine Liturgy is celebrated on Great and Holy Friday only when the latter coincides with the feast of the Annunciation. If the Annunciation falls on Pascha (Easter Sunday) itself, a coincidence which is called Kyriopascha, then it is celebrated jointly with the Resurrection, which is the focus of Easter. Due to these and similar rules, the rubrics surrounding the celebration of the feast are the most complex of all in Orthodox Christian liturgics.

Ephraim the Syrian taught that the date of the conception of Jesus Christ fell on 10 Nisan on the Hebrew calendar, the day in which the Passover lamb was selected according to Exodus 12 (Hymn 4 on the Nativity). In some years, 10 Nisan falls on 25 March, which is the traditional date for the Feast of the Annunciation and is an official holiday in Lebanon.

== In art ==
The Annunciation has been one of the most frequent subjects of Christian art. Depictions of the Annunciation go back to early Christianity, with the Priscilla catacomb including the oldest known fresco of the Annunciation, dating to the 4th century. It has been a favorite artistic subject in both the Christian East and as Roman Catholic Marian art, particularly during the Middle Ages and Renaissance, and figures in the repertoire of almost all of the great masters. The figures of the Virgin Mary and the angel Gabriel, being emblematic of purity and grace, were favorite subjects of Roman Catholic Marian art, where the scene is also used to represent the perpetual virginity of Mary via the announcement by the angel Gabriel that Mary would conceive a child to be born the Son of God.

Works on the subject have been created by artists such as Sandro Botticelli, Leonardo da Vinci, Caravaggio, Duccio, Henry Ossawa Tanner, Jan van Eyck, and Murillo among others. The mosaics of Pietro Cavallini in Santa Maria in Trastevere in Rome (1291), the frescos of Giotto in the Scrovegni Chapel in Padua (1303), Domenico Ghirlandaio's fresco at the church of Santa Maria Novella in Florence (1486), and Donatello's gilded sculpture at the church of Santa Croce, Florence (1435) are famous examples.

The Annunciation in Armenian art by Toros Taronetsi, 1323

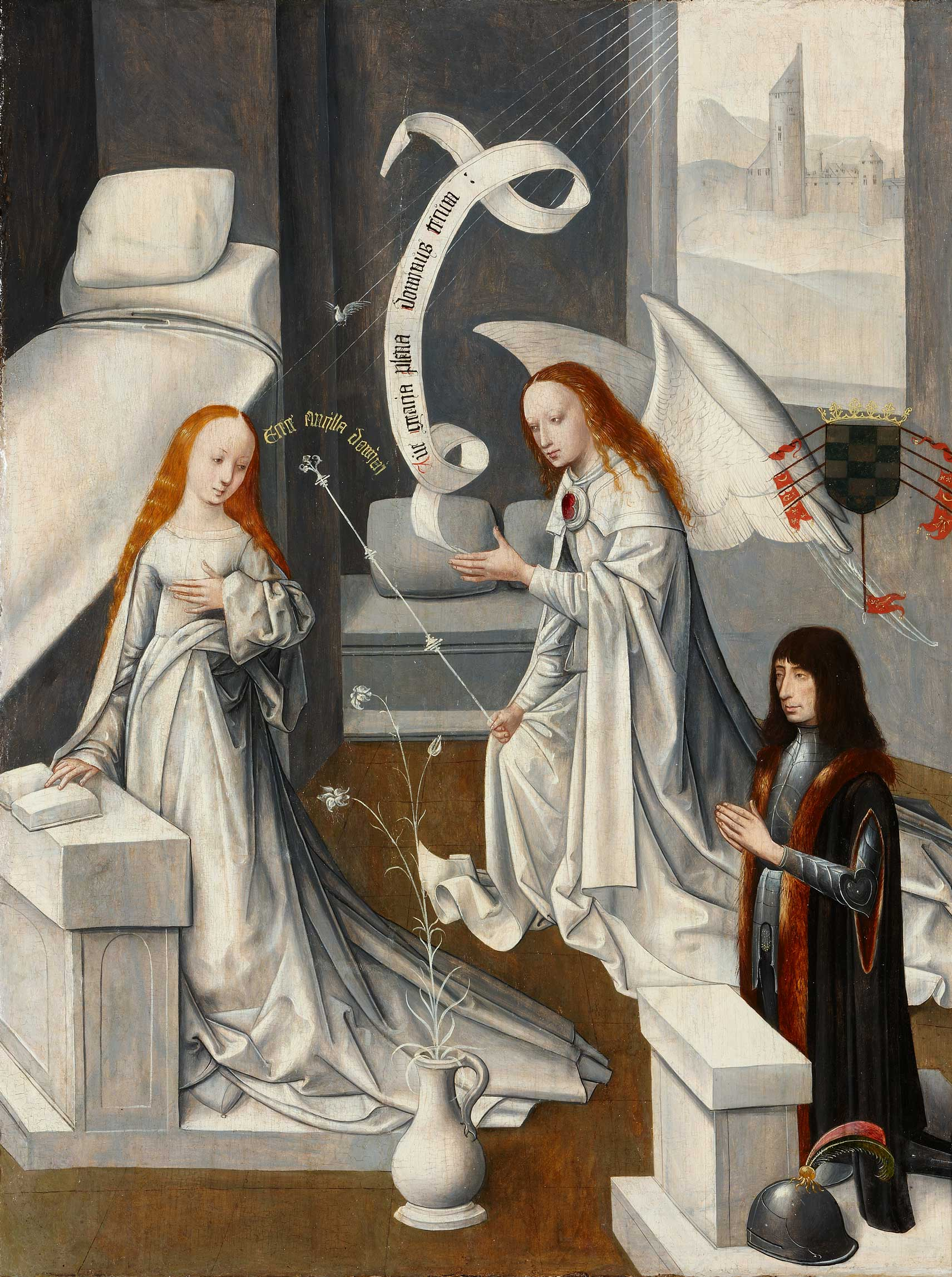
Annunciation with the 1st Duke of Alba by the Master of the Virgo inter Virgines, end of the 15th century

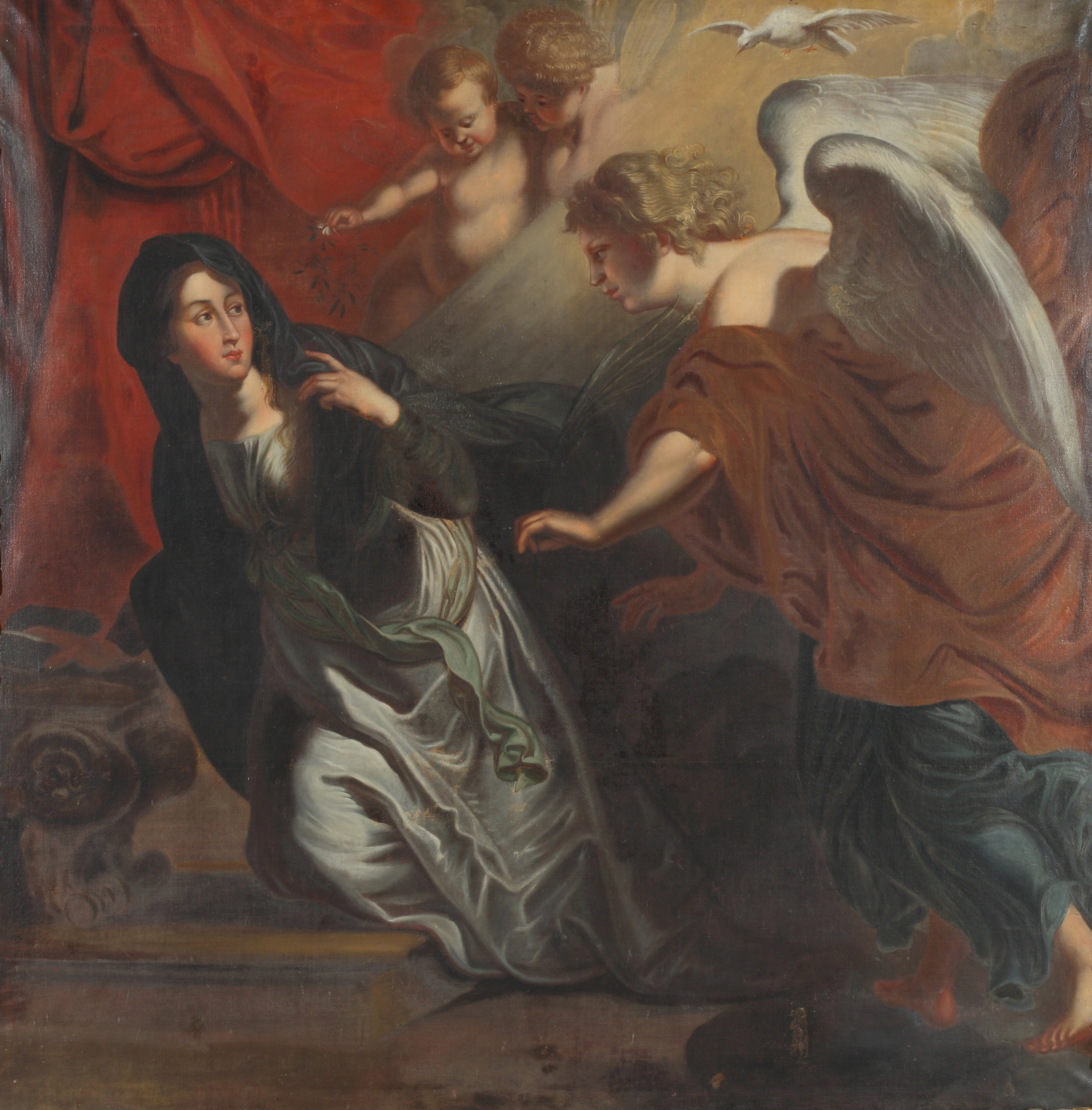
The Annunciation by Johann Christian Schröder, c. 1690

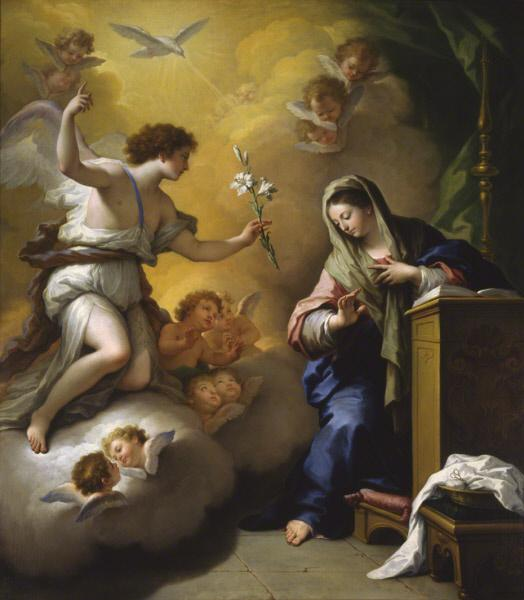
The Annunciation by Paolo de Matteis, 1712, Saint Louis Art Museum, Saint Louis. The white lily in the angel's hand is symbolic of Mary's purity (Note: Purity is a wider concept than virginity, which is comprised within it, but which relates to a physical aspect only of purity.) in Marian art.

=== Music ===
Hans Leo Hassler composed a motet Dixit Maria, setting Mary's consent. Johann Sebastian Bach and others composed cantatas for the Feast of the Annunciation which is still celebrated in the Lutheran Church, such as Wie schön leuchtet der Morgenstern, BWV 1.

== See also ==
- Angelus
- Annunciade, religious order
- Annunciation of Ustyug
- Basilica of the Annunciation
- Chronology of Jesus
- Expectation of the Blessed Virgin Mary
- Greek Orthodox Church of the Annunciation, Nazareth
- Incarnation (Christianity)
- Order of the Most Holy Annunciation
- Roman Catholic Marian art
- Perpetual Virginity of Mary

== Citations ==
Annunciation Life of Jesus: Ministry
Preceded by Gabriel announces John's birth to Zechariah	New Testament; Events	Succeeded by Mary visits Elizabeth
