= Order of the Most Holy Annunciation =

Roman Catholic religious order of contemplative nuns

- Abbreviation: Order of the Most Holy Annunciation (O.SS.A.)
- Formation: 17th century
- Type: Roman Catholic religious order
- Headquarters: Ordine della Santissima Annunziata; Via Pietro Dellepiane 49, San Cipriano di Serra Riccò, 16010, Genova (Italia)
- Website: www.monacheordineannunziataceleste.it

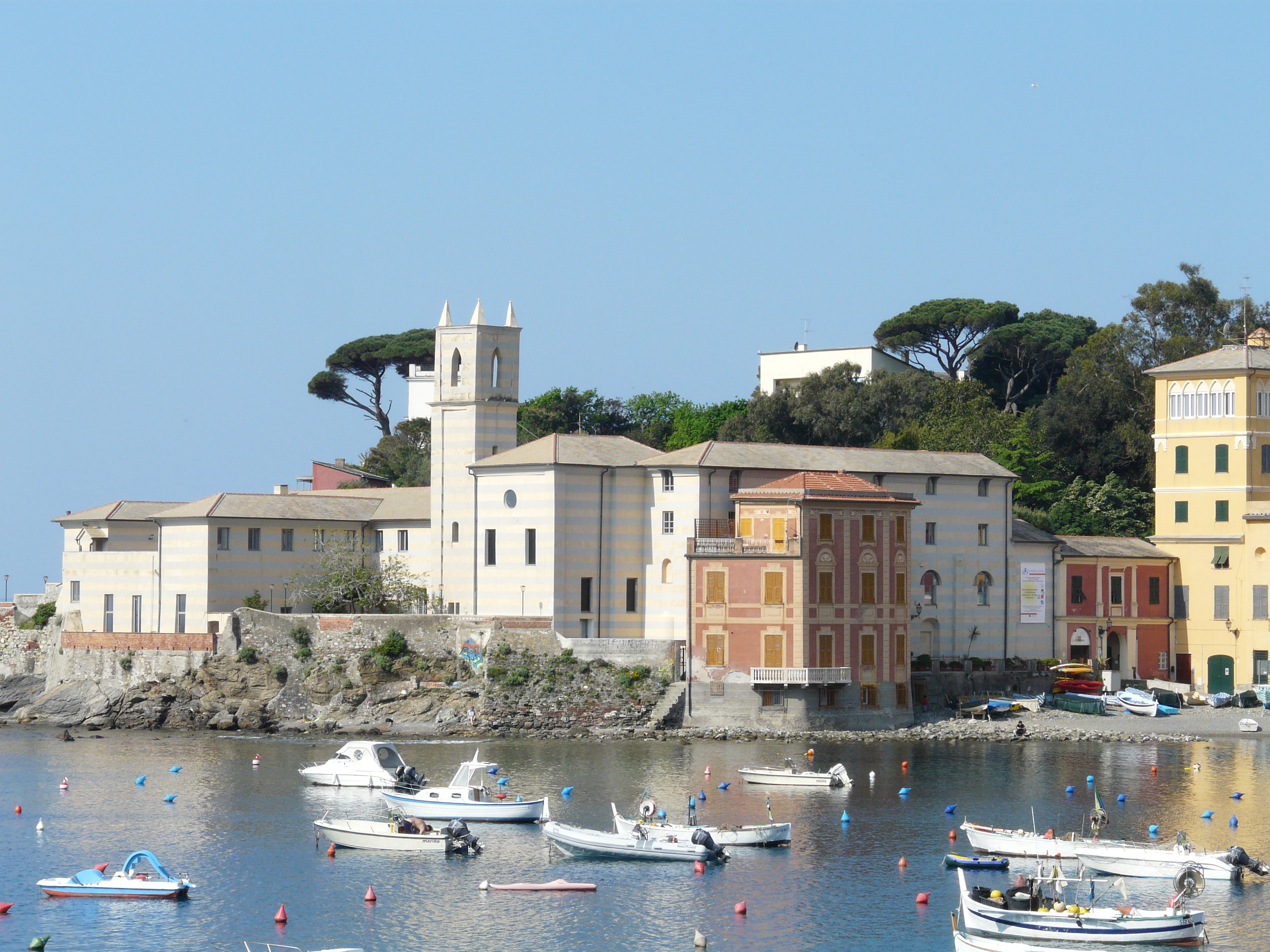
Annunciation Monastery, Sestri Levante

The Order of the Most Holy Annunciation (OMHA) (Latin: Ordo Sanctissimae Annuntiationis), also known as the Turchine or Blue Nuns, as well as the Celestine Nuns, is a Roman Catholic religious order of contemplative nuns formed at Genoa, Italy, by Blessed Maria Vittoria De Fornari Strata in honour of the mystery of the Incarnation of Christ .

== History ==
Pope Clement VIII approved the religious order on 5 August 1604, placing it under the Rule of Saint Augustine. In 1676 the Venerable Princess Donna Camilla Orsini Borghese founded a convent on the Esquiline Hill near the Basilica of Saint Mary Major.

After the convent was sequestered by the state in 1873, their church, it:Chiesa di Santa Maria Annunziata delle Turchine, became part of a military establishment making uniforms for the army. The nuns moved to various locations before settling at a convent in the Via Portuense.

The nuns take solemn vows of chastity, poverty, obedience, and enclosure. Their prayer life includes the Liturgy of the Hours. Some nuns engage in sewing vestments and religious habits to provide the necessary support for the community.

The religious order currently has monasteries in Portugal (Fatima), in Italy, and in the Philippines.

== See also ==
- Annunciade
- Order of the Annunciation of the Blessed Virgin Mary
