= Maria Vittoria De Fornari Strata =

Italian Roman Catholic nun

Blessed Maria Vittoria De Fornari Strata
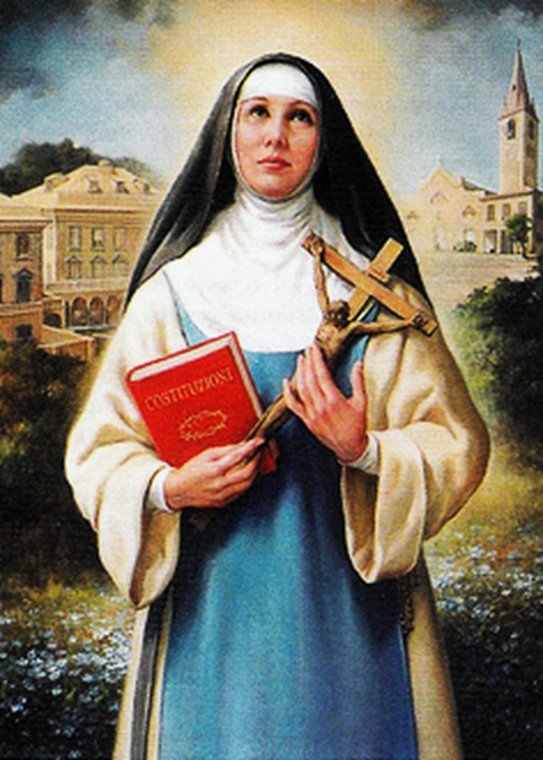
- Portrait

Religious
- Born: 1562; Genoa, Republic of Genoa
- Died: 15 December 1617 (aged 55); Genoa, Republic of Genoa
- Venerated in: Roman Catholic Church
- Beatified: 21 September 1828, Saint Peter's Basilica, Papal States by Pope Leo XII
- Feast: 15 December
- Attributes: Religious habit
- Patronage: Order of the Annunciation

Maria Vittoria De Fornari Strata (1562 – 15 December 1617) was an Italian Roman Catholic nun and the foundress of the Order of the Annunciation – or Blue Nuns. Fornari was married for just under a decade and decided not to find another spouse after having a vision of the Madonna who instructed her to lead a chaste life of motherhood. The widow decided to found an order not long after this, based on the Carmelite charism.

Her beatification was held on 21 September 1828.

== Life ==
Maria Vittoria De Fornari was born in 1562 in Genoa into a noble family, as the seventh of nine children to Girolamo Fornari and Barbara Veneroso. Although she was attracted to religious life, she submitted to her father's wishes and at the age of seventeen, on 21 March 1579, married Angelo Strata. It was a happy marriage. The couple had six children: Angela, Barbara, Giuseppe, Leonardo, Alessandro, and Angelo (1587–97).

In late 1587, her husband fell ill and died not long after on 30 November 1587. She was pregnant with her final child at the point of being widowed and decided to name him in honour of her late spouse. Fornari considered finding another spouse due to her children requiring greater paternal care but she experienced a vision in which the Madonna encourages her not to fear, and to be assured of her protection.

Her eldest daughter, Angela, became a member of the Canonesses Regular of the Lateran - as did Barbara not long after - while Giuseppe entered the Minims with Leonardo and Alessandro following him.

Widowed after eight years, she first devoted herself to works of charity. In 1604, she and ten friends - including Vicentina Lomellini Centurio and Maria Tacchini - made private vows for faith renewal and used a grant from a rich friend to purchase a house for their religious activities. Her other companions included the sisters Chiara and Cecilia Spinola.

She and four other women received the habit of the new order on 5 August 1604. She made her profession on 7 September 1605 after she rallied from a serious illness. She served as superior from the order's founding until ill health saw her not re-elected in 1611, which she accepted with grace and tact. Her order received pontifical approval from Pope Paul V on 6 August 1613.

Strata died on 15 December 1617 due to lung disease after having predicted the date of her own death. She is interred in Genoa.

== Beatification ==
The beatification cause started under Pope Benedict XIV on 10 September 1746 and the late religious was titled as a Servant of God while Pope Clement XIII confirmed her heroic virtue and named her as Venerable on 1 April 1759. Pope Leo XII later approved two miracles attributed to her intercession on 1 April 1828 and later beatified her in Saint Peter's Basilica on 21 September 1828.

== See also ==
- Order of the Annunciation
- Enclosed religious orders
