= Twiste =

Twiste may refer to:

- Twiste (Diemel), a river of Hesse and of North Rhine-Westphalia, Germany
- Twiste (Oste), a river of Lower Saxony, Germany
