= List of rivers of Lower Saxony =

All rivers in the German state of Lower Saxony flow directly or indirectly into the North Sea.

== A–Z ==
=== A ===
- Abelitz
- Abzucht
- Ahle
- Ahler Bruchgraben
- Aland
- Aller
- Allerbach
- Allerbeeke
- Alpe
- Alte Aller
- Alte Hehlenriede
- Altenau
- Annenriede
- Apenke
- Aper Tief
- Aschau
- Aue, tributary of the Elbe (as Lühe)
- Aue, tributary of the Leine
- Aue, tributary of the Oste
- Aue, tributary of the Suhle
- Aue, tributary of the Weser
- Ausbütteler Riede
- Auschnippe

=== B ===
- Beberbach, tributary of the Hunne
- Beberbach, tributary of the Schunter
- Beek
- Berne
- Beuster
- Bever
- Beverbach
- Bewer
- Bickgraben
- Blankenwaters Wiesengraben
- Blender Emte
- Böhme
- Bomlitz
- Braker Sieltief
- Bramstedter Beeke
- Breitenbeek
- Breitentalbach
- Bremke
- Bruchwetter
- Brunau, tributary of the Luhe
- Brunau, tributary of the Örtze
- Brunnenbach
- Bückeburger Aue
- Bückener Mühlenbach
- Burgdorfer Aue

=== D ===
- Dadau
- Delme
- Dieße
- Dinkel
- Dramme
- Drepte
- Dünsener Bach
- Dürre Holzminde
- Düte

=== E ===
- Ecker
- Ehlbeck
- Eipenke
- Eiter
- Elbe
- Eller
- Else
- Eltingmühlenbach
- Emmelke
- Emmer
- Ems
- Eschbach
- Eschenhäuser Beeke
- Espolde
- Este
- Exter

=== F ===
- Fehntjer Tief
- Finkenbach
- Fintau
- Flumm
- Fluthamel
- Fösse
- Fuhse
- Fulda
- Fulde

=== G ===
- Gande
- Garbeeke
- Garte
- Geeste
- Gehle
- Gelmke
- Gerdau
- Giehler Bach
- Gohbach
- Goldbach
- Goldenke
- Gose
- Grade Lutter
- Grane
- Grawiede
- Grenzaa
- Grindau
- Grone
- Gropenborn
- Große Aa
- Große Aue
- Große Kulmke
- Große Lonau
- Große Schweimke
- Große Steinau
- Großer Graben and Schiffgraben
- Grumbach

=== H ===
- Haaren
- Hache
- Hahle
- Hahnenbach
- Haller
- Halsebach
- Hamel
- Hamme
- Harle
- Harste
- Hase
- Hasenburger Mühlenbach
- Hasselbach
- Hehlenriede
- Heibeek
- Heiligenloher Beeke
- Helle
- Hellegrundbach
- Holzminde
- Hombach
- Hopstener Aa
- Humme
- Hunte

=== I ===
- Ichte
- Ihme
- Ilme
- Ilmenau
- Ilse, tributary of the Oker
- Ilse, tributary of the Weser
- Ilster
- Innerste
- Ise

=== J ===
- Jade
- Jeetzel
- Jordanbach
- Jümme

=== K ===
- Katenbäke
- Kilverbach
- Kirchwehrener Landwehr
- Kleine Aller
- Kleine Aue
- Kleine Kulmke
- Kleine Lonau
- Kleine Örtze
- Kleine Schweimke
- Kleine Steinau
- Klosterbach
- Knockster Tief
- Köttelbeck
- Krähenkuhlenfleet
- Krainke
- Krumme Lutter
- Krummes Wasser
- Kuhbach
- Kulmke
- Kupferstrang

=== L ===
- Lachte
- Lamme
- Laute
- Leda
- Lee
- Lehrde
- Leine
- Lenne
- Lerbach
- Lesum
- Lethe
- Levester Bach
- Löcknitz
- Lohnder Bach
- Lohne
- Lonau
- Lopau
- Luhe
- Lühe
- Lune, tributary of the Weser
- Lutter, tributary of the Lachte
- Lutter, tributary of the Leine
- Lutter, tributary of the Oder
- Lutter, tributary of the Schunter
- Lutterbach

=== M ===
- Marka
- Medem
- Meerbach
- Mehde-Aue
- Mehe
- Meiße
- Mettinger Aa
- Mittelradde
- Mittelriede
- Möseke
- Mühlenriede

=== N ===
- Nährenbach
- Neetze
- Neile
- Nette, tributary of the Hase
- Nette, tributary of the Innerste
- Niederelbe
- Nieme
- Nienstedter Beeke
- Nieste
- Norder Tief
- Nordradde

=== O ===
- Ochtum
- Oder
- Ohe
- Ohebach
- Ohre
- Oker
- Ollen
- Örtze
- Ospenke
- Oste
- Otterbach

=== P ===
- Purrmühlenbach

=== R ===
- Radau
- Ramme
- Recker Aa
- Reiherbach
- Rhume
- Rodau
- Rodenberger Aue
- Rögnitz
- Rötgesbütteler Riede

=== S ===
- Saale
- Sachsenhäger Aue
- Sagter Ems
- Schadenbeek
- Scharmbecker Bach
- Schede
- Scheppau
- Schmalwasser
- Schönebecker Aue
- Schorlingborsteler Beeke
- Schunter
- Schwarze Kulmke
- Schweiburg
- Schwienau
- Schwinge
- Schwülme
- Seeve
- Sieber
- Siede
- Soeste
- Soltau
- Söse
- Speller Aa
- Sperrlutter
- Spüligbach, tributary of the Ilme
- Spüligbach, tributary of the Lenne
- Stederau
- Steinaer Bach, also called Steina, upper course of the Ichte
- Steinbach
- Steinhuder Meerbach
- Stollenbach
- Strothe
- Südaue
- Sude
- Südradde
- Suhle
- Sule
- Süstedter Bach

=== T ===
- Tiefenbeek
- Trillkebach
- Trutenbeek
- Twiste

=== U ===
- Uffe
- Ulrichswasser
- Unterelbe

=== V ===
- Varreler Bäke
- Vechte
- Veerse
- Verlorene Kulmke
- Vethbach
- Viehmoorgraben
- Violenbach
- Vissel
- Vollbütteler Riede

=== W ===
- Wabe
- Wagenfelder Aue
- Wapel
- Warme Bode
- Warmenau
- Warnau
- Warne
- Wäschegrund
- Wätering
- Weende
- Weesener Bach
- Weeser Aa
- Wennigser Mühlbach
- Werra
- Weser
- Westaue
- Westergate
- Wieda
- Wiedau
- Wienbeck
- Wieste
- Wietze, tributary of the Aller
- Wietze, tributary of the Örtze
- Wölpe
- Wörpe
- Wriedeler Bach
- Wümme
- Wustrower Dumme

=== Z ===
- Zellbach
- Zorge

== By basin ==
This list uses bullets and indents to show the rivers' hierarchy and the sequence from river mouth to source. The number of indents corresponds to the river's position in the sequence.

Tributaries are shown orographically as either a left (l) or a right (r) tributary of the next waterway in the downstream direction.

=== Elbe ===
- Elbe (1,091 kilometres (678 mi), into the North Sea)
  - Medem (l)
    - Emmelke
  - Oste (l) (153 km)
    - Aue (tributary of the Oste) (l) (14 km)
    - Mehe (l)
    - Bever (r)
    - Twiste (r)
    - Ramme (r)
  - Schwinge (l)
  - Lühe (l)
    - Aue (tributary of the Elbe) (26 km)
  - Este (l)
  - Seeve (l) (40 km)
  - Ilmenau (l) (107 km)
    - Luhe (l) (58 km)
    - Neetze (r) (48 km)
    - Gerdau (30 km)
    - Stederau
  - Jeetzel (l) (73 km)
  - Aland (l) (27 km)
  - Ohre (l) (103 km)
  - Saale (l) (Saxony-Anhalt)
    - Bode (l) (169 km)
    - Unstrut (l) (Thuringia)
      - Helme (l) (Thuringia)
        - Zorge (l)
          - Wieda (r)
            - Uffe (r)

=== Weser ===
- Weser (452 kilometres (281 mi), into the North Sea)
  - Geeste (r) (>25 km)
  - Abbehauser Sieltief (l)
  - Lune (r) (43 km)
  - Schweiburg (left branch of Weser river)
    - Strohauser Sieltief (l)
  - Drepte (r)
  - Rechter Nebenarm der Weser (right branch of Weser river)
    - Aschwardener Flutgraben
  - Braker Sieltief (l)
  - Käseburger Sieltief (l)
  - Hunte (l) (198 km)
    - Haaren (l)
    - Lethe (l)
  - Westergate (left branch of Weser river)
  - Schönebecker Aue (r)
  - Lesum (r) (10 km)
    - Hamme (48 km)
      - Scharmbecker Bach (r)
        - Wienbeck (r)
      - Beek (r)
    - Wümme (118 km)
      - Wörpe (r)
      - Wieste (r)
      - Rodau (l)
        - Vissel (l)
      - Wiedau (l)
      - Veerse (l)
      - Fintau (l)
  - Ochtum (l)
    - Delme (l)
    - Varreler Bäke (l)
    - Hache (l)
  - Aller (r) (211 km)
    - Gohbach (r) (20 km)
    - Lehrde (r) (22 km)
    - Böhme (r) (68 km)
      - Fulde (r) (11 km)
      - Warnau (r)
      - Bomlitz (r)
    - Leine (l) (281 km)
      - Grindau (r) (11 km)
      - Westaue (l)
        - Südaue (r)
          - Möseke (r)
        - Sachsenhäger Aue
        - Rodenberger Aue
      - Fösse (l)
      - Ihme (l) (16 km)
      - Innerste (r) (95 km)
        - Lamme (l)
        - Nette (l) (43 km)
      - Haller (l)
      - Saale (l)
      - Aue (tributary of the Leine) (r)
      - Ilme (l)
        - Dieße (r)
      - Rhume (r) (48 km)
        - Söse (r) (38 km)
          - Große Söse (l headstream)
          - Kleine Söse (r headstream)
          - Große Limpig (r)
          - Eipenke (l)
          - Ospenke (l)
          - Lerbach (r) (8 km)
          - Apenke (l)
          - Große Bremke (r)
          - Wellbeek (r)
          - Uferbach (r)
          - Sulpebach (r)
          - Markau (r)
          - Bierbach (r)
          - Dornkesbach (r)
          - Goldbach (r)
          - Salza (l)
          - Dorster Mühlenbach (l)
        - Oder (r) (56 km)
          - Pöhlder Beber (l)
          - Sperrlutter (r)
          - Lutter (tributary of the Oder) (r) (2.2 km)
          - Sieber (r) (35 km)
      - Garte (r) (23 km)
    - Wietze (l) (30 km)
    - Örtze (r) ( 55 km)
      - Wietze (r) (29 km)
    - Fuhse (l) (98 km)
      - Erse (r)
    - Lachte (r) (38 km)
      - Lutter (tributary of the Lachte) (r)
        - Köttelbeck (l)
        - Schmalwasser (l)
    - Oker (l) (105 km)
      - Schunter (r) (58 km)
        - Wabe (l)
        - Lutter (tributary of the Schunter) (l)
      - Altenau (r)
      - Warne (l)
      - Ilse (r) (40 km)
      - Ecker (r)
      - Radau (r)
      - Abzucht (l) (12.1 km)
        - Gose (l) (13 km)
        - Gelmke (r) (10 km)
        - Dörpke (r)
    - Ise (r) (50 km)
  - Meerbach (r)
  - Große Aue (l)
  - Aue (tributary of the Weser) (r)
  - Werre (l) (North Rhine-Westphalia)
    - Else (l) (35 km)
      - Warmenau (r)
      - Hase (169 km)
  - Hamel (r)
  - Emmer (l)
  - Ilse (r)
  - Lenne (r)
  - Schwülme (r)
    - Ahle (r)
  - Fulda
  - Werra

=== Ems ===
- Ems (371 kilometres (231 mi), into the North Sea)
  - Knockster Tief (r)
  - Fehntjer Tief (r)
    - Fehntjer Tief (southern branch)
    - Fehntjer Tief (northern branch)
      - Flumm (r)
  - Leda (r) (29 km)
    - Jümme (r)
      - Barßeler Tief
        - Soeste (l)
    - Sagter Ems (l)
  - Nordradde (r)
  - Hase (r)
    - Mittelradde (r)
    - Südradde (r)
  - Große Aa (r)

=== Vechte ===
- Vechte (167 kilometres (104 mi), into the Zwarte Water, Netherlands)
  - Dinkel (l) (93 km)
  - Coevorden-Vecht Canal (r) (Netherlands)
    - Coevorden-Piccardie Canal (l) (Netherlands)
      - Grenzaa (r)

=== Jade ===
- Jade (22 kilometres (14 mi), into the North Sea)
  - Maade (l)
  - Wapel (l)
