= Wapel =

Wapel may refer to:

- Wapel (Jade), a river of Lower Saxony, Germany, tributary of the Jade
- Wapelbach, also called Wapel, a river of North Rhine-Westphalia, Germany, tributary of the Dalke
