= Halsebach =

River in Germany

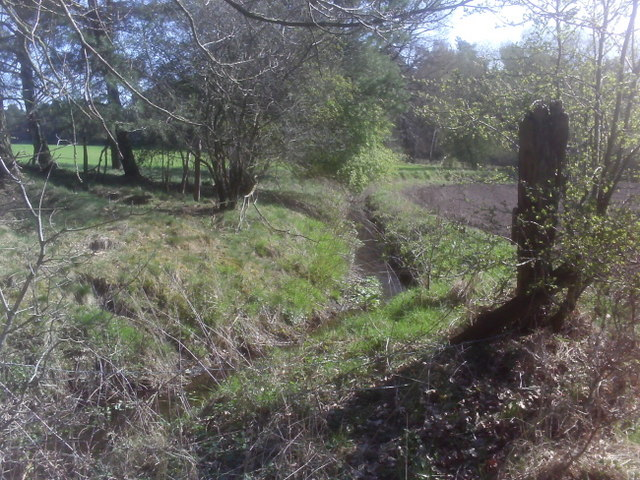

Location
- Country: Germany
- States: Lower Saxony

Physical characteristics
- Mouth
  - location: Aller
  - coordinates: 52.9384°N 9.2090°E

Basin features
- Progression: Aller→ Weser→ North Sea

Halsebach is a small river of Lower Saxony, Germany. It flows into the Aller near Verden.

== See also ==
- List of rivers of Lower Saxony
