= Bückener Mühlenbach =

River in Germany

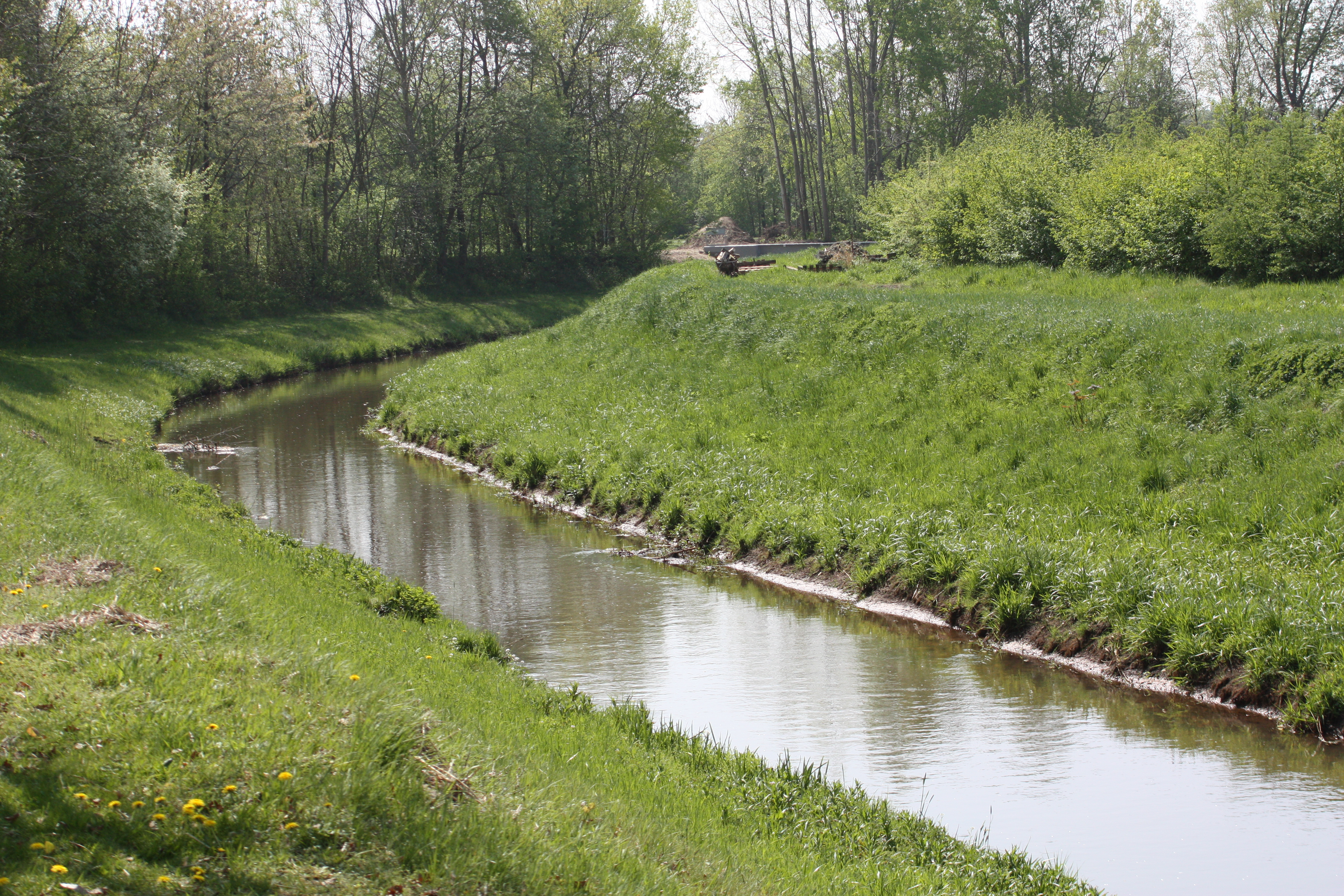

Location
- Country: Germany
- State: Lower Saxony

Physical characteristics
- Mouth
  - location: Weser
  - coordinates: 52°47′48″N 9°09′04″E
- Length: 14.5 km (9.0 mi)

Basin features
- Progression: Weser→ North Sea

Bückener Mühlenbach is a river of Lower Saxony, Germany. It flows into the Weser south of Hoya.

== See also ==
- List of rivers of Lower Saxony
