= Düte =

River in Germany

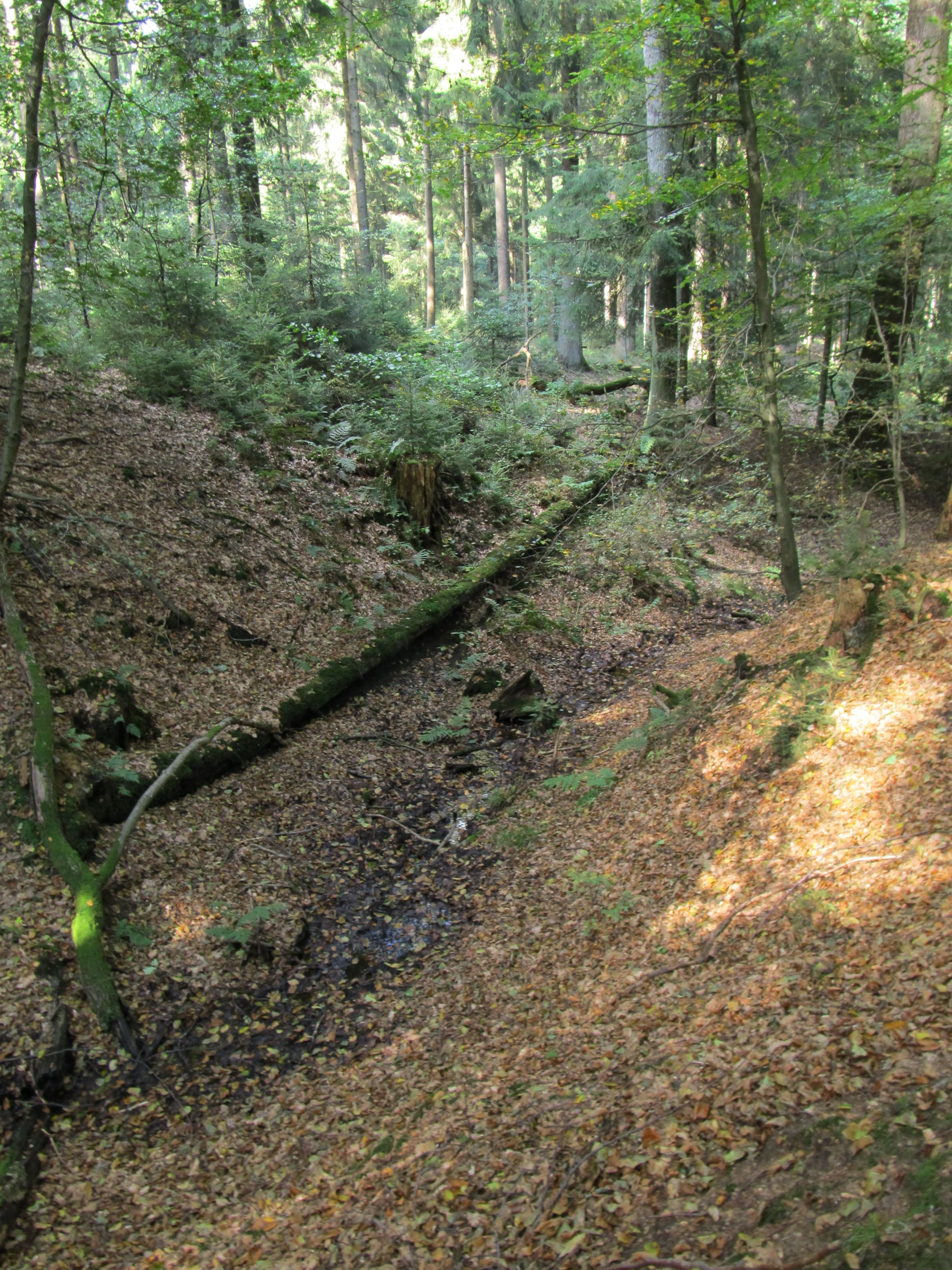
- Upper course of the Düte

Location
- Country: Germany
- State: Lower Saxony

Physical characteristics
- Mouth
  - location: Hase
  - coordinates: 52.3322°N 7.9546°E
- Length: 34.6 km (21.5 mi)
- Basin size: 232 km^{2} (90 sq mi)

Basin features
- Progression: Hase→ Ems→ North Sea

Düte is a river of Lower Saxony, Germany. It flows into the Hase northwest of Osnabrück.

== See also ==
- List of rivers of Lower Saxony
