= Haaren (river) =

River of Lower Saxony, Germany

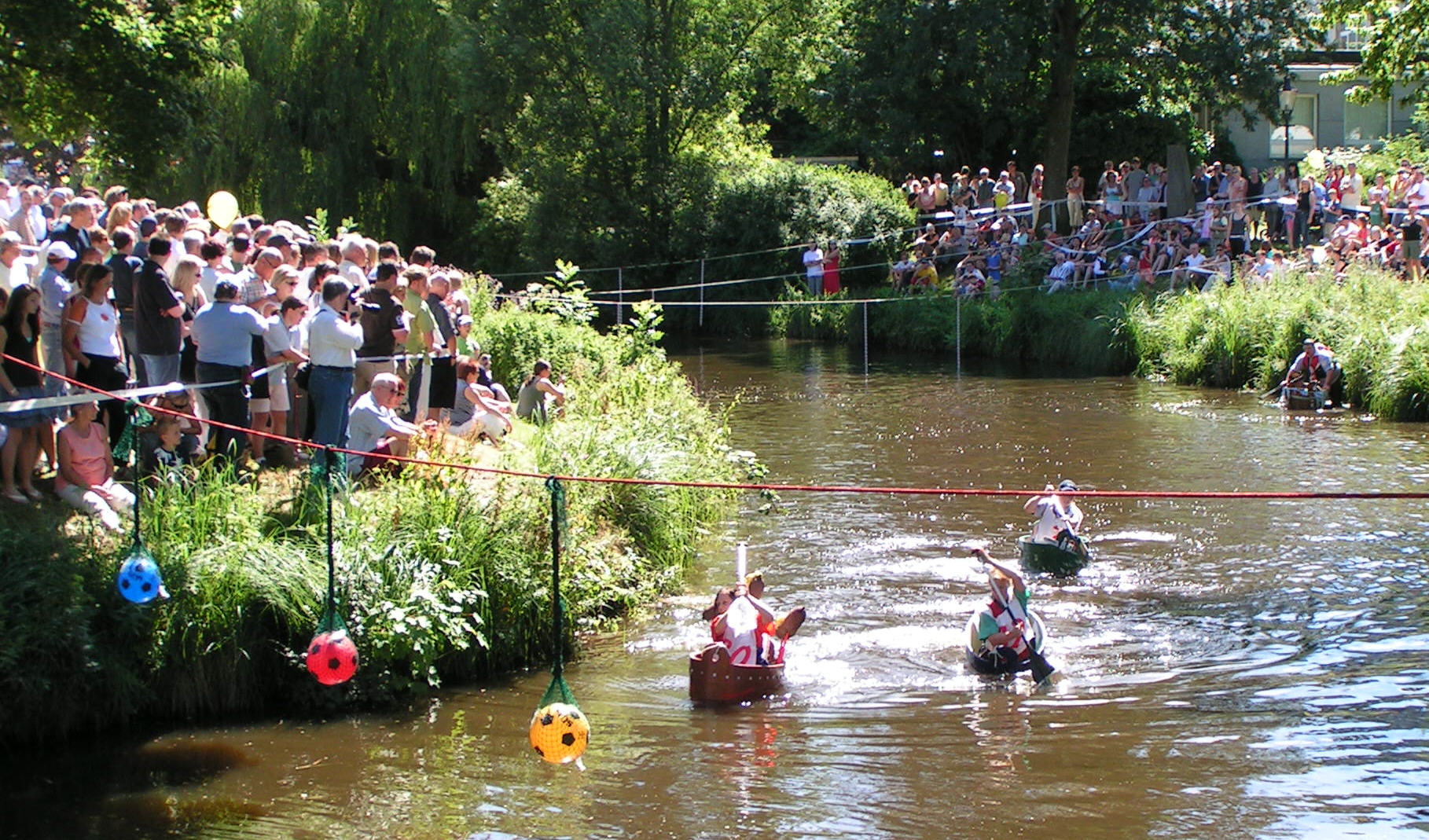

Location
- Country: Germany
- State: Lower Saxony

Physical characteristics
- Mouth
  - location: Hunte
  - coordinates: 53.1404°N 8.2199°E
- Length: 22.7 km (14.1 mi)

Basin features
- Progression: Hunte→ Weser→ North Sea

Haaren (German pronunciation: [ˈhaːʁən]) is a river of Lower Saxony, Germany. It flows into the Hunte in Oldenburg.

== See also ==
- List of rivers of Lower Saxony
