= Trutenbeek =

River in Germany

Location
- Country: Germany
- State: Lower Saxony

Physical characteristics
- Mouth
  - location: Oder
  - coordinates: 51.6956°N 10.5664°E

Basin features
- Progression: Oder→ Rhume→ Leine→ Aller→ Weser→ North Sea

Trutenbeek is a small river of Lower Saxony, Germany. It flows into the Oder southwest of Braunlage.

== See also ==
- List of rivers of Lower Saxony
