= Ilse (Weser) =

River in Germany

Location
- Country: Germany
- State: Lower Saxony

Physical characteristics
- Mouth
  - location: Weser
  - coordinates: 52°01′40″N 9°25′50″E
- Length: 15.1 km (9.4 mi)

Basin features
- Progression: Weser→ North Sea

Ilse is a river of Lower Saxony, Germany. It flows into the Weser near Emmerthal.

== See also ==
- List of rivers of Lower Saxony
