= Garbeeke =

River in Germany

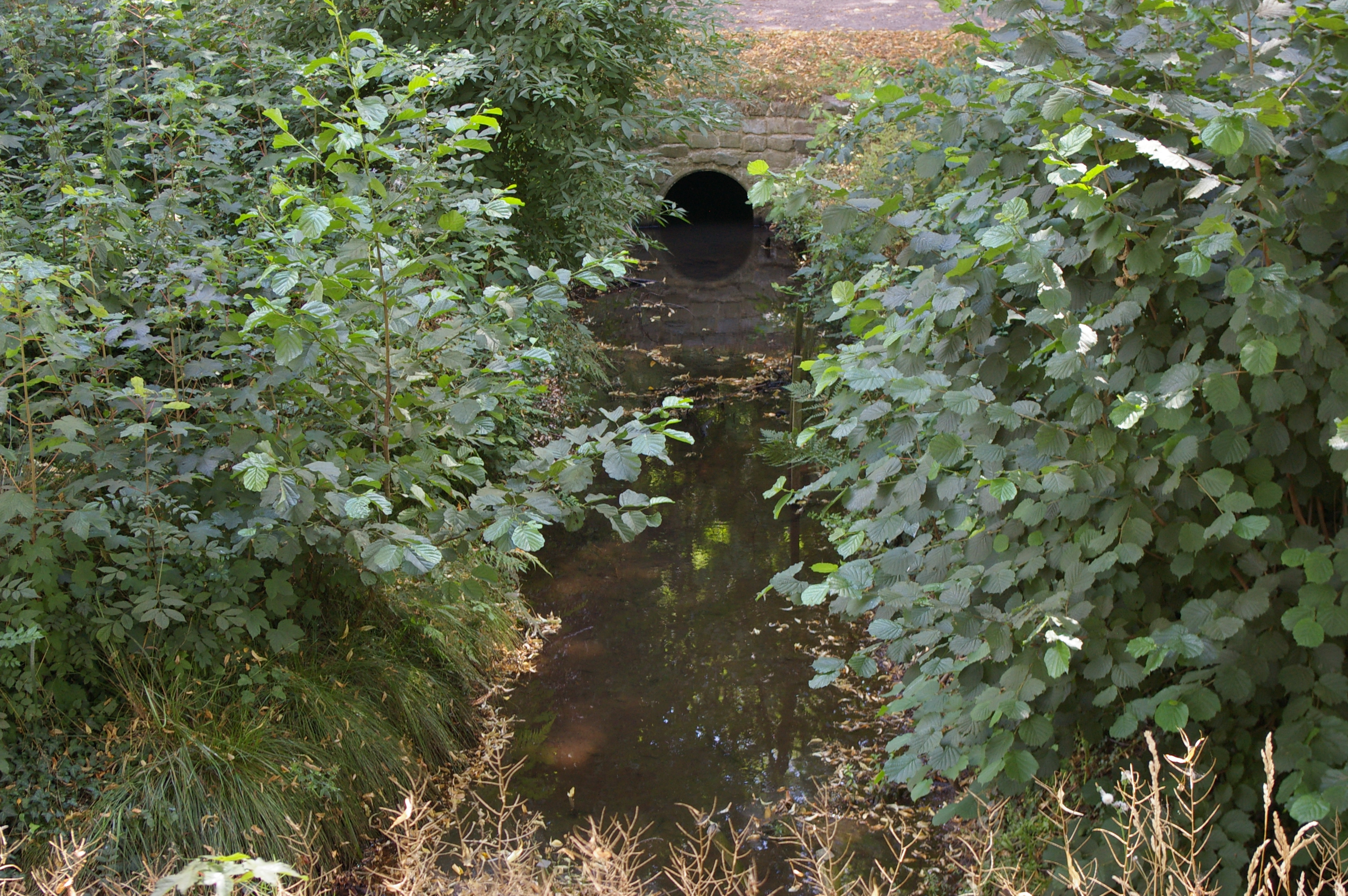

Location
- Country: Germany
- States: Lower Saxony

Physical characteristics
- Mouth
  - location: Varreler Bäke
  - coordinates: 52.8456°N 8.7152°E

Basin features
- Progression: Varreler Bäke→ Ochtum→ Weser→ North Sea

Garbeeke is a small river of Lower Saxony, Germany. It flows into the Klosterbach (the upper course of the Varreler Bäke) near Bassum.

== See also ==
- List of rivers of Lower Saxony
