= Südradde =

River in Germany

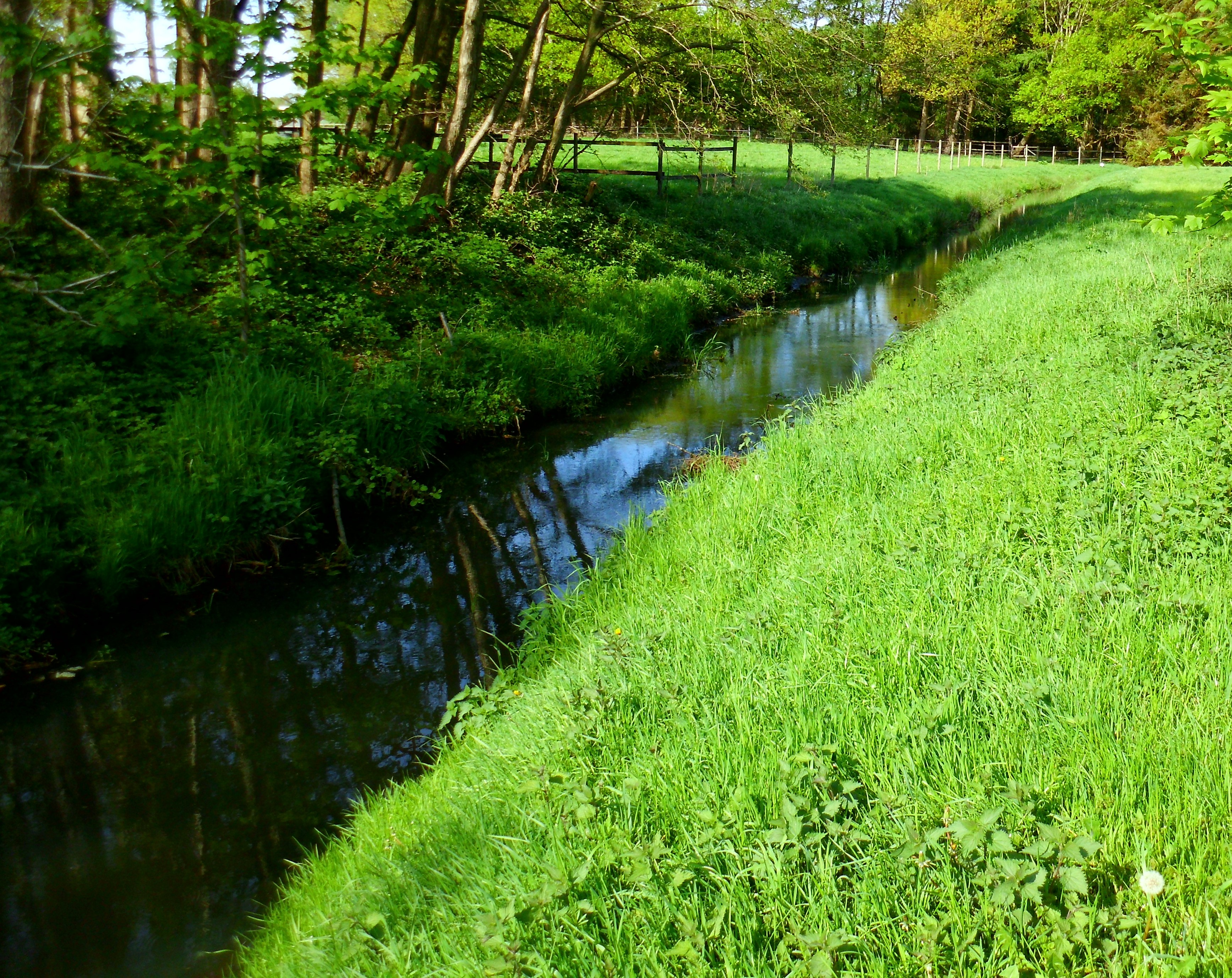

Location
- Country: Germany
- State: Lower Saxony

Physical characteristics
- Mouth
  - location: Hase
  - coordinates: 52.6873°N 7.5713°E
- Length: 31.5 km (19.6 mi)
- Basin size: 139 km^{2} (54 sq mi)

Basin features
- Progression: Hase→ Ems→ North Sea

Südradde is a river of Lower Saxony, Germany. It flows into the Hase near Herzlake.

== See also ==
- List of rivers of Lower Saxony
