= Otterbach (Weser) =

River in Germany

Location
- Country: Germany
- States: Lower Saxony; North Rhine-Westphalia

Physical characteristics
- Mouth
  - location: Weser
  - coordinates: 51.7952°N 9.4204°E

Basin features
- Progression: Weser→ North Sea

Otterbach (German pronunciation: [ˈɔtɐbax]) is a river of Lower Saxony and of North Rhine-Westphalia, Germany. It is 8.1 km (5.0 mi) long and is a right tributary of the Weser near Holzminden.

== Description ==
The Otterbach runs through a forested area in the Solling hills, and has steep sandstone embankments which are up to 30 metres (98 ft) high in some places.

== See also ==
- List of rivers of Lower Saxony
- List of rivers of North Rhine-Westphalia
