= Knockster Tief =

River in Germany

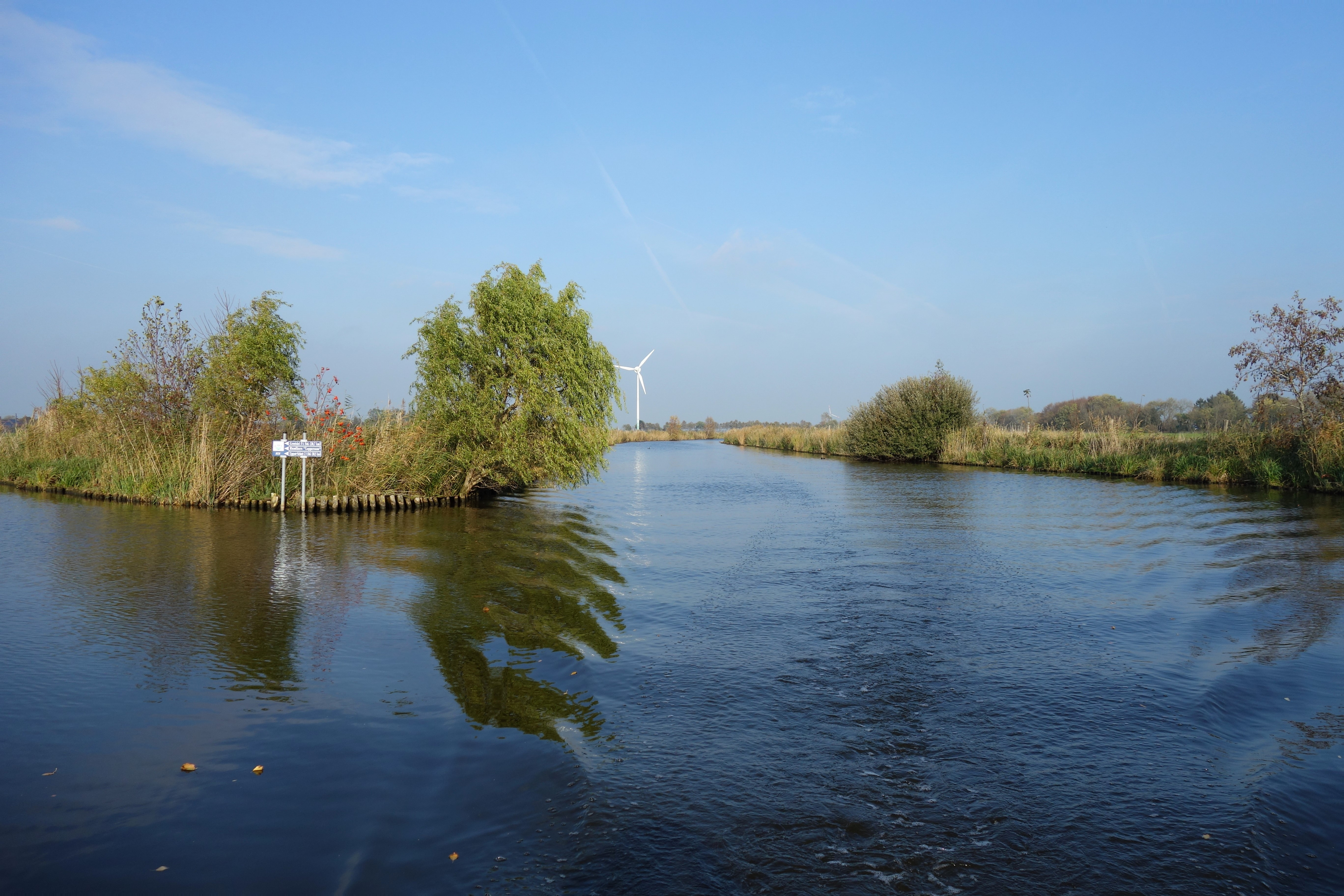

Location
- Country: Germany
- States: Lower Saxony

Physical characteristics
- Mouth
  - location: Ems
  - coordinates: 53.3367°N 7.0256°E

Basin features
- Progression: Ems→ North Sea

Knockster Tief is a river of Lower Saxony, Germany. It flows into the Ems west of Emden.

== See also ==
- List of rivers of Lower Saxony
