= Grindau =

River in Germany

Location
- Country: Germany
- State: Lower Saxony

Physical characteristics
- Source
  - location: Near Wedemark-Plumhof in the Viehbruch
  - elevation: 36 m
- Mouth
  - location: Near Grindau (a district of Schwarmstedt) into the Leine
  - coordinates: 52°38′52″N 9°35′59″E
  - elevation: 26 m above NN
- Length: 10.8 km (6.7 mi)
- Basin size: 35 km^{2} (14 sq mi)

Basin features
- Progression: Leine→ Aller→ Weser→ North Sea

The Grindau is an 11-kilometre-long (6.8 mi) right-hand tributary of the River Leine in Lower Saxony (Germany).

== Course ==
The Grindau rises in the Viehbruch near Wedemark-Plumhof and flows initially westwards via Lindwedel, Adolfsglück, Hope (both parts of Lindwebel), Esperke to the village of Grindau (part of Schwarmstedt), where it discharges into the Leine.

== See also ==
- List of rivers of Lower Saxony
