= Grone (river) =

River in Germany

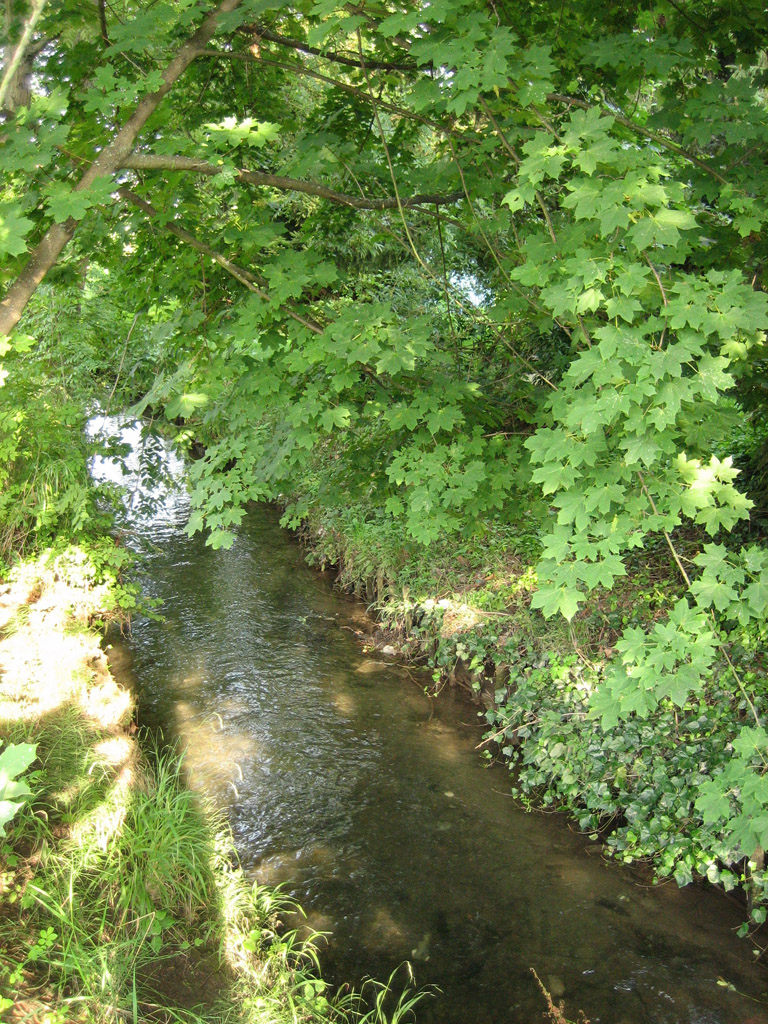

Location
- Country: Germany
- States: Lower Saxony

Physical characteristics
- Mouth
  - location: Leine
  - coordinates: 51.5623°N 9.9106°E

Grone is a small river of Lower Saxony, Germany. It flows into the Leine near Göttingen.

== See also ==
- List of rivers of Lower Saxony
