= Mehde-Aue =

River in Germany

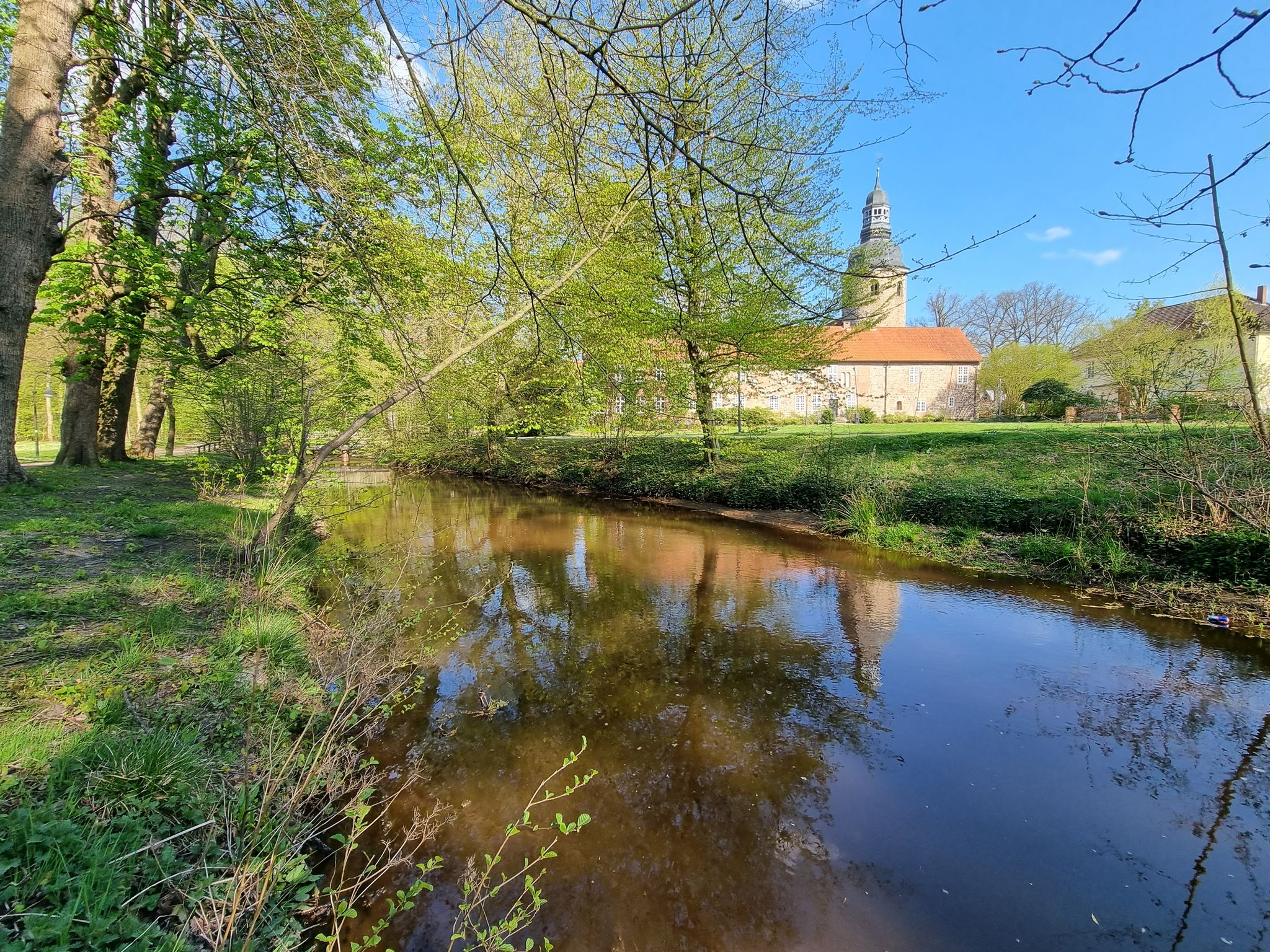

Location
- Country: Germany
- State: Lower Saxony

Physical characteristics
- Mouth
  - location: Oste
  - coordinates: 53.3179°N 9.2885°E
- Length: 19.8 km (12.3 mi)

Basin features
- Progression: Oste→ Elbe→ North Sea

Mehde-Aue is a river of Lower Saxony, Germany. It flows into the Oste near Zeven.

== See also ==
- List of rivers of Lower Saxony
