= Aue (Leine) =

River in Lower Saxony, Germany

- Location of the mouth

Location
- Country: Germany
- State: Lower Saxony

Physical characteristics
- Mouth
  - location: Leine
  - coordinates: 51°50′31″N 9°58′06″E
- Length: 22.6 km (14.0 mi)

Basin features
- Progression: Leine→ Aller→ Weser→ North Sea

Aue (German pronunciation: [ˈaʊə]; in its upper course: Kneppelbach) is a river of Lower Saxony, Germany. It flows into the Leine near Kreiensen.

== See also ==
- List of rivers of Lower Saxony
