= Harste (Leine) =

River in Germany

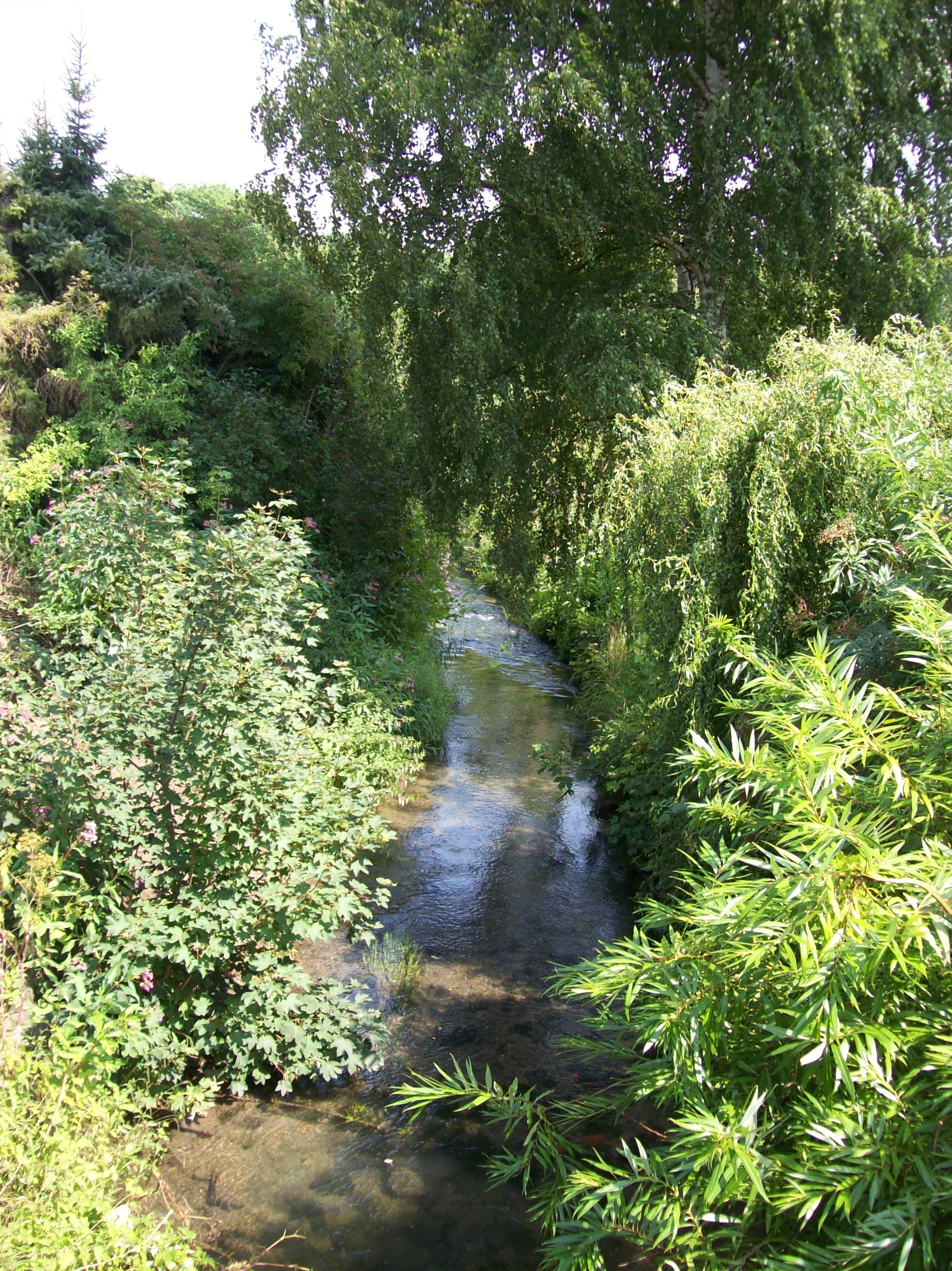

Location
- Country: Germany
- States: Lower Saxony

Physical characteristics
- Mouth
  - location: Leine
  - coordinates: 51.6148°N 9.9157°E

Basin features
- Progression: Leine→ Aller→ Weser→ North Sea

Harste is a small river of Lower Saxony, Germany. It flows into the Leine near Nörten-Hardenberg.

== See also ==
- List of rivers of Lower Saxony
