= Alte Aller =

River of Lower Saxony, Germany

Coordinates: 52.9284°N 9.2162°E

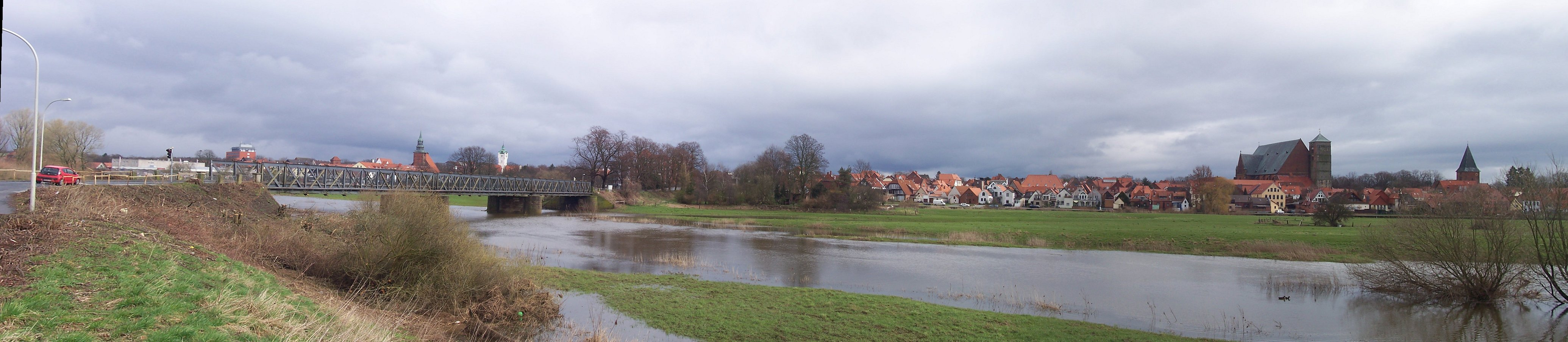
- Alte Aller at Verden an der Aller

- Location of mouth in Lower Saxony

Location
- Country: Germany
- State: Lower Saxony

Alte Aller refers to several old branches of the river Aller in Lower Saxony, Germany.

== See also ==
- List of rivers of Lower Saxony
