= Mittelradde =

River in Germany

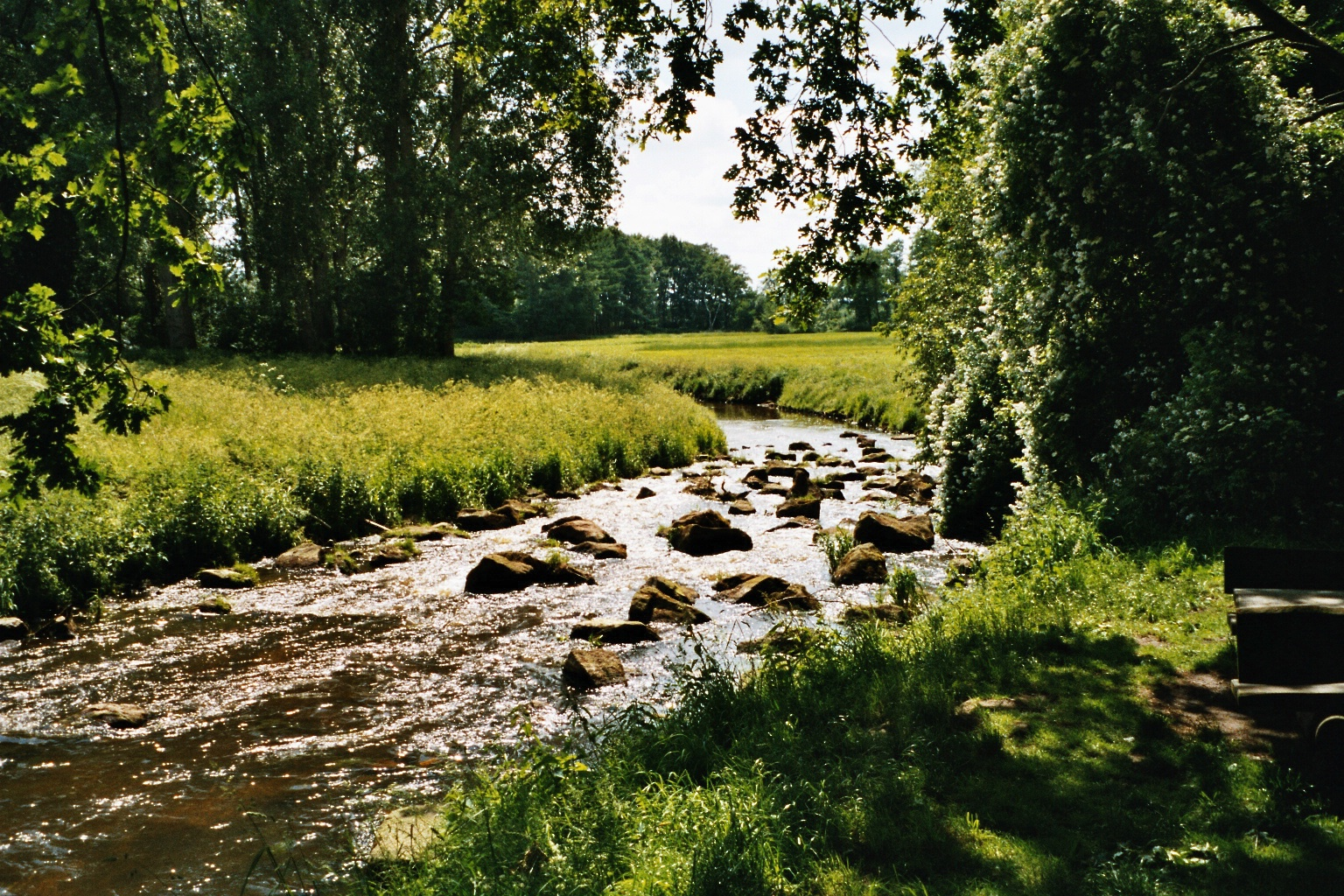

Location
- Country: Germany
- State: Lower Saxony

Physical characteristics
- Mouth
  - location: Hase
  - coordinates: 52.6903°N 7.3953°E
- Length: 38.5 km (23.9 mi)
- Basin size: 208 km^{2} (80 sq mi)

Basin features
- Progression: Hase→ Ems→ North Sea

Mittelradde is a river of Lower Saxony, Germany. It flows into the Hase west of Haselünne.

== See also ==
- List of rivers of Lower Saxony
