= Lohnder Bach =

River in Germany

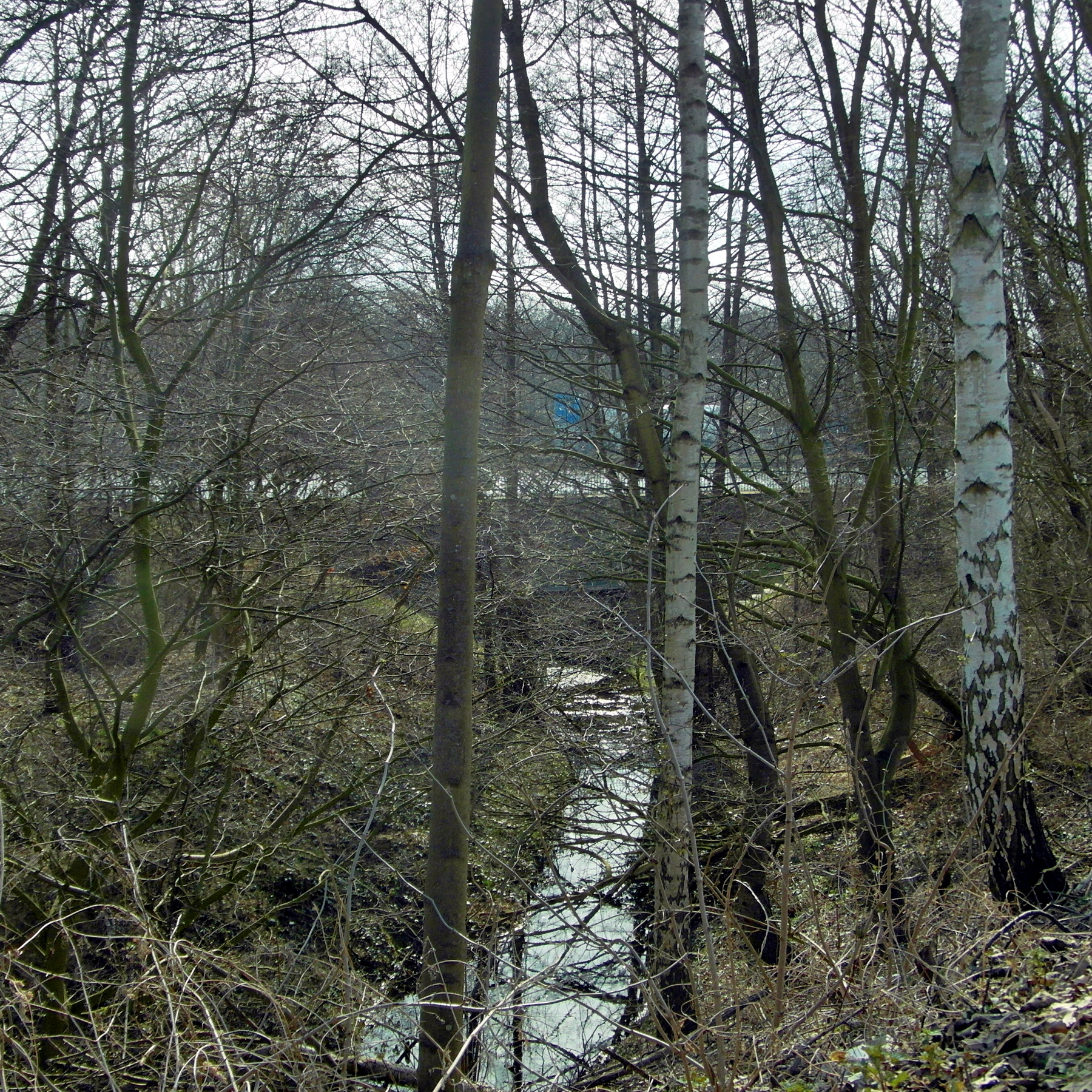

Location
- Country: Germany
- States: Lower Saxony

Physical characteristics
- Source
  - location: between Kirchwehren and Almhorst, Seelze
- Mouth
  - location: Leine
  - coordinates: 52.4050°N 9.5612°E
- Length: 7.3 km (4.5 mi)

Basin features
- Progression: Leine→ Aller→ Weser→ North Sea

Lohnder Bach is a small river, about 7.3 km (4.5 mi) long, in Lower Saxony, Germany. It rises between the Seelze districts of Kirchwehren and Almhorst and flows north through Lohnde into the Leine at the northern edge of the town.

In the northern part of the FFH area "Laubwälder südlich Seelze", the stream runs through stands of alder and ash. In April 2012 a section of the Lohnder Bach was re-routed and renatured by the Gewässer- und Landschaftspflegeverband Mittlere Leine.

== See also ==
- List of rivers of Lower Saxony
