= Nährenbach =

River in Germany

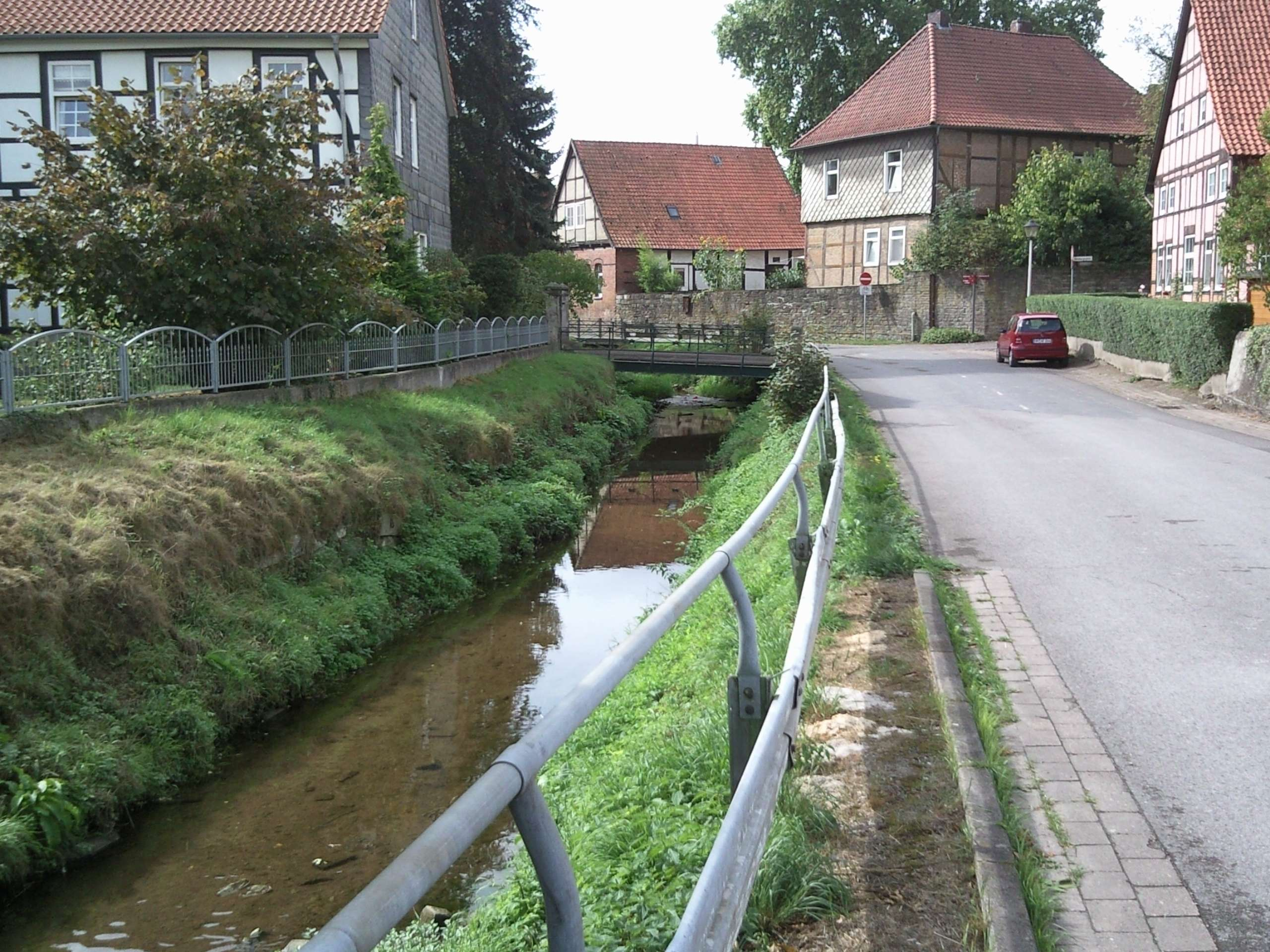

Location
- Country: Germany
- States: Lower Saxony

Physical characteristics
- Mouth
  - location: Weser
  - coordinates: 52°08′10″N 9°17′10″E

Basin features
- Progression: Weser→ North Sea

Nährenbach is a small river of Lower Saxony, Germany. It flows into the Weser near Fischbeck.

== See also ==
- List of rivers of Lower Saxony
