= Katenbäke =

River in Germany

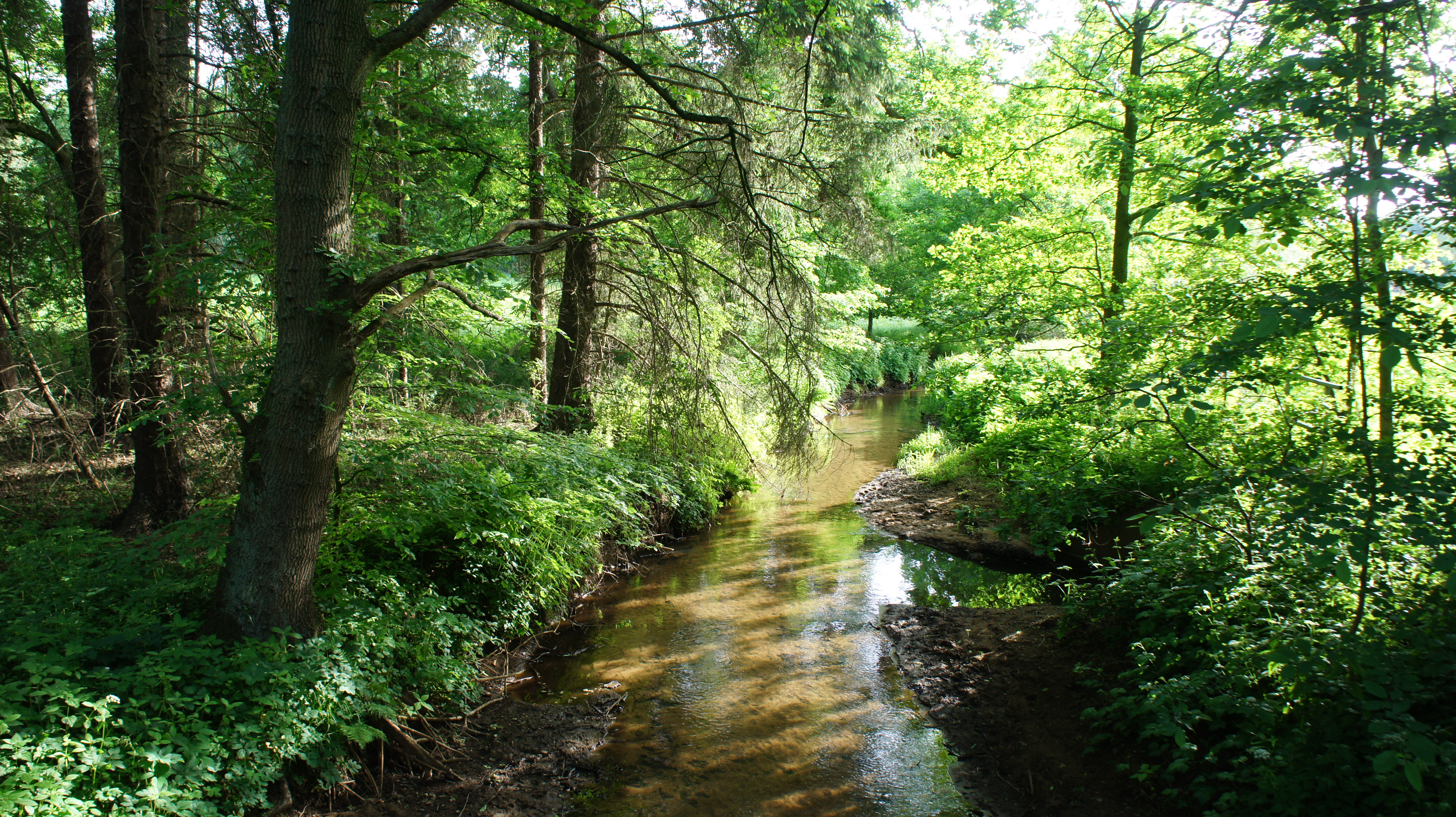

Location
- Country: Germany
- State: Lower Saxony

Physical characteristics
- Mouth
  - location: Hunte
  - coordinates: 52.8838°N 8.4559°E
- Length: 14.2 km (8.8 mi)

Basin features
- Progression: Hunte→ Weser→ North Sea

Katenbäke is a river of Lower Saxony, Germany. It flows into the Hunte near Wildeshausen.

== See also ==
- List of rivers of Lower Saxony
