= Drepte =

River in Germany

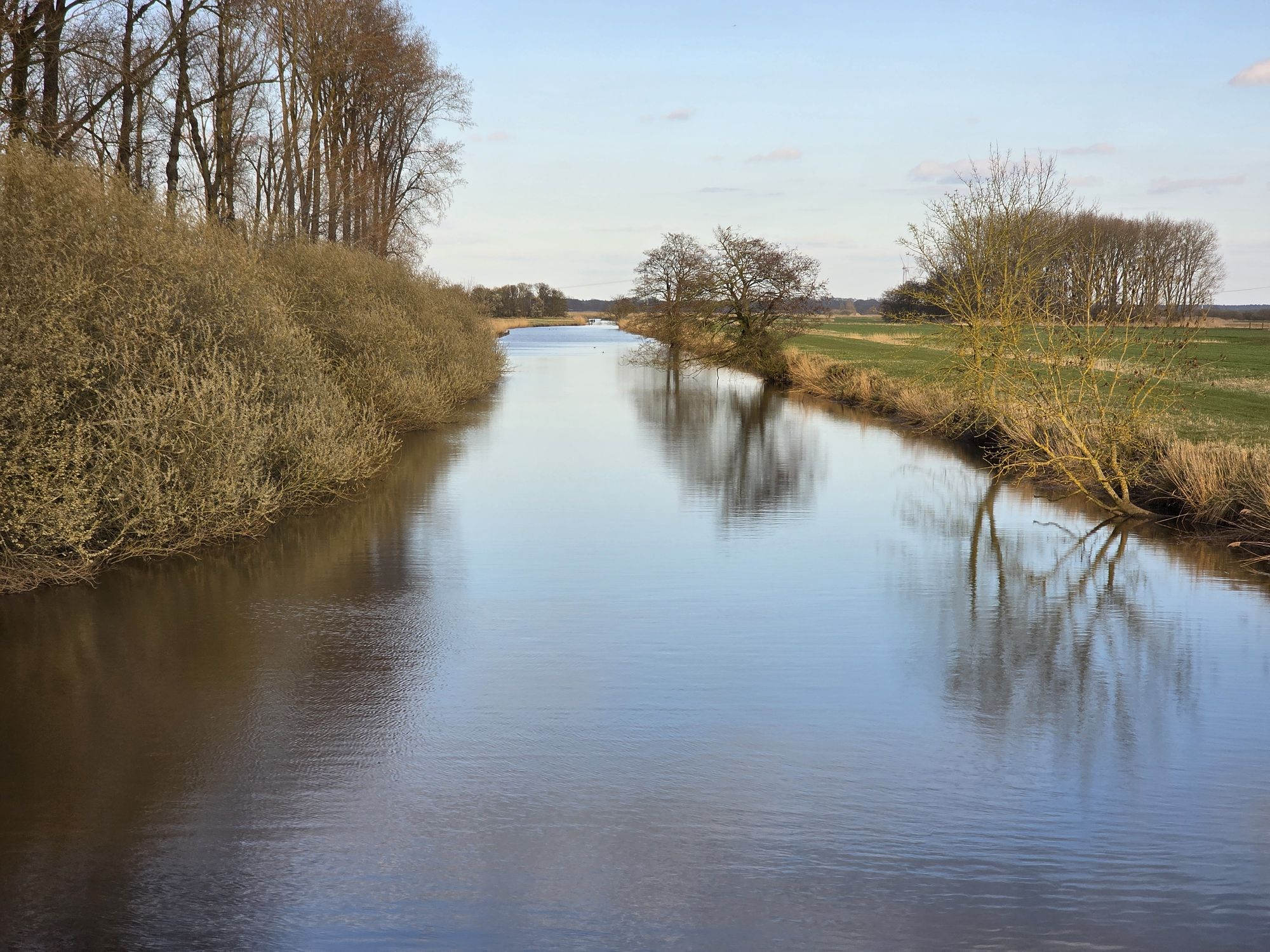

Location
- Country: Germany
- State: Lower Saxony

Physical characteristics
- Mouth
  - location: Weser
  - coordinates: 53.4038°N 8.5042°E
- Length: 37.6 km (23.4 mi)
- Basin size: 101 km^{2} (39 sq mi)

Basin features
- Progression: Weser→ North Sea

Drepte is a river of Lower Saxony, Germany. It flows into the Weser north of Brake.

== See also ==
- List of rivers of Lower Saxony
