= Blender Emte =

River in Germany

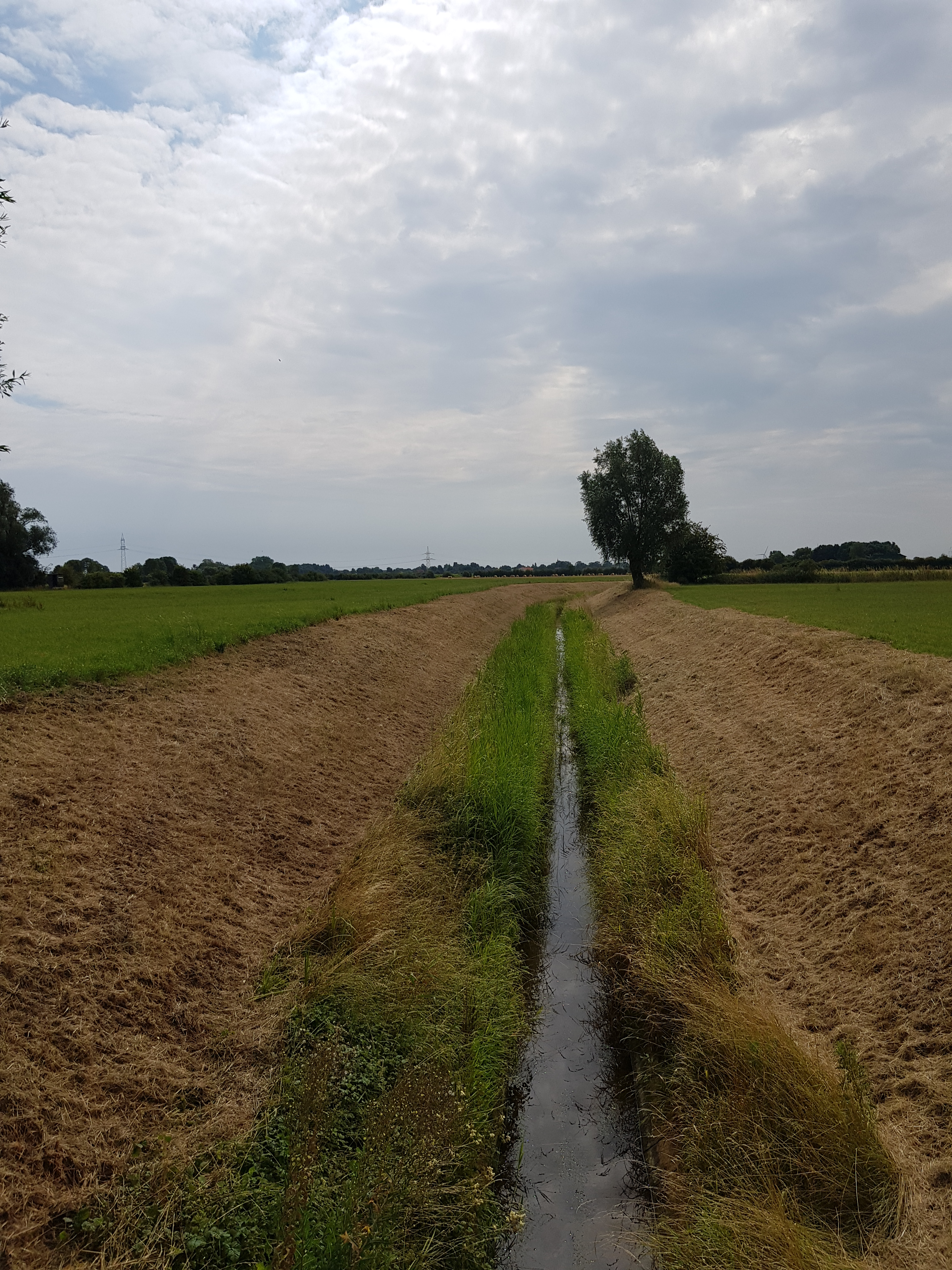

Location
- Country: Germany
- State: Lower Saxony

Physical characteristics
- Mouth
  - location: Weser
  - coordinates: 52.9634°N 9.1043°E
- Length: 15.2 km (9.4 mi)

Basin features
- Progression: Weser→ North Sea

Blender Emte is a river of Lower Saxony, Germany. It flows into the Weser near Blender.

== See also ==
- List of rivers of Lower Saxony
