= Braker Sieltief =

River in Germany

Location
- Country: Germany
- State: Lower Saxony

Physical characteristics
- Source
  - location: In the Süder-Frieschenmoor
  - coordinates: 53.3485°N 8.3818°E
- Mouth
  - location: In Brake into the Weser
  - coordinates: 53.3339°N 8.4900°E

Basin features
- Progression: Weser→ North Sea

Braker Sieltief is a river of Lower Saxony, Germany.

The Braker Sieltief springs in the Süder-Frieschenmoor. It is a left tributary of the Weser in Brake.

== See also ==
- List of rivers of Lower Saxony
