= Nette (Hase) =

River in Germany

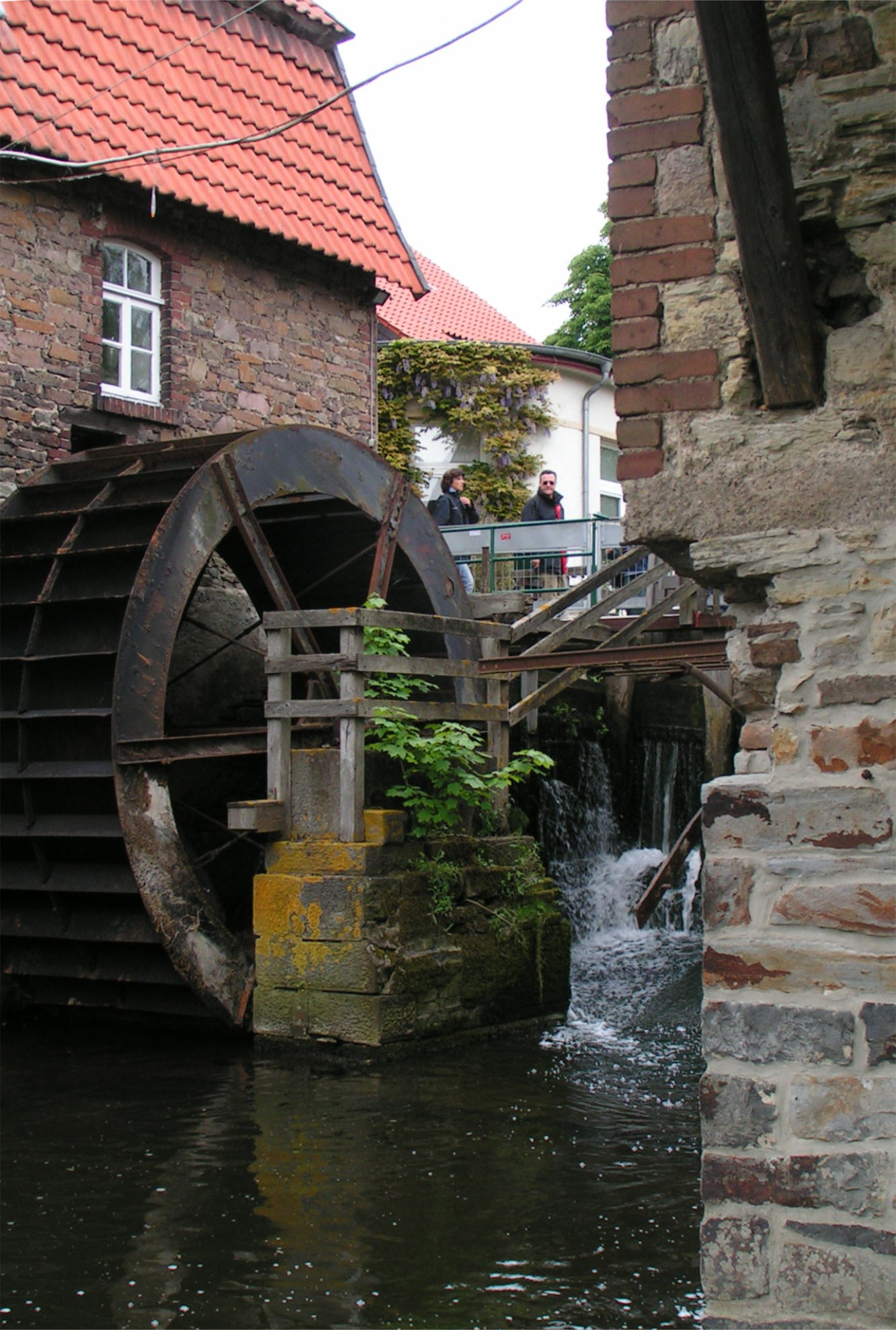

Location
- Country: Germany
- State: Lower Saxony

Physical characteristics
- Mouth
  - location: Hase
  - coordinates: 52.2939°N 8.0243°E
- Length: 19.5 km (12.1 mi)

Basin features
- Progression: Hase→ Ems→ North Sea

Nette (German pronunciation: [ˈnɛtə]) is a river of Lower Saxony, Germany. It is a tributary of the Hase northwest of Osnabrück.

== See also ==
- List of rivers of Lower Saxony
