= Burgdorfer Aue =

River in Germany

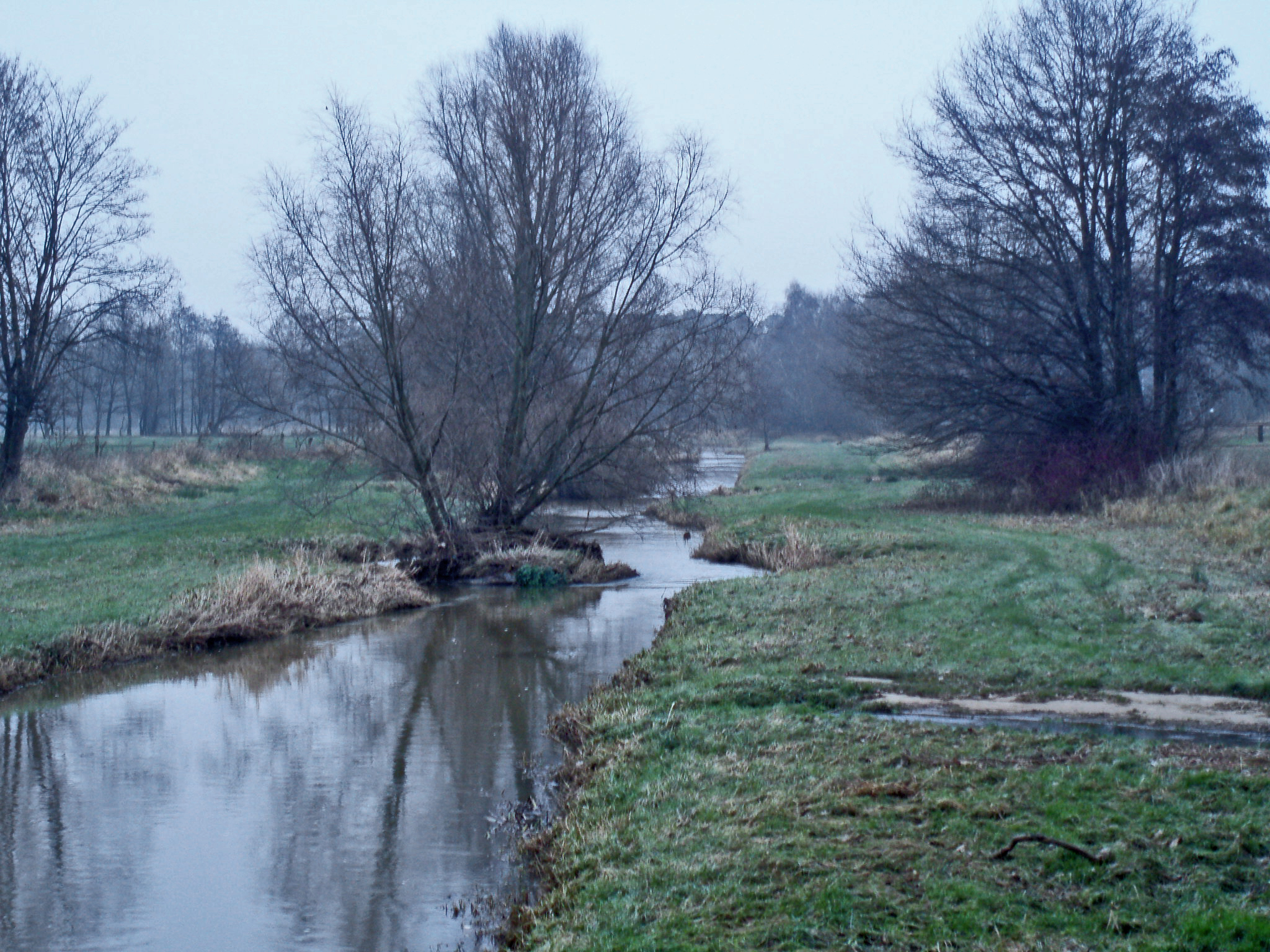

Location
- Country: Germany
- State: Lower Saxony

Physical characteristics
- Mouth
  - location: Fuhsekanal
  - coordinates: 52.5856°N 10.0517°E

Basin features
- Progression: Aller→ Weser→ North Sea

Burgdorfer Aue is a river of Lower Saxony, Germany. It discharges into the Fuhsekanal, which flows into the Aller west of Celle.

== See also ==
- List of rivers of Lower Saxony
