= Flumm =

River in Germany

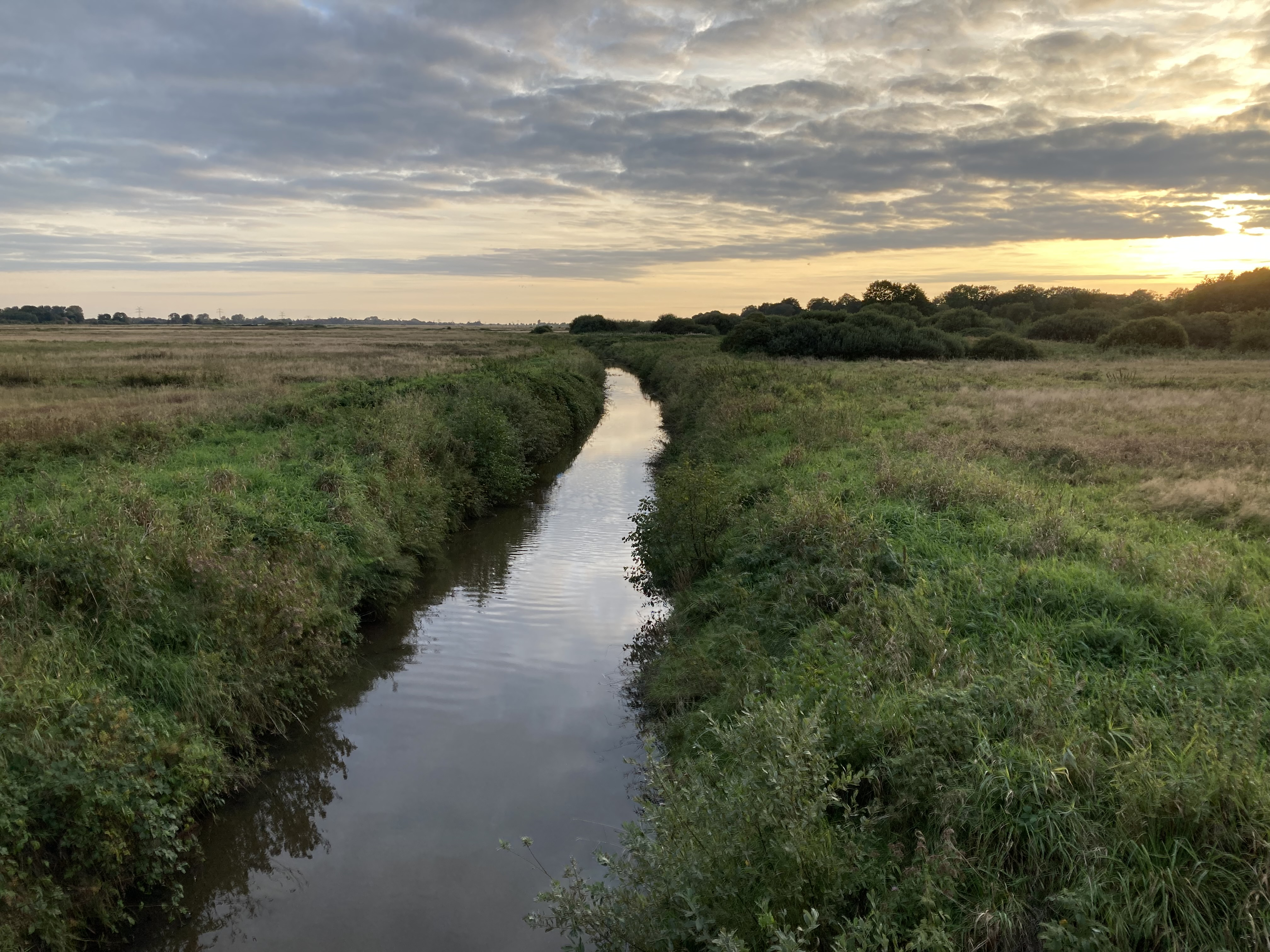

Location
- Country: Germany
- State: Lower Saxony

Physical characteristics
- Mouth
  - location: Sauteler Tief
  - coordinates: 53.4146°N 7.5723°E

Basin features
- Progression: Sauteler Tief→ Ems→ North Sea

Flumm is a small river of Lower Saxony, Germany. It flows into the Ems (river) via the Sauteler Kanal, situated east of Emden.

== See also ==
- List of rivers of Lower Saxony
