= Bever (Oste) =

River in Germany

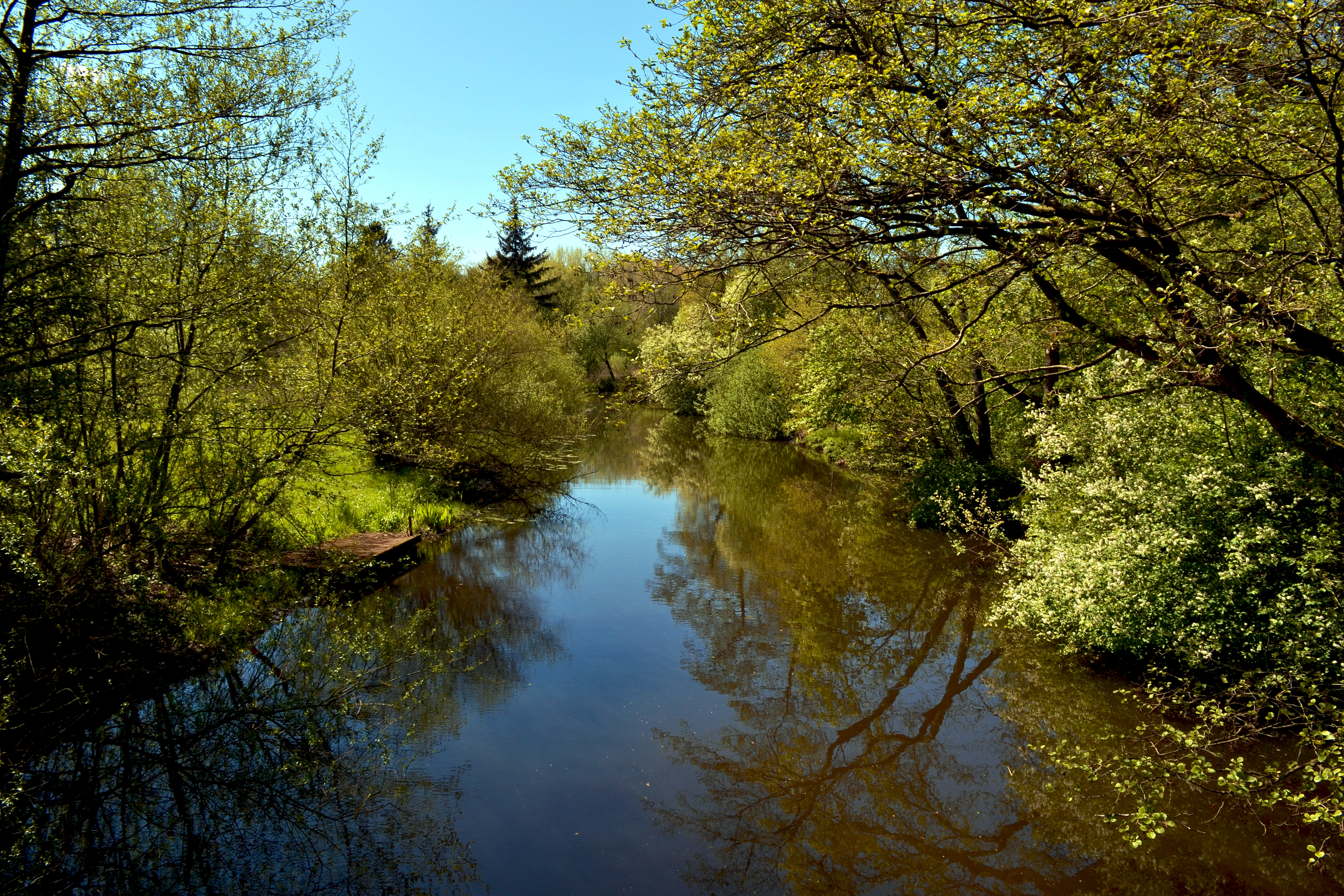

Location
- Country: Germany
- State: Lower Saxony

Physical characteristics
- Mouth
  - location: Oste
  - coordinates: 53.4708°N 9.1418°E
- Basin size: 160 km^{2} (62 sq mi)

Basin features
- Progression: Oste→ Elbe→ North Sea

Bever (German pronunciation: [ˈbeːvɐ]) is a river of Lower Saxony, Germany. It flows into the Oste south of Bremervörde.

== See also ==
- List of rivers of Lower Saxony
