= Purrmühlenbach =

River in Germany

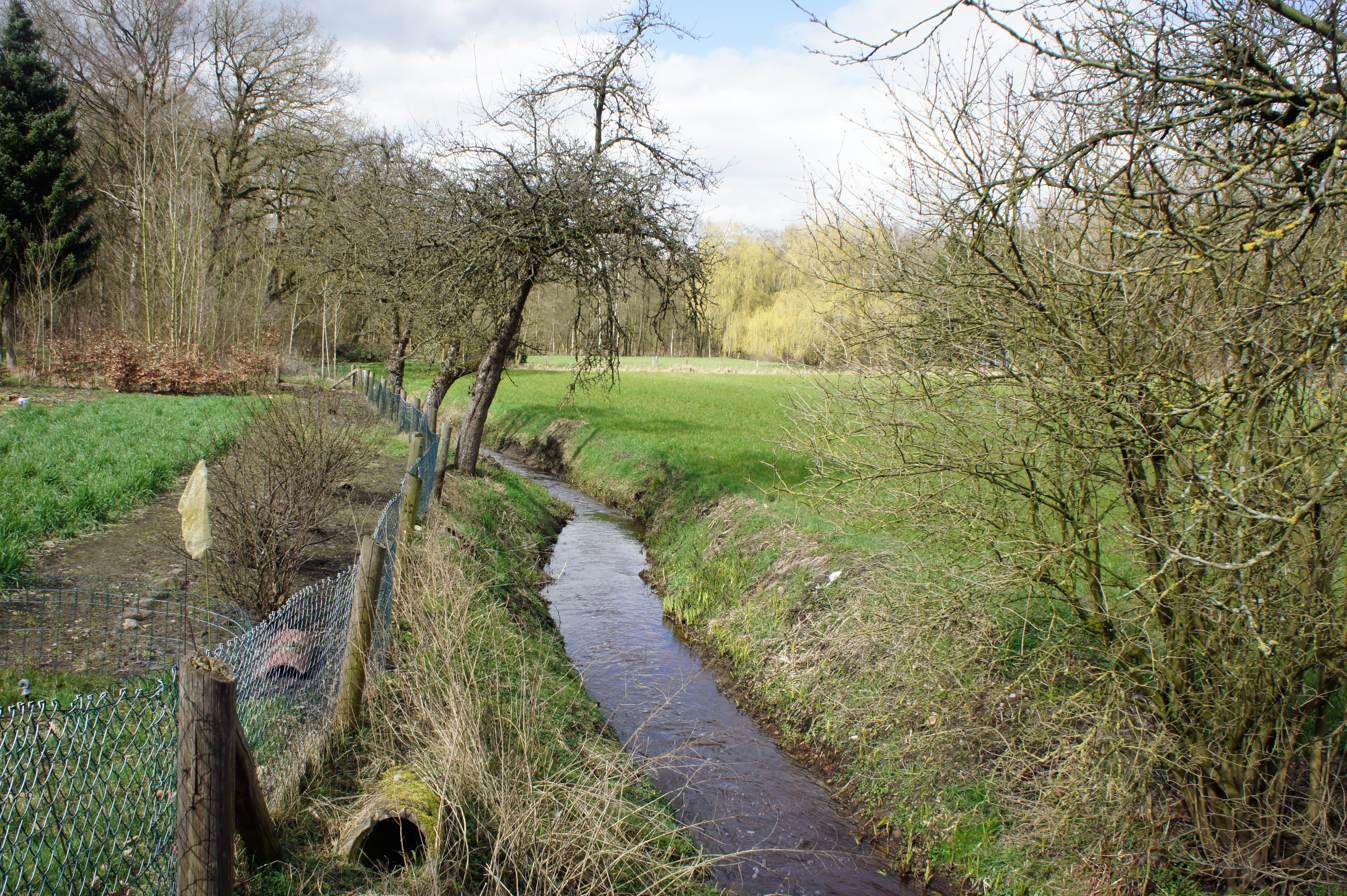

Location
- Country: Germany
- States: Lower Saxony

Physical characteristics
- Mouth
  - location: Delme
  - coordinates: 52°53′58″N 8°35′50″E

Basin features
- Progression: Delme→ Ochtum→ Weser→ North Sea

Purrmühlenbach is a small river of Lower Saxony, Germany. It flows into the Delme in Harpstedt.

== See also ==
- List of rivers of Lower Saxony
