= Schweiburg =

River in Germany

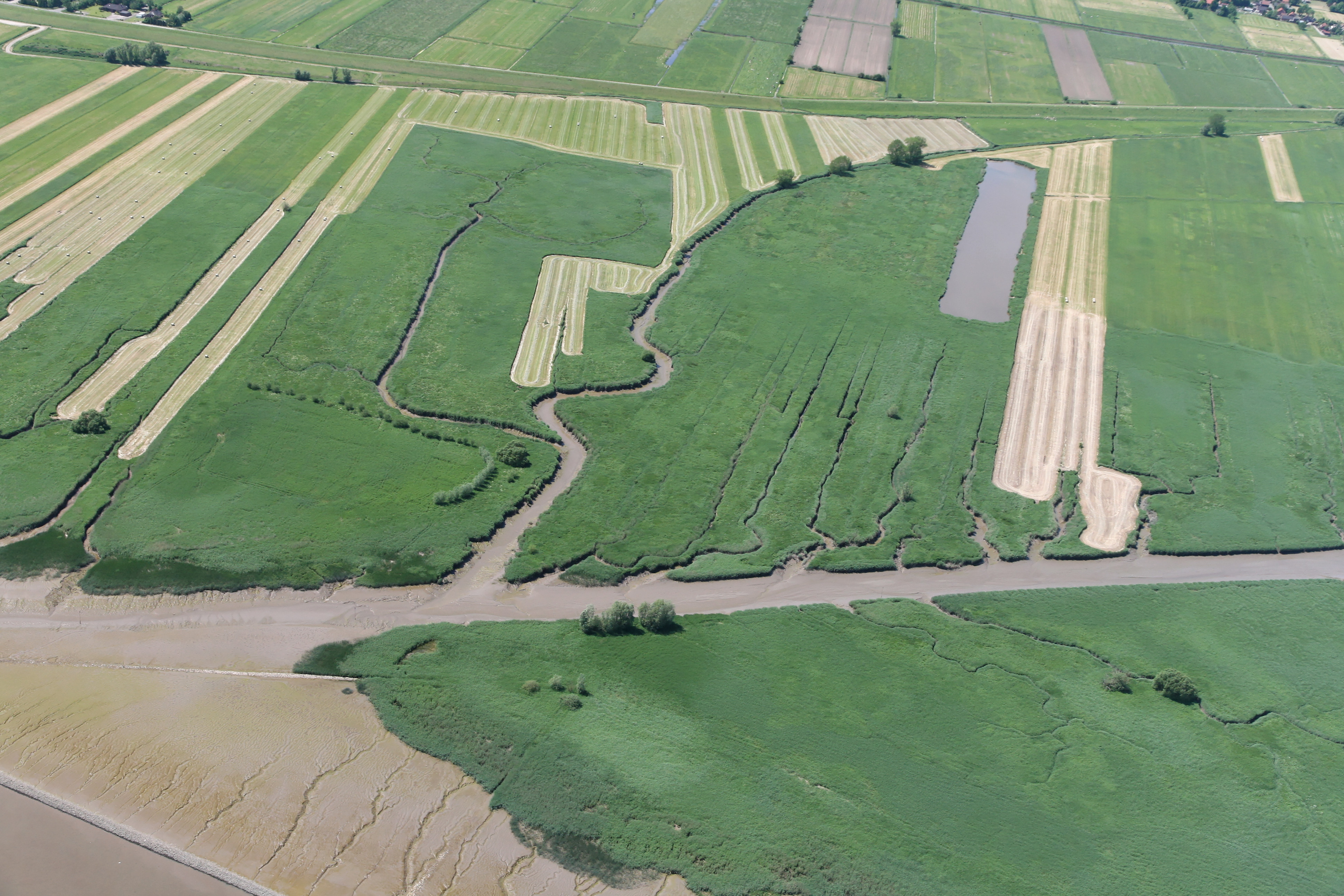
- Aerial view: the Schweiburg (horizontally from the left to the right) branching of the Weser (in the lower left corner)

Location
- Country: Germany
- State: Lower Saxony

Physical characteristics
- Source
  - location: Weser
  - coordinates: 53.3672°N 8.4932°E
- Mouth
  - location: Weser
  - coordinates: 53.4192°N 8.4833°E

Schweiburg is a branch of the river Weser near Rodenkirchen (a division of Stadland) in Lower Saxony, Germany.

== See also ==
- List of rivers of Lower Saxony
