= Dünsener Bach =

River in Germany

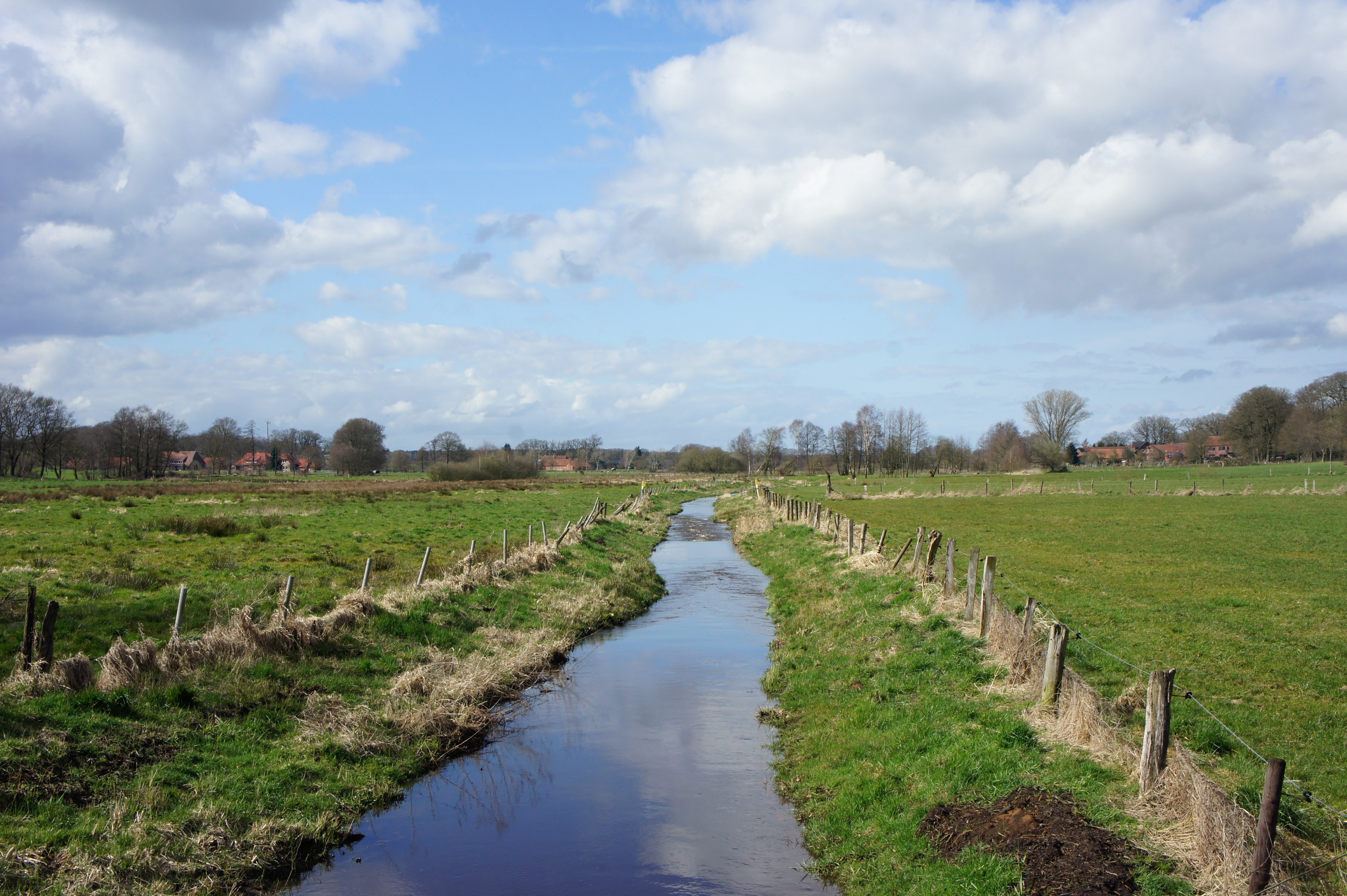

Location
- Country: Germany
- State: Lower Saxony

Physical characteristics
- Mouth
  - location: Varreler Bäke
  - coordinates: 53.0419°N 8.7060°E
- Length: 33.5 km (20.8 mi)
- Basin size: 77 km^{2} (30 sq mi)

Basin features
- Progression: Varreler Bäke→ Ochtum→ Weser→ North Sea

Dünsener Bach (in its lower course: Pultern) is a river of Lower Saxony, Germany. It flows into the Varreler Bäke east of Delmenhorst.

== See also ==
- List of rivers of Lower Saxony
