= Ramme (river) =

River in Germany

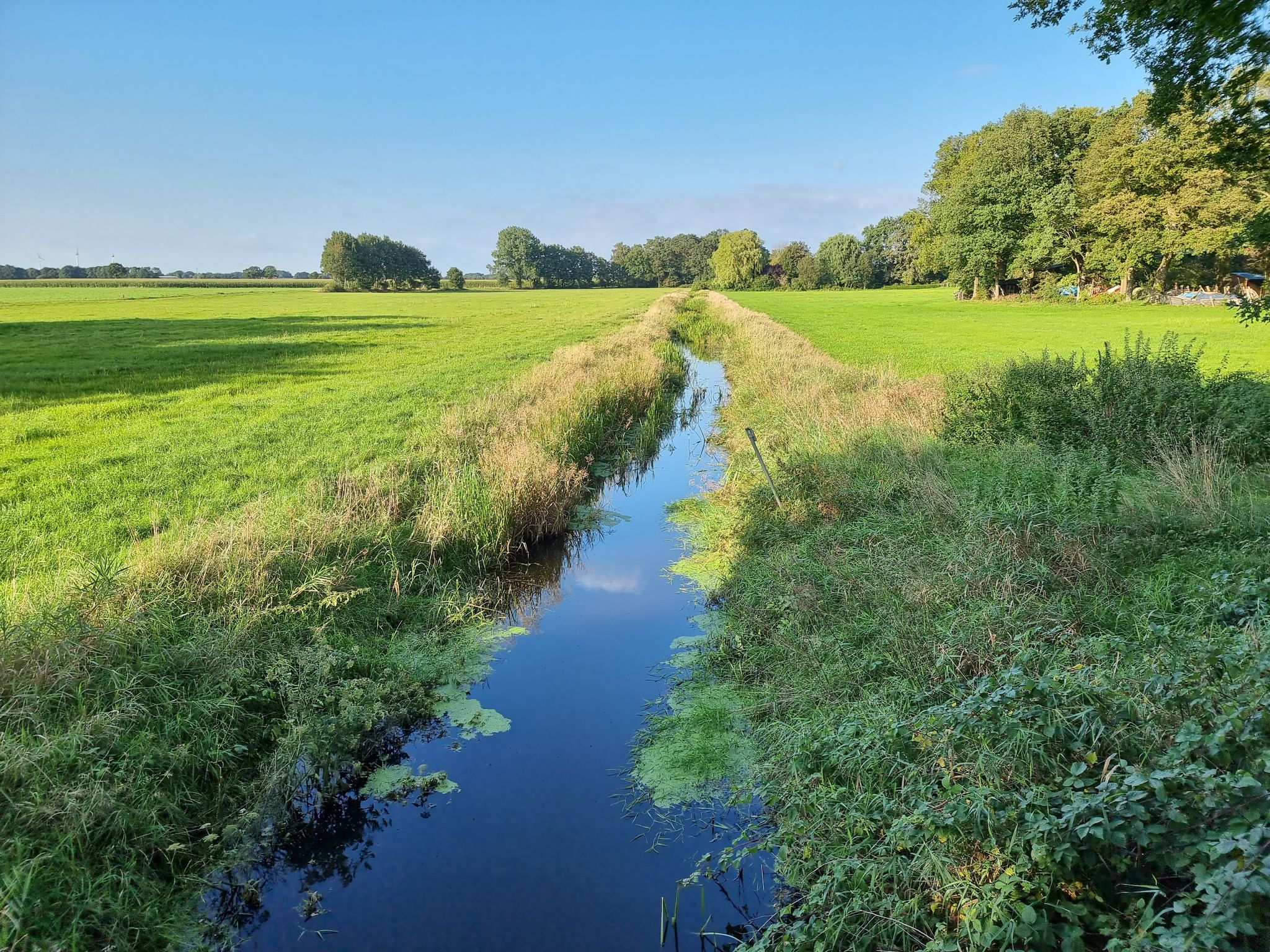

Location
- Country: Germany
- State: Lower Saxony

Physical characteristics
- Mouth
  - location: Oste
  - coordinates: 53.2765°N 9.4727°E
- Length: 18.3 km (11.4 mi)

Basin features
- Progression: Oste→ Elbe→ North Sea

Ramme is a river of Lower Saxony, Germany. It flows into the Oste in Sittensen.

== See also ==
- List of rivers of Lower Saxony
