= Gehle =

River in Germany

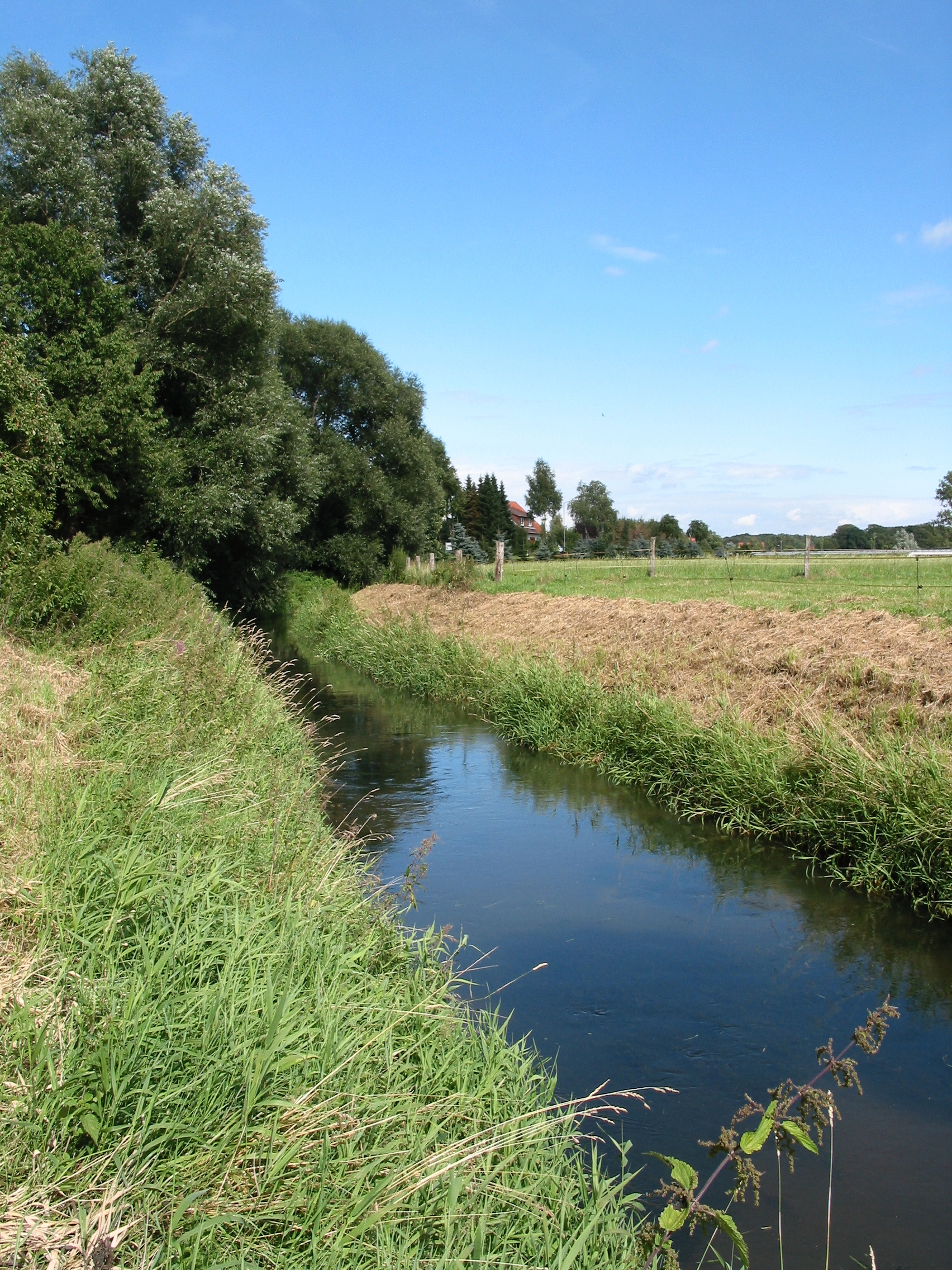

Location
- Country: Germany
- States: Lower Saxony and North Rhine-Westphalia

Physical characteristics
- Mouth
  - location: Weser
  - coordinates: 52.4592°N 9.0216°E
- Length: 27.0 km (16.8 mi)

Basin features
- Progression: Weser→ North Sea

Gehle is a river of Lower Saxony and North Rhine-Westphalia, Germany. It flows into the Weser north of Petershagen.

== See also ==
- List of rivers of Lower Saxony
