= Dramme =

River in Germany

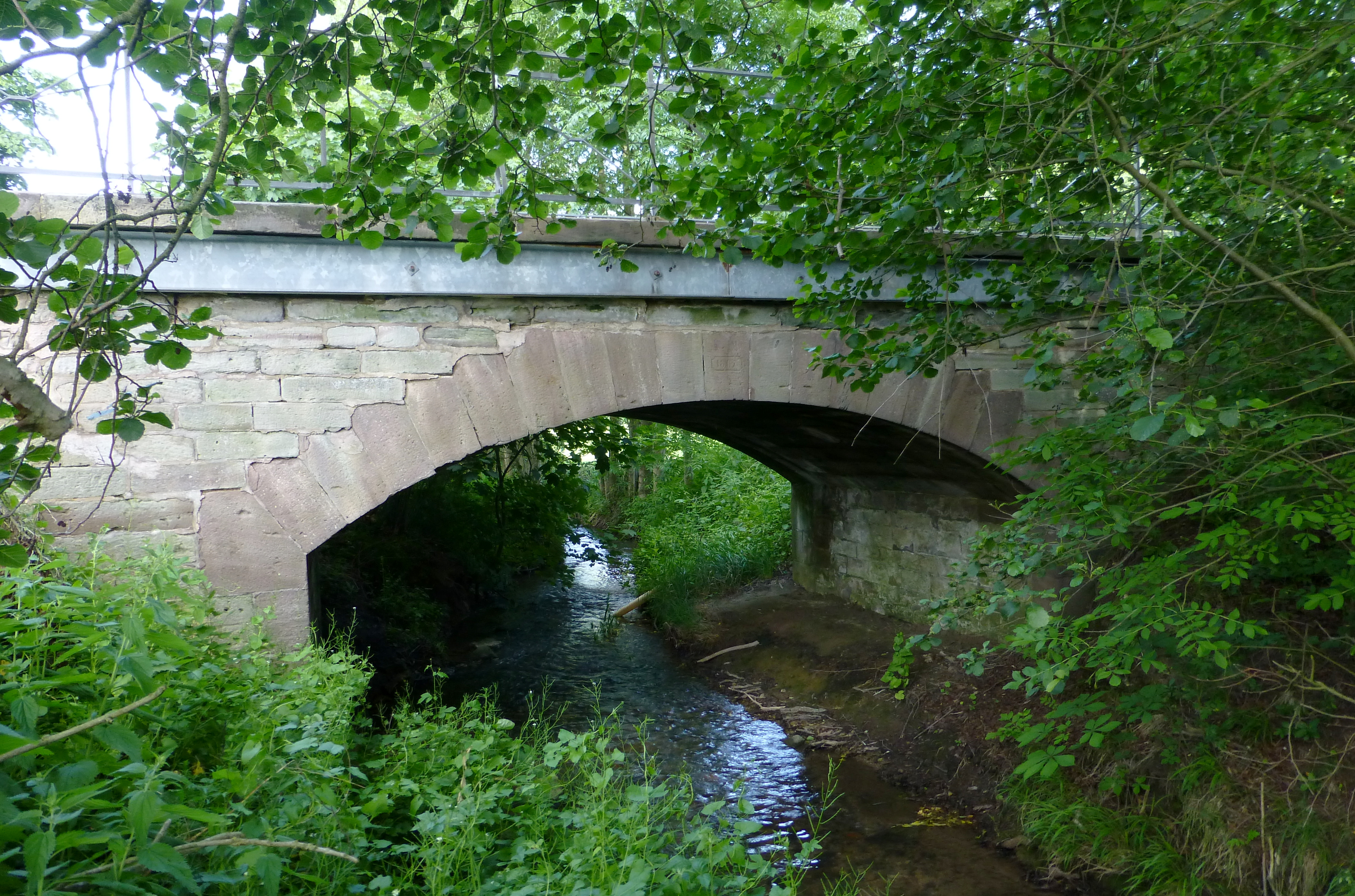

Location
- Country: Germany
- State: Lower Saxony

Physical characteristics
- Mouth
  - location: Leine
  - coordinates: 51.4682°N 9.9236°E
- Length: 14.3 km (8.9 mi)

Basin features
- Progression: Leine→ Aller→ Weser→ North Sea

Dramme is a river of Lower Saxony, Germany. It flows into the Leine south of Göttingen.

== See also ==
- List of rivers of Lower Saxony
