= Annenriede =

River in Germany

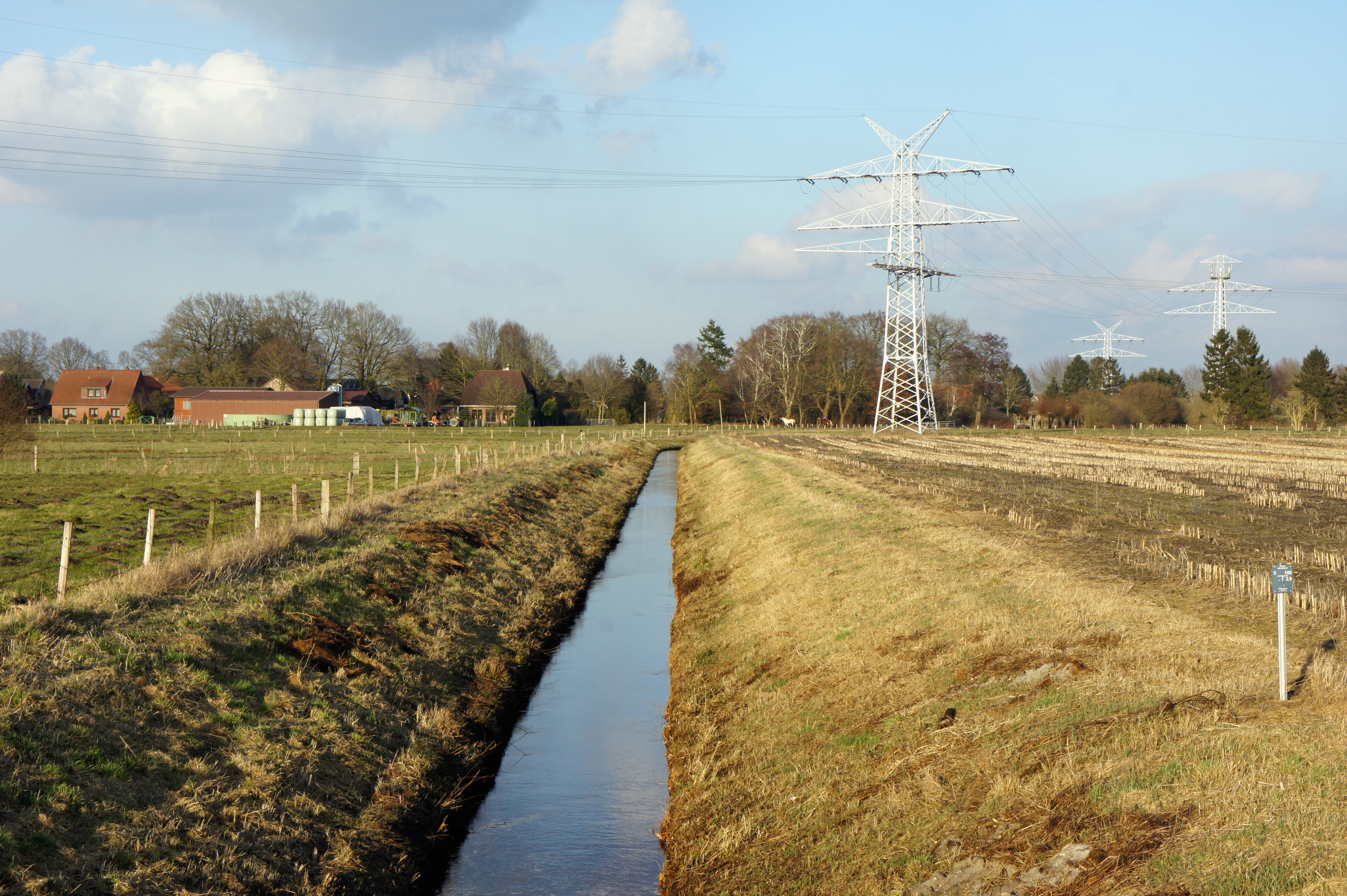

- Location of mouth in Lower Saxony

Location
- Country: Germany
- State: Lower Saxony

Physical characteristics
- Mouth
  - location: Delme
  - coordinates: 53°4′12″N 8°39′13″E
- Length: 25.5 km (15.8 mi)
- Basin size: 42 km^{2} (16 sq mi)

Basin features
- Progression: Delme→ Ochtum→ Weser→ North Sea

Annenriede (also: Annengraben, in its lower course: Heidkruger Bäke) is a river of Lower Saxony, Germany. It flows into the Delme near Delmenhorst.

== See also ==
- List of rivers of Lower Saxony
