= Heiligenloher Beeke =

River in Germany

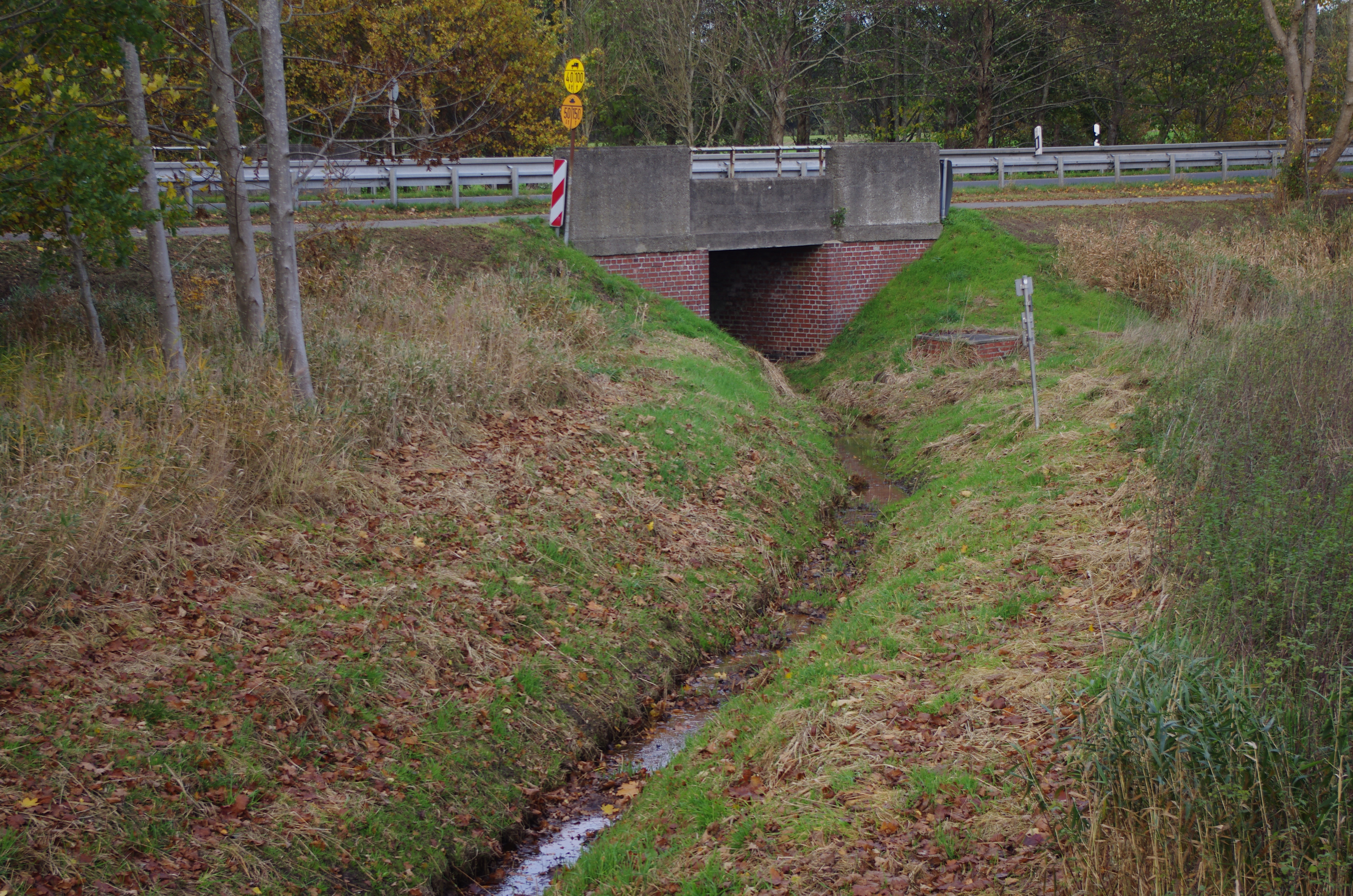

Location
- Country: Germany
- States: Lower Saxony

Physical characteristics
- Mouth
  - location: Hunte
  - coordinates: 52.7716°N 8.4639°E

Basin features
- Progression: Hunte→ Weser→ North Sea

Heiligenloher Beeke is a river of Lower Saxony, Germany. It flows into the Hunte near Goldenstedt. Heiligenloher Beeke Und Angrenzende Bachniederungen is in Germany, has been designated as Landschaftschutzgebiet at National level in 1996. It covers 2.93 km^{2}.

== See also ==
- List of rivers of Lower Saxony
