= Auschnippe =

River in Germany

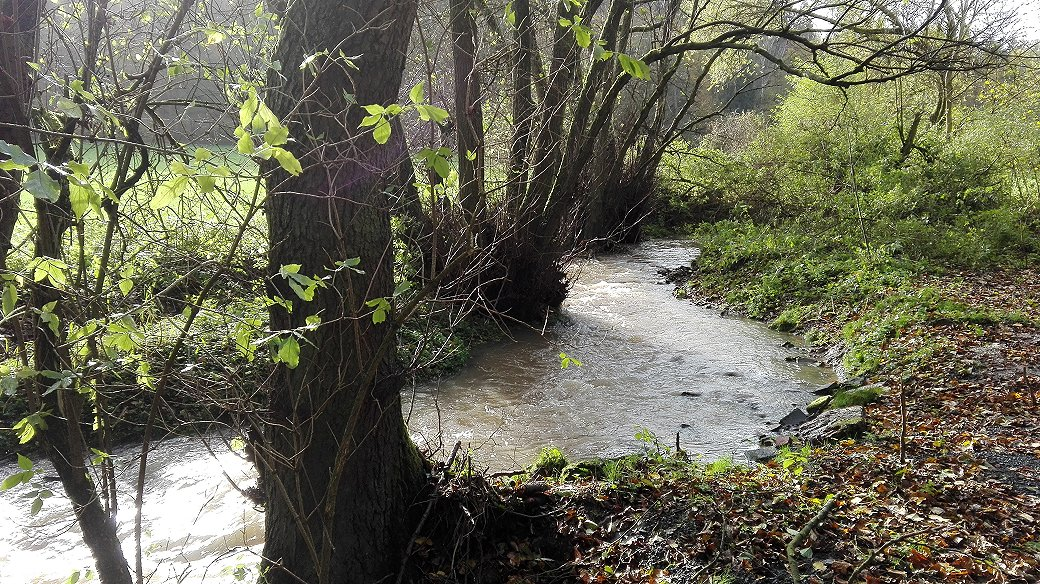

- Location of mouth in Lower Saxony

Location
- Country: Germany
- State: Lower Saxony

Physical characteristics
- Mouth
  - location: Schwülme
  - coordinates: 51.5719°N 9.7141°E
- Length: 14.5 km (9.0 mi)

Basin features
- Progression: Schwülme→ Weser→ North Sea

Auschnippe (German for 'cut out') is a river of Lower Saxony, Germany. It flows on the west side of Adelebsen before following through Dransfeld and then into the Schwülme.

== See also ==
- List of rivers of Lower Saxony
