= Wapel (Jade) =

River in Germany

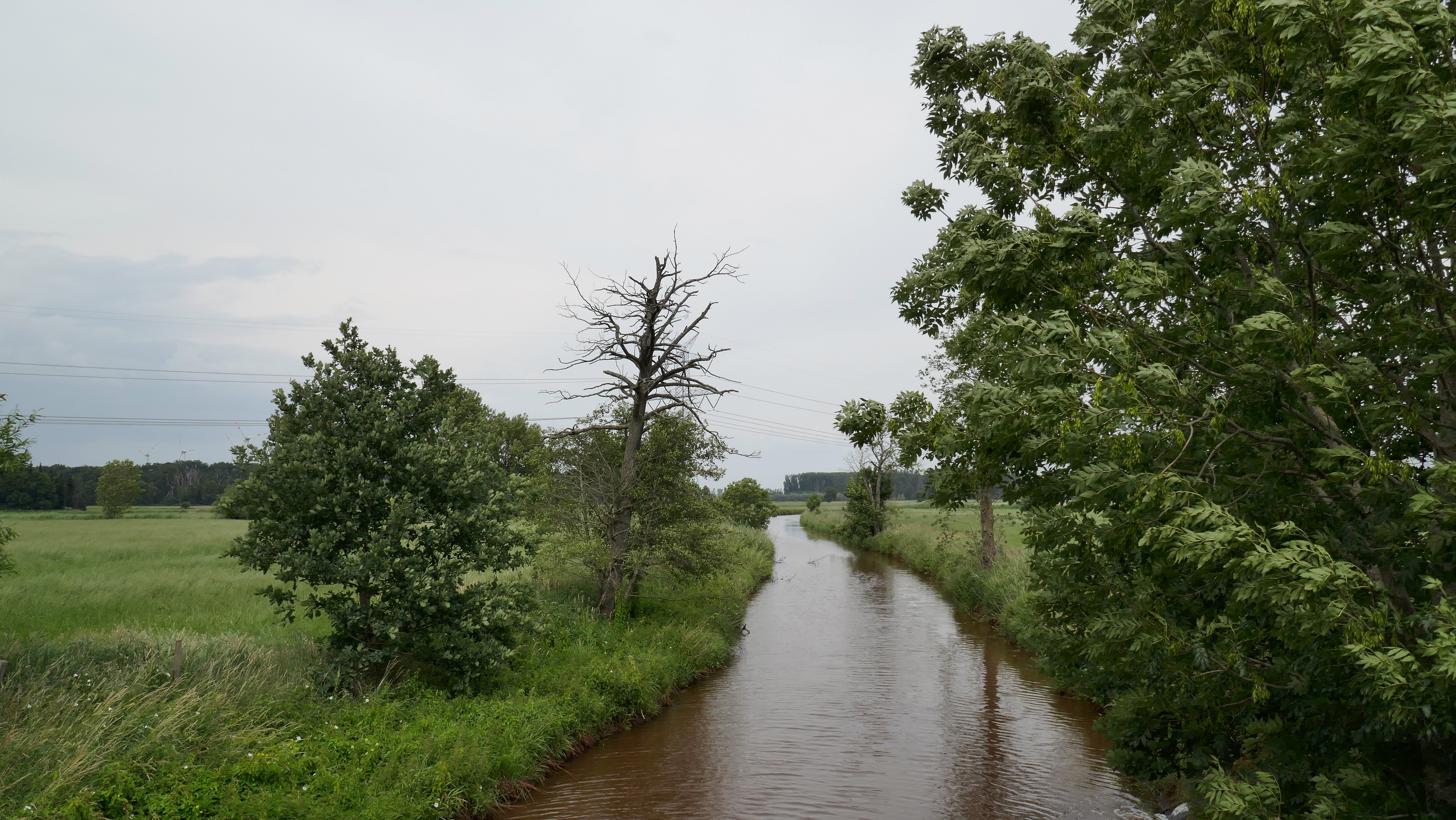

Location
- Country: Germany
- State: Lower Saxony

Physical characteristics
- Mouth
  - location: Jade
  - coordinates: 53.3686°N 8.2038°E
- Length: 15.1 km (9.4 mi)

Basin features
- Progression: Jade→ North Sea

Wapel is a river of Lower Saxony, Germany. It flows into the Jade southeast of Varel.

== See also ==
- List of rivers of Lower Saxony
