= Twiste (Oste) =

River in Germany

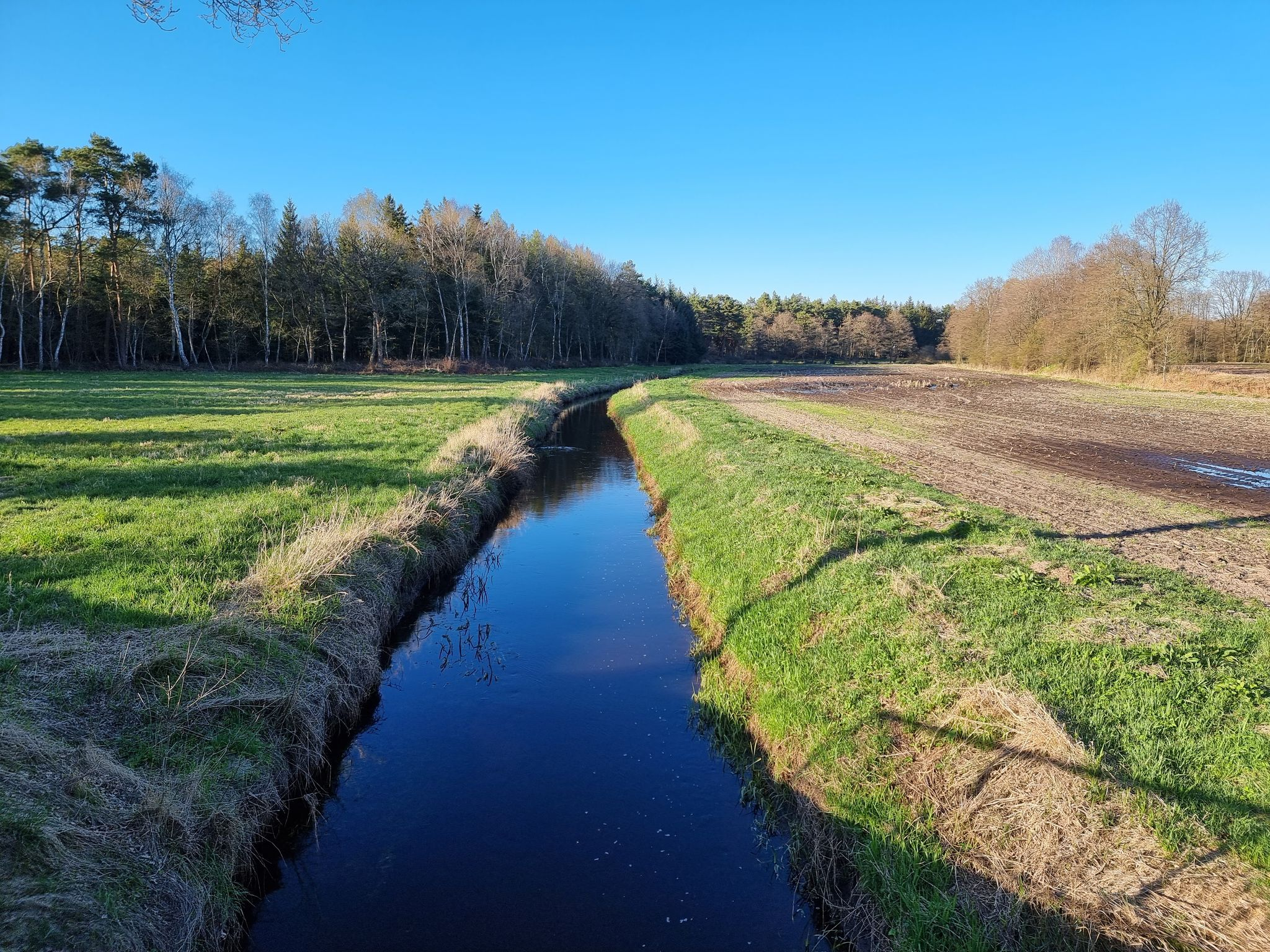

Location
- Country: Germany
- State: Lower Saxony

Physical characteristics
- Mouth
  - location: Oste
  - coordinates: 53.3259°N 9.2492°E
- Length: 14.2 km (8.8 mi)

Basin features
- Progression: Oste→ Elbe→ North Sea

Twiste (German pronunciation: [ˈtvɪstə]) is a river of Lower Saxony, Germany. It flows into the Oste near Zeven.

== See also ==
- List of rivers of Lower Saxony
