= Hasenburger Mühlenbach =

River in Germany

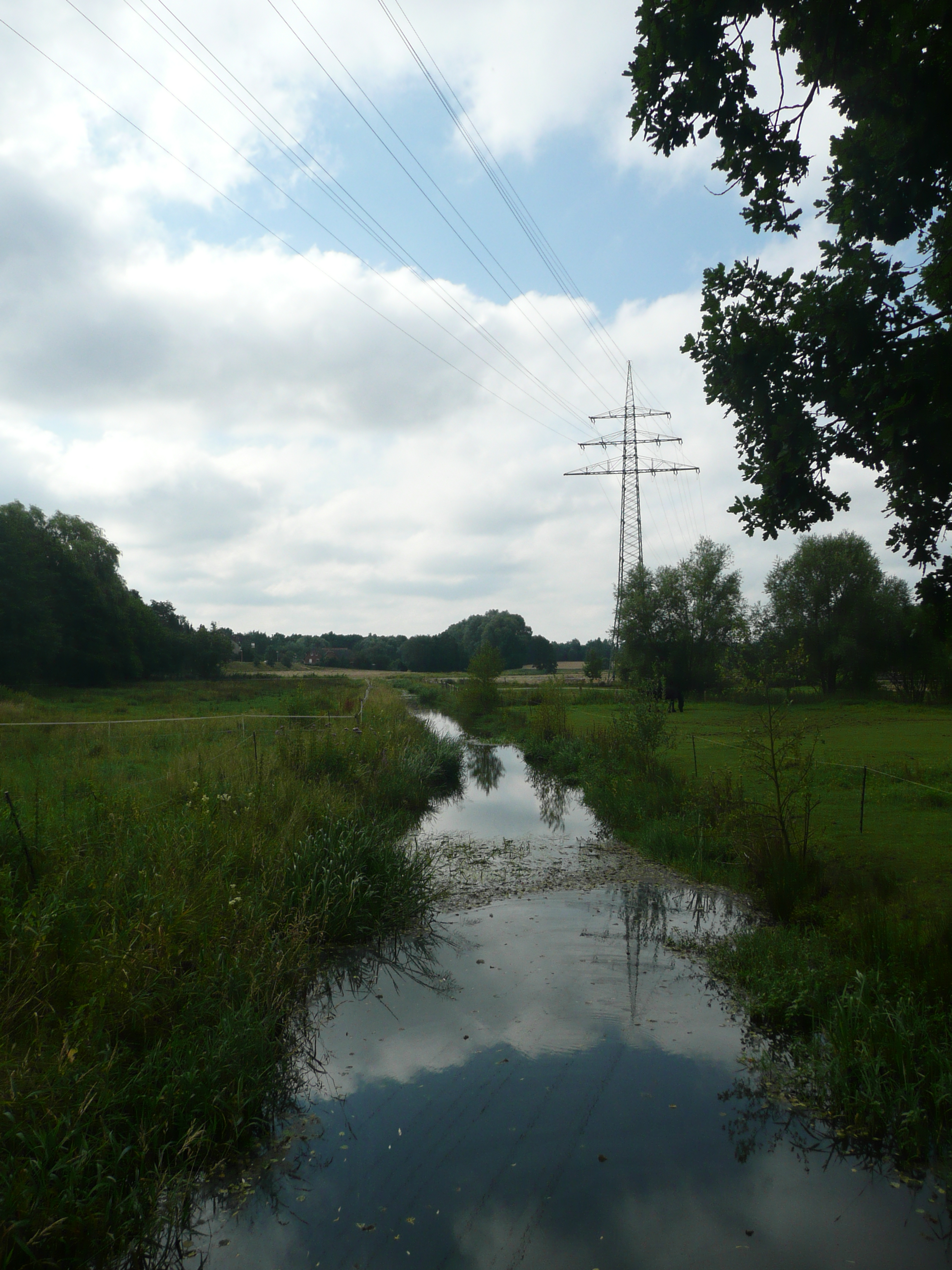
- Hasenburger Mühlenbach seen from the district Oedeme of Lüneburg

Location
- Country: Germany
- State: Lower Saxony

Physical characteristics
- Mouth
  - location: Ilmenau
  - coordinates: 53.2116°N 10.4138°E
- Length: 13.6 km (8.5 mi)

Basin features
- Progression: Ilmenau→ Elbe→ North Sea

Hasenburger Mühlenbach (also: Hasenburgerbach) is a river of Lower Saxony, Germany. It flows into the Ilmenau near Lüneburg.
