= Bevensen =

- Samtgemeinde
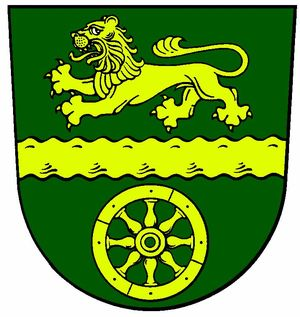
- Coat of arms
- Interactive map of Bevensen
- Location within Germany Location within Lower Saxony
- Coordinates: 53°04′43″N 10°34′41″E
- Country: Germany
- State: Lower Saxony
- District: Uelzen
- Disbanded: 1 November 2011
- Subdivisions: 8 municipalities

Area
  - Total: 226.66 km^{2} (87.51 sq mi)
- Elevation: 33 m (108 ft)

Population (2010-12-31)
  - Total: 16,050
  - Density: 70.81/km^{2} (183.4/sq mi)
- Time zone: UTC+01:00 (CET)
  - Summer (DST): UTC+02:00 (CEST)
- Postal codes: 29549
- Dialling codes: 05821
- Vehicle registration: UE
- Website: bad-bevensen.de

Bevensen is a former Samtgemeinde ("collective municipality") in the district of Uelzen, in Lower Saxony, Germany. Its seat was in the town Bad Bevensen. At the 1 November 2011 local government reform, the Samtgemeinden Bevensen and Altes Amt Ebstorf merged to form the new Samtgemeinde Bevensen-Ebstorf.

== Geography ==
=== Municipalities ===
The Bevensen Samtgemeinde consisted of the following eight municipalities:

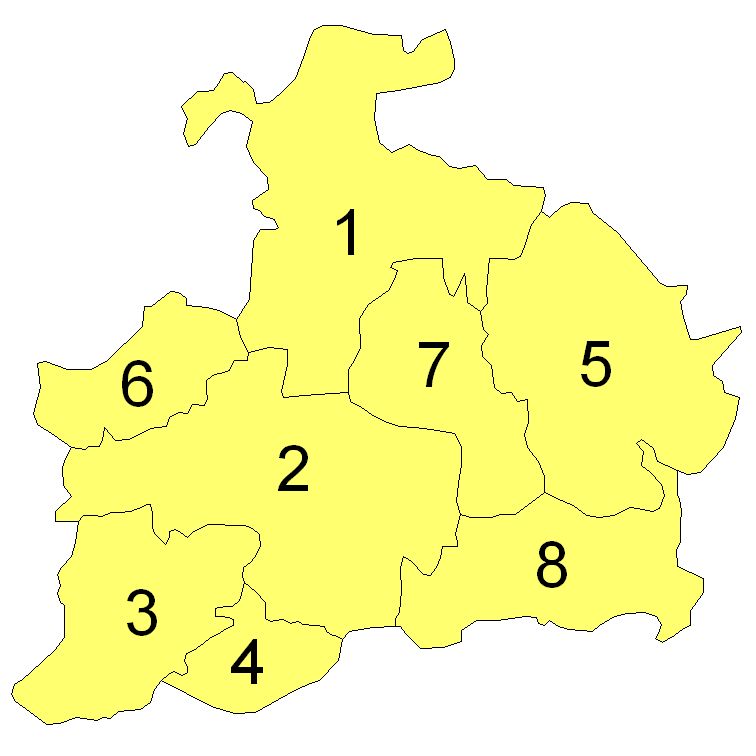

1. Altenmedingen
2. Bad Bevensen, town
3. Barum
4. Emmendorf
5. Himbergen
6. Jelmstorf
7. Römstedt
8. Weste

The villages in the eight municipalities:

- Gemeinde Altenmedingen
  - Aljarn
  - Altenmedingen
  - Bohndorf
  - Bostelwiebeck
  - Eddelstorf
  - Haaßel
  - Reisenmoor
  - Secklendorf
  - Vorwerk
- Town of Bad Bevensen
  - Bad Bevensen
  - Gollern
  - Groß Hesebeck
  - Jastorf
  - Klein Bünstorf
  - Klein Hesebeck
  - Medingen
  - Röbbel
  - Sasendorf
  - Seedorf
- Gemeinde Barum
  - Barum
  - Tätendorf-Eppensen
  - Gut Hoystorf
- Gemeinde Emmendorf
  - Emmendorf
  - Heitbrack
  - Nassennottorf
  - Walmstorf
- Gemeinde Himbergen
  - Almstorf
  - Brockhimbergen
  - Groß Thondorf
  - Himbergen
  - Hohenfier
  - Kettelstorf
  - Klein Thondorf
  - Kollendorf
  - Rohrstorf
  - Strothe
- Gemeinde Jelmstorf
  - Addenstorf
  - Bruchtorf
  - Jelmstorf
- Gemeinde Römstedt
  - Drögennottorf
  - Havekost
  - Masbrock
  - Niendorf I
  - Römstedt
- Gemeinde Weste
  - Hagen
  - Höver
  - Oetzendorf
  - Schlagte
  - Testorf
  - Weste

== Politics ==
=== Municipal council ===
After the local elections of 10 September 2006 the municipal council was made up as follows:

- CDU: 13 seats
- SPD: 11 seats
- Greens: 3 seats
- Bad Bevensen independents: 3 seats
- FDP: 2 Sitze

The mayor also had a seat and a vote.

== Notable residents ==
- Josef Oberhauser (1915–1979), German Nazi SS concentration camp commandant and Holocaust perpetrator
