= Schwienau (river) =

River in Germany

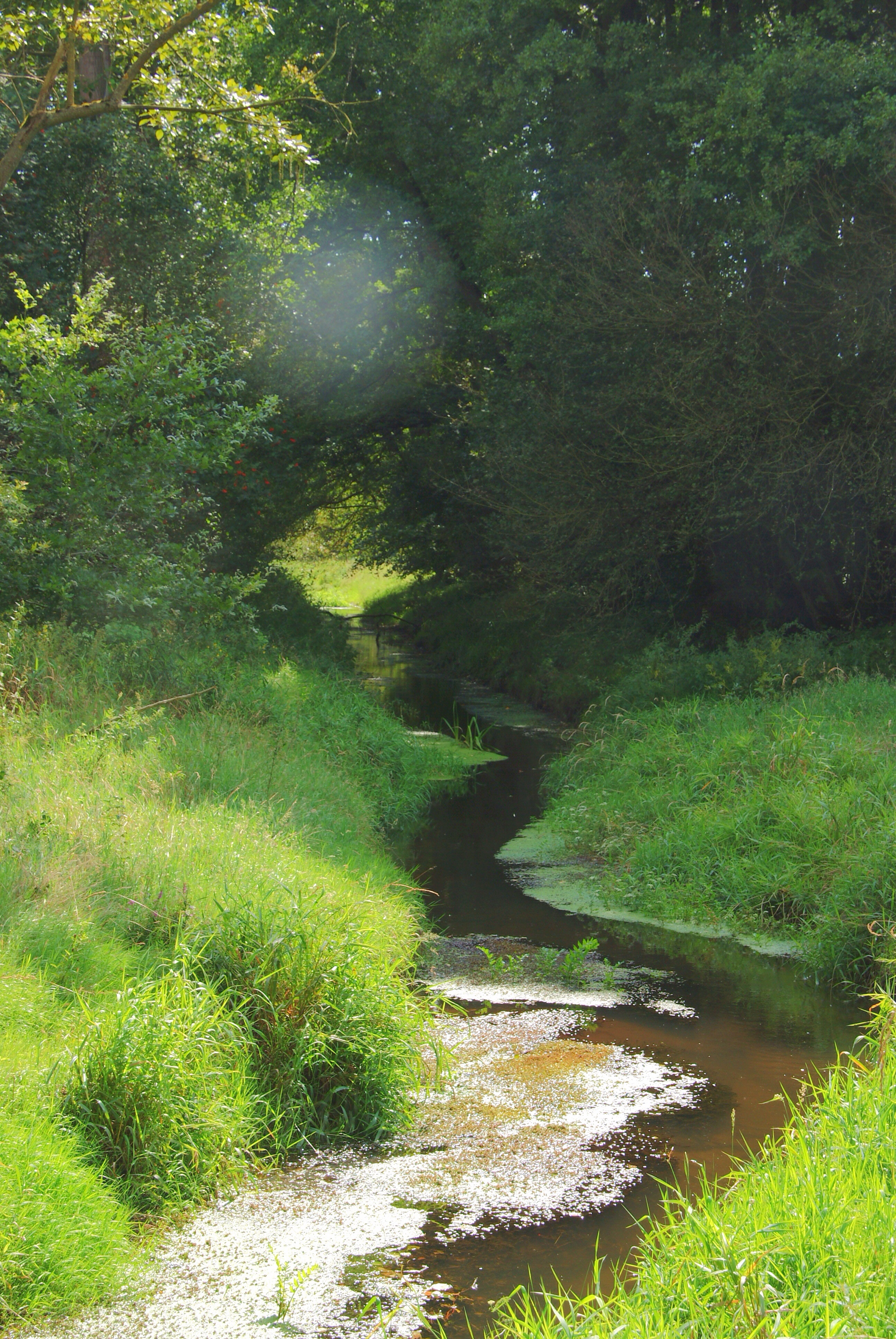
- The Schwienau before Bode (part of Hanstedt)

Location
- Country: Germany
- State: Lower Saxony

Physical characteristics
- Source
  - location: In the Lüneburg Heath near Wriedel
  - coordinates: 53°01′14″N 10°16′59″E
  - elevation: 73 m above sea level (NN)
- Mouth
  - location: near Groß Süstedt (a district of Gerdau) into the Gerdau
  - coordinates: 52°58′17″N 10°23′23″E
  - elevation: 48 m above sea level (NN)
- Length: 19.2 km (11.9 mi)

Basin features
- Progression: Gerdau→ Ilmenau→ Elbe→ North Sea
- Landmarks: Villages: Brockhöfe, Bode, Hanstedt I, Ebstorf, Wittenwater, Stadorf, Linden, Groß Süstedt
- Tributaries
  - left: Wriedeler Bach

Schwienau is a river of Lower Saxony, Germany. It is a left tributary of the Gerdau.

The Schwienau is 19 km (12 mi) long. It rises in the Weidebruch north of Brockhöfe near Wriedel. Initially the Schwienau flows through near-natural grassland landscape. After 2.5 kilometres (1.6 mi) it has been straightened and directed past a pumping station. It discharges north of Groß Süstedt (a district of the municipality Gerdau) into the river Gerdau.

The Schwienau has been artificially straightened throughout much of its route and rarely flows in its natural channel. The banks either side are mainly used for agriculture. Only at Wriedel and east of it the river runs through small woods and untended heath. Its fluvial sediment consists mainly of sand and mud. This affords a habitat particularly for leeches, snails and shrimp-like animals called scuds. Its water is generally only moderately contaminated.

== Tributaries ==
- Wriedeler Bach
- Allenbosteler Graben
- Oechtringer Bach
- Schliepbach
- Bruchgraben
- Wittenwater

== See also ==
- List of rivers of Lower Saxony
