= Enckhausen =

Enckhausen is the family name of the following persons

- Heinrich Enckhausen (1799–1885), German organist, composer and singing teacher
- Johannes Enckhausen (died 1699), German clergyman and superintendent in Ebstorf
- Johannes Enckhausen (1676–1758), German clergyman and superintendent in Sulingen und Sievershausen
- Malwine Enckhausen (1843–1932), pseudonym: I. Herzog, German author
