= Altes Amt Ebstorf =

Former municipality in Lower Saxony, Germany

- Samtgemeinde
- Interactive map of Altes Amt Ebstorf
- Location within Germany Location within Lower Saxony
- Coordinates: 53°01′44″N 10°24′47″E
- Country: Germany
- State: Lower Saxony
- District: Uelzen
- Disbanded: 1 November 2011
- Subdivisions: 5 municipalities

Area
  - Total: 252.77 km^{2} (97.60 sq mi)
- Elevation: 65 m (213 ft)

Population (2010-12-31)
  - Total: 10,225
  - Density: 40.452/km^{2} (104.77/sq mi)
- Time zone: UTC+01:00 (CET)
  - Summer (DST): UTC+02:00 (CEST)
- Postal codes: 29574
- Dialling codes: 05822
- Vehicle registration: UE
- Website: www.ebstorf.de

Altes Amt Ebstorf is a former Samtgemeinde (lit. 'collective municipality') in the district of Uelzen, in Lower Saxony, Germany. Its seat was in the village Ebstorf. At the 1 November 2011 local government reform, the Samtgemeinden Bevensen and Altes Amt Ebstorf merged to form the new Samtgemeinde Bevensen-Ebstorf.

In the 2011 census, Altes Amt Ebstorf had a population of 10,337.

The Samtgemeinde Altes Amt Ebstorf comprised the following municipalities:

1. Ebstorf
2. Hanstedt
3. Natendorf
4. Schwienau
5. Wriedel
