= Wessenstedt =

Village in Lower Saxony, Germany

Coordinates: 53°03′27″N 10°27′11″E

Wessenstedt is located in the Lüneburg Heath, is a quarter of Natendorf having about 150 inhabitants and belongs to Altes Amt Ebstorf of district Uelzen, Lower Saxony.

Wessenstedt is known for the discovery of a nearby Urnfield. The pottery has been used as an archeological marker corresponding to the Iron Age period known otherwise as Hallstatt "C". However, unlike Hallstatt, this site is not considered Celtic and rather Germanic instead. The "Wessenstedt culture" (800 - 600 BC) spreading north of Hannover is named after this village.

Noteworthy are characteristics lingering from Bronze Age, such as low tumuli containing small stone chests and pottery of equal height having a conical neck and body.

To Wessenstedt also belongs the former vineyard of the Ebstorf Abbey.
