= Gerdau (disambiguation) =

Gerdau is a Brazilian steel company.

Gerdau may also refer to:

== Geography ==
- Gerdau, Germany, a town in Germany
- Gerdau (river), a river in Germany

== Other uses ==
- Gerdau (surname), a surname
