= Suderburg (disambiguation) =

Suderburg is a district in Lower Saxony, Germany. It may also refer to:

- Suderburg (Samtgemeinde), a collective municipality in Uelzen, Lower Saxony, Germany

== People ==
- Erika Suderburg, American filmmaker
- Robert Suderburg (1936–2013), American composer and pianist
