= Wriedeler Bach =

River in Germany

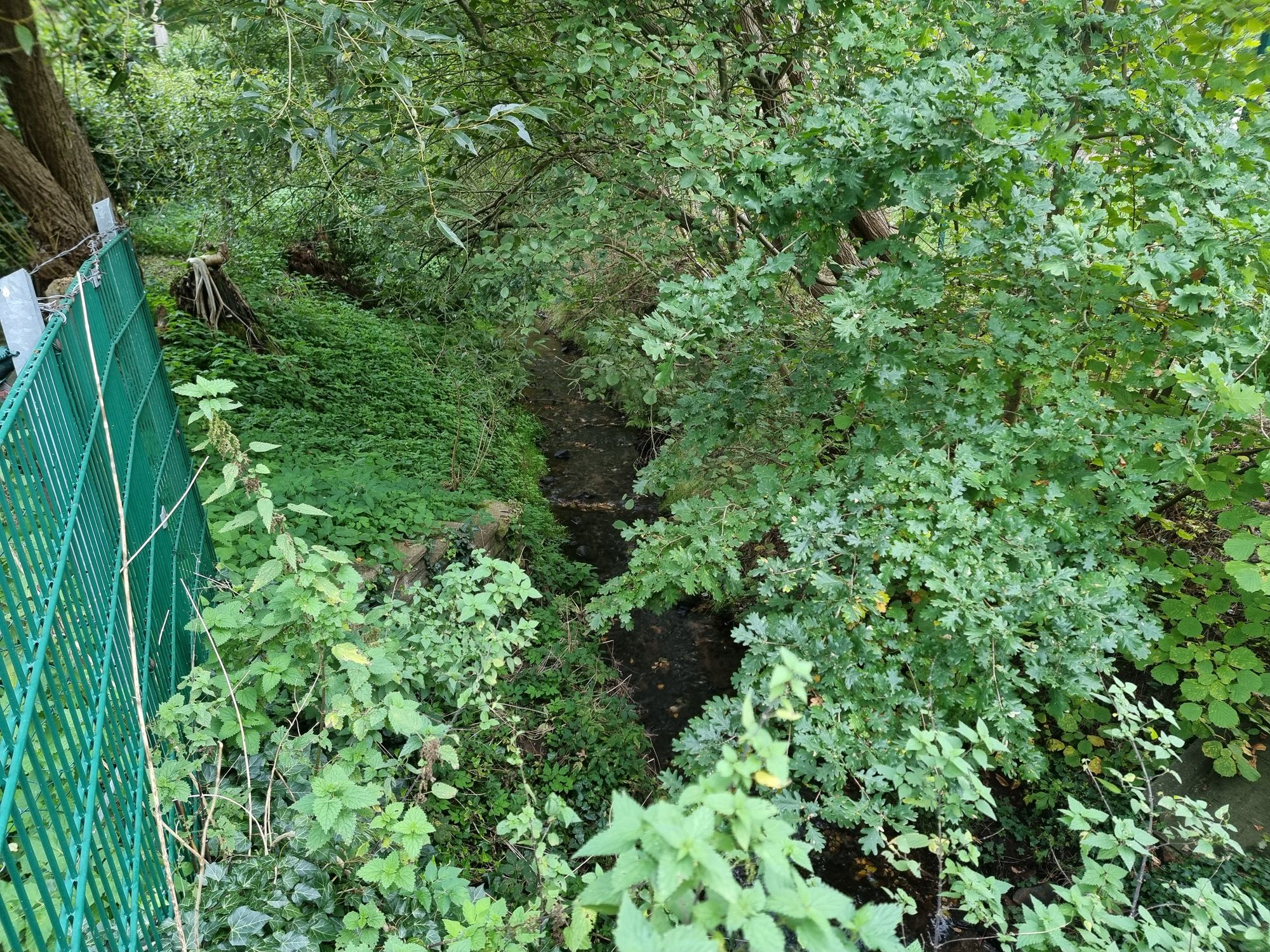

Location
- Country: Germany
- State: Lower Saxony

Physical characteristics
- Mouth
  - location: Schwienau
  - coordinates: 53.0272°N 10.3255°E

Basin features
- Progression: Schwienau→ Gerdau→ Ilmenau→ Elbe→ North Sea

Wriedeler Bach is a small river of Lower Saxony, Germany. It flows into the Schwienau near Wriedel.

== See also ==
- List of rivers of Lower Saxony
