= Hösseringen =

- Ortsteil of Suderburg
- Interactive map of Hösseringen
- Location within Germany Location within Lower Saxony
- Coordinates: 52°51′37″N 10°25′05″E
- Country: Germany
- State: Lower Saxony
- District: Uelzen
- Municipal assoc.: Suderburg
- Municipality: Suderburg

Area
  - Total: 36.68 km^{2} (14.16 sq mi)
- Elevation: 71 m (233 ft)

Population (2017-12-31)
  - Total: 571
  - Density: 15.6/km^{2} (40.3/sq mi)
- Time zone: UTC+01:00 (CET)
  - Summer (DST): UTC+02:00 (CEST)
- Postal codes: 29556
- Dialling codes: 05826

Hösseringen is a village in the collective municipality of Suderburg and lies southwest of Uelzen in the German state of Lower Saxony.

== Geography ==
Hösseringen lies between Hamburg and Hanover in the middle of the Lüneburg Heath. The village is dominated by the landscape of the High Heath (Hohe Heide) and extensive forests that surround it and that stretch as far as Eschede to the southwest.

=== Geology ===
Terminal moraines from the penultimate ice age run through the parish forming several hillocks and low ridges. The Hardau stream rises about 2 km southeast of the village centre, running through the Hardau valley between Holxen and Holdenstedt before emptying into the Gerdau.

== History ==
The village was first recorded in 1247.

== Culture and sights ==
=== Tourism ===
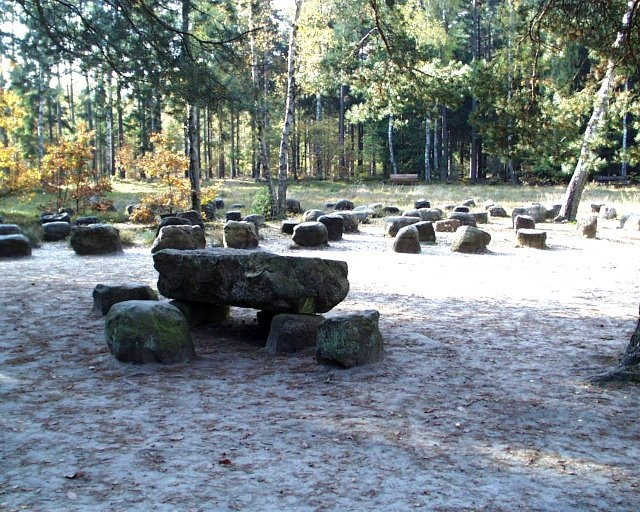
The Landtagsplatz

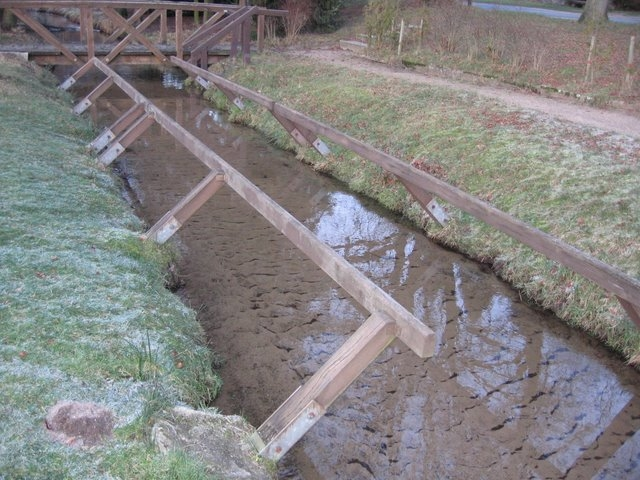
Water-treading facility

Aside from agriculture, tourism is an important source of income for the village.

The village is known nationally for the Hösseringen Museum Village which covers an area of about 10 ha. The museum village is also a starting point for the Schooten forest educational trail that runs through the forest of the same name and describes the development of agriculture and forestry in the Lüneburg Heath at 10 information points.

In the immediate vicinity of the museum village is the Landtagsplatz, which was the place of assembly in the Middle Ages (1355-1652) for the provincial parliament or Landtag. The Landtagsplatz consists of numerous glacial erratics that were used as seats for the representatives of the villages in the district of Uelzen.

In addition Hösseringen is also the starting point for the 26 km long water experience path that runs as far as Uelzen. Stations along the way include the water-treading trough at the village pond and the artificial lake of the Hardausee, near to which there is also a campsite and barbecue area.

Another attraction is the 34-metre-high (112 ft) observation tower, built in 2003, that is situated between Hösseringen and Räber. The tower acts simultaneously as a bearer for mobile telephone antennas.

There is also a watermill on the Lower Saxon Mill Road near the village centre; although it is no longer in use.

== Sources ==
- Tilman Grottian: Geschichte der Gemeinde Suderburg. Festschrift zum 1000-jährigen Jubiläum im Jahr 2004. 1st ed. Edition: Anderweit, May 2004, ISBN 3-931824-33-0
