= Gruppe S =

German terrorist organization

- Leader: Werner S.
- Dates active: 2019–2020
- Active regions: Germany
- Ideology: Antisemitism; Anti-communism; National conservatism; Social conservatism; Euroscepticism; German nationalism; Neo-fascism; Neo-Nazism; Right-wing populism
- Political position: Far-right

Gruppe S ("Group S"), named after founder Werner S., was an alleged far-right terrorist group in Germany that emerged on the internet in September 2019 and was dismantled in February 2020 with the arrest of several militants. They are said to have armed themselves in a few months, conducted target practice and planned simultaneous assassinations of Muslims in mosques, prominent politicians and people close to anti-fascist movements.

== History ==
According to the Public Prosecutor General of the Federal Court of Justice Peter Frank in his official press release, several raids were carried out on 14 February 2020. Twelve members of German nationality were arrested, including Werner S., Michael B., Thomas N. and Tony E., listed as prime suspects, as well as Thorsten W., Ulf R., Wolfgang W., Markus K., Frank H., Marcel W., Stefan K., and Steffen B. listed as supporters of a terrorist organization. Another member of the group had been a police informant since October 2019 and was not arrested.

In the group's WhatsApp chat, there were at least 15 people, five of whom described themselves as "hardline militants". Two more men are said to have soon left the group. It is believed that the group may have had almost 25 members.

=== Main suspects ===
Werner S. was 53 years old when he was arrested and was known as "Teutonico" on the nationalist scene. Investigators consider him the "undisputed head" of the moderately organized group and therefore he was classified as a threat several months before his arrest. He was a native of Mickhausen in Landkreis Augsburg and is said to have coordinated the group's meetings.

According to a media investigation, he has nine previous convictions, for offenses such as fraud, blackmail, abuse of titles and use of a knuckle glove in public during a right-wing demonstration. In 2007, he was on an internal list of Alternative for Germany stakeholders at its Munich headquarters, recontacting the party in 2017, and showing interest in the party. He is a trained restaurateur and had only moved to Mickhausen a few years before the arrest. There, it is said that he remained largely poor in contact and unknown. On Facebook, he called himself "Werner Schmidt." Many of his 200 or so Facebook friends shared symbols of neo-Nazism. One was an AfD official, another administrative official in Börde, Saxony-Anhalt. He is said to have made many contacts through the chat group "Freikorps Heimat". Even the historically preloaded name expressed an intention to eliminate democracy. In monitored phone calls and chats, he threatened after a speech by Federal President Frank-Walter Steinmeier: "This traitor will pay."

48-year-old Michael B. was a Kirchheim unter Teck family man who was known as an athlete in the city. He had been running a two-person small-order business in the metal industry for three years. His business partner was completely shocked by his arrest. Nothing is known about the weapons seized by Michael B.

Thomas N. of Minden worked as a tiler. He had covered his company car with a flag of the German Empire. In his Facebook profile he considered that the federal government and the Reichsbürger movement are illegally in office, called Chancellor Angela Merkel a "criminal creature", warned against the alleged chemtrails, and wrote about the Antifa: "It is time to clean up this dirt."

Tony E. (39), a native of Lüneburg, had moved to Wriedel in the Uelzen district a few months ago. He worked on construction sites in Dubai. In his private life, he collected weapons to "defend Germany." On his Facebook profile, he collected names and groups popular with German right-wing radicals, where he was actively involved.

=== Alleged supporters ===
Thorsten W. worked for the police administration in Hamm, (North Rhine-Westphalia), until February 2020. In 2013 and 2014, he worked in the area of "gun permits" at the police headquarters and participated in gun license verification. Most recently, he worked in the traffic department. In his spare time, he often dressed as a Germanic warrior and had himself photographed with a sword and shield decorated with runes. In one of his profiles on social networks there were numerous images of swastikas and the Schutzstaffel. Since 2018, he had hoisted a Reichskriegsflagge on his balcony, wore clothing brands associated with the right and had affixed the stickers with the slogan "do not throw lying press" on his door. It was common for him to share messages on his social networks where he justified some attacks such as the shootings in Christchurch in 2019. These behaviors did not lead to disciplinary consequences at work.

Markus K. (35) from Minden, is a long-time neo-Nazi who is said to have belonged to the organizing team of several far-right demonstrations in Bad Nenndorf. He was involved in an attack by hundreds of neo-Nazis at a demonstration organized by the German Trade Union Federation, on 1 May 2009 in Dortmund, as did Stephan Ernst, the alleged main culprit in the murder of Walter Lübcke.

Several members had contacts with the extremist group "Soldiers of Odin" (SOO). Steffen B., from Salzlandkreis, Saxony-Anhalt showed a photo of patrolling men wearing the group's logo on his Facebook profile. He and Stefan K. were among the regional leaders of the vigilante organization "Vikings Security Germania". According to an MDR Fernsehen investigation, Steffen B. and Stefan K. participated in a neo-Nazi torch march in Magdeburg in November 2018, in which the "Viking Security Germania" had been called in to give "security to the event."

Frank H. from Munich proclaimed himself the "president" of the group "Wodans Erben Germanien" which emerged in Bavaria as a branch of "Soldiers of Odin". In 2019, his group broke into an accommodation for asylum seekers in Moosach, demonstrated in front of the Munich Jewish Center, marched with torches to Zeppelin Field, and other historical buildings related to the Third Reich in Nuremberg.

Marcel W. from the Pfaffenhofen District, operator of an Internet mail order company, was also a member of "Wodans Erben" and referred to himself as "Sergeant-at-Arms", the group's security and orderly manager. Other members were related to the "German-German Cultural Association", "Freikorps Heimatschutz", "Freikorps Deutschland" and similar neo-Nazi groups.

Marion G., a trained hairdresser from a small town in Franconia, became radicalized after reading an investigative note from the weekly newspaper Die Zeit, where she discussed the current refugee crisis in Germany. She was 50 years old at the time, did not know refugees, but according to her own statements, she feared attacks against herself and her children and wanted to "be quiet again". Since the Summer of 2018, it has organized demonstrations of the yellow vests in Nuremberg.

Jürgen K. first registered for a chat in Gruppe S at the end of July 2019 and introduced himself as a native of Brandenburg who had been living in Poland for more than twelve years. He works there as an industrial electrician and sits as a nonpartisan member of the local council. He sent a photo to show the plastic explosives he stored, shortly after, he shared a photo of himself with a Skorpion vz. 61 submachine gun. Since November 2019, he wrote less and less in the chat groups and no longer participated in the meeting at the end of 2019, where the group planned simultaneous attacks on six mosques and purchase of weapons in the Czech Republic.

Another alleged Koblenz member was arrested after posting on the Russian platform vk.com, Muslims should be eliminated from the world: "It is time for the people, otherwise, we are history."

The informant who had helped the police had spent more than 20 years in various jails, psychiatric clinics and penal institutions, among other things, for robbery and arrest of a policeman, and was identified as violent. He was released in the spring of 2017. According to his own information, in the summer of 2019 he contacted an extremist chat group, which was looking for "patriots who were willing to fight and who were determined to do everything." After a few weeks, Werner S.'s radicalization scared him, so he contacted the security authorities and reported the terrorist plans.

== Recruitment on the Internet ==
Since the fall of 2018, Marion G. created private groups on Facebook for “comrades who didn't just want to chat”. As of January 2019, she founded the chat group "Der harte Kern" and other chat groups in the messaging service such as Telegram, where she met and added more extremists over the months. In these chat groups and by phone, Werner S. was looking for men who were willing to make direct attacks. The profile Werner was looking for in applicants was that they had to be "smart, tough, brutal, fast, energetic" and trust yourself to "do more than participate in demonstrations." Werner recruited his members in very different settings, in Facebook groups, Twitter, Telegram, self-defense groups, rock clubs and neo-Nazi collectives who were united by their hatred of foreigners, refugees and Muslims. In the group they showed in the phone calls and intercepted talks a mixture of imperial bourgeoisie, Germanic mythology and xenophobia. In addition, the group did not rule out the use of suicide attacks, according to the findings of the researchers initially planned to use online recruitment to build a "clandestine army" inspired by the "Freikorps" during the Weimar Republic.

In their talks, the group is said to have also shared photographs of weapons that they themselves made, as well as sharing their fantasies of violence. Several of the participating members were "Preppers and had begun to gather supplies and weapons, although Marion had a particularly close relationship with Werner S., they never exchanged views with him or other members of the chat about weapons and threats of attack. Werner S.'s arrest surprised her, so she deleted their chats from her mobile phone after finding out.
