= Gerdau (river) =

River in Germany

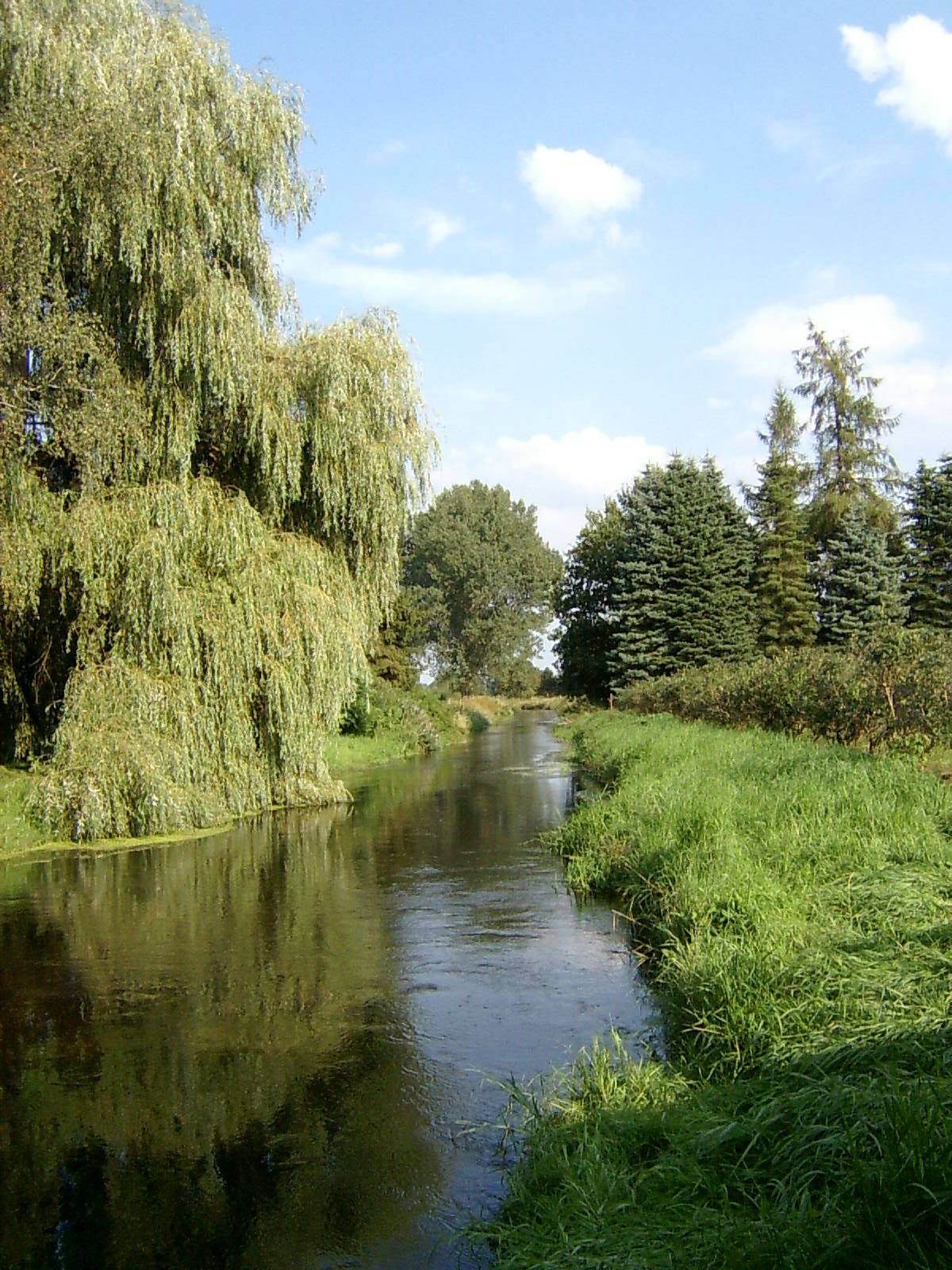
- The Gerdau near Groß Süstedt (municipality Gerdau)

Location
- Country: Germany
- State: Lower Saxony
- Location: Counties of Celle and Uelzen
- Reference no.: DE: 5942

Physical characteristics
- Source
  - location: In the Lüneburg Heath between Faßberg and Eimke
  - coordinates: 52°56′31″N 10°14′22″E
  - elevation: ca. 70 m above sea level (NHN)
- Mouth
  - location: Confluence: Near Veerßen (Uelzen) with the Stederau to become the Ilmenau
  - coordinates: 52°56′51″N 10°33′13″E
  - elevation: ca. 35 m above sea level (NHN)
- Length: 29.71 km
- Basin size: 427.74 km^{2} (165.15 sq mi)

Basin features
- Progression: Ilmenau→ Elbe→ North Sea
- Landmarks: Large towns: Uelzen; Villages: Faßberg, Eimke, Gerdau
- Tributaries
  - left: Schwienau (for these and others see section tributaries)
  - right: Häsebach, Hardau (for these and others see section tributaries)
- Hydrologically the main headstream of the Ilmenau

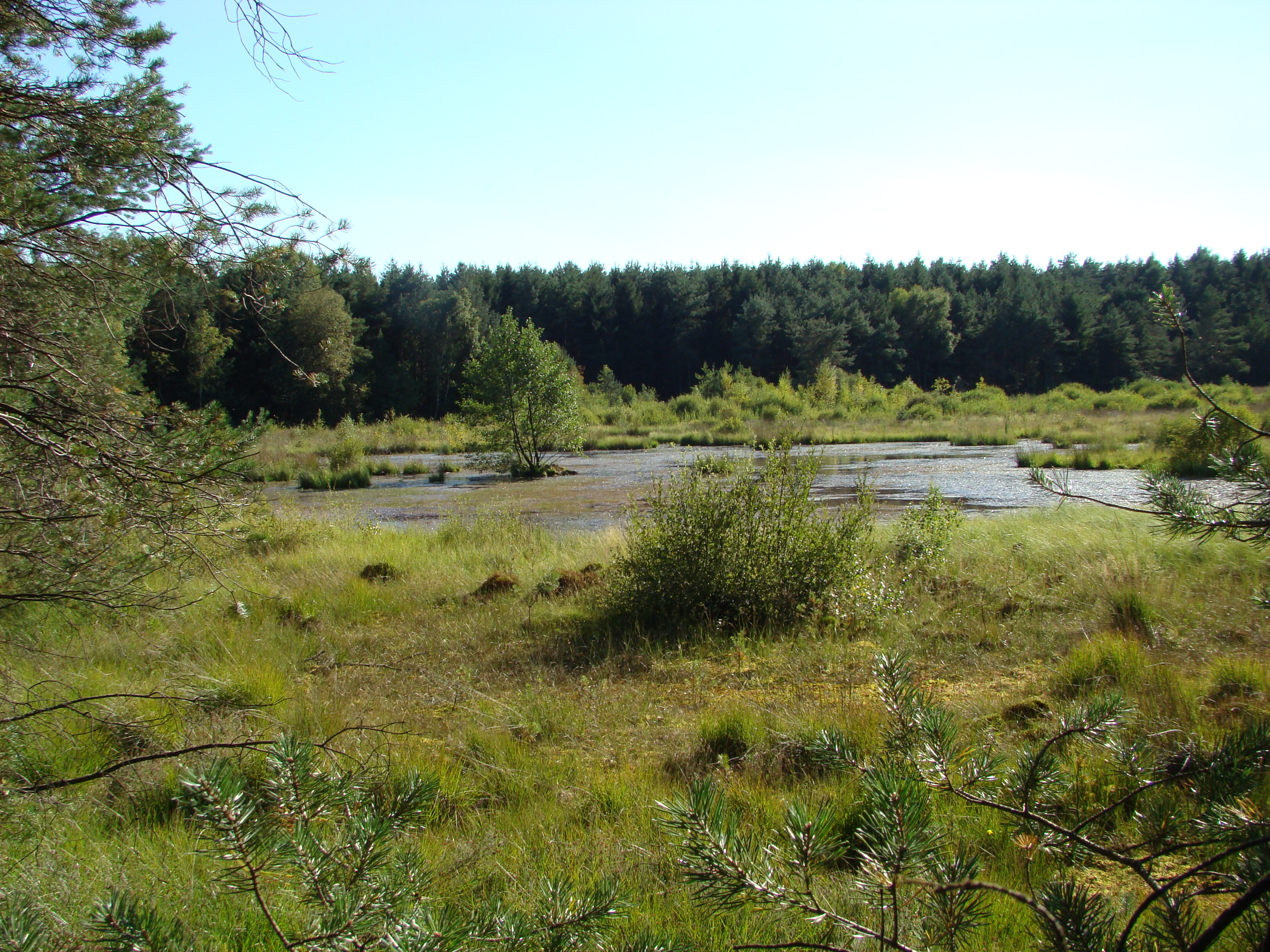
Brambostel Moor, the source region of the Gerdau

The Gerdau is a 30 km (19 mi) long, left (western) source river for the Ilmenau in the north German state of Lower Saxony.

The river rises in the eastern part of the Lüneburg Heath on the northeastern edge of the Südheide Nature Park. From its source, which is located in the Brambostel Moor Nature Reserve, north of the 94 m high Faßberg, the Gerdau flows by the villages of Eimke and Gerdau towards Uelzen. South of Uelzen it merges with the Stederau to form the Ilmenau.

== Tributaries ==
- Hardau
- Häsebach
- Schwienau
- Lindener Graben
- Ellendorfer Graben
- Wichtenbeker Graben

== See also ==
- List of rivers of Lower Saxony
