= Weste =

Weste may refer to:

== People ==
- Gretna Margaret Weste (1917–2006), Australian pathologist and mycologist
- Neil Weste (born 1951), Australian inventor and engineer

== Places ==
- Weste, Lower Saxony, Germany

== See also ==
- West
