= Rätzlingen =

Rätzlingen may refer to the following places in Germany:

- Rätzlingen, Lower Saxony
- Rätzlingen, Saxony-Anhalt
