= Böddenstedt =

- Ortsteil of Suderburg
- Interactive map of Böddenstedt
- Location within Germany Location within Lower Saxony
- Coordinates: 52°55′51.96″N 10°26′35.88″E
- Country: Germany
- State: Lower Saxony
- District: Uelzen
- Municipality: Suderburg

Area
  - Total: 9.59 km^{2} (3.70 sq mi)
- Elevation: 61 m (200 ft)

Population (2017-12-31)
  - Total: 486
  - Density: 50.7/km^{2} (131/sq mi)
- Time zone: UTC+01:00 (CET)
  - Summer (DST): UTC+02:00 (CEST)
- Postal codes: 29556
- Dialling codes: 05826

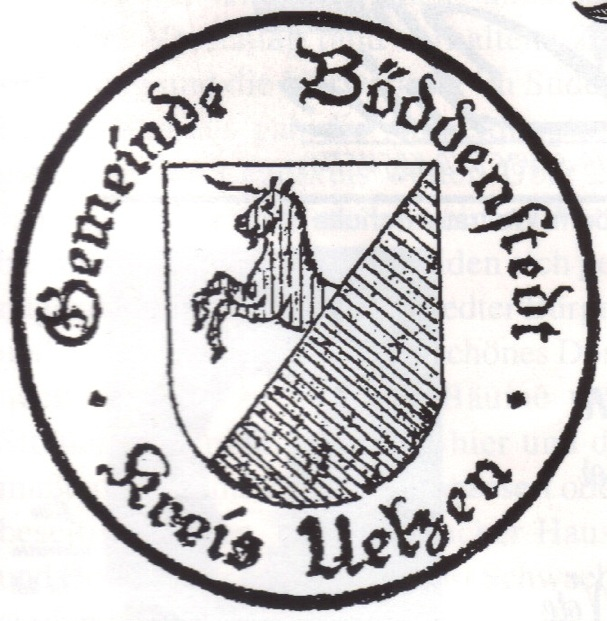
Böddenstedt's coat of arms

Böddenstedt is a village in the municipality of Suderburg in the collective municipality of Suderburg and lies in southwest of the district of Uelzen in the German state of Lower Saxony.

== Geography ==
The farming and handicrafts village of Böddenstedt lies between Hamburg and Hanover in the middle of the Lüneburg Heath. The Stahlbach stream – formerly also called the Böddenstedter Aue – flows along the southern edge of the village from west to east and is accompanied by fish ponds and a flat countryside of meadows and pasture. Böddenstedt has the form of a Haufendorf or irregularly nucleated village.

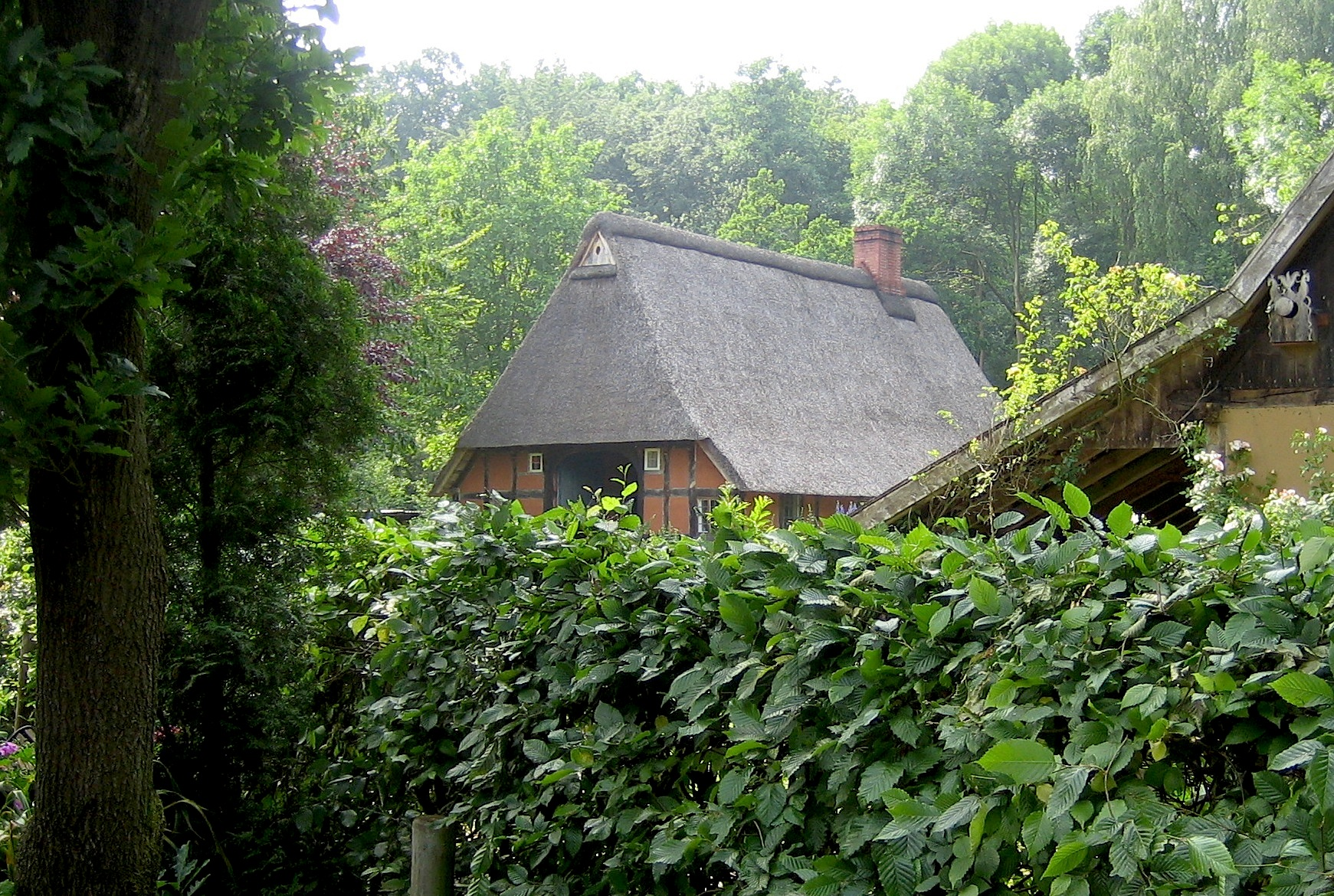
1701 thatched timber-framed house in Mühlenstraße

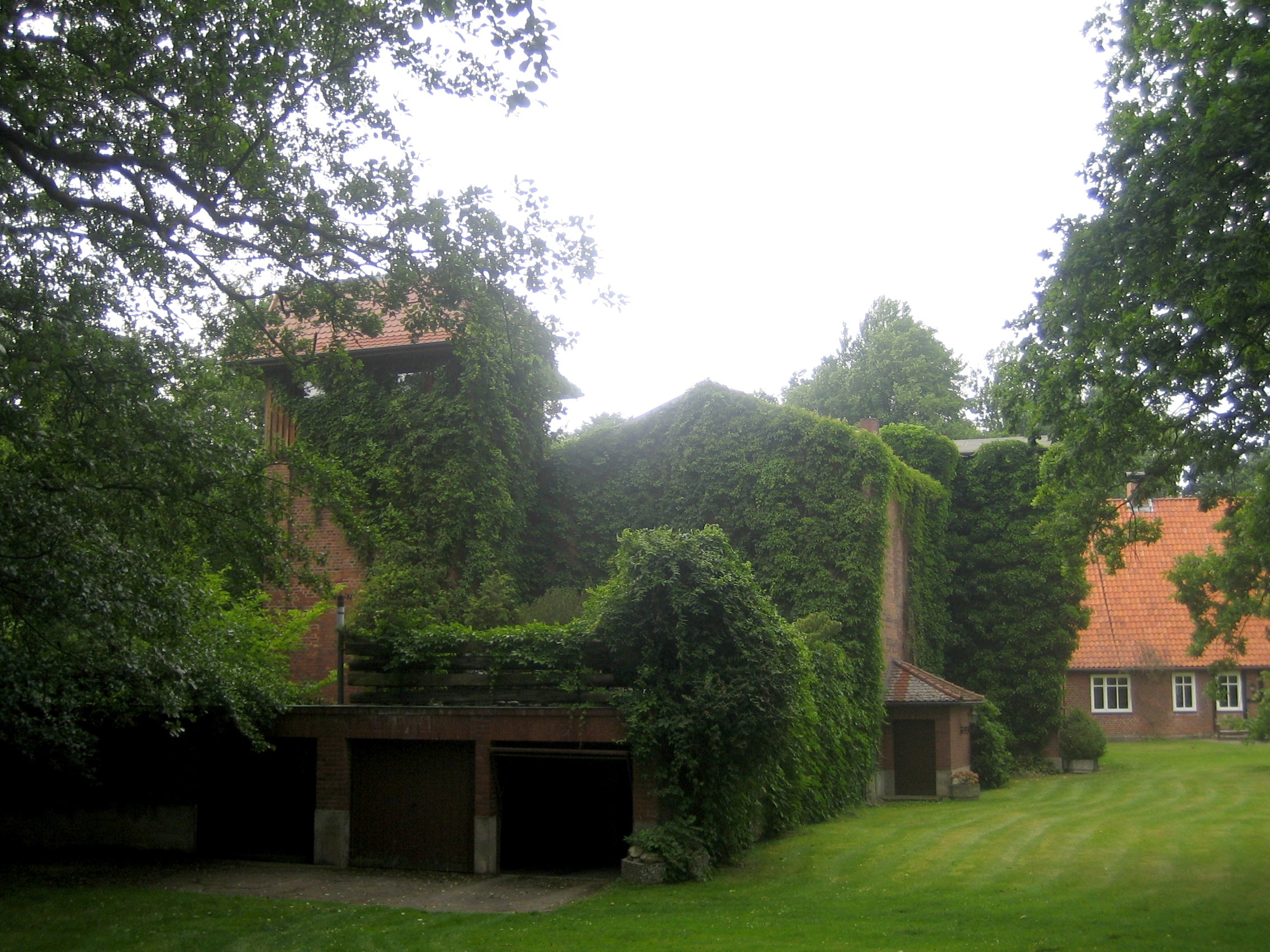
Water mill converted into a house

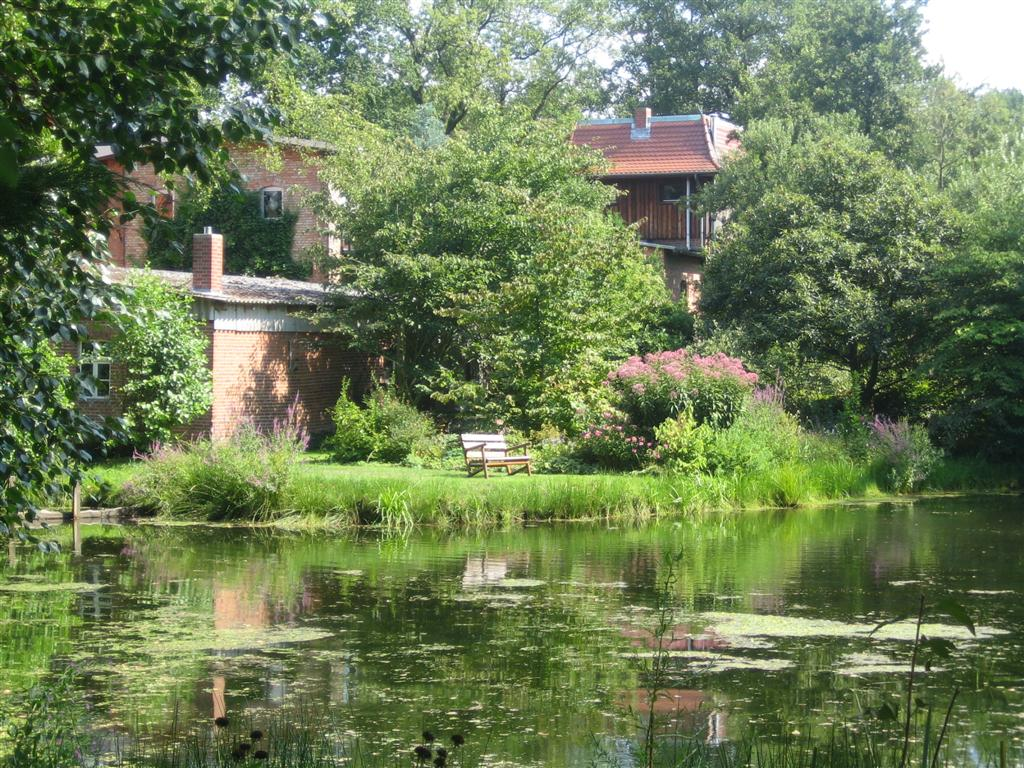
The millpond

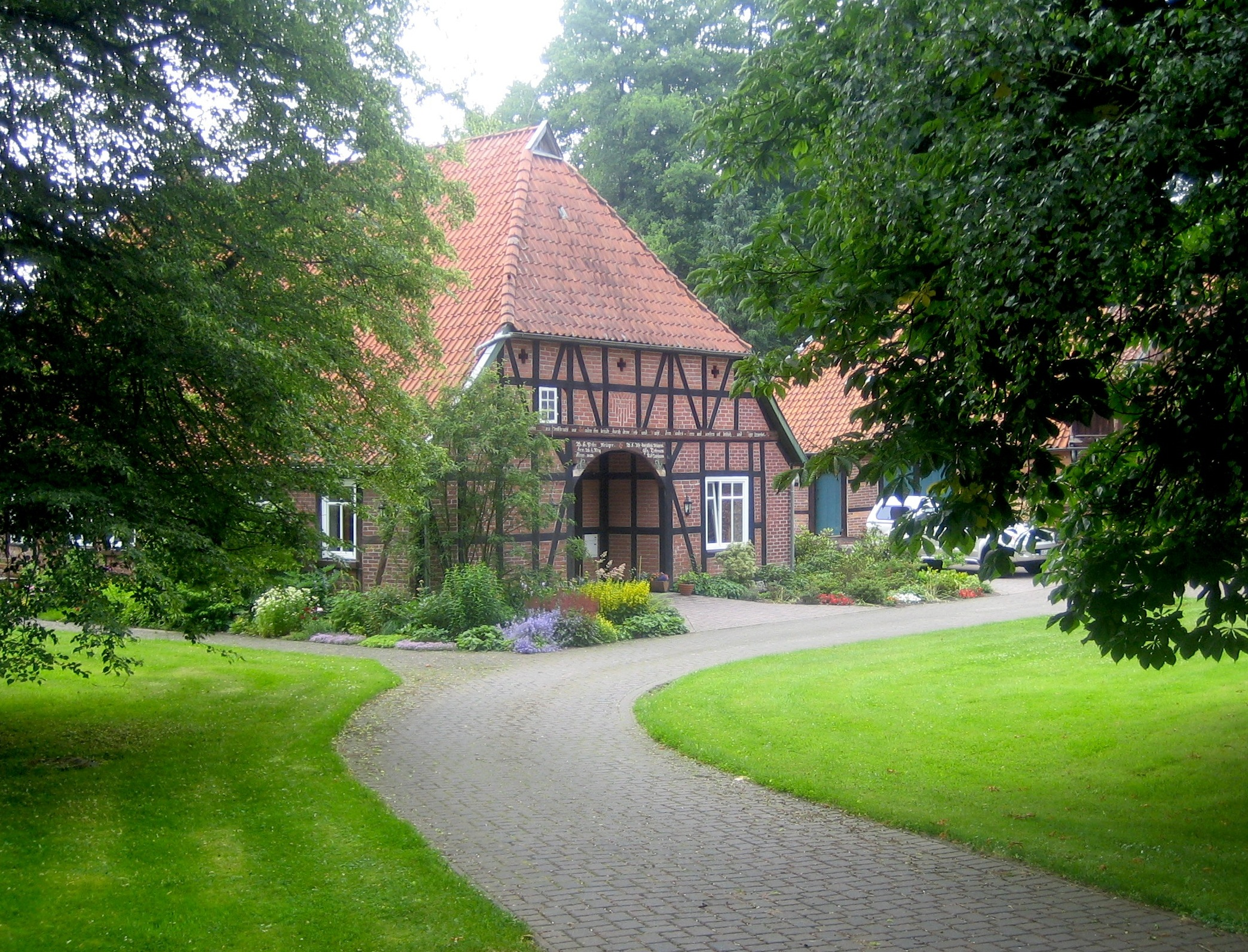
Typical heath farm in Böddenstedt (from 1800)

== Personalities ==
- Klaus Wiswe (born 30 October 1955 in Böddenstedt), German politician (CDU), full-time chief executive (Landrat) of the district of Celle, chairman of the Lower Saxon District Committee (Niedersächsischer Landkreistag)
