= Olaf Dammann =

German-American physician and philosopher

Olaf Dammann is a German-American physician, epidemiologist, and philosopher. He is a professor of Public Health & Community Medicine at Tufts University School of Medicine. His main contributions are in neonatal brain and retina damage causation research and in philosophy of epidemiology.

== Early life ==
Dammann was born on 23 September 1961 in Ebstorf, Lower-Saxony and grew up in nearby Uelzen. He graduated from Herzog-Ernst-Gymnasium in 1980.

== Career ==
Dammann entered the linguistics program at the University of Hamburg in 1981. He transferred to Lübeck Medical School in 1983 to begin studying medicine, which he finished in 1991 back at the University of Hamburg with a dissertation (Dr.med.) on minor neurological abnormalities in very low birthweight children at early school age. From 1991 - 1995 he worked in the Department of Pediatrics at the University of Hamburg with a focus on neonatology and neuropediatrics.

In 1995, he moved to Boston (USA) as a Research Fellow in the Neuroepidemiology Unit at Boston Children's Hospital. He received a master's degree in clinical epidemiology (S.M.) at the Harvard School of Public Health in 1997 and went on to become one of the inaugural co-investigators of the ELGAN-Study.

Between 2002 and 2006, Dammann served as the Wilhem-Hirte Research Professor at Hannover Medical School, Germany. He returned to Boston as a research professor in pediatrics at Tufts University School of Medicine and joined the Department of Public Health & Community Medicine full-time in 2011, where he also served as Vice Chair from 2017 until 2023. His main research interest is the etiology of neonatal brain and retina damage; he has 200 publications in this research field. In 2018 he was appointed as an adjunct professor in the Department of Neuromedicine and Movement Sciences at the Norwegian University of Science and Technology in Trondheim, Norway.

Dammann obtained a doctorate in philosophy (Ph.D.) from the University of Johannesburg in 2019 with a thesis on illness causation theory and was appointed as a Distinguished Visiting professor at the same institution in 2022. He obtained certification in philosophical client counseling from the American Philosophical Practitioners Association in 2024.

== Books ==
- Extremely Preterm Birth and its Consequences: The ELGAN Study (1st ed.). Mac Keith Press. 8 March 2021. ISBN 978-1-911488-96-5
- Dammann, Olaf; Smart, Benjamin (29 October 2018). Causation in Population Health Informatics and Data Science (1st 2019 ed.). Springer.
- Dammann, Olaf (26 May 2020). Etiological Explanations: Illness Causation Theory. CRC Press. ISBN 978-0-429-53287-0
- Dammann, Olaf (1 December 2007). Flüstermond: Gedichte (in German). Husum. ISBN 978-3-89876-370-7
