= Hardau valley =

The Hardau valley (German: Hardautal) accompanies the heath river, the Hardau, in the Suderburg area in Uelzen district in the German state of Lower Saxony.

There is a Hardau Valley Cultural History Water Experience Path (Kulturhistorischen Wassererlebnispfad Hardautal) that runs for 27 kilometres along the Hardau valley.

The Hardau valley eventually opens into the Gerdau valley.
