= Klaus Wiswe =

German politician (born 1955)

Klaus Wiswe (born 1955) is a German politician, member of the Christian Democratic Union of Germany (CDU) and full-time chief executive or Landrat of the North German district of Celle.

Wiswe was born on 30 October 1955 in Böddenstedt in Uelzen district, and grew up in the village of Unterlüß in Celle district. After completing his A levels he studied law in Berlin and Göttingen. He worked for a short time as a solicitor and then became an advisor (Referent) and department head (Dezernent) in the administration for the state of Lower Saxony. From 1991 as a department head in the district office of Celle he was responsible for the areas of social, youth, health, environmental and construction policy as well as regional planning. Klaus Wiswe is married to veterinarian, Dr. Birgit Wiswe, and has two children.

On 21 February 1999 Wiswe was elected as the first full-time chief executive (Landrat) for the district of Celle. In the local elections on 10 September 2006 he was confirmed in office in the first round with 54.3% of the vote. His term of office now runs to 31 October 2014.

Wiswe is the first chairman of the Lower Saxon District Committee (Niedersächsischer Landkreistag).
