= Suhlendorf =

- Municipality
- Coat of arms

- Location of Suhlendorf within Uelzen district
- Interactive map of Suhlendorf
- Location within Germany Location within Lower Saxony
- Coordinates: 52°56′N 10°46′E
- Country: Germany
- State: Lower Saxony
- District: Uelzen
- Municipal assoc.: Rosche
- Subdivisions: 14

Government
  - Mayor: Hans-Heinrich Weichsel (CDU)

Area
  - Total: 61.04 km^{2} (23.57 sq mi)
- Elevation: 62 m (203 ft)

Population (2025-12-31)
  - Total: 2,216
  - Density: 36.30/km^{2} (94.03/sq mi)
- Time zone: UTC+01:00 (CET)
  - Summer (DST): UTC+02:00 (CEST)
- Postal codes: 29562
- Dialling codes: 05820
- Vehicle registration: UE
- Website: www.suhlendorf.de

Suhlendorf is a municipality in the district of Uelzen, in Lower Saxony, Germany. It includes the villages of Batensen, Dallahn, Dalldorf, Groß Ellenberg, Klein Ellenberg, Grabau, Güstau, Kölau, Molbath, Nestau, Növenthien, Rassau, Schlieckau and Wellendorf, as well as Klein Malchau and St. Omer.
