= Johannes Enckhausen (1676–1758) =

Johannes Enckhausen, also Johann Enckhausen and Johann Enckhusen, (born 1676 in Ebstorf; died 1758). was a German Evangelical Clergyman and Superintendent.

== Life ==
In 1701 Enckhausen worked at the church St. Marien in Uelzen, from 1710 as Superintendent in Sulingen and from 1734 as such in Sievershausen, where he still lived in 1750.

== Web Links ==
- Johann Enckhusen, Gemeinsamer Verbundkatalog (German)
