= Bevensen-Ebstorf =

Collective municipality in Lower-Saxony, Germany

- Samtgemeinde
- Location of Bevensen-Ebstorf within Uelzen district
- Interactive map of Bevensen-Ebstorf
- Location within Germany Location within Lower Saxony
- Coordinates: 53°04′N 10°32′E
- Country: Germany
- State: Lower Saxony
- District: Uelzen
- Seat: Bad Bevensen
- Subdivisions: 13 municipalities

Area
  - Total: 482.22 km^{2} (186.19 sq mi)

Population (2025-12-31)
  - Total: 26,292
  - Density: 54.523/km^{2} (141.21/sq mi)
- Time zone: UTC+01:00 (CET)
  - Summer (DST): UTC+02:00 (CEST)
- Website: www.bevensen-ebstorf.de

Bevensen-Ebstorf is a Samtgemeinde ("collective municipality") in the district of Uelzen, in Lower Saxony, Germany. Its seat is in the town Bad Bevensen. It was formed on 1 November 2011 by the merger of the former Samtgemeinden Bevensen and Altes Amt Ebstorf.

The Samtgemeinde Bevensen-Ebstorf consists of the following municipalities:

1. Altenmedingen
2. Bad Bevensen
3. Barum
4. Klosterflecken Ebstorf
5. Emmendorf
6. Hanstedt
7. Himbergen
8. Jelmstorf
9. Natendorf
10. Römstedt
11. Schwienau
12. Weste
13. Wriedel
