= Molbath =

Village in Lower Saxony, Germany

Coordinates: 52°58′N 10°43′E

Molbath is a small village in Lower Saxony, Germany. It has about 130 inhabitants and belongs to the commune of Suhlendorf. It was mentioned in historic documents under the name "Moolbaat," which may give a hint as to the traditional pronunciation, as this place name seems to be unique.
