= Stoetze =

- Municipality
- Coat of arms

- Location of Stoetze within Uelzen district
- Interactive map of Stoetze
- Location within Germany Location within Lower Saxony
- Coordinates: 53°04′N 10°47′E
- Country: Germany
- State: Lower Saxony
- District: Uelzen
- Municipal assoc.: Rosche
- Subdivisions: 9

Government
  - Mayor: Heinz Schulze (CDU)

Area
  - Total: 39.05 km^{2} (15.08 sq mi)
- Elevation: 74 m (243 ft)

Population (2025-12-31)
  - Total: 623
  - Density: 16.0/km^{2} (41.3/sq mi)
- Time zone: UTC+01:00 (CET)
  - Summer (DST): UTC+02:00 (CEST)
- Postal codes: 29597
- Dialling codes: 05872
- Vehicle registration: UE

Stoetze is a municipality in the district of Uelzen, in Lower Saxony, Germany.
