= Gustav Stresemann Institute =

German educational charity

Coordinates: 50°42′14.9″N 7°8′24.5″E

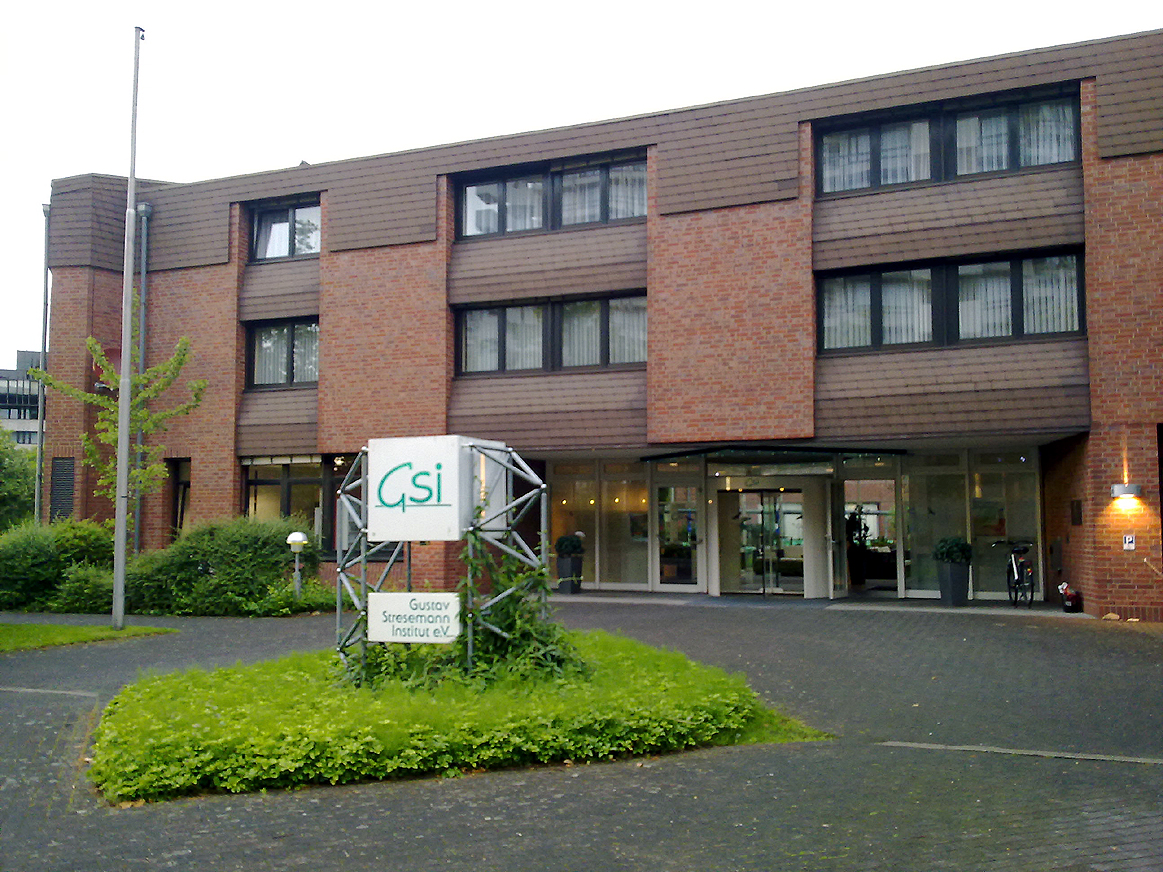
Gustav Stresemann Institute, Bonn

The Gustav Stresemann Institute (GSI), located in Bonn, Germany, is an educational and conference center established in 1949. Named after Gustav Stresemann, a Nobel Peace Prize laureate and prominent statesman of the Weimar Republic, the institute focuses on hosting seminars, workshops, and conferences covering a wide range of topics including politics, economics, culture, and social issues. It serves as a platform for dialogue and collaboration among individuals and organizations from diverse backgrounds and nations, with a mission to promote peace, understanding, and cooperation on both national and international levels.

== Purpose ==
The GSI is a registered charity and an independent, non-partisan and non-profit institution of civic education. The institute is named to appreciate the peace and European co-operation of the statesman and Nobel Peace Prize winner Gustav Stresemann. The GSI is in the Bonn neighborhood of Hochkreuz, and operates a conference center with a conference hotel as a European meeting and education center. It sees itself as a modern center for education, discussion, and meeting and a meeting place for people from all over the world. There are 1,400 events with more than 50,000 overnight stays per year including conferences, symposia, conferences, workshops and seminars on a wide range of subjects.

== Focus of training events ==
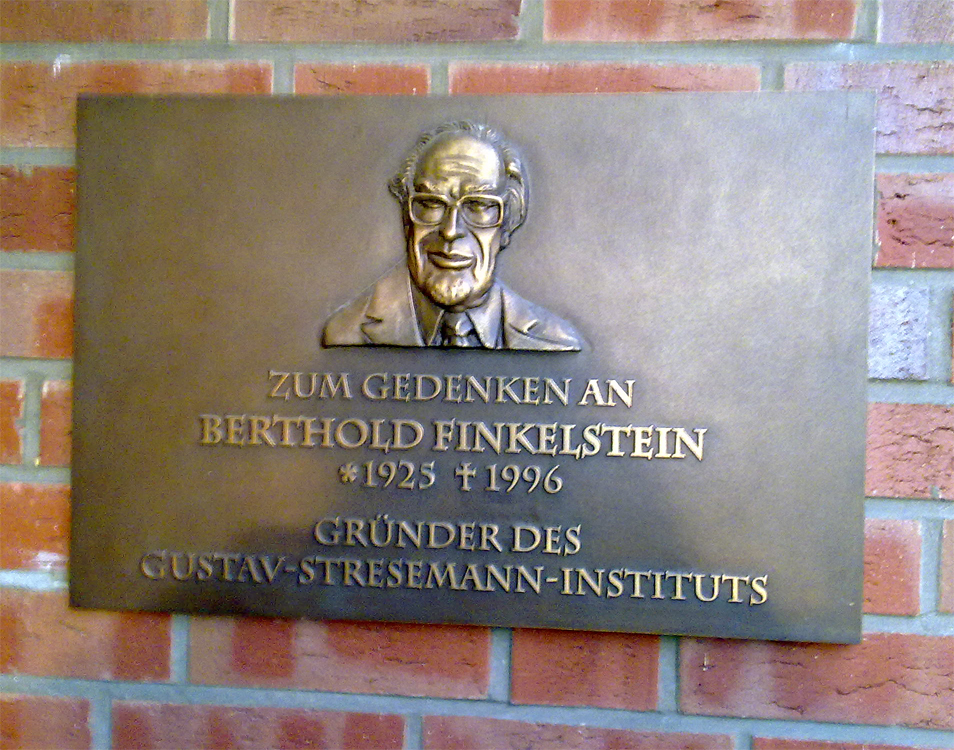
Commemorative plaque for Berthold Finkelstein, the founder of the Gustav Stresemann Institute

=== European Policy ===
- The new Europe, future of political and economic development
- Perspectives of European security policy
- The role of Europe in global politics of the 21st century

=== Aspects of International Policy and Cooperation ===
- North-South politics and development policy
- Franco-German relations and deepening of cooperation between German and French young people
- Current economic and socio-political issues such as reform of the welfare state, migration, demographic change, living together in a multicultural society
- Vocational guidance and training

== History ==
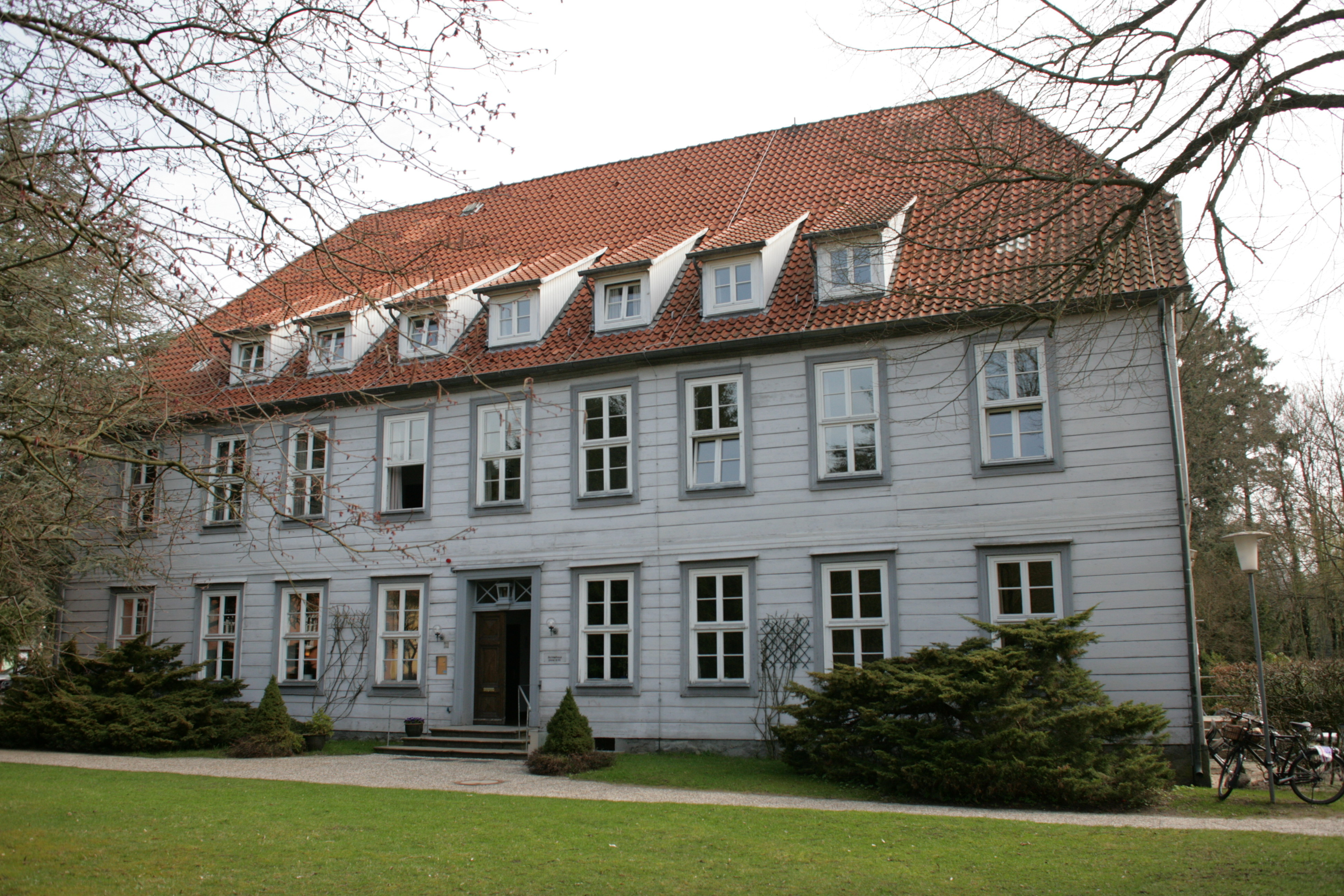
Bad Bevensen Medingen Stresemann Institute, 1978

- 1951, the International Youth Secretariat of European Movement was founded. It is the youth of Europe to cooperate in building a democratic and peaceful Europe. National Secretariats are established in all democratic states of Western Europe (see European Movement International). Head of the German Secretariat is Berthold Finkelstein (1925-1996).
- In 1959 the German Secretariat was transformed into an independent 'Institute of Education on national and European co-operation'. For the merits and efforts to appreciate peace and European co-operation of the statesman and Nobel Peace Prize winner Gustav Stresemann, the Institute was renamed the Gustav Stresemann Institute. Chairman of the GSI was Berthold Finkelstein, who headed the institution until 1996.
- 1961 The GSI moved into its own house with conference and accommodation capacities - the house Lerbach - in Bergisch Gladbach. This was expanded in the following years, and known under the name "European Academy Lerbach".
- 1972-1980 The GSI had had its own conference and training center in Bavaria, at Schloss Neuburg near Passau.
- 1978 the GSI built the 'European Academy' in Bad Bevensen (Niedersachsen).
- The GSI opened in 1987 the new, larger facility in Bonn and was meeting in the educational institution in Bergisch Gladbach.
- In 1996 came the election of a new chairman and new line heads GSI. Chairman was Erik Bettermann (State Landesvertretung Bremen), director was Klaus Dieter Leister. In 1999, both were re-elected.
- In 2002, the conference center was built in Bonn. Election of a new chairman and the management of GSI. Chairman and CEO was Leister.

== See also ==
- European Movement International
