= Johannes Enckhausen (died 1699) =

German clergyman (died 1699)

Johannes Enckhausen, also spelled Joannes Enckhusen, (born in Amelinghausen, died 1699) was a German clergyman and superintendent in Ebstorf. He worked as a clergyman in Ebstorf from 1671 to 1699, and as superintendent from 1678 at the latest. His name was immortalized in 1684 with "Bey Zeiten Superintendent / H(errn) JOANNIS ENCKHUSEN" on a wooden plaque on the high altar of Ebstorf Monastery.

His daughter was Lucia Elisabeth Steigerthal, wife of Christian Friedrich Steigerthal (1673–1723), a pastor in Hollenstedt.

== Literature ==
- Philipp Meyer: Die Pastoren der Landeskirchen Hannovers und Schaumburg-Lippes seit der Reformation, In Kommission bei Vandenhoeck & Ruprecht, 1941–1953
