= Oetzen =

- Municipality
- Coat of arms

- Location of Oetzen within Uelzen district
- Interactive map of Oetzen
- Location within Germany Location within Lower Saxony
- Coordinates: 53°01′N 10°41′E
- Country: Germany
- State: Lower Saxony
- District: Uelzen
- Municipal assoc.: Rosche
- Subdivisions: 6

Government
  - Mayor: Bernd Burmester (CDU)

Area
  - Total: 30.7 km^{2} (11.9 sq mi)
- Elevation: 49 m (161 ft)

Population (2025-12-31)
  - Total: 1,108
  - Density: 36.1/km^{2} (93.5/sq mi)
- Time zone: UTC+01:00 (CET)
  - Summer (DST): UTC+02:00 (CEST)
- Postal codes: 29588
- Dialling codes: 05805
- Vehicle registration: UE

Oetzen is a municipality in the district of Uelzen, in Lower Saxony, Germany.
