= Rosche =

- Municipality
- Coat of arms

- Location of Rosche within Uelzen district
- Interactive map of Rosche
- Location within Germany Location within Lower Saxony
- Coordinates: 52°59′N 10°45′E
- Country: Germany
- State: Lower Saxony
- District: Uelzen
- Municipal assoc.: Rosche
- Subdivisions: 17

Government
  - Mayor: Dieter Guhl (CDU)

Area
  - Total: 71.74 km^{2} (27.70 sq mi)
- Elevation: 52 m (171 ft)

Population (2025-12-31)
  - Total: 1,964
  - Density: 27.38/km^{2} (70.91/sq mi)
- Time zone: UTC+01:00 (CET)
  - Summer (DST): UTC+02:00 (CEST)
- Postal codes: 29571
- Dialling codes: 05803
- Vehicle registration: UE

Rosche is a municipality in the district of Uelzen, in Lower Saxony, Germany. It is situated approximately 13 km east of Uelzen.

Rosche is also the seat of the Samtgemeinde ("collective municipality") Rosche.
