= Rosche (Samtgemeinde) =

Samtgemeinde in Lower Saxony

- Samtgemeinde
- Location of Rosche within Uelzen district
- Interactive map of Rosche
- Location within Germany Location within Lower Saxony
- Coordinates: 52°59′N 10°45′E
- Country: Germany
- State: Lower Saxony
- District: Uelzen
- Seat: Rosche
- Subdivisions: 5 municipalities

Area
  - Total: 211.24 km^{2} (81.56 sq mi)

Population (2025-12-31)
  - Total: 6,378
  - Density: 30.19/km^{2} (78.20/sq mi)
- Time zone: UTC+01:00 (CET)
  - Summer (DST): UTC+02:00 (CEST)
- Website: www.samtgemeinde-rosche.de

Rosche is a Samtgemeinde ("collective municipality") in the district of Uelzen, in Lower Saxony, Germany. Its seat is in the village Rosche.

The Samtgemeinde Rosche consists of the following municipalities:

1. Oetzen
2. Rätzlingen
3. Rosche
4. Stoetze
5. Suhlendorf

As of 2023, the collective municipality had a population of 6,700 residents.
