= Malwine Enckhausen =

German writer

Malwine Enckhausen or Malvine Enckhausen pseudonym I. Herzog or L. Herzog (born October 29, 1843, in Hanover; died there March 20, 1932) was a German writer.

== Life ==
Enckhausen, born in the capital of the Kingdom of Hanover in 1843, was the daughter of the composer and court organist Heinrich Enckhausen, who worked at the castle church of the Leineschloss in Hanover. Her artistic expression was initially stimulated above all by her parents' regular social interactions and visits to the Hanoverian court theater.

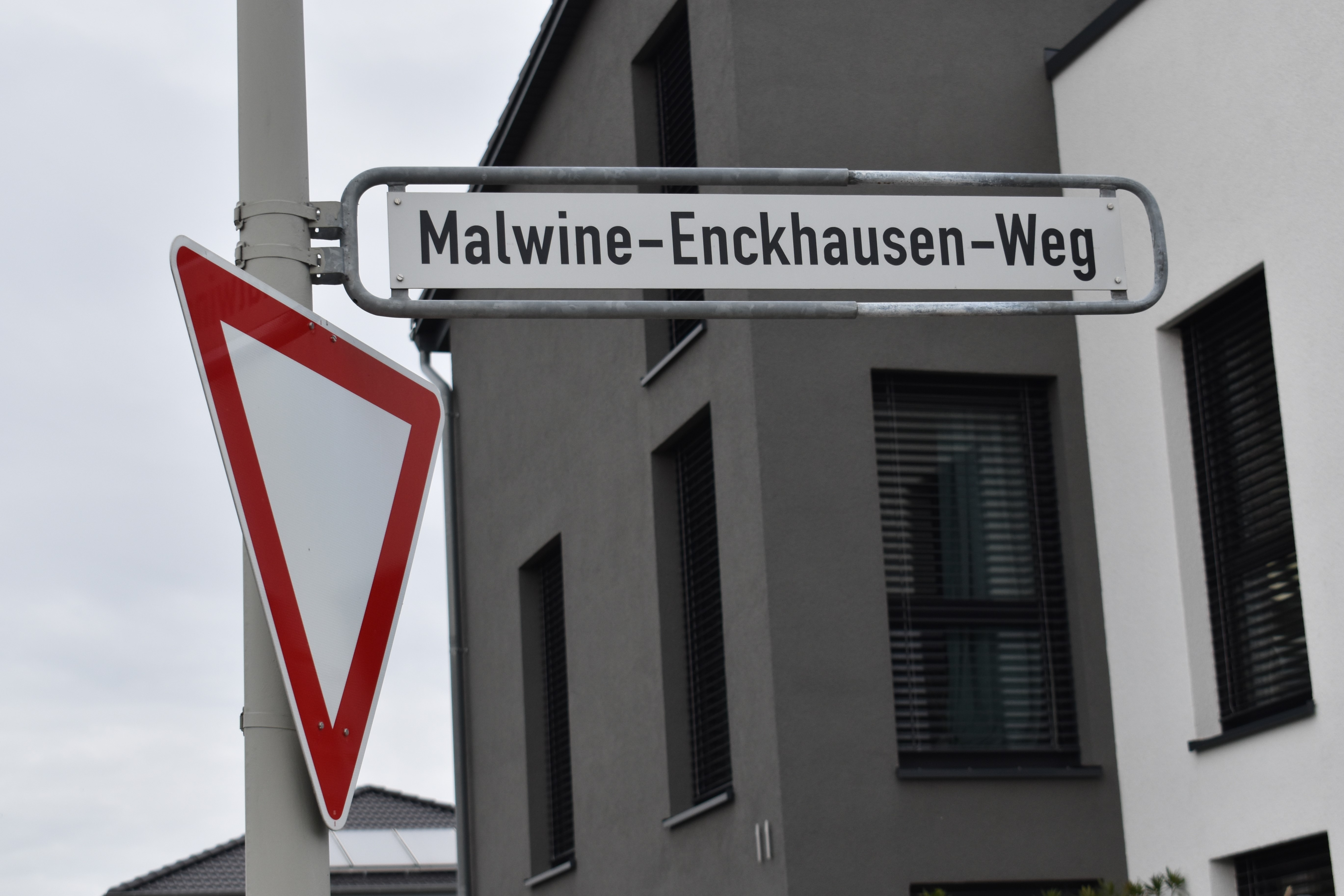
Street sign of the Malwine-Enckhausen-Weg in Hanover

Enckhausen lived in Hanover at the end of the 19th century. She was able to publish her first novella, Tagebücher einer Schauspielerin (English translation: The Diaries of an Actress), in a magazine published in Leipzig. The same magazine subsequently became the medium for other works by the artist.

In 1883, Malwine Enckhausen was one of around 500 applicants for her novel A Lost Life with first prize in a competition "for the best literary work".

In 2011, the street Malwine-Enckhausen-Weg in Hanover-Wettbergen was named after the artist.

== Bibliography ==
- Tagebücher einer Schauspielerin, novela
- Ein verlorenes Leben, novela
- Chronika. five historical narratives; includes: Um Krone und Leben, Der Bildhauer von Nürnberg, Hans Sachs, Licht und Schatten eines Künstlerlebens, Ein erloschener Stern, im * Schuber von Georg Schaefer, Druck R. Zacharias (Magdeburg), Buchornamentik im Jugendstil, Stuttgart: Paul Unterborn Verlag für Deutsches Schrifttum, 1905
- Meister Helfft. novel (= Weicherts Wochen-Bibliothek, volume 276), Berlin: Weichert, [1912]
- Kunst und Leben / L. Herzog (= Weicherts Wochen-Bibliothek, volume 283), Berlin: Weichert, [1913]
- Frauenehre / M. Enckhausen, (= Das Gute Buch, volume 3), Berlin: Weichert, [1914]
- Hilde. Roman / M. Enckhausen, (= Das Gute Buch, volume 16), Berlin: Weichert, [1914]
- Die Ehe der Tragödin. Novel / by L. Herzog, (= Bibliothek zeitgenössischer Erzähler, Bd. 25), Berlin: Weichert, [1916]
- Eva. Novel / by Malvine Enckhausen (= Bibliothek zeitgenössischer Erzähler, Bd. 27), Berlin: Weichert, [1916]
- Nur ein Bauernsohn. Roman / M. Enckhausen (= Weicherts 25 Pfennig-Bibliothek, Bd. 302), Berlin: Weichert, [1917]
- Das alte Lied. Roman / L. Herzog
  - new print (= Neue Rekord-Bibliothek, volume 17), Berlin: Weichert, [1937]
