= Römstedt =

- Municipality
- Coat of arms

- Location of Römstedt within Uelzen district
- Interactive map of Römstedt
- Location within Germany Location within Lower Saxony
- Coordinates: 53°06′N 10°36′E
- Country: Germany
- State: Lower Saxony
- District: Uelzen
- Municipal assoc.: Bevensen-Ebstorf
- Subdivisions: 5

Government
  - Mayor: Bernd Lüders

Area
  - Total: 18.97 km^{2} (7.32 sq mi)
- Elevation: 54 m (177 ft)

Population (2025-12-31)
  - Total: 769
  - Density: 40.5/km^{2} (105/sq mi)
- Time zone: UTC+01:00 (CET)
  - Summer (DST): UTC+02:00 (CEST)
- Postal codes: 29591
- Dialling codes: 05821
- Vehicle registration: UE

Römstedt is a municipality in the district of Uelzen, in Lower Saxony, Germany.
