= Barum, Uelzen =

Barum
- Municipality
- Location of Barum within Uelzen district
- Interactive map of Barum
- Location within Germany Location within Lower Saxony
- Coordinates: 53°03′01″N 10°30′58″E
- Country: Germany
- State: Lower Saxony
- District: Uelzen
- Municipal assoc.: Bevensen-Ebstorf
- Subdivisions: 3

Government
  - Mayor: Jürgen Freiherr von Hodenberg

Area
  - Total: 22.33 km^{2} (8.62 sq mi)
- Elevation: 60 m (200 ft)

Population (2025-12-31)
  - Total: 758
  - Density: 33.9/km^{2} (87.9/sq mi)
- Time zone: UTC+01:00 (CET)
  - Summer (DST): UTC+02:00 (CEST)
- Postal codes: 29576
- Dialling codes: 05806
- Vehicle registration: UE
- Website: www.barum-gemeinde.de

Barum (German pronunciation: [ˈbaːʁʊm]) is a municipality in the district of Uelzen, in Lower Saxony, Germany.
