= Jelmstorf =

- Municipality
- Coat of arms

- Location of Jelmstorf within Uelzen district
- Interactive map of Jelmstorf
- Location within Germany Location within Lower Saxony
- Coordinates: 53°06′08″N 10°31′29″E
- Country: Germany
- State: Lower Saxony
- District: Uelzen
- Municipal assoc.: Bevensen-Ebstorf
- Subdivisions: 3

Government
  - Mayor: Norbert Brandl (CDU)

Area
  - Total: 13.71 km^{2} (5.29 sq mi)
- Elevation: 44 m (144 ft)

Population (2025-12-31)
  - Total: 768
  - Density: 56.0/km^{2} (145/sq mi)
- Time zone: UTC+01:00 (CET)
  - Summer (DST): UTC+02:00 (CEST)
- Postal codes: 29585
- Dialling codes: 05821
- Vehicle registration: UE

Jelmstorf is a municipality in the district of Uelzen, in Lower Saxony, Germany.
