= Heinrich Enckhausen =

German organist and composer (1799–1885)

Heinrich Friedrich Enckhausen (also spelled Enkhausen, Enghausen and Enghusen, August 28, 1799 – January 15, 1885) was a German pianist, organist, horn player, composer and singing teacher.

== Life and career ==
Born in Celle, Heinrich Friedrich Enckhausen began studying music with his father, also named Heinrich Friedrich Enckhausen, that town's last town council musician. In 1816 he was accepted into the music band of the cuirassiers in Celle, where he played violin, flute, clarinet, cello and pianoforte. In 1826 he moved to Berlin and studied piano and composition with Aloys Schmitt. Enckhausen went to the court of Hanover with Schmitt when he (Schmitt) was appointed court organist there. Enckhausen played there from 1827 to 1832 as a horn player in the court orchestra. After Schmitt's departure from Hanover, Enckhausen directed the singing academy. In 1833 he became a singing teacher at the teachers' college. In 1839 he finally received the position of organist at the Castle Church in Hanover, which he held until his retirement. From 1845 he worked as a singing teacher at the Lyceum in Hanover.

On June 16, 1836, Enckhausem became a member of the St. Johannis Free Mason's Lodge Zur Ceder.

Enckhausen's daughter Malwine Enckhausen, who later became a writer, was born in Hanover on October 29, 1843.

Enckhausen wrote the opera Der Savoyard in Hanover in 1832. He also wrote religious music. Furthermore, he composed around 70 pieces for military band, piano and solo voices. He died in Hannover, aged 85.
