= Schwienau =

- Municipality
- Coat of arms

- Location of Schwienau within Uelzen district
- Interactive map of Schwienau
- Location within Germany Location within Lower Saxony
- Coordinates: 53°00′N 10°27′E
- Country: Germany
- State: Lower Saxony
- District: Uelzen
- Municipal assoc.: Bevensen-Ebstorf
- Subdivisions: 4

Government
  - Mayor: Gustav Müller (SPD)

Area
  - Total: 31.27 km^{2} (12.07 sq mi)
- Elevation: 78 m (256 ft)

Population (2025-12-31)
  - Total: 662
  - Density: 21.2/km^{2} (54.8/sq mi)
- Time zone: UTC+01:00 (CET)
  - Summer (DST): UTC+02:00 (CEST)
- Postal codes: 29593
- Dialling codes: 05822
- Vehicle registration: UE

Schwienau is a municipality in the district of Uelzen, in Lower Saxony, Germany.
