= Altenmedingen =

- Municipality
- Coat of arms

- Location of Altenmedingen within Uelzen district
- Interactive map of Altenmedingen
- Location within Germany Location within Lower Saxony
- Coordinates: 53°07′58″N 10°36′16″E
- Country: Germany
- State: Lower Saxony
- District: Uelzen
- Municipal assoc.: Bevensen-Ebstorf
- Subdivisions: 9

Government
  - Mayor: Werner Marquard (CDU)

Area
  - Total: 48.09 km^{2} (18.57 sq mi)
- Elevation: 54 m (177 ft)

Population (2025-12-31)
  - Total: 1,427
  - Density: 29.67/km^{2} (76.85/sq mi)
- Time zone: UTC+01:00 (CET)
  - Summer (DST): UTC+02:00 (CEST)
- Postal codes: 29575
- Dialling codes: 05807
- Vehicle registration: UE
- Website: www.altenmedingen.de

Altenmedingen is a municipality in the district of Uelzen, in Lower Saxony, Germany.
