= Rätzlingen, Lower Saxony =

Rätzlingen
- Municipality
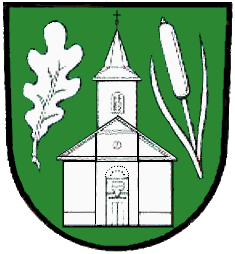
- Coat of arms

- Location of Rätzlingen within Uelzen district
- Interactive map of Rätzlingen
- Location within Germany Location within Lower Saxony
- Coordinates: 52°59′N 10°41′E
- Country: Germany
- State: Lower Saxony
- District: Uelzen
- Municipal assoc.: Rosche

Government
  - Mayor: Harald Dammann

Area
  - Total: 8.54 km^{2} (3.30 sq mi)
- Elevation: 74 m (243 ft)

Population (2025-12-31)
  - Total: 467
  - Density: 54.7/km^{2} (142/sq mi)
- Time zone: UTC+01:00 (CET)
  - Summer (DST): UTC+02:00 (CEST)
- Postal codes: 29590
- Dialling codes: 05804
- Vehicle registration: UE

Rätzlingen (German pronunciation: [ˈʁɛtslɪŋən]) is a municipality in the district of Uelzen, in Lower Saxony, Germany.
