= Himbergen =

- Municipality
- Coat of arms

- Location of Himbergen within Uelzen district
- Interactive map of Himbergen
- Location within Germany Location within Lower Saxony
- Coordinates: 53°06′N 10°44′E
- Country: Germany
- State: Lower Saxony
- District: Uelzen
- Municipal assoc.: Bevensen-Ebstorf
- Subdivisions: 10

Government
  - Mayor: Jürgen Hinrichs

Area
  - Total: 39.46 km^{2} (15.24 sq mi)
- Elevation: 56 m (184 ft)

Population (2025-12-31)
  - Total: 1,681
  - Density: 42.60/km^{2} (110.3/sq mi)
- Time zone: UTC+01:00 (CET)
  - Summer (DST): UTC+02:00 (CEST)
- Postal codes: 29584
- Dialling codes: 05828
- Vehicle registration: UE
- Website: www.himbergen.de

Himbergen is a municipality in the district of Uelzen, in Lower Saxony, Germany.

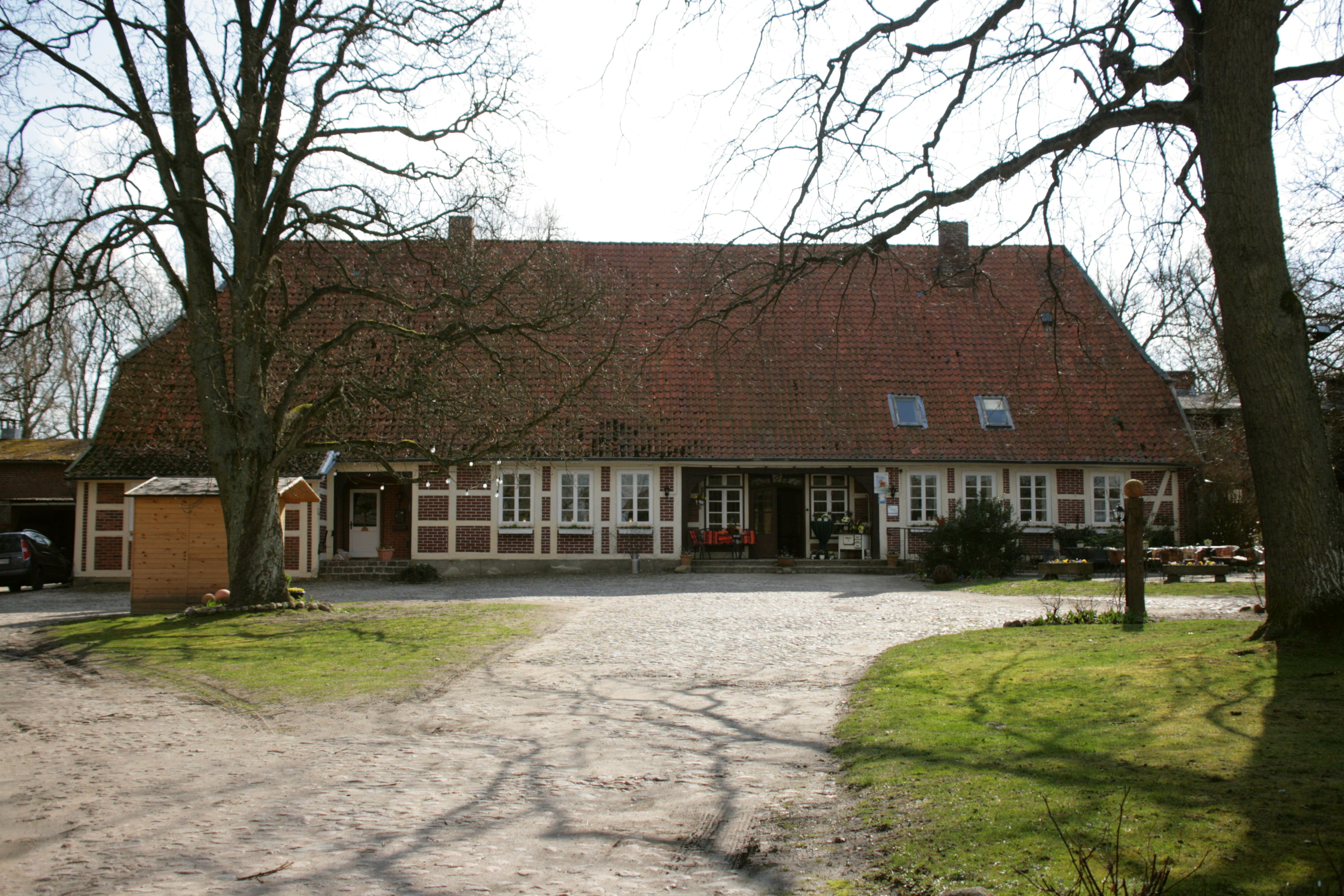
Himbergen Rohrstorf - Eichenhof Hotel and restaurant
