= Suderburg =

- Municipality
- Coat of arms

- Location of Suderburg within Uelzen district
- Interactive map of Suderburg
- Location within Germany Location within Lower Saxony
- Coordinates: 52°54′2.581″N 10°26′20.72″E
- Country: Germany
- State: Lower Saxony
- District: Uelzen
- Municipal assoc.: Suderburg
- Subdivisions: 7

Government
  - Mayor: Dagmar Hillmer (CDU)

Area
  - Total: 129.48 km^{2} (49.99 sq mi)
- Elevation: 57 m (187 ft)

Population (2025-12-31)
  - Total: 4,374
  - Density: 33.78/km^{2} (87.49/sq mi)
- Time zone: UTC+01:00 (CET)
  - Summer (DST): UTC+02:00 (CEST)
- Postal codes: 29556
- Dialling codes: 05826
- Vehicle registration: UE
- Website: www.suderburg.de

Suderburg is a municipality in the district of Uelzen, in Lower Saxony, Germany. It is situated approximately 11 km southwest of Uelzen.

Suderburg is also the seat of the Samtgemeinde ("collective municipality") Suderburg.

== Municipal divisions ==
The parish of Suderburg consists of Suderburg itself and the following villages that had been independent until the municipal reform in 1972: Bahnsen, Böddenstedt, Hamerstorf, Hösseringen, Holxen and Räber.

== History ==
The first known written instance of the name was as Sutherburg in 1004.

In 1847, the railway line Celle–Uelzen–Lüneburg–Harburg–Wilhelmsburg was opened, and Suderburg railway station was opened in 1850 and extended in 1859.

In 1957, the villages Graulingen, Oldendorf I and Suderburg were merged into Suderburg.

== Notable people ==
- Sophus Schmidt (1792–1841), Hanoveran liberation fighter, bailiff in Bleckede and landowner in Suderburg
- Heinrich Christoph Wilhelm Hillmer (1831–1916), building master
- Karl Hillmer (1869–1944), director of the Wiesenbauschule
- Carsten Kadach (born 1964), former FIFA assistant

== Sources ==
The text includes a translation of part of the German Wikipedia article.
