= Stederau =

River in Germany

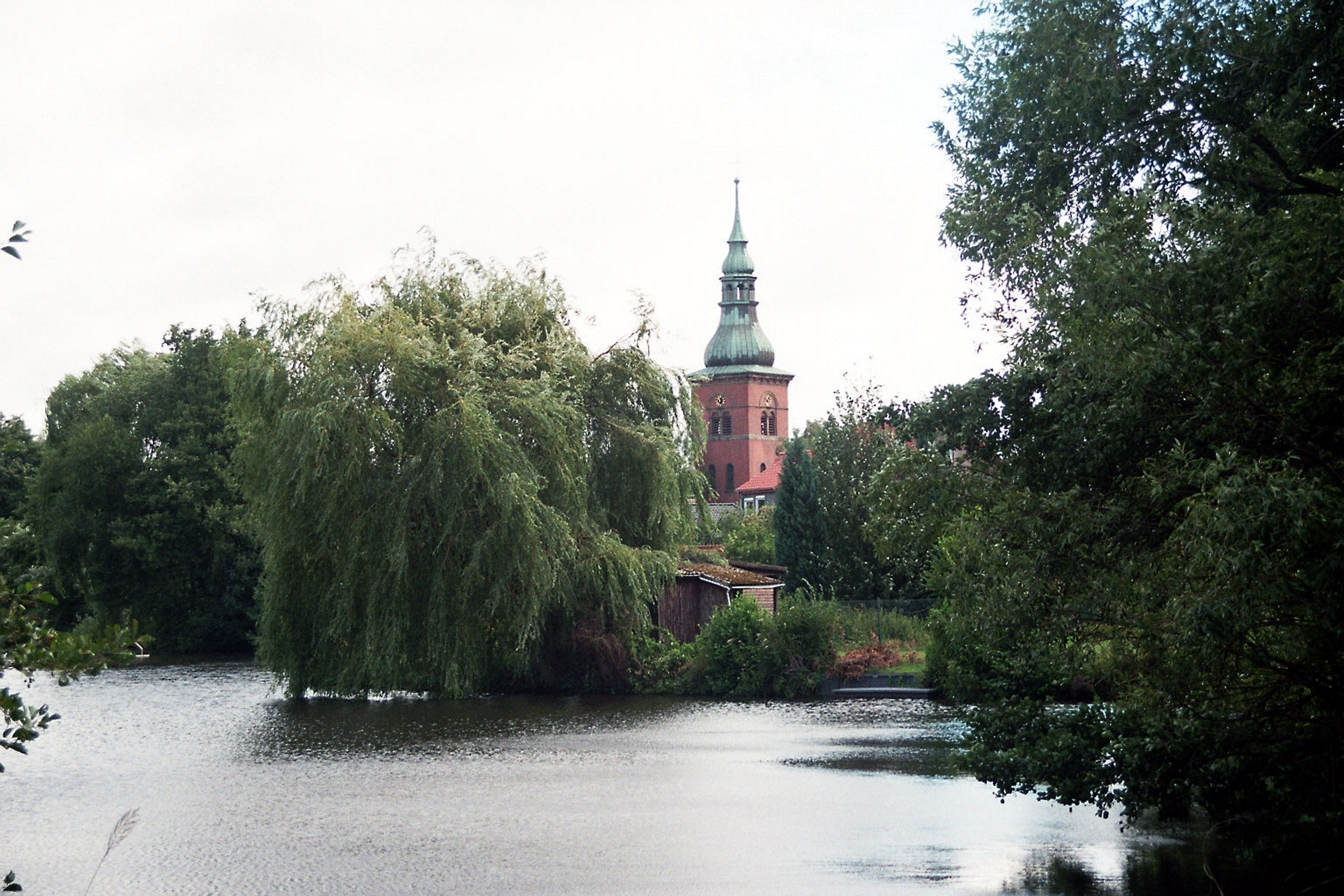

Location
- Country: Germany
- State: Lower Saxony

Physical characteristics
- Mouth
  - location: Ilmenau
  - coordinates: 52°56′52″N 10°33′13″E
- Length: 35.9 km (22.3 mi)
- Basin size: 350 km^{2} (140 sq mi)

Basin features
- Progression: Ilmenau→ Elbe→ North Sea

Stederau is a river of Lower Saxony, Germany. It flows into the Ilmenau south of Uelzen.

== See also ==
- List of rivers of Lower Saxony
