= Erika Suderburg =

American artist (born 1959)

Erika Suderburg is a contemporary American filmmaker and writer.

== Early life ==
Suderburg was born in 1959 in Minneapolis, Minnesota.

== Education ==
From 1975 to 1977, Suderburg attended the UNC North Carolina School of the Arts, in Theater Design and Production. Afterwards, she attended the University of North Carolina at Chapel Hill in Film and Television, then earned her B.F.A. at Minneapolis College of Art and Design in 1981 in media arts. In 1984, she received her M.F.A. degree from the University of California, San Diego.

== Career ==
Towards the beginning of her career, Suderburg experimented with dance and performance art. She moved from the midwest to San Diego to study experimental film with Jean-Pierre Gorin and Michel de Certeau and later to Los Angeles. Rather than writing out a script, Suderburg collects footage and still images, then pieces them together. Topography is also a recurring theme in her work. Suderburg does not consider film a strictly linear medium but a form of hypermedia, embracing both screen and viewer.

In 2006, Suderburg created the short film Strip. Her feature-length work, Decline and Fall (2007), juxtaposes footage of bombings, aerial surveillance, and protests to draw meaning. It includes World War II archival footage, more recent peace protests in Rome and Los Angeles, and imagery drawn from everyday life.

Suderburg is the editor of Space, Site, Intervention: Situating Installation Art, (2000), a selection of essays on contemporary installation and related forms of site-specific art. She is also the co-editor of Resolutions: Contemporary Video Practices (1996) and Resolutions 3: Global Networks of Video (2012). Resolutions: Contemporary Video Practices brings together critical writings that address the role of independent video in a wide array of countries and cultures. It examines new complications in the medium's site-specificity, given the increase of video sharing and distribution outside the movie theater setting.

Suderburg has taught at Otis College of Art and Design, the California Institute of the Arts, and Pasadena's Art Center College of Design. As of 2013, she is a professor at the University of California, Riverside.

=== Exhibitions ===
Suderburg's work was chosen for the Fukai International Video Biennale in Japan and the 2009 La Biennale de Montréal in Canada. Her films have been screened in New York, California, Japan, Korea, and Europe. Her work has been exhibitedat MOCA, MOMA, in International Film Festivals and at many institutions, including the School of the Visual Arts in New York, The American Academy in Rome, CalArts, FilmForum and USC School of Cinema and Television. In 2012, two of her feature films, Somatography (2000) and Decline and Fall (2007), were screened as part of the Post Pacific Standard Time exhibition at the UCR Sweeney Art Gallery.

=== Publications ===
(authored)

- "Cold Luminescence and Western In(Sight): Dark Rooms and Wet Lawns" in Pacific Standard Time: Exchange and Evolution. Nancy Buchanan and Kathy Rae Huffman, eds., Long Beach Museum of Art and Getty Museum, 2011.
- "Pat O'Neill and the Western Precipice: An Elemental Table of Objects and the Events That Enfold Them" in Views from Lookout Mountain, Julie Lazar, ed. Berlin: Steidl Verlag and the Santa Monica Museum of Art, 2004.
- "Welcome to the Epidemic." Xtra, Los Angeles, 2004.
- "Working Like A Homosexual" in Journal of the History of Sexuality, San Francisco State University: Department of History, vol. 12, no. 4, October 2003.

(edited)

- Suderburg, Erika (ed.). Space, Site, Intervention: Situating Installation Art. University of Minnesota Press, 2000.
- Ma, Ming-Yuen S., and Erika Suderburg (eds.). Resolutions 3: Global Networks of Video. University of Minnesota Press, 2012.
- Renov, Michael, and Erika Suderburg (eds.). Resolutions: Contemporary Video Practices. University of Minnesota Press, 1995.
