= Eimke =

- Municipality
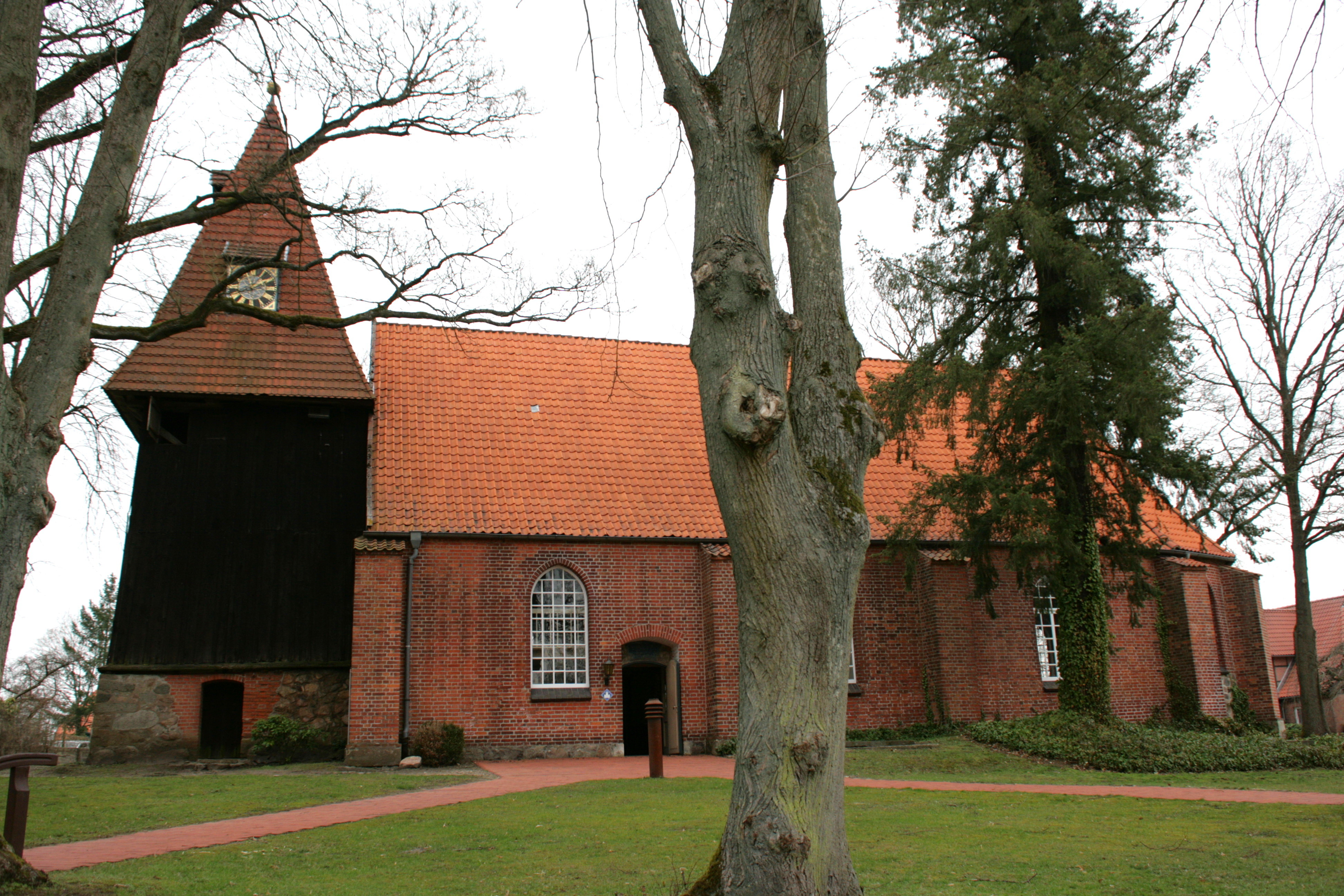
- Church in Eimke

- Coat of arms

- Location of Eimke within Uelzen district
- Interactive map of Eimke
- Location within Germany Location within Lower Saxony
- Coordinates: 52°58′N 10°19′E
- Country: Germany
- State: Lower Saxony
- District: Uelzen
- Municipal assoc.: Suderburg
- Subdivisions: 4

Government
  - Mayor: Dirk-Walter Amtsfeld (CDU)

Area
  - Total: 82.83 km^{2} (31.98 sq mi)
- Elevation: 64 m (210 ft)

Population (2025-12-31)
  - Total: 847
  - Density: 10.2/km^{2} (26.5/sq mi)
- Time zone: UTC+01:00 (CET)
  - Summer (DST): UTC+02:00 (CEST)
- Postal codes: 29578
- Dialling codes: 05873
- Vehicle registration: UE
- Website: www.eimke.de

Eimke is a municipality in the district of Uelzen, in Lower Saxony, Germany.
