= Gerdau (surname) =

Gerdau is a surname. Notable people with the surname include:

- André Bier Gerdau Johannpeter (born 1963), Brazilian businessman and equestrian
- Jorge Gerdau Johannpeter (born 1936), Brazilian businessman and equestrian
- Mats Gerdau (born 1964), Swedish politician
- Willi Gerdau (1929–2011), German footballer
