= Bad Bevensen =

- Town
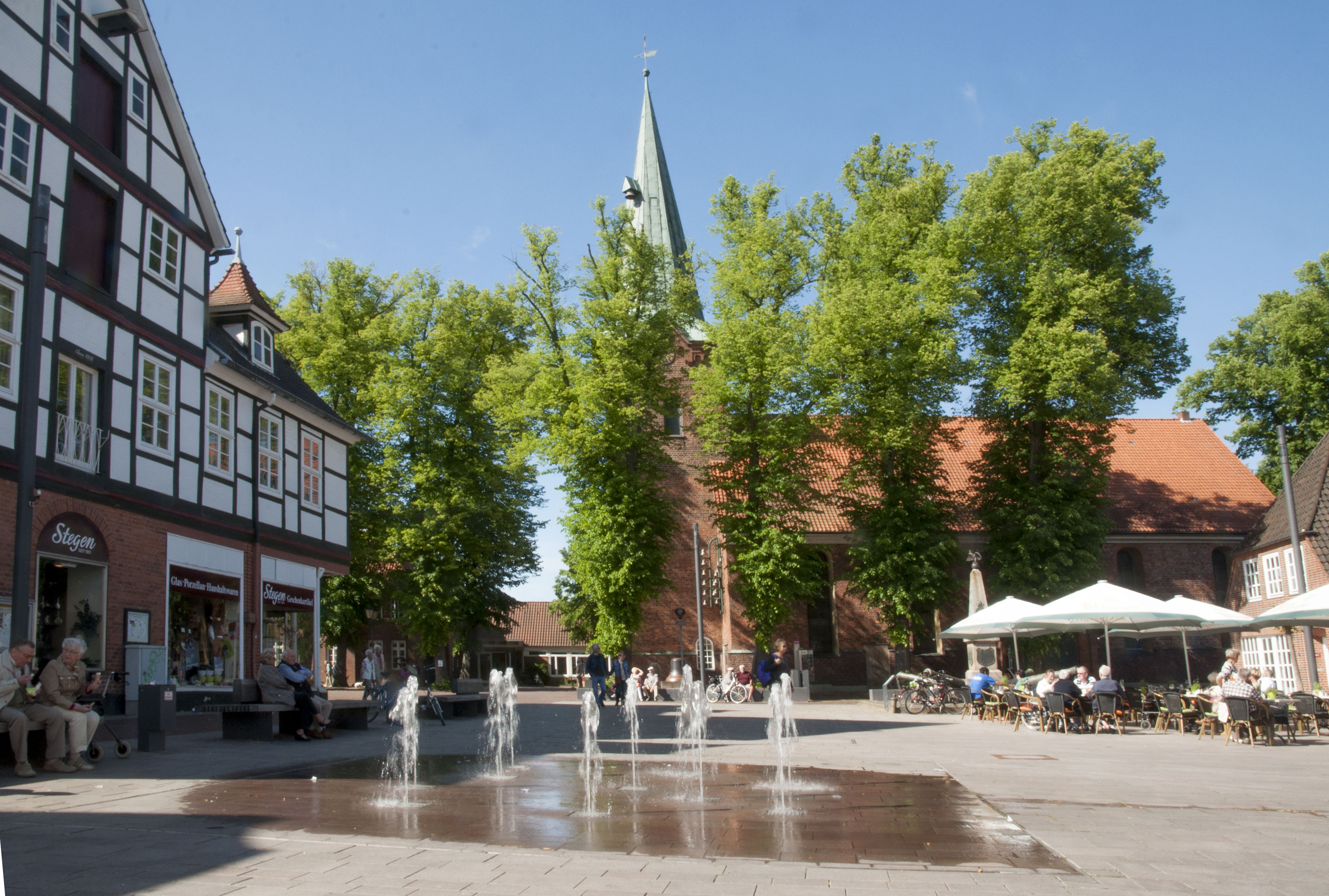
- Market Square with the Church of the Three Kings

- Coat of arms

- Location of Bad Bevensen within Uelzen district
- Interactive map of Bad Bevensen
- Location within Germany Location within Lower Saxony
- Coordinates: 53°04′45″N 10°35′00″E
- Country: Germany
- State: Lower Saxony
- District: Uelzen
- Municipal assoc.: Bevensen-Ebstorf

Government
  - Mayor: Gabriele Meyer (Greens)

Area
  - Total: 48.36 km^{2} (18.67 sq mi)
- Elevation: 36 m (118 ft)

Population (2025-12-31)
  - Total: 9,504
  - Density: 196.5/km^{2} (509.0/sq mi)
- Time zone: UTC+01:00 (CET)
  - Summer (DST): UTC+02:00 (CEST)
- Postal codes: 29549
- Dialling codes: 05821
- Vehicle registration: UE
- Website: www.bad-bevensen.de

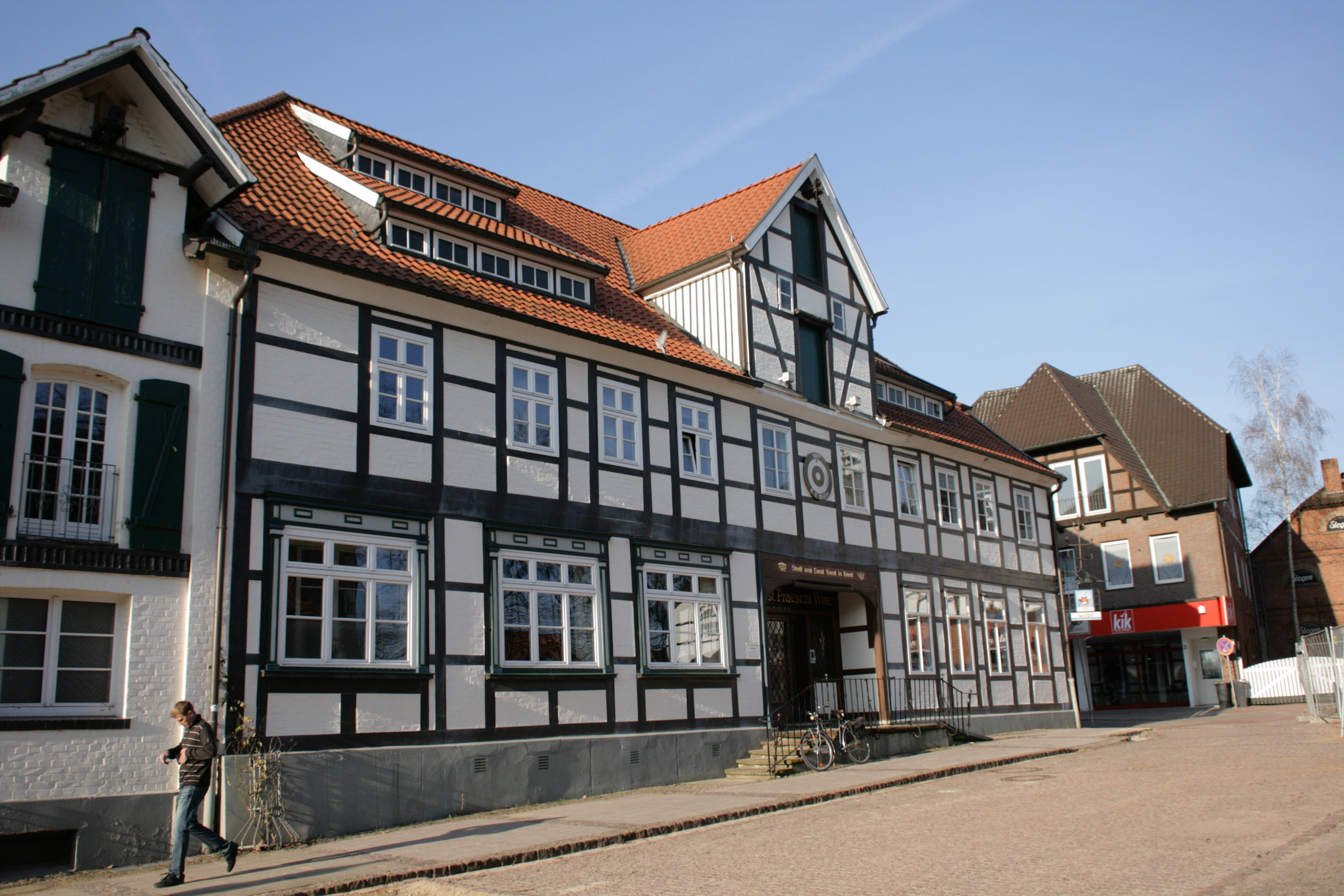
Timber-framed house on Brückenstraße

Bad Bevensen (German pronunciation: [baːt ˈbeːvn̩zn̩]; Low German: Bämsen) is a town in the north of the district Uelzen in Lower Saxony, Germany. It is situated to the east of the Lüneburg Heath (Lüneburger Heide). The Ilmenau river, a tributary of the Elbe, flows through Bad Bevensen. Bad Bevensen is a well-known spa town.

Bad Bevensen is the seat of the Samtgemeinde ("collective municipality") Bevensen-Ebstorf.

Incorporated into the municipality are the villages of Gollern, Groß Hesebeck, Jastorf, Klein Bünstorf, Klein Hesebeck, Medingen, Röbbel, Sasendorf and Seedorf. Jastorf is situated some 3 kilometres (2 miles) south of the town center. It is the site of an Iron Age cemetery which gave the name of the Jastorf culture.

In the run-up to the G20 summit in 2017, left-wing extremists set a fire in the town.

== International relations ==
=== Twin towns – Sister cities ===
Bad Bevensen is twinned with:

- Chojnice Poland

== Notable people ==
- Ilse Falk (born 1943), politician and Member of Parliament (CDU)
- Ulrich Sinn (born 1945), Professor of Classical Archaeology
- Joachim Eigenherr (born 1947), athlete
- Volker Bescht (born 1951), Brigadier General of the Bundeswehr
- Heinrich Lange (born 1955), Vice Admiral of the German navy

== See also ==
- Gustav Stresemann Institute
