= Ilmenau (river) =

River in Germany

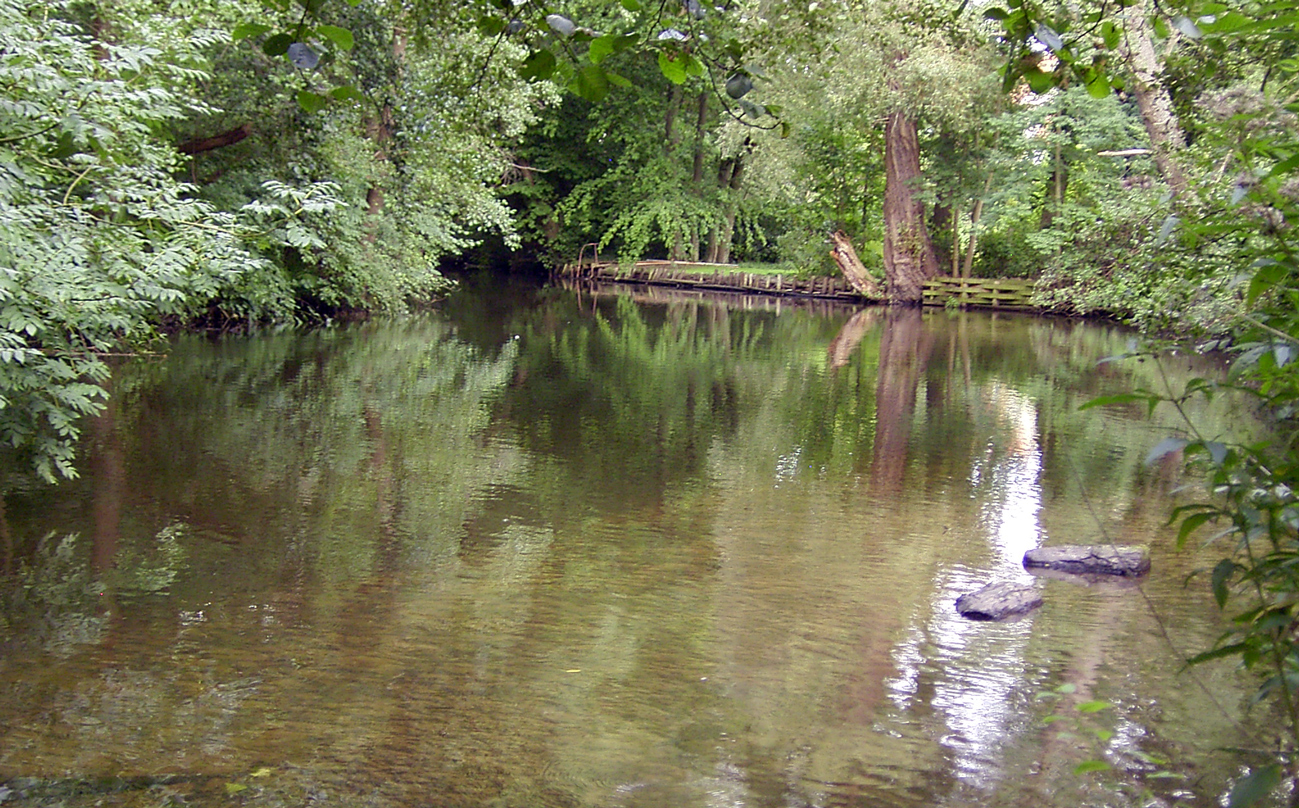
- The Ilmenau near Uelzen

Location
- Country: Germany
- State: Lower Saxony
- Reference no.: DE: 594

Physical characteristics
- Source
  - location: source: confluence of the Gerdau and Stederau in Veerßen (a district of Uelzen)
  - coordinates: 52°56′52″N 10°33′13″E
  - elevation: 35 m above sea level (NN) (Gerdau 70 m above NN, Stederau 66 m above NN)
- Mouth
  - location: near Hoopte (a district of Winsen (Luhe)), into the Elbe
  - coordinates: 53°23′44″N 10°10′25″E
  - elevation: 2 m above sea level (NN)
- Length: 121.5 km (75.5 mi)
- Basin size: 2,850 km^{2} (1,100 sq mi)
- Discharge
  - average: 17.7 m^{3}/s (630 cu ft/s)

Basin features
- Progression: Elbe→ North Sea
- Landmarks: Large towns: Uelzen, Lüneburg, Winsen (Luhe); Small towns: Bad Bevensen, Bardowick; Villages: Emmendorf, Medingen, Bienenbüttel, Melbeck, Deutsch Evern, Wittorf, Fahrenholz, Mover (both districts of Drage), Tönnhausen, Stöckte, Hoopte
- Tributaries
  - left: Bienenbütteler Mühlenbach, Barnstedt Melbecker Bach, Hasenburger Mühlenbach, Luhe
  - right: Wipperau, Röbbelbach, Wohbeck, Vierenbach, Dieksbach, Neetze Canal, Neetze, Ilau-Schneegraben
- Navigable: 28.84 km (17.92 mi)

Ilmenau (German pronunciation: [ˈɪlmənaʊ]) is a river south of Hamburg, in Lower Saxony, Germany.

The Ilmenau originates in the Lüneburg Heath, south of Uelzen, at the confluence of the rivers Gerdau and Stederau in Veerßen, a district of Uelzen. It is a left tributary of the Elbe near Winsen (Luhe).

The Ilmenau is 121 kilometres (75 mi) long, including its source river Stederau. The largest towns along the Ilmenau are Uelzen and Lüneburg. The city Ilmenau in Thuringia is not along the river Ilmenau but along the river Ilm. The river is navigable from Lüneburg, but almost exclusively used by excursion ships. Above Lüneburg, the river is popular with canoeists.

== See also ==
- List of rivers of Lower Saxony
