= Natendorf =

- Municipality
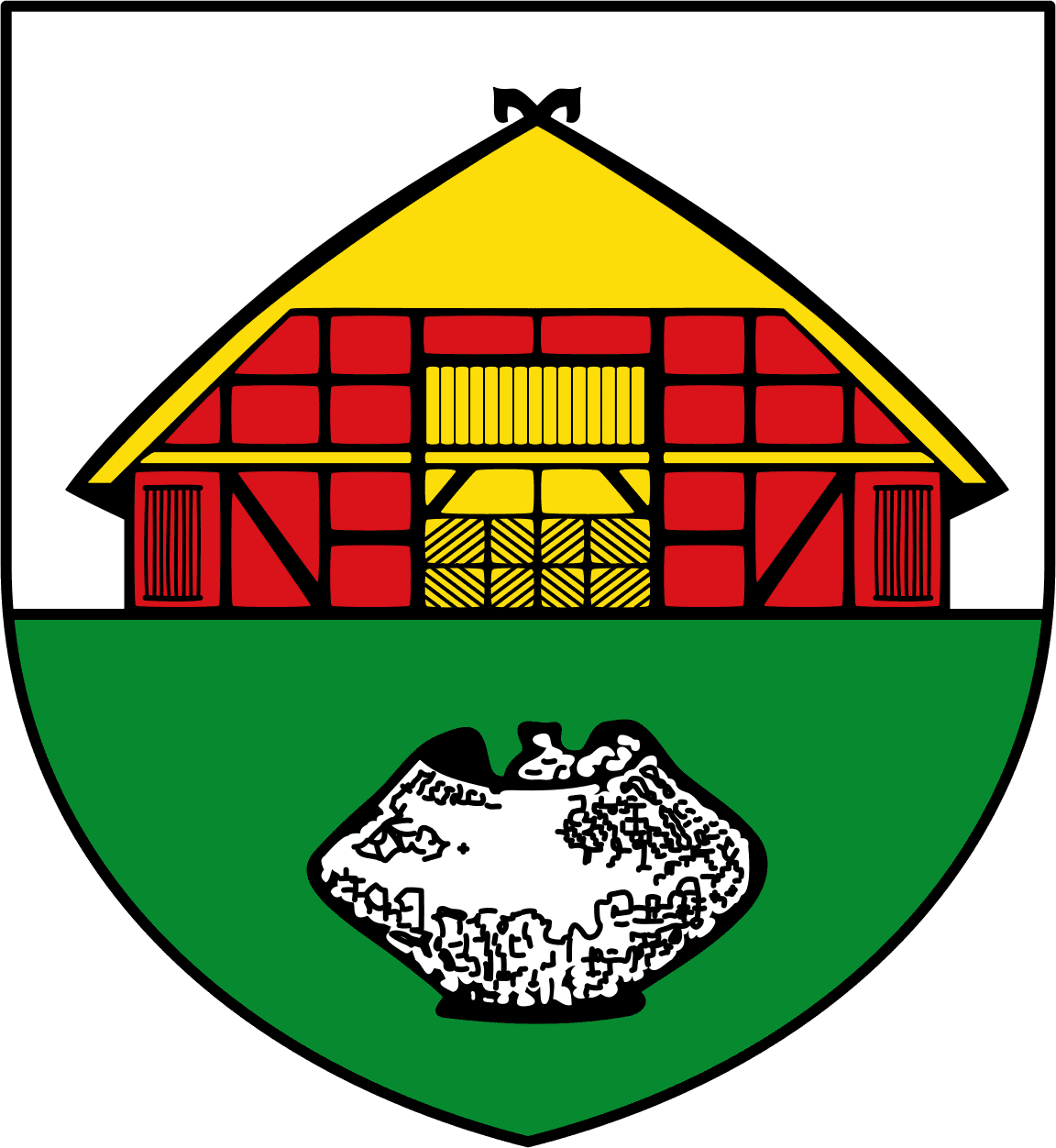
- Coat of arms

- Location of Natendorf within Uelzen district
- Interactive map of Natendorf
- Location within Germany Location within Lower Saxony
- Coordinates: 53°05′N 10°28′E
- Country: Germany
- State: Lower Saxony
- District: Uelzen
- Municipal assoc.: Bevensen-Ebstorf
- Subdivisions: 8

Government
  - Mayor: Hans Wilhelm Schröder

Area
  - Total: 34.44 km^{2} (13.30 sq mi)
- Elevation: 56 m (184 ft)

Population (2025-12-31)
  - Total: 669
  - Density: 19.4/km^{2} (50.3/sq mi)
- Time zone: UTC+01:00 (CET)
  - Summer (DST): UTC+02:00 (CEST)
- Postal codes: 29587
- Dialling codes: 05806
- Vehicle registration: UE
- Website: www.natendorf.de

Natendorf is a municipality in the district of Uelzen, in Lower Saxony, Germany.
