= Hanstedt, Uelzen =

Hanstedt
- Municipality
- Coat of arms

- Location of Hanstedt within Uelzen district
- Interactive map of Hanstedt
- Location within Germany Location within Lower Saxony
- Coordinates: 53°03′N 10°22′E
- Country: Germany
- State: Lower Saxony
- District: Uelzen
- Municipal assoc.: Bevensen-Ebstorf
- Subdivisions: 9

Government
  - Mayor: Rainer Bockelmann (SPD)

Area
  - Total: 55.31 km^{2} (21.36 sq mi)
- Elevation: 61 m (200 ft)

Population (2025-12-31)
  - Total: 913
  - Density: 16.5/km^{2} (42.8/sq mi)
- Time zone: UTC+01:00 (CET)
  - Summer (DST): UTC+02:00 (CEST)
- Postal codes: 29582
- Dialling codes: 05822
- Vehicle registration: UE

Hanstedt is a municipality in the district of Uelzen, in Lower Saxony, Germany.
