= Weste, Lower Saxony =

Weste
- Municipality
- Coat of arms

- Location of Weste within Uelzen district
- Interactive map of Weste
- Location within Germany Location within Lower Saxony
- Coordinates: 53°4′N 10°42′E
- Country: Germany
- State: Lower Saxony
- District: Uelzen
- Municipal assoc.: Bevensen-Ebstorf
- Subdivisions: 7

Government
  - Mayor: Achim Ritzer (CDU)

Area
  - Total: 25.45 km^{2} (9.83 sq mi)
- Elevation: 59 m (194 ft)

Population (2025-12-31)
  - Total: 901
  - Density: 35.4/km^{2} (91.7/sq mi)
- Time zone: UTC+01:00 (CET)
  - Summer (DST): UTC+02:00 (CEST)
- Postal codes: 29599
- Dialling codes: 05828
- Vehicle registration: UE

Weste (German pronunciation: [ˈvɛstə]) is a municipality in the district of Uelzen, in Lower Saxony, Germany.
