= Gerdau, Germany =

Gerdau
- Municipality
- Coat of arms

- Location of Gerdau within Uelzen district
- Interactive map of Gerdau
- Location within Germany Location within Lower Saxony
- Coordinates: 52°58′N 10°25′E
- Country: Germany
- State: Lower Saxony
- District: Uelzen
- Municipal assoc.: Suderburg
- Subdivisions: 6

Government
  - Mayor: Otto Schröder (CDU)

Area
  - Total: 37.97 km^{2} (14.66 sq mi)
- Elevation: 52 m (171 ft)

Population (2025-12-31)
  - Total: 1,397
  - Density: 36.79/km^{2} (95.29/sq mi)
- Time zone: UTC+01:00 (CET)
  - Summer (DST): UTC+02:00 (CEST)
- Postal codes: 29581
- Dialling codes: 05808
- Vehicle registration: UE
- Website: www.gerdau.de

Gerdau is a municipality in the district of Uelzen, in Lower Saxony, Germany.
