= Emmendorf =

- Municipality
- Coat of arms

- Location of Emmendorf within Uelzen district
- Interactive map of Emmendorf
- Location within Germany Location within Lower Saxony
- Coordinates: 53°01′N 10°34′E
- Country: Germany
- State: Lower Saxony
- District: Uelzen
- Municipal assoc.: Bevensen-Ebstorf
- Subdivisions: 4

Government
  - Mayor: Uwe Silbermann (CDU)

Area
  - Total: 10.88 km^{2} (4.20 sq mi)
- Elevation: 52 m (171 ft)

Population (2025-12-31)
  - Total: 737
  - Density: 67.7/km^{2} (175/sq mi)
- Time zone: UTC+01:00 (CET)
  - Summer (DST): UTC+02:00 (CEST)
- Postal codes: 29579
- Dialling codes: 05875
- Vehicle registration: UE

Emmendorf is a municipality in the district of Uelzen, in Lower Saxony, Germany.
