= Suderburg (Samtgemeinde) =

Municipality in Lower Saxony, Germany

- Samtgemeinde
- Location of Suderburg within Uelzen district
- Interactive map of Suderburg
- Location within Germany Location within Lower Saxony
- Coordinates: 52°54′N 10°28′E
- Country: Germany
- State: Lower Saxony
- District: Uelzen
- Seat: Suderburg
- Subdivisions: 3 municipalities

Area
  - Total: 251.03 km^{2} (96.92 sq mi)

Population (2025-12-31)
  - Total: 6,618
  - Density: 26.36/km^{2} (68.28/sq mi)
- Time zone: UTC+01:00 (CET)
  - Summer (DST): UTC+02:00 (CEST)
- Website: www.suderburg.de

Suderburg is a Samtgemeinde ("collective municipality") in the district of Uelzen, in Lower Saxony, Germany. Its seat is in the village Suderburg.

== Samtgemeinde divisions ==
The Samtgemeinde of Suderburg consists of 3 municipalities, each of them consisting with their respective following villages:

- Eimke
  - Dreilingen
  - Eimke
  - Ellerndorf
  - Wichtenbek
- Gerdau
  - Bargfeld
  - Barnsen
  - Bohlsen
  - Gerdau
  - Große Süstedt
  - Holthusen II
- Suderburg
  - Bahnsen
  - Böddenstedt
  - Hamerstorf
  - Holxen
  - Hösseringen
  - Räber
  - Suderburg
