= Wriedel =

- Municipality
- Flag Coat of arms

- Location of Wriedel within Uelzen district
- Interactive map of Wriedel
- Location within Germany Location within Lower Saxony
- Coordinates: 53°2′N 10°19′E
- Country: Germany
- State: Lower Saxony
- District: Uelzen
- Municipal assoc.: Bevensen-Ebstorf
- Subdivisions: 9

Government
  - Mayor: Peter-Uwe Breyer (CDU)

Area
  - Total: 104.15 km^{2} (40.21 sq mi)
- Elevation: 64 m (210 ft)

Population (2025-12-31)
  - Total: 2,235
  - Density: 21.46/km^{2} (55.58/sq mi)
- Time zone: UTC+01:00 (CET)
  - Summer (DST): UTC+02:00 (CEST)
- Postal codes: 29565
- Dialling codes: 05829
- Vehicle registration: UE
- Website: www.wriedel.de

Wriedel is a municipality in the district of Uelzen, in Lower Saxony, Germany.
