= Ebstorf =

Municipality in Lower Saxony, Germany

- Municipality
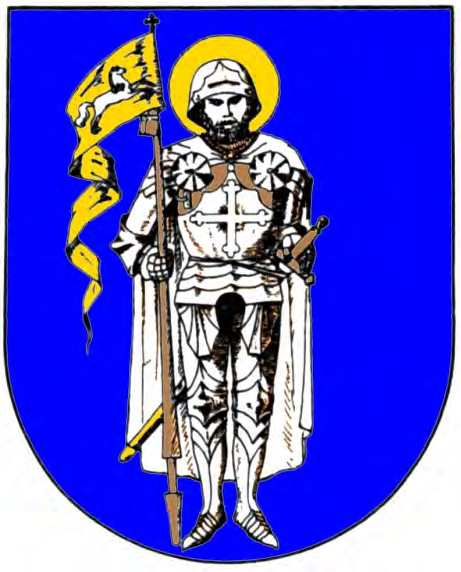
- Coat of arms

- Location of Ebstorf within Uelzen district
- Interactive map of Ebstorf
- Location within Germany Location within Lower Saxony
- Coordinates: 53°01′48″N 10°24′53″E
- Country: Germany
- State: Lower Saxony
- District: Uelzen
- Municipal assoc.: Bevensen-Ebstorf
- Subdivisions: 2

Government
  - Mayor: Uwe Beeken (CDU)

Area
  - Total: 27.26 km^{2} (10.53 sq mi)
- Elevation: 70 m (230 ft)

Population (2025-12-31)
  - Total: 5,268
  - Density: 193.3/km^{2} (500.5/sq mi)
- Time zone: UTC+01:00 (CET)
  - Summer (DST): UTC+02:00 (CEST)
- Postal codes: 29574
- Dialling codes: 05822
- Vehicle registration: UE
- Website: www.ebstorf.de

Ebstorf is a municipality in the district of Uelzen, in Lower Saxony, Germany. It is situated approximately 12 kilometres (7.5 mi) northwest of Uelzen, and 25 kilometres (16 mi) south of Lüneburg.

Ebstorf was the seat of the former Samtgemeinde (lit. 'collective municipality') Altes Amt Ebstorf.

== See also ==
- Ebstorf Map
