= Uelzen (district) =

District in Lower Saxony, Germany

Coordinates: 53°00′N 10°35′E

- District
- Flag Coat of arms
- Country: Germany
- State: Lower Saxony
- Capital: Uelzen

Government
  - District admin.: Heiko Blume (CDU)

Area
  - Total: 1,454 km^{2} (561 sq mi)

Population (31 December 2023)
  - Total: 91,832
  - Density: 63.16/km^{2} (163.6/sq mi)
- Time zone: UTC+01:00 (CET)
  - Summer (DST): UTC+02:00 (CEST)
- Vehicle registration: UE
- Website: landkreis-uelzen.de

Uelzen (German pronunciation: [ˈʏltsn̩]) is a district (Landkreis) in Lower Saxony, Germany. It is bounded by (from the south and clockwise) the districts of Gifhorn, Celle, Heidekreis, Lüneburg and Lüchow-Dannenberg, and by the state of Saxony-Anhalt (district of Altmarkkreis Salzwedel). The district capital is the town of Uelzen.

== History ==
From the Middle Ages on the region was part of the duchy of Brunswick-Lüneburg and its successor states.

== Geography ==
The district comprises the eastern part of the Lüneburg Heath (Lüneburger Heide). The Ilmenau river has its source in the district. From here it runs northwards to the town of Lüneburg. The countryside is flat and sparsely populated.

== Coat of arms ==
The coat of arms displays:

- three crosses, symbolising the monasteries of Ebstorf, Oldenstadt and Medingen
- the heraldic lion from the arms of Brunswick-Lüneburg

== Towns and municipalities ==
Clickable map of towns and municipalities in the district

Towns	Samtgemeinden
1. Uelzen; Free municipalities: 1. Bienenbüttel	1. Aue; 1. Bad Bodenteich; 2. Lüder; 3. Soltendieck; 4. Wrestedt^{1}	2. Bevensen-Ebstorf; 1. Altenmedingen; 2. Bad Bevensen^{1, 2}; 3. Barum; 4. Emmendorf; 5. Ebstorf; 6. Hanstedt; 7. Himbergen; 8. Jelmstorf; 9. Natendorf; 10. Römstedt; 11. Schwienau; 12. Weste; 13. Wriedel	3. Rosche; 1. Oetzen; 2. Rätzlingen; 3. Rosche^{1}; 4. Stoetze; 5. Suhlendorf; 4. Suderburg; 1. Eimke; 2. Gerdau; 3. Suderburg^{1}
	^{1}seat of the Samtgemeinde; ^{2}town
