= Wildeshausen Geest =

Nature park in Lower Saxony, Germany

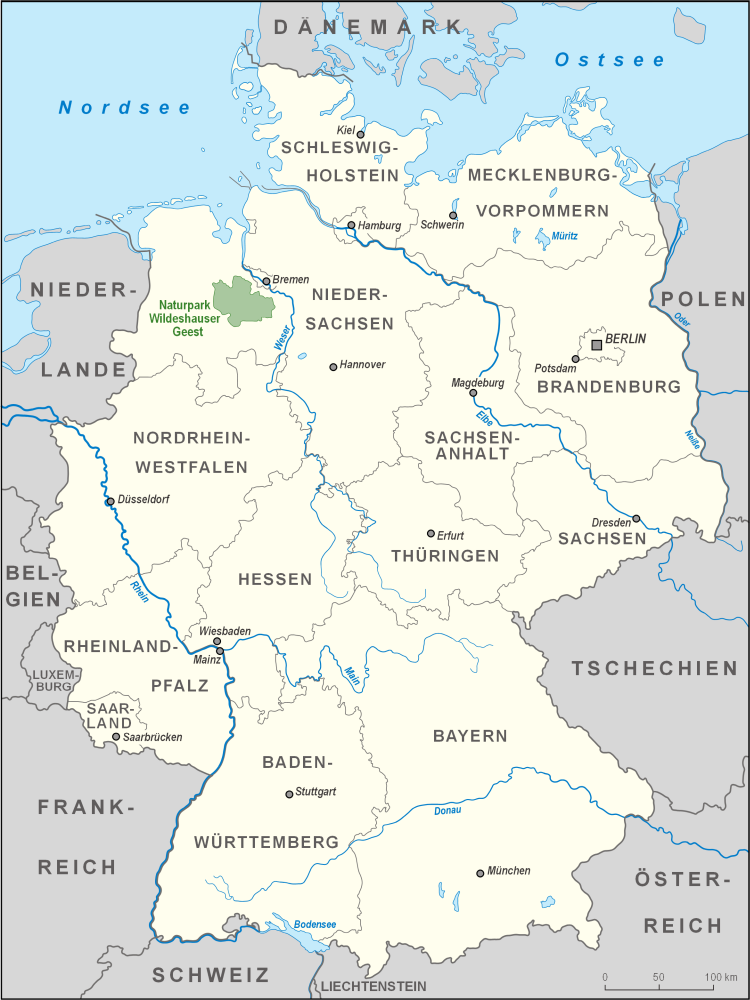
Wildeshausen Geest Nature Park within Germany

Logo

The Wildeshausen Geest (German: Wildeshauser Geest) is part of the northwest Germany's geest ridge, that begins near Meppen on the river Ems with the Hümmling, is broken by the Weser depression, continues with the Osterholz Geest and reaches the marshes of Kehdingen by the river Elbe with the ridges of the Wingst and Stade Geest. It gives its name to the eponymous nature park.

== Landscape ==
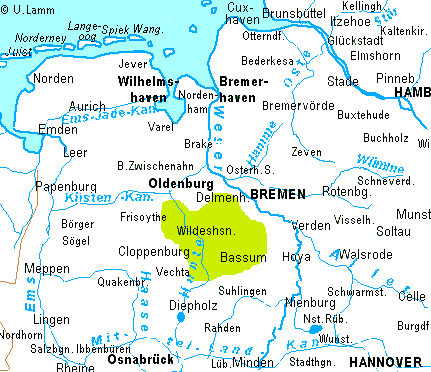
Wildeshausen Geest Nature Park

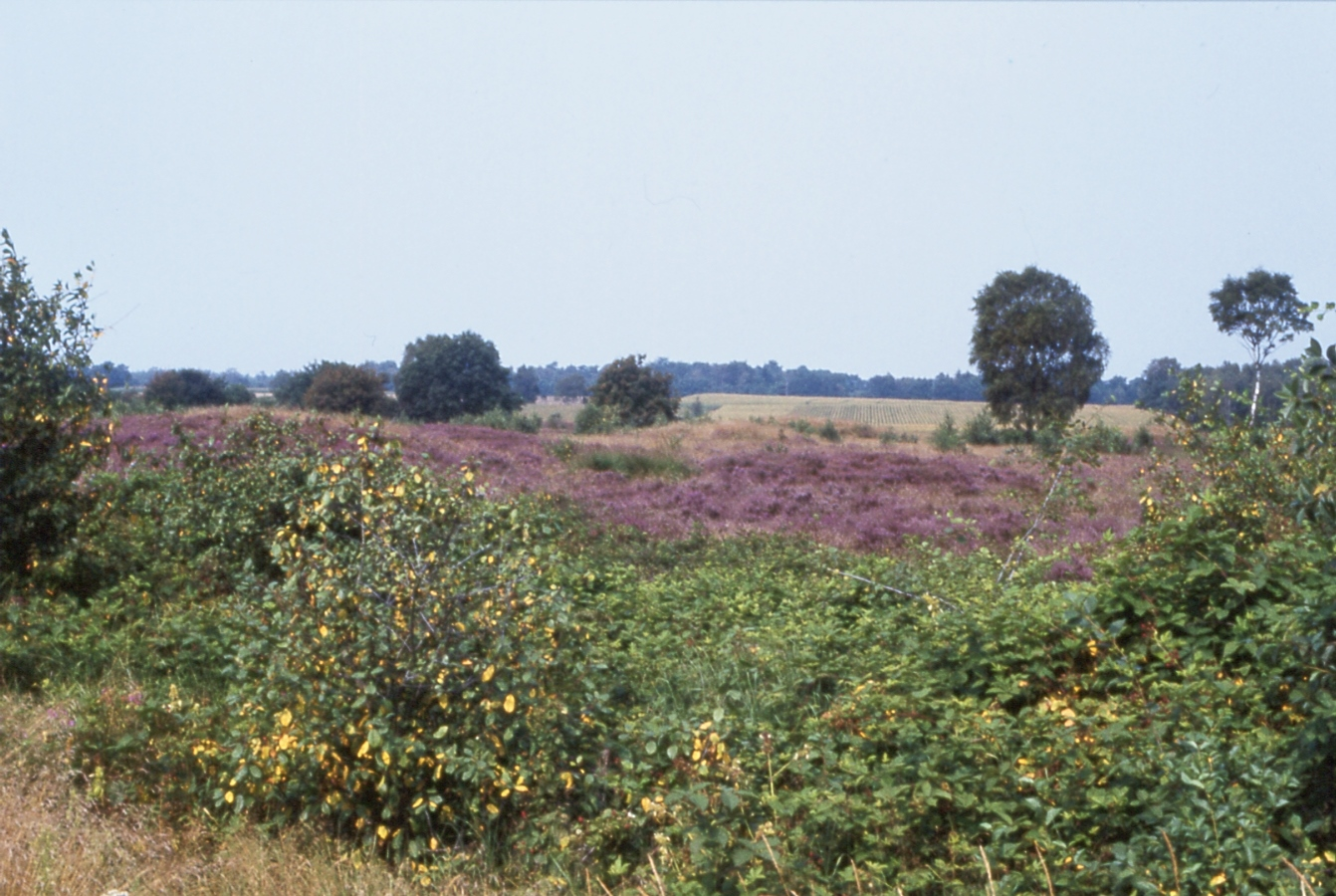
Heath near Großenkneten

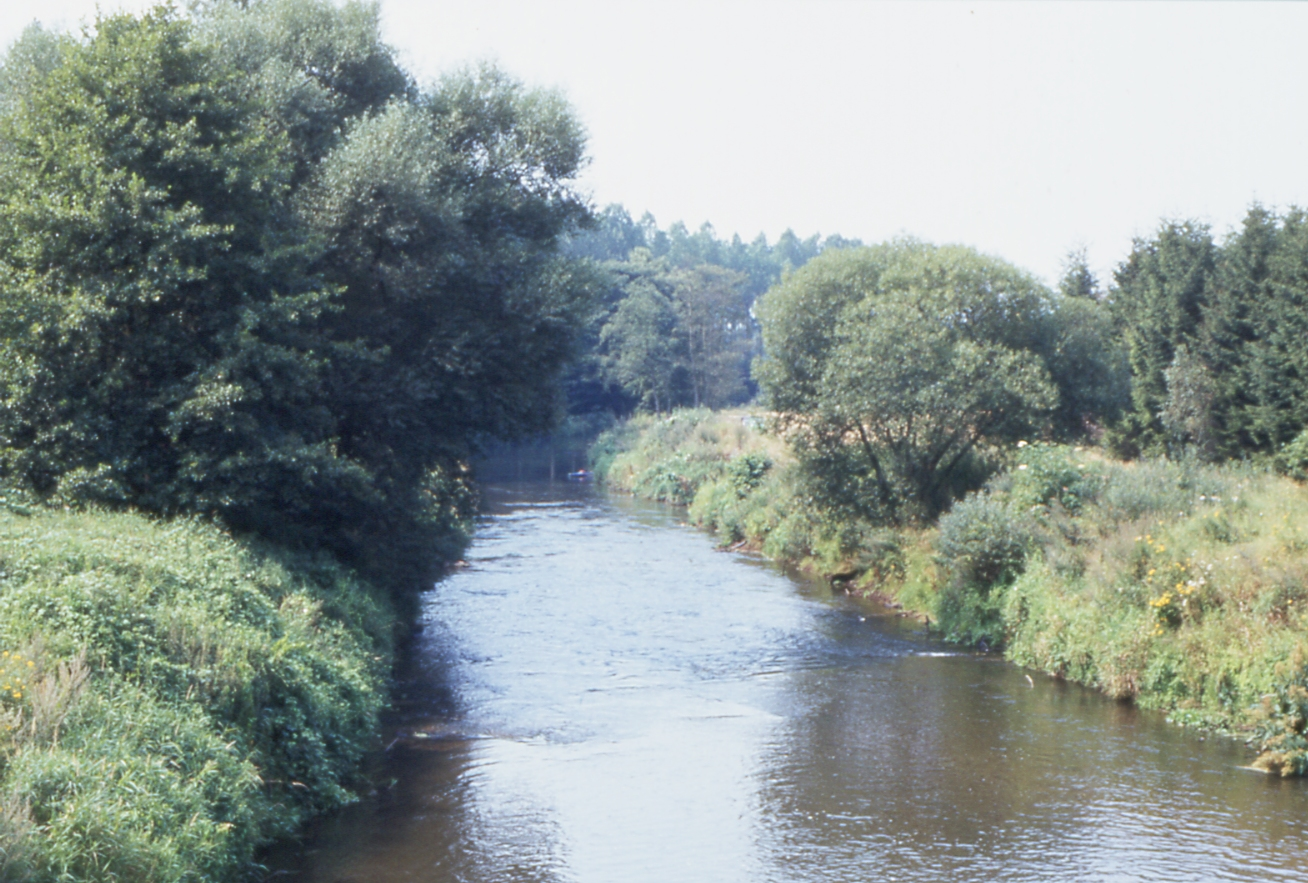
The River Hunte near Dötlingen

The term geest is a substantivisation of the Low German adjective güst, which means "dry and infertile". It is an Old Drift landscape, characterised by the sandy depositions of the Ice Age. In the depressions between them are wet meadows and, where drainage is poor, bogs.

To the north the Wildeshausen Geest borders on the coastal marshes, to the south on a belt of wetland, which includes the Großes Moor, the Wietingsmoor and the Sulinger Moor, which reaches as far as the Wiehen Hills. The geest plateaux lie mainly at an elevation of 50 to 60 metres above sea level (Normalnull), but reach elevations even as high as 80 metres in the southeast Nienburg, an area which is outside the Nature Park itself. The striking eastern edge of the geest rises between Hoya and Syke about 40 metres above the Weser Lowlands, west of Syke the land is still about 20 to 30 metres high. On the southern perimeter there is a height difference of 20 metres in places, but often no difference at all.

The larger waterbodies of the Wildeshausen Geest flow from south to north. Apart from the Hunte coming from the Wiehen Hills, they are rivers that rise in the geest itself, especially the Delme, Klosterbach and Hache. The valleys of these small rivers given the landscape a characteristic division and rolling nature. On the northern edge of the geest between Ganderkesee and Barrien they bend towards the east. Small streams on the eastern rim of the geest gather themselves into the northwards-flowing lowland rivers such as the Süstedter Bach. The present pattern of land use forms a mosaic of woods, arable fields and grassland, which in places is separated by hedges. The woods are partly mixed, partly coniferous. The proportion of woodland is highest in the Wardenburg–Twistringen–Syke triangle, which includes the towns of Wildeshausen and Harpstedt.

== See also ==
- List of nature parks in Germany
- Route of Megalithic Culture - tourist route from Osnabrück to Oldenburg via some 33 Megalithic sites, several in the Wildeshausen area

== Sources ==
- Hans Huntemann: Die Wildeshauser Geest. Wege und Wanderungen. Oldenburg, 1981.
- Helga Klöver: Wildeshauser Geest. Städte und Landschaften im Naturpark entdecken und erleben. Ein illustriertes Reisehandbuch. Bremen 2000.
- Harald Witt: Die schönsten Radwanderungen zwischen Hunte, Weser und Wümme. Natur - Kultur – Geschichte. Bremen, 2003.
- Nils Aschenbeck and Rüdiger Lubricht (photos): Kirchen und Kirchhöfe an Hunte und Weser. Oldenburg, 2000.
- Ernst Andreas Friedrich: Naturdenkmale Niedersachsens. Hanover, 1980. ISBN 3-7842-0227-6
