= Beeke =

Beeke or Beekes may refer to:

== People ==
- Henry Beeke (1751–1837), English historian, theologian, and writer
- Joel Beeke (born 1952), U.S. Christian pastor and theologian
- Robert S. P. Beekes (1937–2017), Dutch linguist

== German rivers ==
- Bramstedter Beeke of Lower Saxony
- Eschenhäuser Beeke of Lower Saxony
- Heiligenloher Beeke of Lower Saxony
- Mützelburger Beeke of Mecklenburg-Vorpommern
- Nienstedter Beeke of Lower Saxony
- Schorlingborsteler Beeke of Lower Saxony

== Other ==
- Beeke language, a Bantu language
