= Bramstedter Beeke =

River in Germany

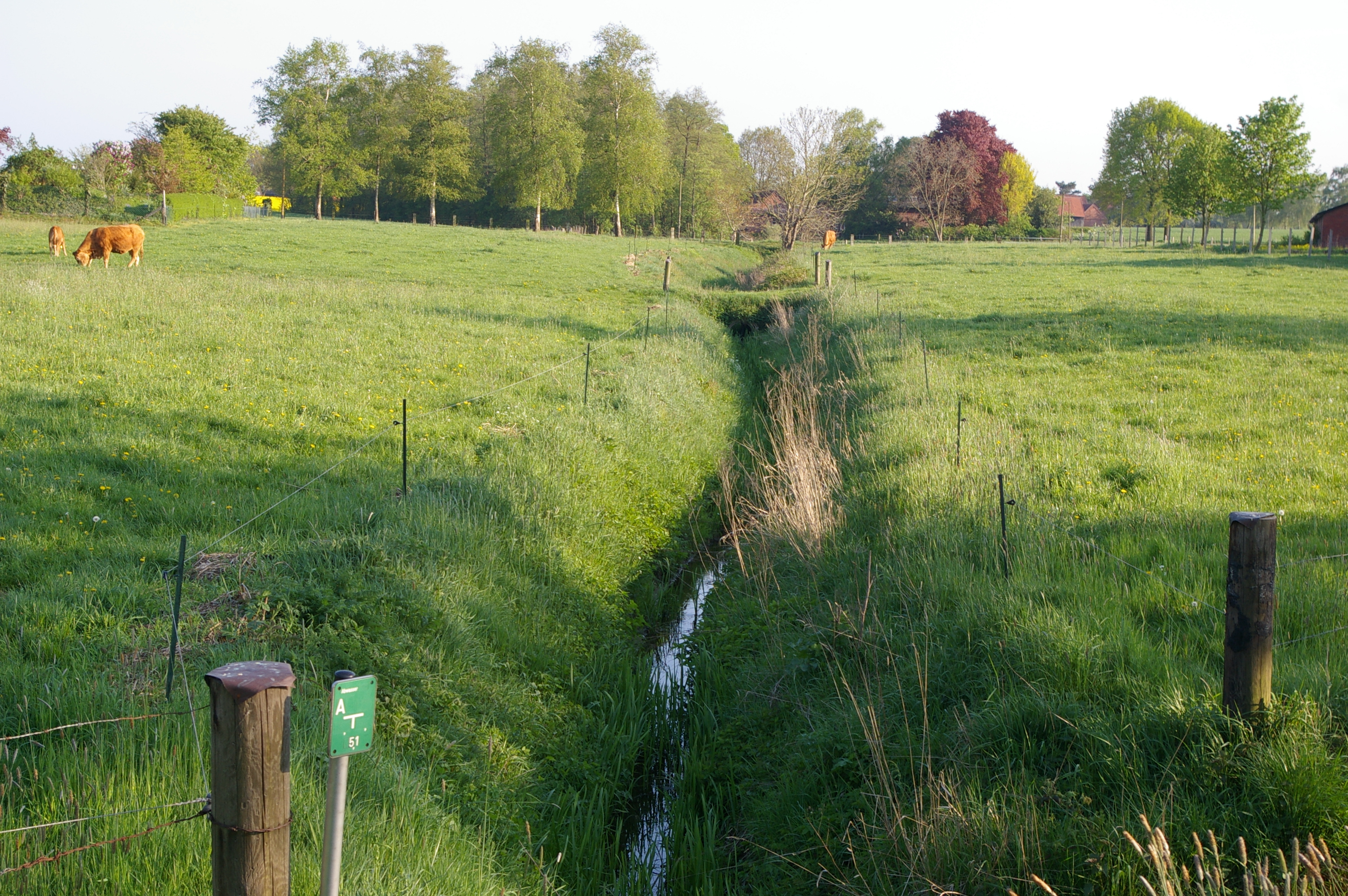

Location
- Country: Germany
- State: Lower Saxony

Physical characteristics
- Mouth
  - location: Finkenbach
  - coordinates: 52.8896°N 8.7615°E

Basin features
- Progression: Finkenbach→ Hombach→ Ochtum→ Weser→ North Sea

Bramstedter Beeke is a small river of Lower Saxony, Germany. It flows into the Finkenbach near Bassum.

== See also ==
- List of rivers of Lower Saxony
