= Eschenhäuser Beeke =

River in Germany

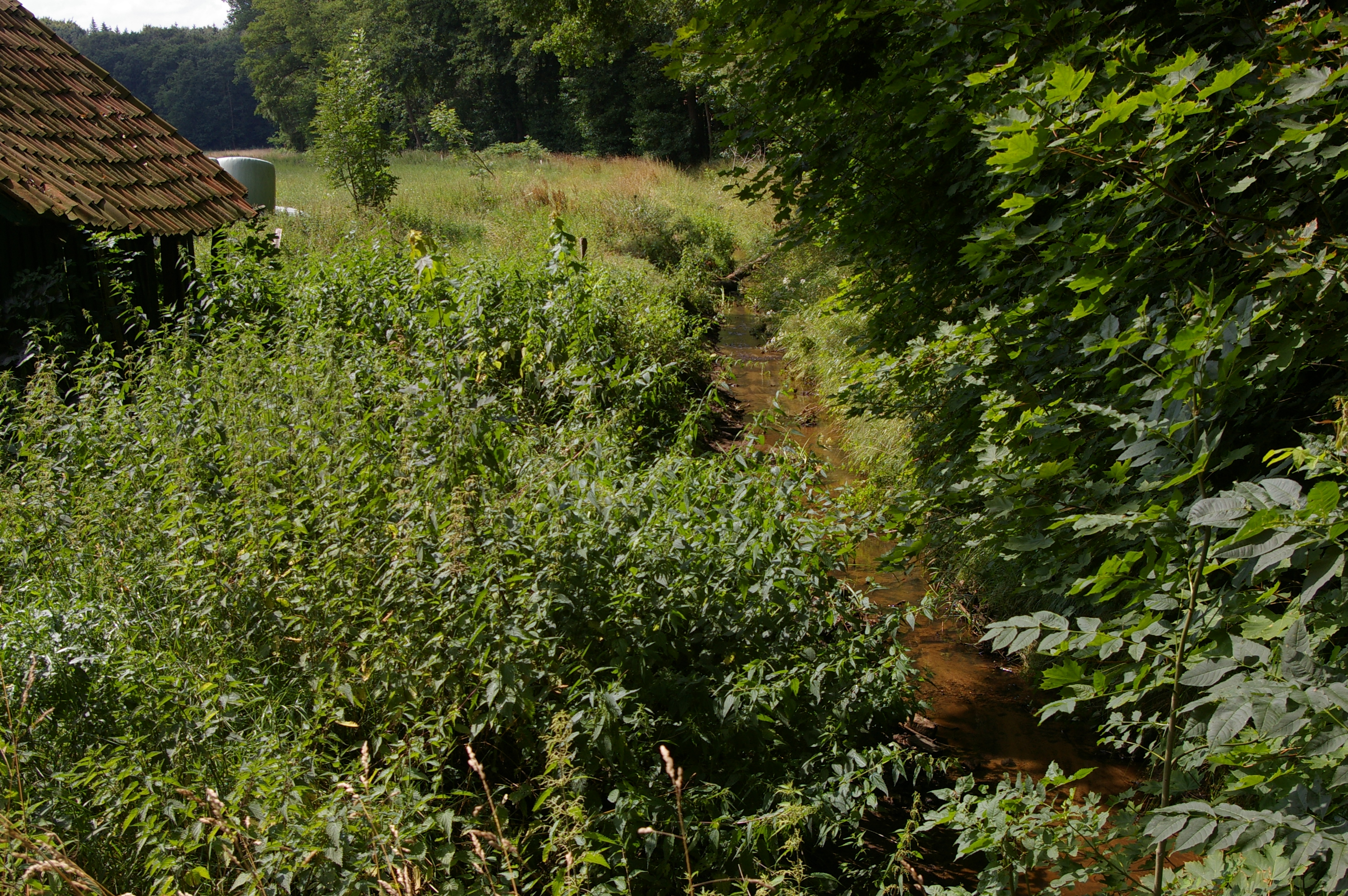

Location
- Country: Germany
- State: Lower Saxony

Physical characteristics
- Mouth
  - location: Nienstedter Beeke
  - coordinates: 52.8343°N 8.7412°E

Basin features
- Progression: Nienstedter Beeke→ Varreler Bäke→ Ochtum→ Weser→ North Sea

Eschenhäuser Beeke is a small river of Lower Saxony, Germany. It flows into the Nienstedter Beeke near Bassum.

== See also ==
- List of rivers of Lower Saxony
