= Blankenwaters Wiesengraben =

River in Germany

Location
- Country: Germany
- State: Lower Saxony

Physical characteristics
- Mouth
  - location: Süstedter Bach
  - coordinates: 52.9559°N 8.9077°E

Basin features
- Progression: Süstedter Bach→ Ochtum→ Weser→ North Sea

Blankenwaters Wiesengraben is a small river of Lower Saxony, Germany. It flows into the Süstedter Bach west of Riede.

== See also ==
- List of rivers of Lower Saxony
