= List of rivers of Bremen =

A list of rivers of the state Bremen, Germany:

== B ==
- Balge

== G ==
- Geeste

== K ==
- Kleine Weser and Werdersee

== L ==
- Lesum
- Lune

== O ==
- Ochtum

== S ==
- Schönebecker Aue

== V ==
- Varreler Bäke

== W ==
- Weser
- Westergate
- Wümme
