= Westergate (river) =

River in Germany

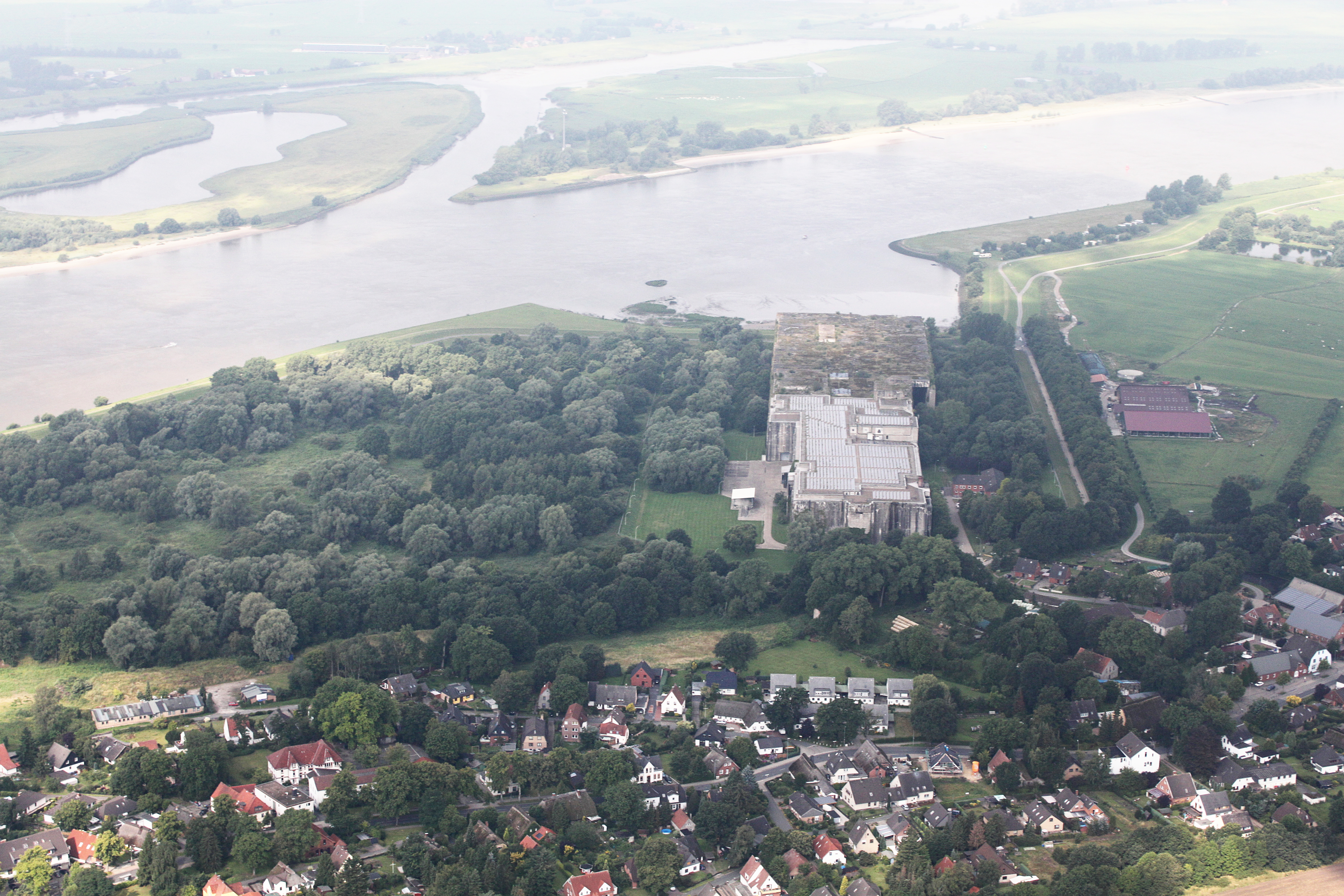
- Aerial view showing the Valentin submarine pens, the Weser and, in the background, the Westergate

Location
- Country: Germany
- States: Bremen and Lower Saxony

Physical characteristics
- Source
  - location: West of Farge
  - coordinates: 53.2024°N 8.5045°E
- Mouth
  - location: Near Elsfleth
  - coordinates: 53.2272°N 8.4661°E

Basin features
- Progression: Weser→ North Sea

Westergate is a short river of Bremen and Lower Saxony, Germany. It is a branch of the Weser.

The Westergate branches from the Weser west of Farge. It reunites with the Weser near Elsfleth.

== See also ==
- List of rivers of Bremen
- List of rivers of Lower Saxony
