= Weser Depression =

Coordinates: 52°26′23″N 9°00′34″E

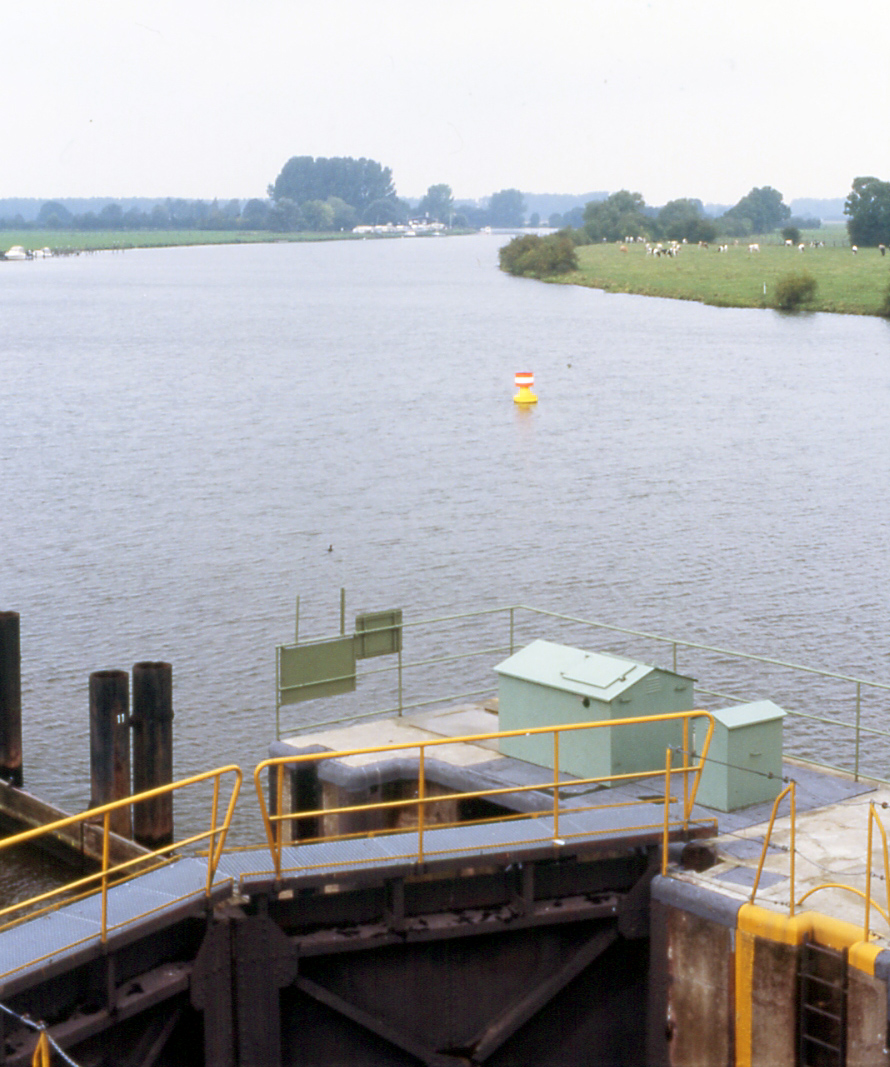
The Middle Weser near Drakenburg

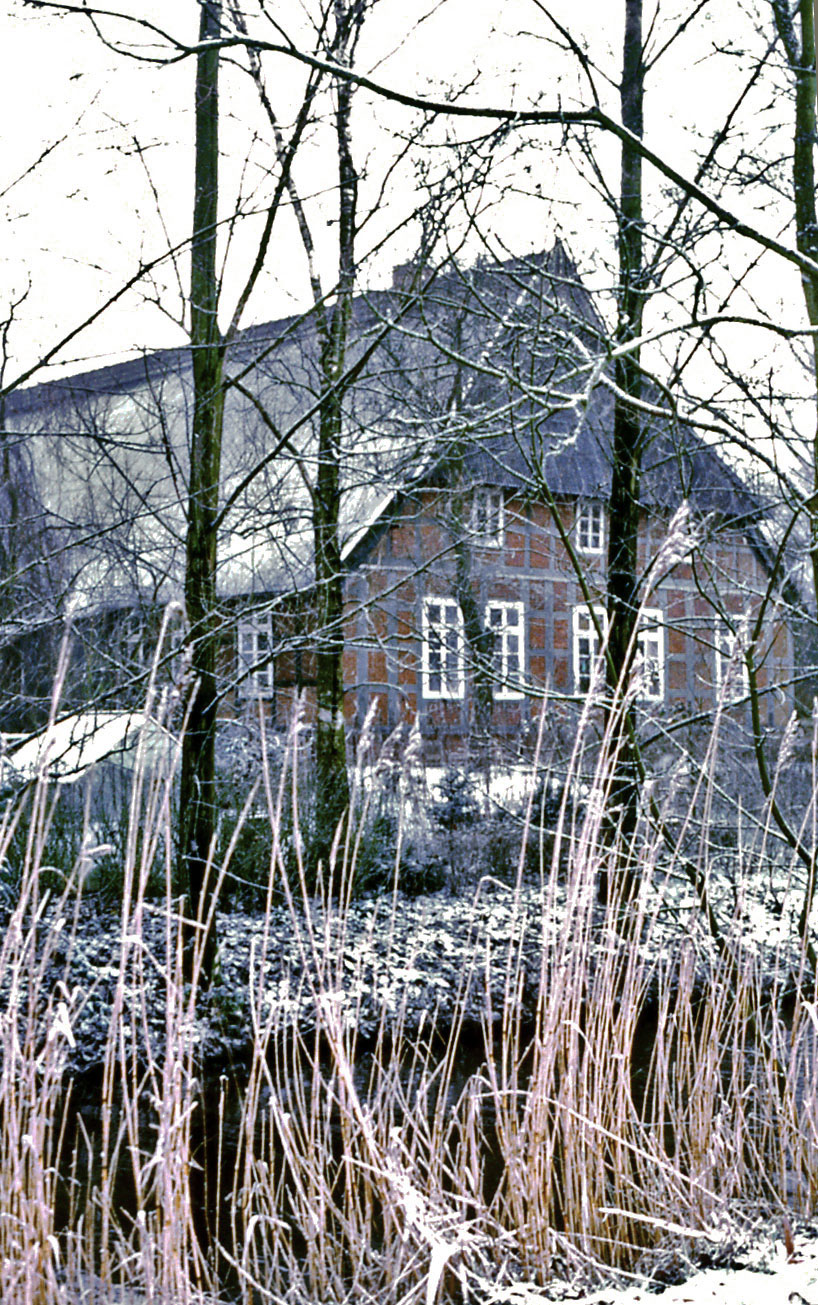
Winter in Stedingen

The Weser Depression (German: Weserniederung) or Weser Lowlands is the region north of Porta Westfalica in Germany, where the River Weser no longer flows through a valley, but a broad plain consisting of meadows and river terraces.

The flat plain of the depression is interrupted by geest ridges in places. From Langwedel, as far as the River Lesum, it is separated from the Wümme Depression by a narrow ridge of dunes, on which the town of Achim and the older districts of the city of Bremen lie. At many places, such as south of the mouth of the River Aller or in Bremen-Huchting, the Weser Depression transitions to bog and marsh without any clear boundary. The southern part of the Weser Depression belongs to the state of North Rhine-Westphalia, with its towns of Minden and Petershagen. The borough of Petershagen includes Westphalia's northernmost Weser settlement, Schlüsselburg. North of that, the Weser passes the Low Saxon town of Stolzenau.

Below Hoya, the Weser reaches the Breslau-Magdeburg-Bremen glacial valley, which approaches from the southeast. As the Weser heads off in a northwestern direction, the edge of the Wildeshausen Geest bears away to the west and the Weser Depression broadens to a width of about 20 kilometres (12 mi). Here there are also carr landscapes. From Achim to Bremen-Blumenthal, the width of the depression reduces again to about 10 kilometres (6.2 mi). In the wide sections of the depression the soil does not just consist of river sediments or bog, but is also sandy in places. These areas of sand at the level of the depression are also known as 'foregeest' (Vorgeest), but are nevertheless separated by a boggy strip from the ascending edge of the geest itself. The largest are the Schwarme Heath (Schwarmer Heide) and the Thedinghausen Foregeest (Thedinghauser Vorgeest). Downstream of Bremen, the marshlands of Stedingen come close to the Weser. The river is separated from the northwestern edge of the geest by a wide, nowadays largely cultivated, strip of moor.

The eastern edge of the Weser Depression lies closer to the river from the confluence of the Aller (near Verden) to Bremen-Rönnebeck. In Bremen, the Bremen Dunes, south of the Lesum, separate the Weser Depression from the Wümme Depression. North of the Lesum, the Osterholz Geest, near Bremen-Vegesack, forms a steep river bank.

In the north, the Weser Depression transitions into the coastal marshes. Northwest of its confluence with the Hunte, there are no natural eminences between the Weser and the Jade Bight. The height of this peninsula, comprising Stadland and Butjadingen, lies between 0.8 metres under sea level (NN) and 1.2 metres above it (at a place on the 'neck' of the Jade Bight it reaches 2 metres). The first ridge of geest does not appear until the far side of the Jade Bight, the Friesische Wehde. On the eastern side of the Lower Weser, the edge of the Osterholz Geest peels away north of Bremen-Blumenthal to a distance of six to ten kilometres from the river. The marshland here is called Osterstade.

== Administrative regions ==
Politically, the Weser Depression is divided between the following administrative units that belong to the state of Lower Saxony, apart from those in the district of Minden-Lübbecke and the city of Bremen:

- Minden-Lübbecke district (North Rhine-Westphalia)
- Nienburg district
- Verden district
- Diepholz district
- the town of Delmenhorst
- Free Hanseatic City of Bremen
- Wesermarsch district

== References and other external links ==
- Natural regions in the district of Verden (in German)
- Landscape fact file "Middle Weser Valley" (in German)
- Wesermarsch district: The Weser Marsh (in German)

== Sources ==
- LGN = Landesvermessung und Geobasisinformation Niedersachsen: Regionalkarten 1:100 000, Nr.10 "Mittelweser" und Nr.2 "Nordoldenburg".
