= Finkenbach (Bassum) =

River in Lower Saxony, Germany

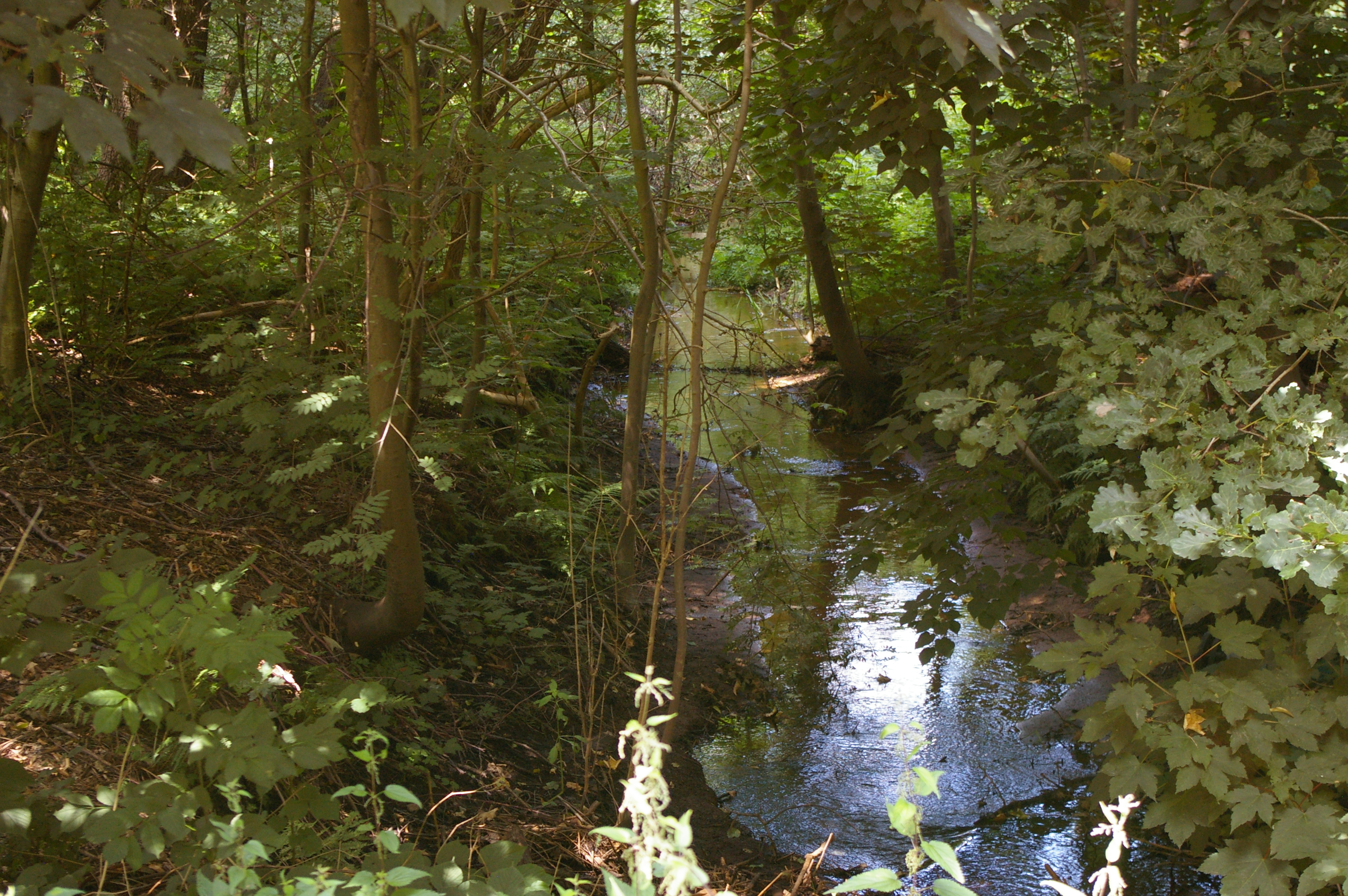

Location
- Country: Germany
- State: Lower Saxony

Physical characteristics
- Mouth
  - location: Hombach
  - coordinates: 52.8997°N 8.7348°E

Basin features
- Progression: Hombach→ Ochtum→ Weser→ North Sea

Finkenbach (German pronunciation: [ˈfɪŋkn̩bax]) is a river in the Lower Saxony, Germany. It is a right tributary of the Hombach. It flows in the area of Bassum.

== See also ==
- List of rivers of Lower Saxony
