= Kleine Weser and Werdersee =

Lake in Germany

Coordinates: 53°03′57″N 8°48′30″E

Kleine Weser und Werdersee
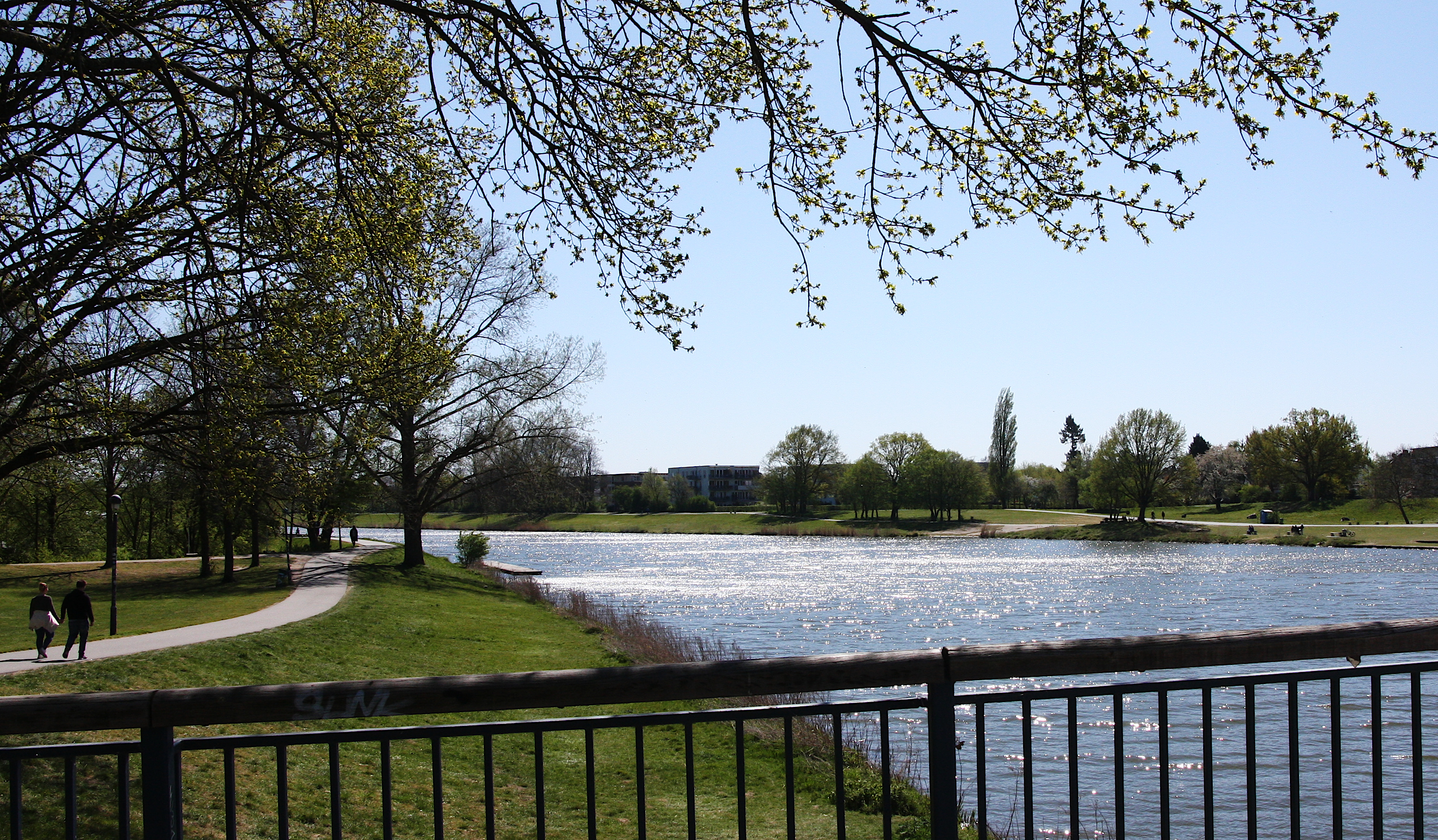

Location
- Country: Germany
- States: Bremen

Until 1968, the Kleine Weser and the Werdersee were part of the river Weser in Bremen, Germany.

== See also ==
- List of rivers of Bremen
