= Finkenbach =

Finkenbach may refer to:

- Finkenbach (Laxbach), a river of Hesse and Baden-Württemberg, Germany
- Finkenbach (Bassum), a river of Lower Saxony, Germany
- Finkenbach (Lutter), a river of North Rhine-Westphalia, Germany
- Finkenbach-Gersweiler, a municipality in the Donnersbergkreis district, in Rhineland-Palatinate, Germany
- Finkenbach (Oberzent), a village and part of Oberzent in Hesse, Germany
