= Twistringen =

- Town
- Coat of arms

- Location of Twistringen within Diepholz district
- Interactive map of Twistringen
- Location within Germany Location within Lower Saxony
- Coordinates: 52°48′N 08°39′E
- Country: Germany
- State: Lower Saxony
- District: Diepholz
- Subdivisions: 9 districts

Government
  - Mayor (2019–24): Jens Bley

Area
  - Total: 114.37 km^{2} (44.16 sq mi)
- Elevation: 49 m (161 ft)

Population (2025-12-31)
  - Total: 13,166
  - Density: 115.12/km^{2} (298.15/sq mi)
- Time zone: UTC+01:00 (CET)
  - Summer (DST): UTC+02:00 (CEST)
- Postal codes: 27239
- Dialling codes: 04243
- Vehicle registration: DH, SY
- Website: www.twistringen.de

Twistringen (German pronunciation: [ˈtvɪstʁɪŋən]; Low German: Twustern) is a town in the district of Diepholz, Lower Saxony, Germany. It is located approximately 30 km northeast of Diepholz, and 30 km southwest of Bremen. The source of the Delme river is located in the city. The most important attraction in Twistringen is the museum of straw processing.

== History ==
Twistringen was first mentioned in a document in 1250 as "Thuisteringe". In this writing, all towns had to pay early contributions for the maintenance of the bridge over the Weser in Bremen. There was a parish in the city since approximately 825. After the Reformation in 1525, the parish Twistring was re-Catholicized in 1618. Located in a predominantly Protestant area, Twistringen was a Catholic enclave of the Prince-Bishopric of Münster. It has been a part of the Diocese Osnabrück since 1824. Today, Twistringen is still mainly Catholic.

Under French rule from 1811 to 1813, a modern road connection, the Napoleon Road (now called B 51) was built in Twistringen. In 1817, it became part of the Kingdom of Hanover.

Only after the construction of the rail connection between Bremen and Osnabrück in 1873, did Lutherans settle in the town again. These founded a Protestant-Lutheran congregation in 1891 and inaugurated their own church in 1894.

There was also a small Jewish community in Twistringen. Until 1938, there was a synagogue, which is still commemorated by a plaque. Somewhat outside of the center of Twistringen, there is still a Jewish cemetery.

In 1964, Twistringen gained town privileges. In 1974, the Municipality Twistringen was created with the incorporation of the localities of Abbenhausen, Altenmarhorst, Heiligenloh, Mörsen, Natenstedt, Rüssen, Scharrendorf, Stelle and Twistringen.

=== Importance of straw processing ===
Hay processing has played an important role in Twistringen for centuries. At times, one third of all inhabitants were somehow employed in this industry. Straw hats, drinking straws, etc. were produced in Twistringen and exported into many countries. The museum of straw processing documents the history and development of this industry from its beginning to the present.

==== Largest straw hat in the world ====
To celebrate the 750th anniversary of the town in 2000, a giant straw hat, which made it into the Guinness Book of World Records was constructed in front of the town hall. It had a diameter of 5.50 meters. The celebration was also visited by Reinhold Beckmann, a well-known television host, who hails from Twistringen. Now the hat can be found in the museum.

=== Early medieval ring wall ===
A castle called Hünenburg is situated in the borough Stöttinghausen. Only a ring wall with a diameter of 80 meters is still visible. It is the remains of a fortress, from the 5th to 9th century. An examination of the interior of the wall in 1932 turned out that several buildings had once existed here. In 2005, the wooden entrance gate was reconstructed to give the structure a look, reminding visitors of a castle.

=== Geological finds ===
As far as geology, Twistringen has gained supra-regional relevance. Until the 1990s, mudstone was exhausted in the mine of the brickyard in the outskirts of town. These are sediments of the North Sea, which were deposed in the region during the Miocene period.

In the mudstones a fauna very rich in both species and organisms was found. They contained a lot of snails, clams, scaphopods, and corals, but also more rarely sea urchins, vertebrate skeletons and teeth, and rests of cephalopods. The fauna was generally small and unspectacular. However, because of the diversity of species - at least 250 species of snails from the strata of Twistringen are known and described -, thus a picture of the animal world of this time period so exact is gained, that Twistringen has become one of the "classical place of discovery of paleontology". Finds from Twistringen are in numerous museums and private collections.

=== Airplane disaster of 1973 ===
On November 13, 1973, a Belgian F-104 Starfighter crashed into a home in the borough of Mörsen. The pilot, a fireman, the father, the mother, and two girls died. A young boy was able to escape out of a hatch before the fire spread to the home. The disaster left three young orphans.

=== International relations ===
Since 1977, Twistringen has been partnered with the French municipality Bonnétable, which is situated in the department of Sarthe. In Bonnétable, there is a street called "Rue de Twistringen".

Since 2011 there is also a partnership with the Lithuanian city Kaišiadorys which has 10.000 inhabitants and is part of the Kaunas area.

== Politics ==
The city council has 26 seats plus that of the mayor. Since the communal elections of September 11, 2011, the seat distribution is as follows:

- CDU 15 seats
- SPD 5 seats
- Greens 4 seats
- FDP 2 seats

== Transportation ==
Twistringen is on the railway line Bremen-Osnabrück. There is a train to Bremen every half-hour and to Osnabrück every hour. The B51, a federal road which runs from Bremen to Osnabrück, runs through the center of Twistringen. Driving to Bremen takes about 45 minutes, to Osnabrück 70 minutes.

Twistringen is 36 km away from Bremen Airport.

== Schools and educational institutions ==
In Twistringen, there are 2 elementary schools and a school center, where a Hauptschule, a Realschule, a Gymnasium, the Hildegard-von-Bingen-Gymnasium Twistringen, and a municipal library are located. There are also several kindergartens.

== People from Twistringen ==
- Paul Requadt (1902–1983), Germanist
- Hartwig Steenken (1941–1978), jumper rider
- May Spils (1941–), film director
- Brigitte Seebacher-Brandt (1946–), historian
- Reinhold Beckmann (1956–), television host
- Karl-Thomas Neumann, CEO Continental AG
