= Paul Requadt =

German Germanist

Paul Requadt (23 January 1902 – 17 July 1983) was a German Germanist.

== Life ==
Born in Twistringen, from 1920 to 1926 Requadt studied law in Göttingen, Heidelberg, Munich and Cologne before switching to German studies, history, philosophy and sociology. After the doctorate in 1926 with Ernst Bertram at the University of Cologne and habilitation in 1944 with Willi Flemming at the University of Rostock, he was privatdozent at the University of Mainz from 1947 to 1950, where he taught as professor of German philology from 1950 to 1970.

Requadt died in Mainz at the age of 81.

== Publications ==
- Johannes von Müller und der Frühhistorismus. Munich 1929, OCLC 251999616.
- Beethoven
- Die Bildersprache der deutschen Italiendichtung. Von Goethe bis Benn. Bern 1962, OCLC 3048041.
- Lichtenberg. Stuttgart 1964, OCLC 781862.
- Bildlichkeit der Dichtung. Aufsätze zur deutschen Literatur vom 18. bis 20. Jahrhundert. Munich 1974, OCLC 2031236.
