= Hartwig Steenken =

German equestrian (1941–1978)

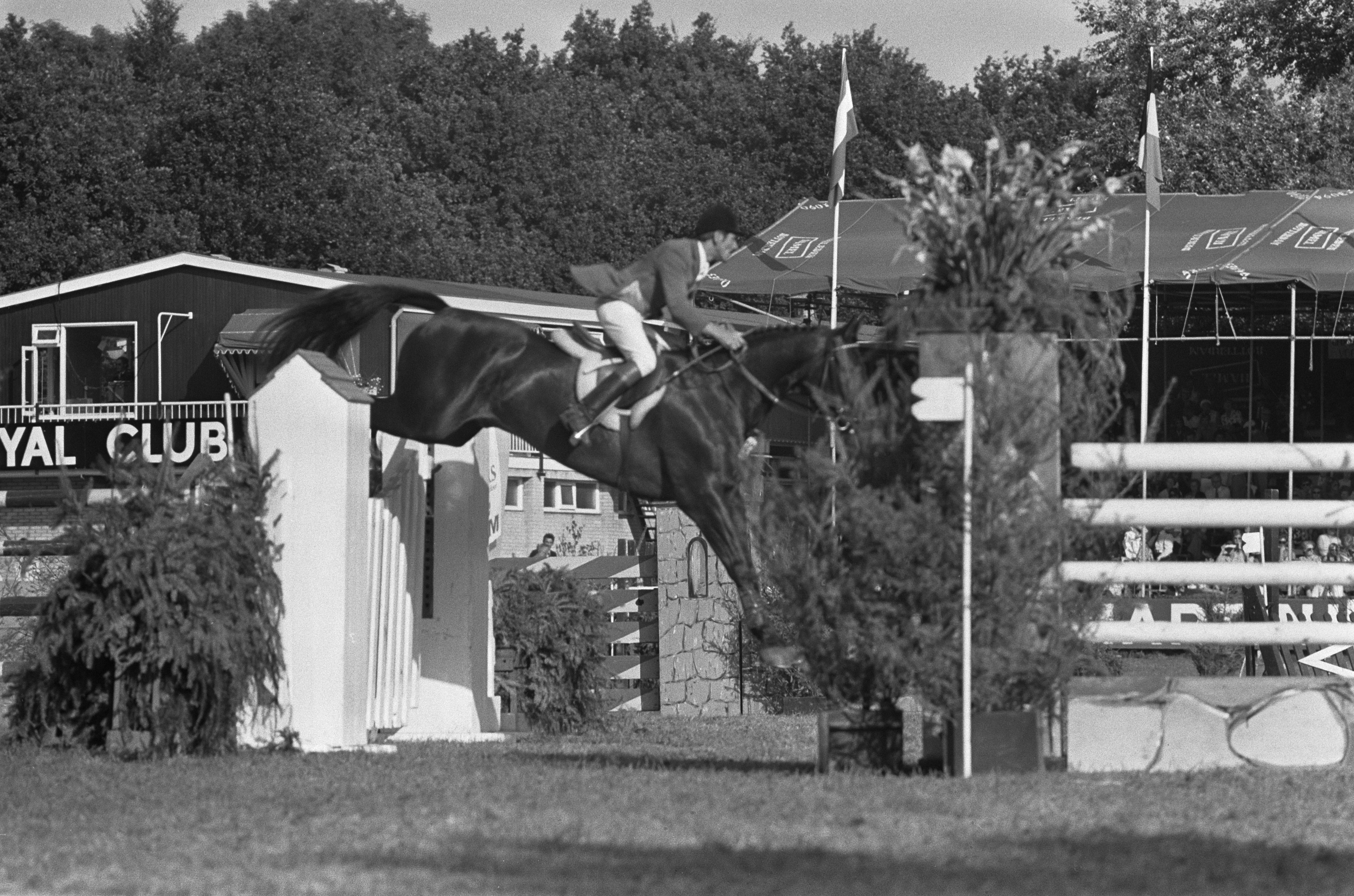

Personal information
- Nationality: German
- Born: 23 July 1941 Twistringen
- Died: 10 January 1978 (aged 36)

Sport
- Sport: Equestrian
Medal record
Equestrian
Representing West Germany
Olympic Games
Gold medal – first place	1972 Munich	Show jumping, Team

Hartwig Steenken (23 July 1941 – 10 January 1978) was a West German show jumper. He was born in Twistringen, and raised on his father's farm in Bowrede near Hoya in Lower Saxony.

Steenken won the individual title at the 1971 European Championships and the 1974 World Championships, and was on the West German team that won the gold medal at the 1972 Olympics, where he came fourth in the individual event. He won silver at the 1975 European Championships, and decided not to compete in the 1976 Olympics as he had no horse good enough to win; his earlier mount, Simona, being too old.

On 1 July 1977, Steenken broke the FEI's rules on amateurism by signing a sponsorship deal with Campari. Twelve days later, he sustained serious head injuries as a passenger in a car which crashed into a wall returning from an amateur football match in which he had played. He fell into a coma and died six months later in Hanover.
