= Reinhold Beckmann =

German journalist and presenter (born 1956)

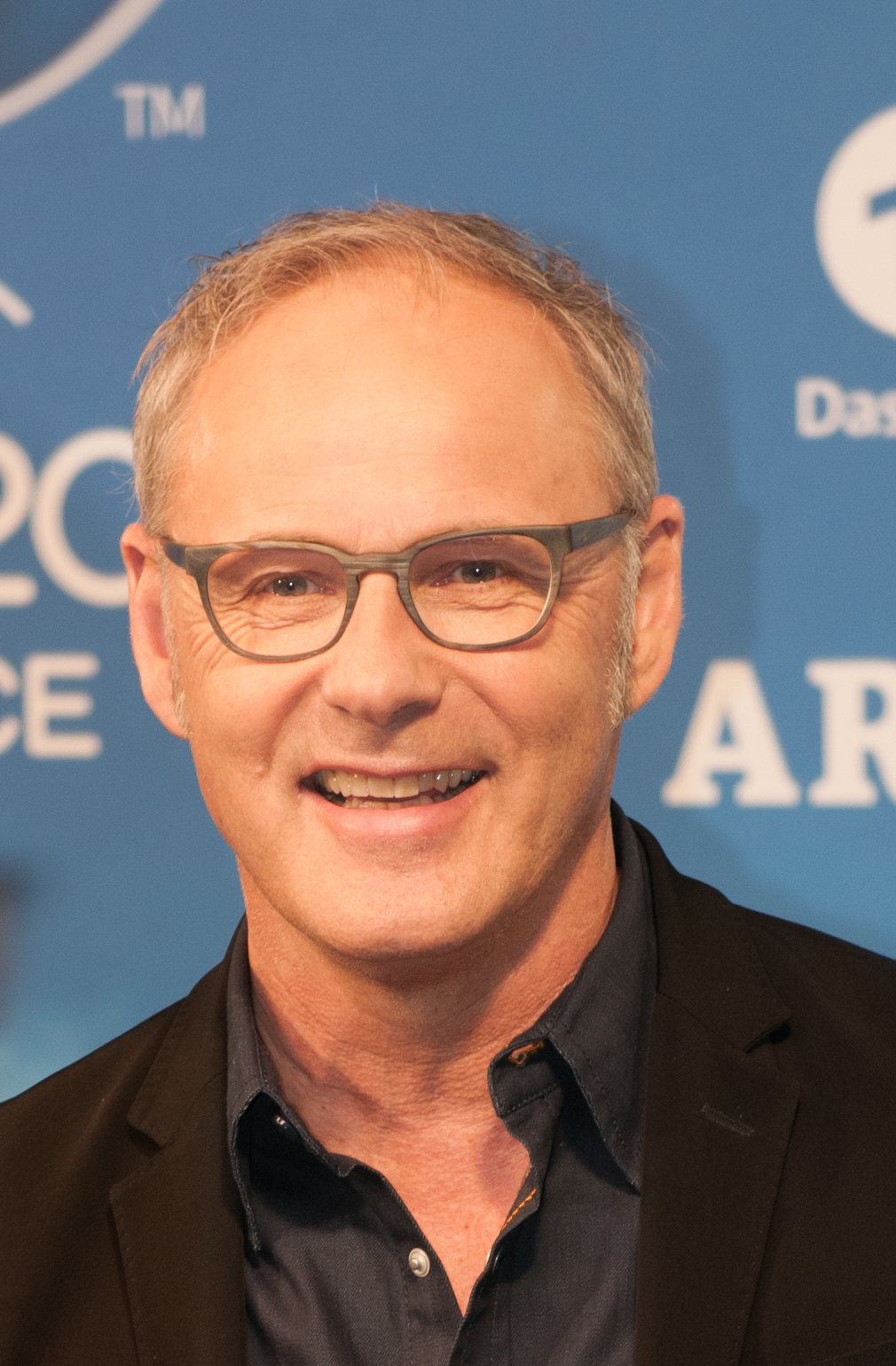
Beckmann in 2016

Reinhold Beckmann (born 23 February 1956) is a German journalist and television presenter.

He was born in Twistringen, Lower Saxony. After school in Syke, he studied German, film and theatre in Cologne.

In 1980, Beckmann began to work for broadcaster WDR, in programs such as Aktuelle Stunde. As a sports journalist, he worked for Premiere from 1990 to 1992. He then joined Sat.1, again as a sportscaster (in programs such as ran and ranissimo). From 1998, Beckmann worked for ARD, in programs such as Sportschau and, from 1999 to 2014, had his own talkshow Beckmann. He retired on 6 May 2017.

Beckmann and his family live in Hamburg. He is married, with two children.

== Awards ==
- 1995: Bayerischer Fernsehpreis
- 1995: Goldene Kamera
- 1995: Romy
