= Süstedter Bach =

River in Germany

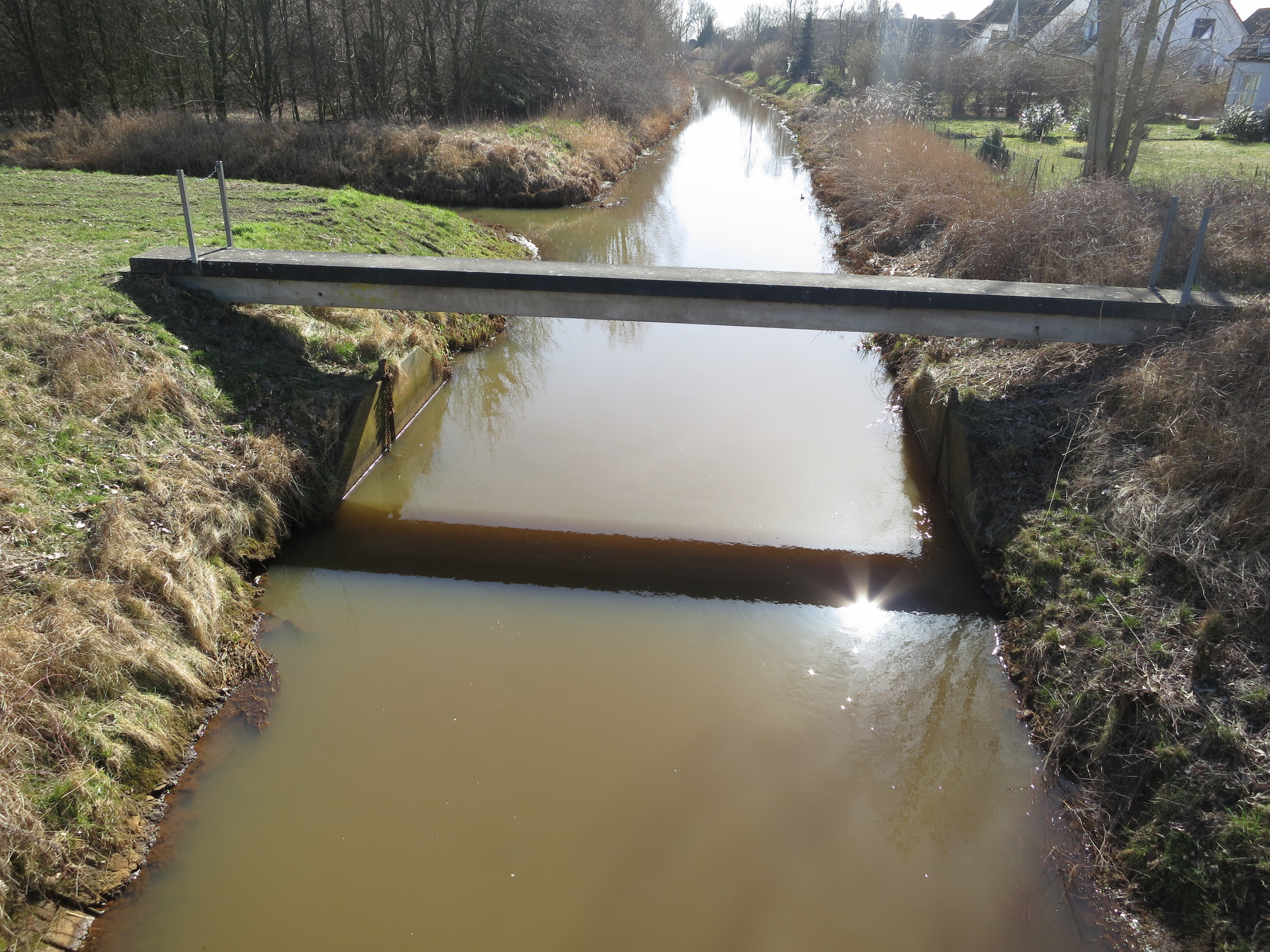

Location
- Country: Germany
- State: Lower Saxony

Physical characteristics
- Mouth
  - location: Ochtum
  - coordinates: 52.9970°N 8.8797°E

Basin features
- Progression: Ochtum→ Weser→ North Sea

Süstedter Bach is a river of Lower Saxony, Germany. It is one of the source rivers of the Ochtum near Weyhe.

== See also ==
- List of rivers of Lower Saxony
