= Nienstedter Beeke =

River in Germany

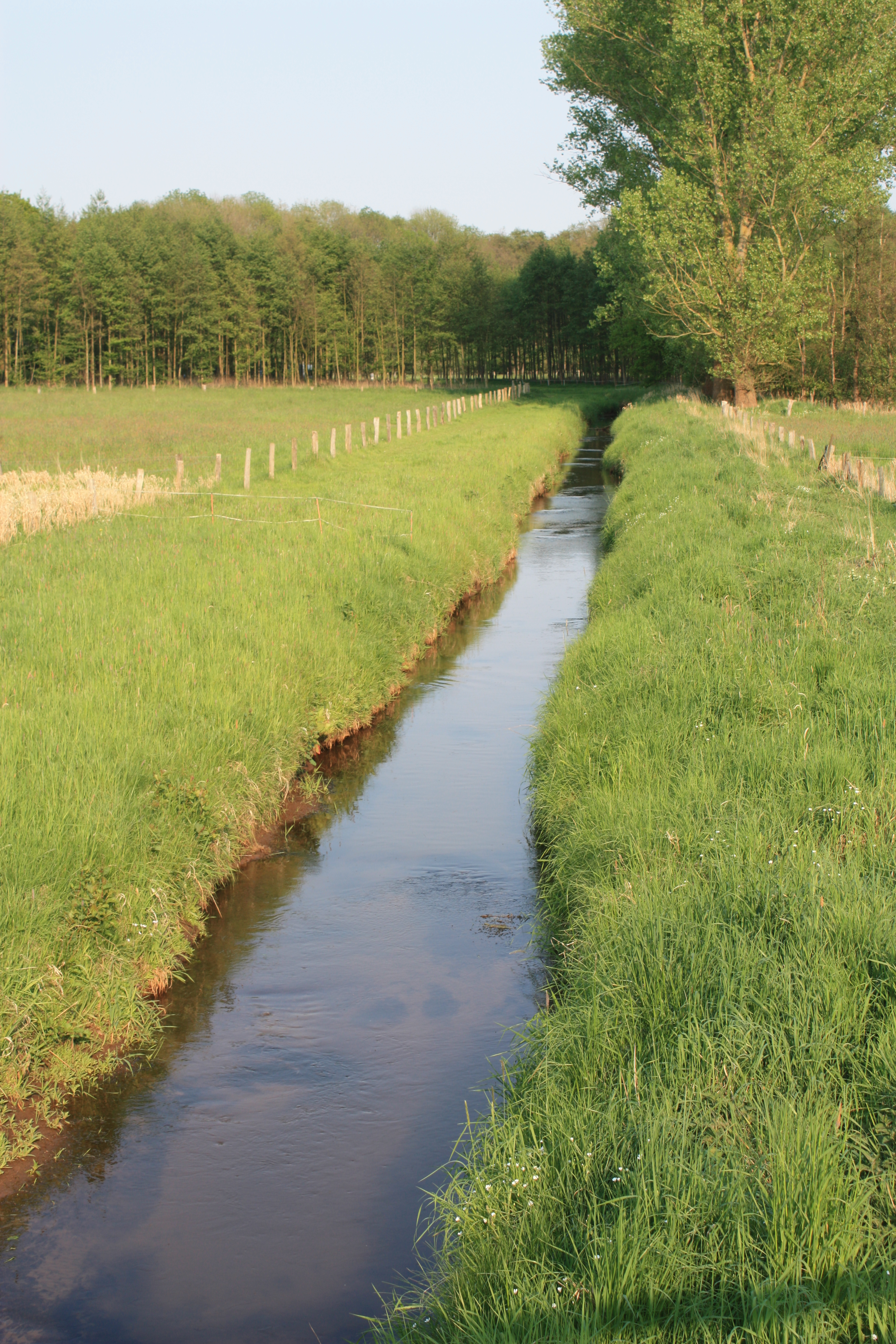

Location
- Country: Germany
- State: Lower Saxony

Physical characteristics
- Mouth
  - location: Varreler Bäke
  - coordinates: 52.8336°N 8.7304°E
- Length: 11.6 km (7.2 mi)

Basin features
- Progression: Varreler Bäke→ Ochtum→ Weser→ North Sea

Nienstedter Beeke is a river of Lower Saxony, Germany. It flows into the Klosterbach (the upper course of the Varreler Bäke) near Bassum.

== See also ==
- List of rivers of Lower Saxony
