= Hache (Ochtum) =

River in Germany

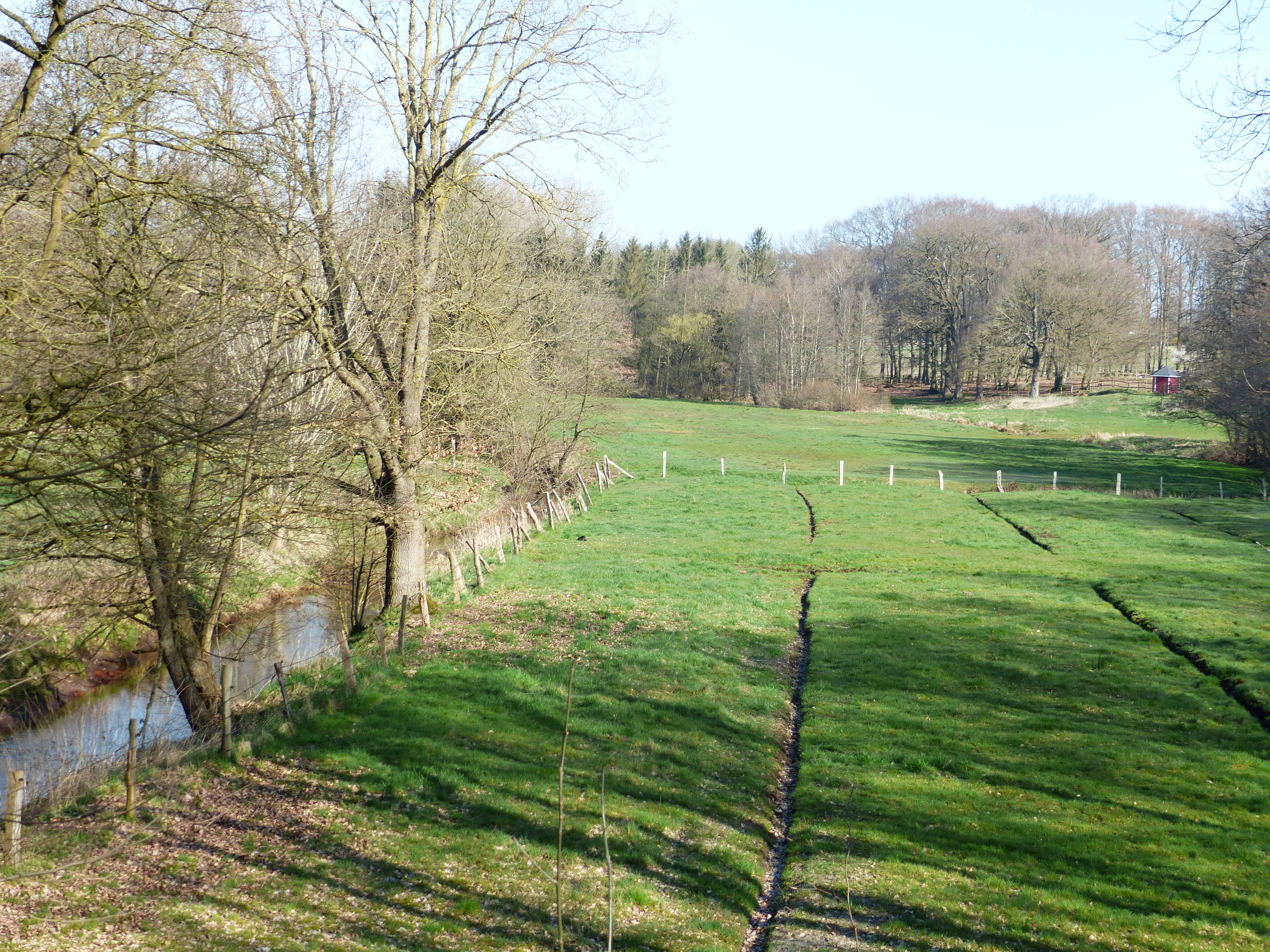

Location
- Country: Germany
- State: Lower Saxony

Physical characteristics
- Mouth
  - location: Ochtum
  - coordinates: 52.9969°N 8.8798°E
- Length: 32.5 km (20.2 mi)
- Basin size: 118 km^{2} (46 sq mi)

Basin features
- Progression: Ochtum→ Weser→ North Sea

Hache (German pronunciation: [ˈhaxə]) is a river of Lower Saxony, Germany. It flows into the Ochtum near Leeste.

== See also ==
- List of rivers of Lower Saxony
