= Delme (river) =

River in Germany

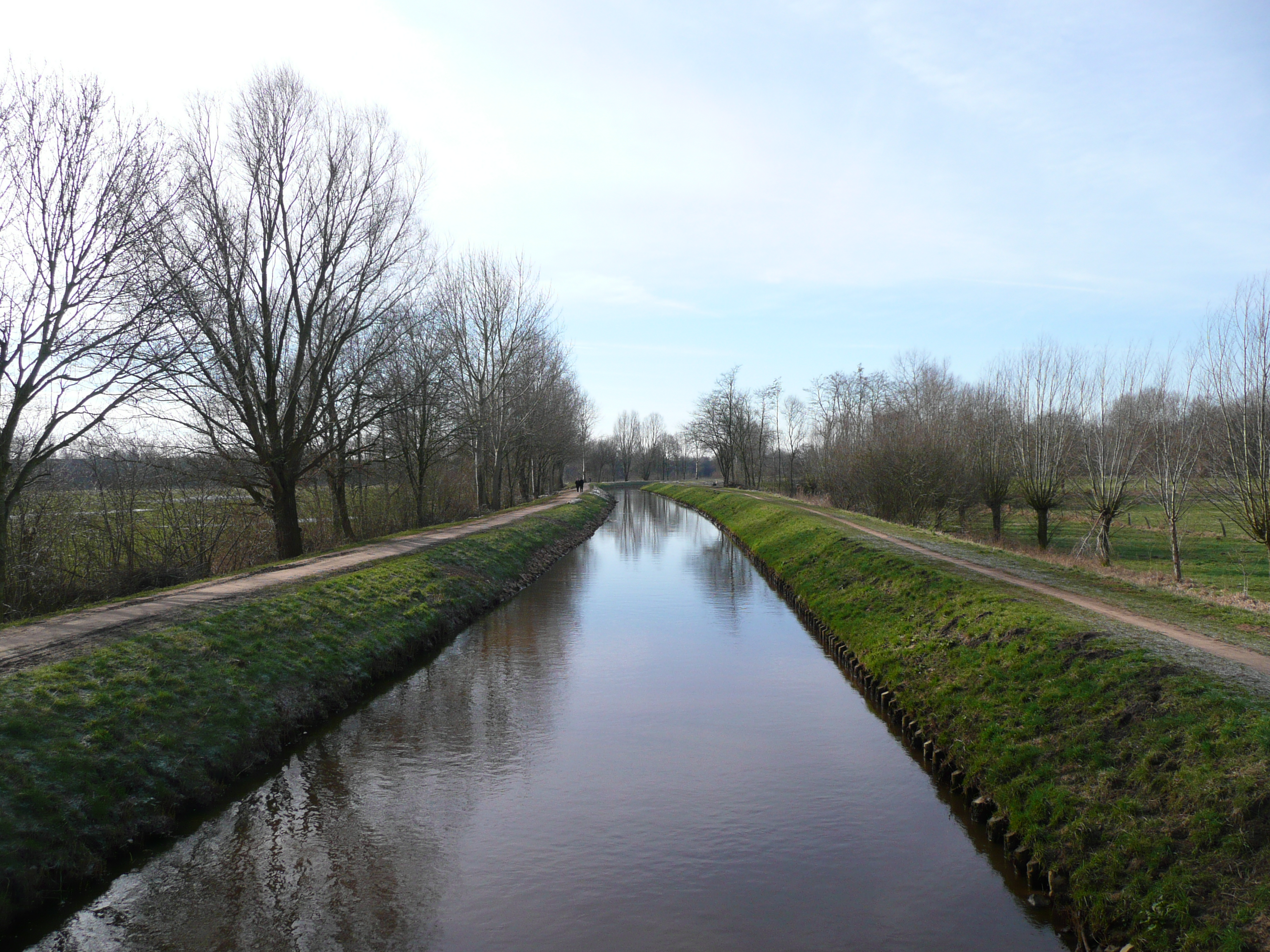

Location
- Country: Germany
- State: Lower Saxony

Physical characteristics
- Mouth
  - location: Ochtum
  - coordinates: 53.0882°N 8.6716°E
- Length: 46.0 km (28.6 mi)
- Basin size: 248 km^{2} (96 sq mi)

Basin features
- Progression: Ochtum→ Weser→ North Sea

Delme (German pronunciation: [ˈdɛlmə]) is a river of Lower Saxony, Germany. It flows into the Ochtum northeast of Delmenhorst.

== See also ==
- List of rivers of Lower Saxony
