= Hombach (Ochtum) =

River in Germany

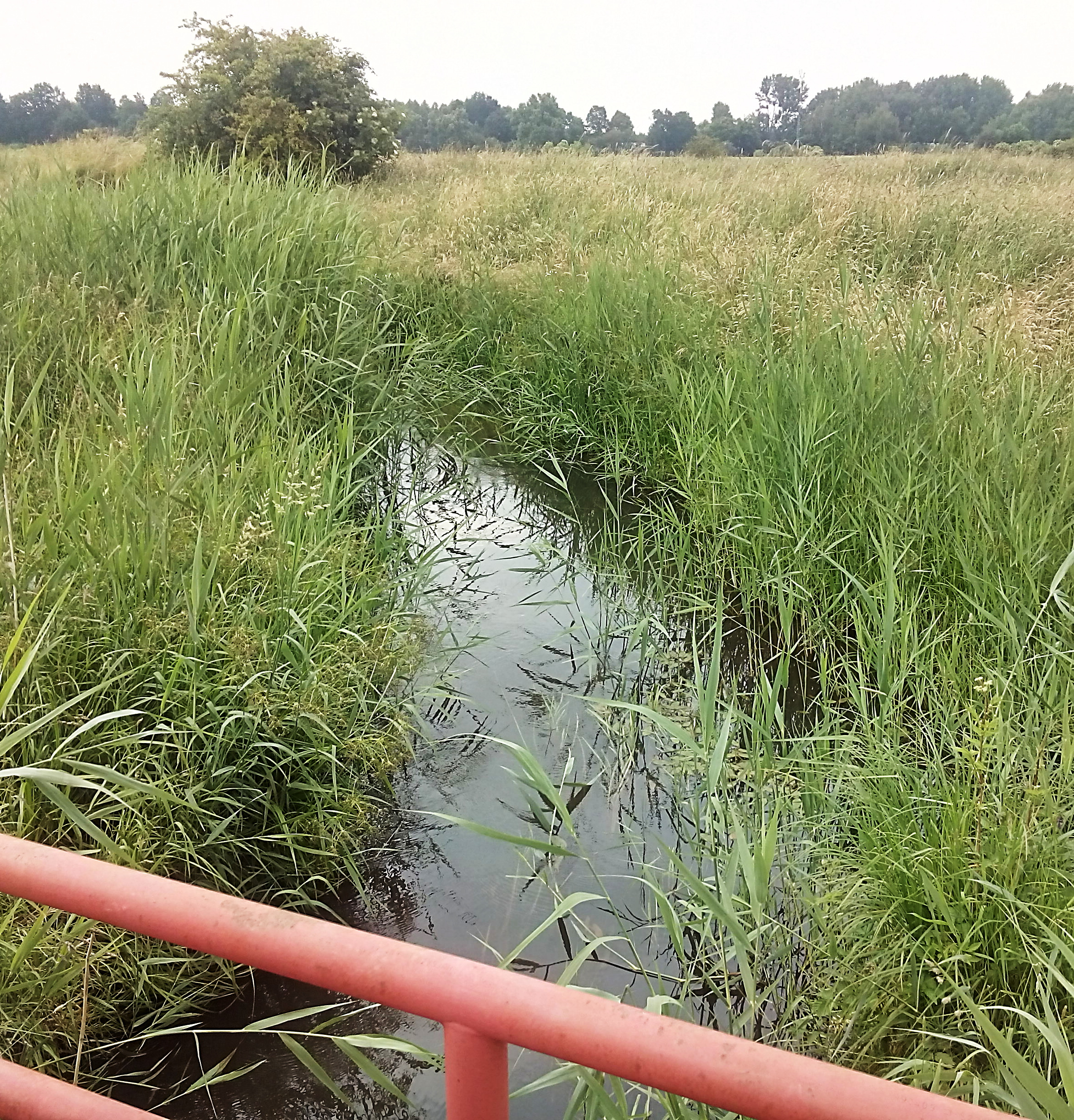

Location
- Country: Germany
- State: Lower Saxony

Physical characteristics
- Mouth
  - location: Ochtum
  - coordinates: 53.0208°N 8.8218°E
- Length: 23.1 km (14.4 mi)

Basin features
- Progression: Ochtum→ Weser→ North Sea

The Hombach (German pronunciation: [ˈhɔmbax]; in its lower course: Leester Mühlenbach) is a river in Lower Saxony, Germany. It is a left tributary of the Ochtum.

== See also ==
- List of rivers of Lower Saxony
