= Syke =

- Town
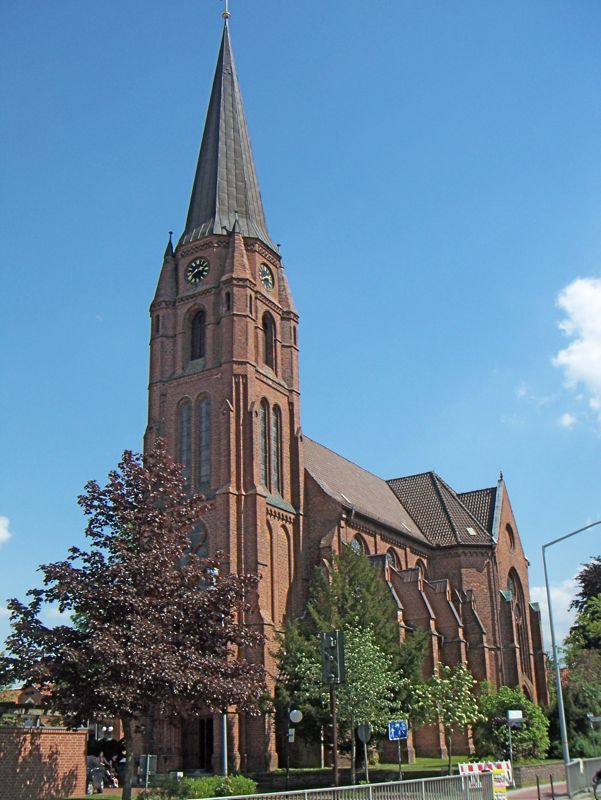
- Lutheran church

- Coat of arms

- Location of Syke within Diepholz district
- Interactive map of Syke
- Location within Germany Location within Lower Saxony
- Coordinates: 52°54′47″N 08°49′37″E
- Country: Germany
- State: Lower Saxony
- District: Diepholz
- Subdivisions: 9 districts

Government
  - Mayor (2021–26): Suse Laue

Area
  - Total: 128.11 km^{2} (49.46 sq mi)
- Elevation: 49 m (161 ft)

Population (2025-12-31)
  - Total: 25,301
  - Density: 197.49/km^{2} (511.51/sq mi)
- Time zone: UTC+01:00 (CET)
  - Summer (DST): UTC+02:00 (CEST)
- Postal codes: 28857
- Dialling codes: 04242
- Vehicle registration: DH, SY
- Website: www.syke.de

Syke (German pronunciation: [ˈziːkə]) is a town in the district of Diepholz, Lower Saxony, Germany. It is situated approximately 20 km south of Bremen.

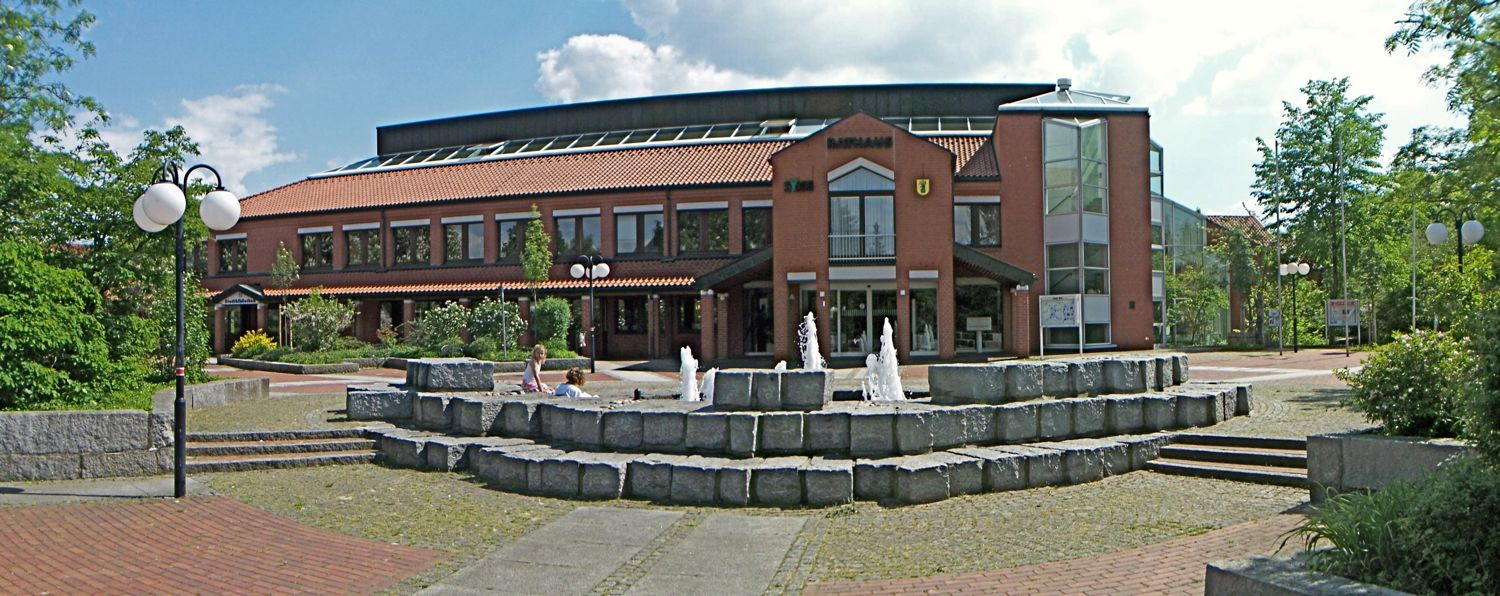
Syke Town Hall

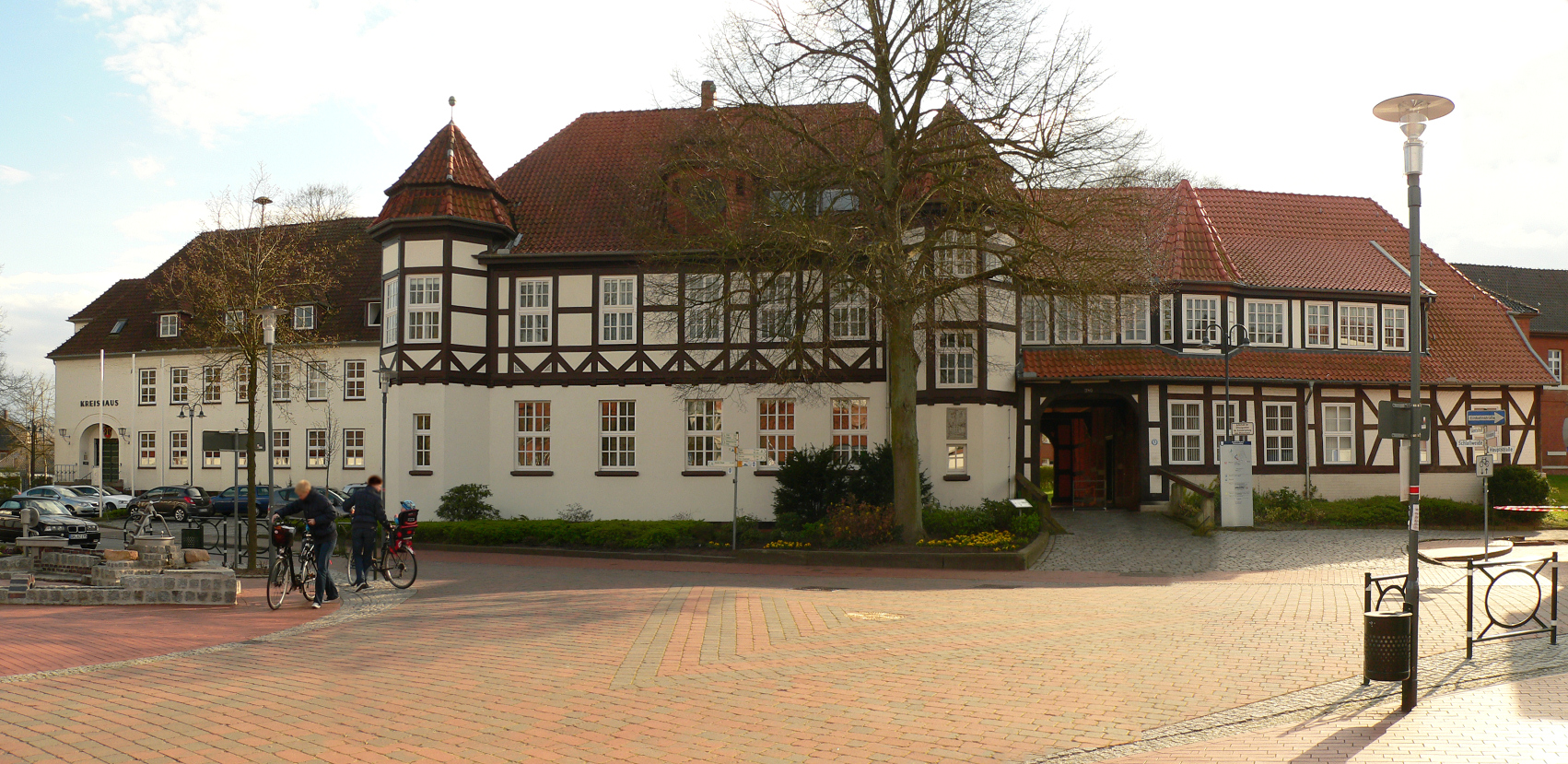
Syke

== Population ==
- 1961: 16,203
- 1970: 17,013
- 1979: 19,413
- 1987: 18,796
- 1992: 21,411
- 1997: 23,340
- 2002: 23,786
- 2007: 24,527
- 2011: 24,279
- 2013: 23,666

== Mayors ==
- 2001–2013: Harald Behrens (FDP)
- since 2013: Suse Laue (SPD)

Suse Laue won the election in 2013, with 54.3% of the vote against three competitors.

== Notable people ==
- Rudi Carrell (1934–2006), Dutch game show host and entertainer; lived 1981–2006 in the district of Wachendorf
- Reinhold Beckmann (born 1956), TV-conductor and football commentator, made his Abitur in Syke
- Baba Saad (born 1985), rapper, lived in Syke from 1994 onwards
- Timo Perthel (born 1989), footballer, played in his youth for the TuS Syke
