= Varreler Bäke =

River in Germany

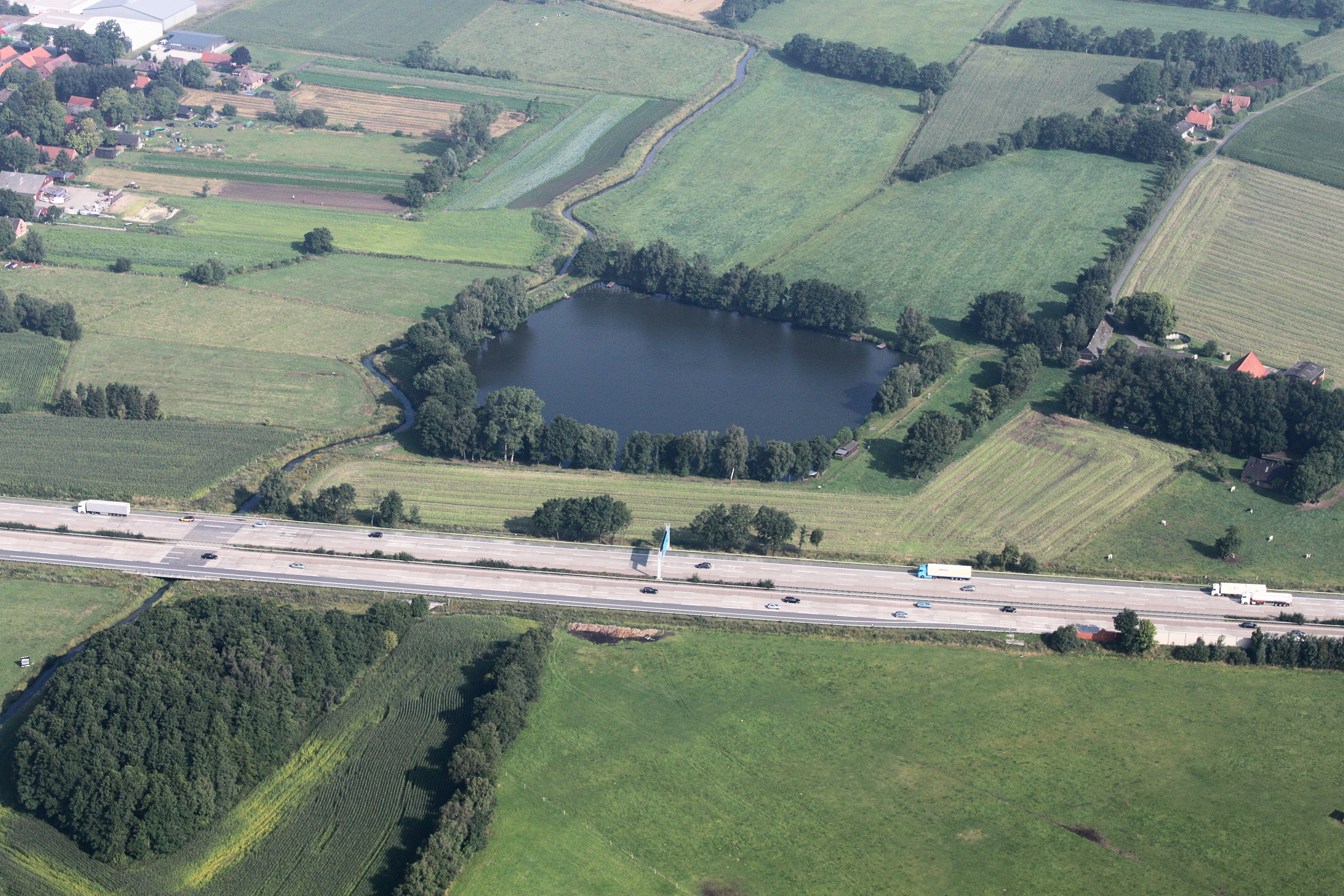

Location
- Country: Germany
- States: Lower Saxony and Bremen

Physical characteristics
- Mouth
  - location: Ochtum
  - coordinates: 53°03′07″N 8°42′24″E
- Length: 41.2 km (25.6 mi)
- Basin size: 217 km^{2} (84 sq mi)

Basin features
- Progression: Ochtum→ Weser→ North Sea

The Varreler Bäke (in its upper course: Klosterbach) is a stream of Lower Saxony and Bremen, Germany.

As Klosterbach it flows south of Bremen on Lower Saxon territory through the villages of Bassum, Kirchseelte and Heiligenrode (a district of Stuhr). From Tölkenbrück (Varrel, a district of Stuhr), the Klosterbach is given the name Varreler Bäke. This then flows for a short distance through the district of Diepholz (Lower Saxony). It then continues through the city-state of Bremen through Huchting and discharges into the Ochtum near the village of Strom.

The Varreler Bäke proper has a length of about 6 km (3.7 mi); together with the Klosterbach it is 41 km (25 mi) long. It is part of the Weser basin.

In Varrel there is still a water mill, witness to the fact that the water power of streams was once used to generate power in order to run corn mills.

== See also ==
- List of rivers of Lower Saxony
- List of rivers of Bremen
