= Ochtum =

River in Germany

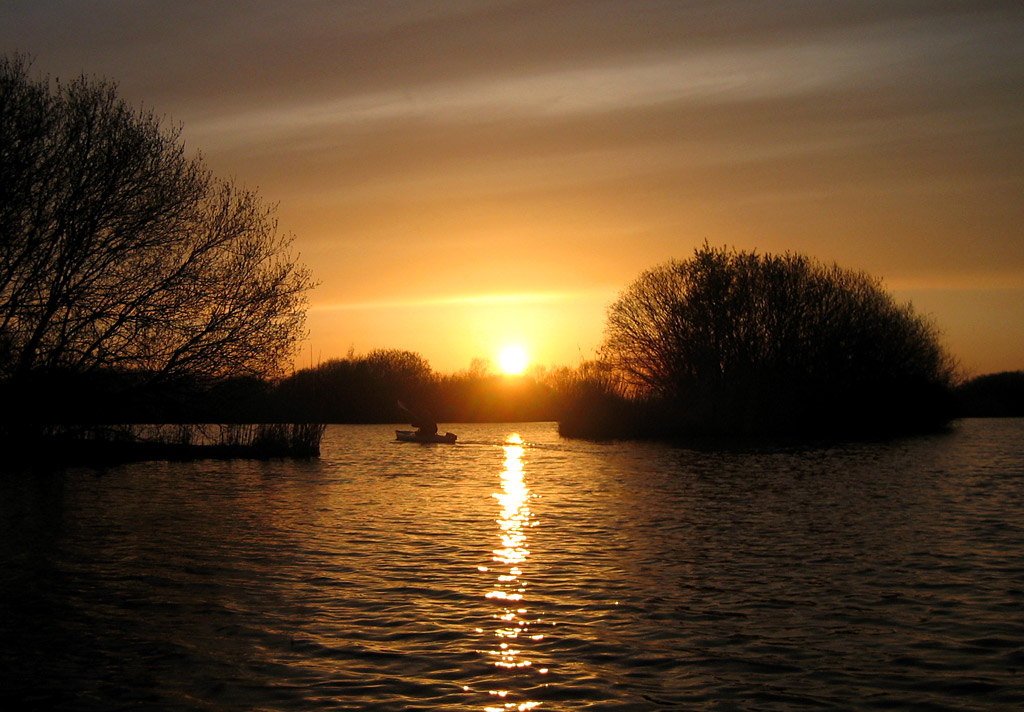
- Sunset over the Ochtum near Bremen

Location
- Country: Germany
- States: Lower Saxony and Bremen

Physical characteristics
- Source
  - location: Source: Confluence of the Hache and Süstedter Bach in the lake Kirchweyher See (in Weyhe)
  - coordinates: 52°59′49″N 8°52′47″E
  - elevation: 5 m
- Mouth
  - location: between Lemwerder-Altenesch and Bremen-Seehausen into the Weser
  - coordinates: 53°07′36″N 8°38′49″E
  - elevation: 2 m
- Length: 25.6 km (15.9 mi)(46.1 km (28.6 mi) incl. Süstedter Bach)
- Basin size: 917 km^{2} (354 sq mi)

Basin features
- Progression: Weser→ North Sea
- Landmarks: Cities: Bremen
- Population: 251000
- Tributaries
  - left: Hombach, Stuhrgraben, Varreler Bäke, Delme

The Ochtum (German pronunciation: [ˈɔxtʊm]) is a river in Lower Saxony and Bremen, Germany. Roughly 26 km (16 mi) long, it is a left tributary of the Weser.

== Course ==
The Ochtum begins in Lower Saxony only a few kilometres south of the city of Bremen near Weyhe at the confluence of the Süstedter Bach and the Hache in the lake known as the Kirchweyher See. The Ochtum forms its tailwater and heads in a northwesterly direction into the state of Bremen where it forms part of its border with Lower Saxony. The river flows through or passes the villages and suburbs of Kattenesch, Huchting and Strom, crosses the Park links der Weser and the Ochtumniederung bei Brokhuchting nature reserve. A second branch of the Ochtum – its original channel – flows north past Grolland and joins the main river in the nature reserve. The Ochtum passes Delmenhorst-Hasbergen and Lemwerder-Deichshausen and discharges into the Weser at river kilometre 12.85 between Lemwerder-Altenesch and Bremen-Seehausen near Unterweser.

== History ==
- 1158 – The Ochtum is first mentioned as the Ochtmund (= Ochtum mouth). Later also recorded as Ochen, Ochtmoni or Oggen.
- 1234 – Battle of Altenesch
- 1400 – First regulations concerning the Ochtum
- 1571 – Breach of the Ochtum dyke
- 1833 – Im Warfelde the Ochtum is diverted along a side channel, which gets rid of a large number of bends. Water flow improves.
- 1881 – During a time of very high water the Middle Weser bursts the dyke near Hoya, so that a large amount of floodwater is led away by the Ochtum.
- 1962 – the depression around the Ochtum is completely flooded by the North Sea on 16/17 February and Bremen is separated from the district of Bremen-Huchting. In Huchting several people die in the allotments occupied by folk whose homes had been bombed during the war.
- 28 January 1966 – An aeroplane belonging to the German airline Lufthansa crashes near the Ochtum after an aborted landing at Bremen Airport. All 46 passengers and crew are killed. See Lufthansa Flight 005.
- 1973 – In November and December 1973 several storm surges cause serious damage in the area between the mouth and Huchting. One person dies.
- 1976 – In January two very severe storm surges cause heavy damage between Huchting and the mouth of the Ochtum. During the storm surge of 3 January 1976 water levels are reached similar to those experienced in the floods of February 1962.
- 2 June 1976 – Completion of the Ochtum Barrage near Altenesch, for which the Lower Saxon State Department for Waterways, Coastal and Nature Conservation (Niedersächsische Landesbetrieb für Wasserwirtschaft, Küsten- and Naturschutz or NLWKN) is responsible. The old port on the Ochtum is moved to its present location below the Ochtum barrage.
- 1989/1990 – Diversion of a 5.4 km (3.4 mi) long section of the Ochtum through the Park links der Weser, so that the runway at Bremen Airport can be fully utilised. The roughly 5 km (3.1 mi) long old branch of the Ochtum north of Grolland is left in place.

=== Water quality ===
According to the 2000 water quality map by the state of Bremen the Ochtum is classified as Class II, moderately polluted, as far as the district of Bremen-Strom.

== Economy ==
=== Importances as a transport route ===
The Ochtum is used by water sports clubs. The paths on the Ochtum dykes are popular with cyclists and inline skaters.

== See also ==
- List of rivers of Bremen
- List of rivers of Lower Saxony
