= Weser =

River in Germany

Weser Werser (Low German)
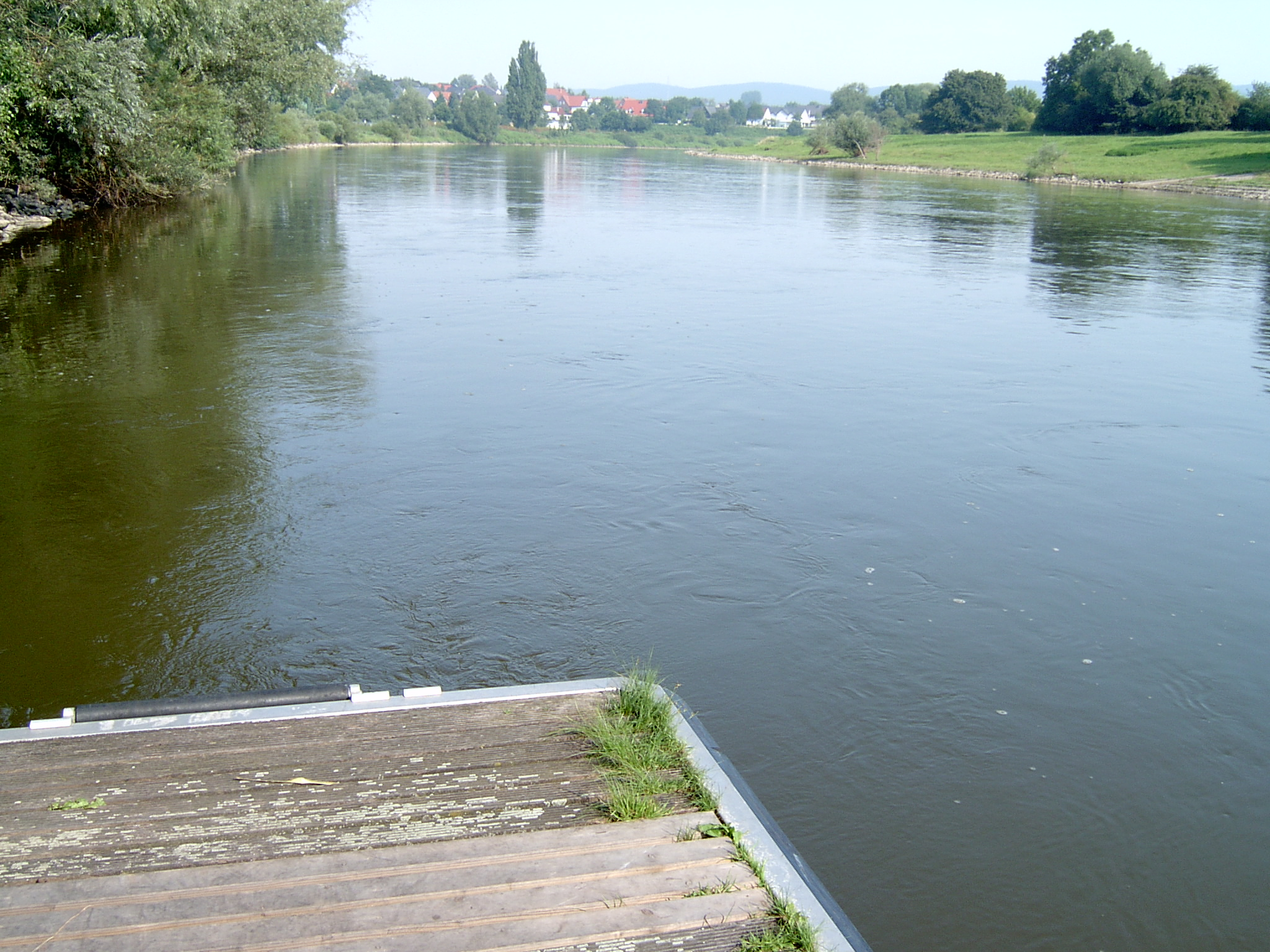
- The Weser near Bad Oeynhausen

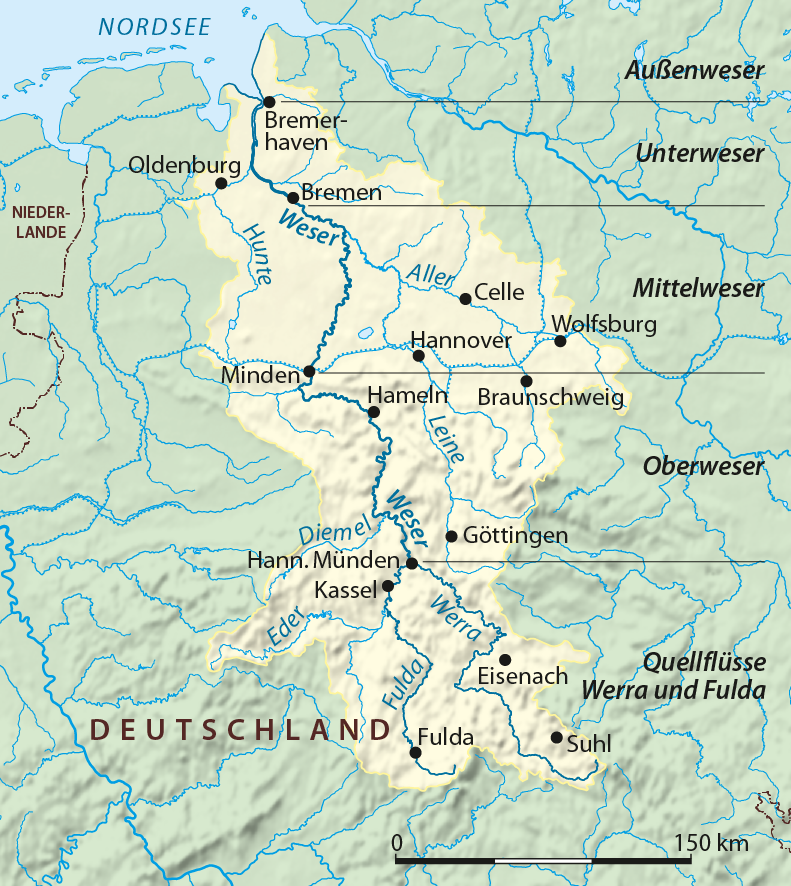
- Watershed of the Weser

- European context: mouth within Germany.
- Etymology: *waisōn, Proto-Germanic, meaning "flow" or "ooze"

Location
- Country: Germany
- States: Bremen; Lower Saxony; North Rhine-Westphalia; Thuringia; Hesse
- Cities: Bremerhaven; Bremen; Minden; Hamelin; Hann. Münden; Kassel; Fulda

Physical characteristics
- Source
  - location: Confluence of the Fulda and Werra Rivers in Hann. Münden
  - coordinates: 51°25′17″N 9°38′53″E
  - elevation: 116 m (381 ft)
- Mouth: Wadden Sea of the North Sea
  - location: Between Bremerhaven and Nordenham
  - coordinates: 53°32′8″N 8°33′56″E
  - elevation: 0 m (0 ft)
- Length: 452 km (281 mi) [744 km (462 mi) if combined with the Werra]
- Basin size: 46,306 km^{2} (17,879 sq mi)
- Discharge
  - average: 327 m^{3}/s (11,500 cu ft/s)

Basin features
- River system: Weser basin
- Tributaries
  - left: Diemel, Emmer, Werre, Große Aue, Hunte
  - right: Aller, Lesum

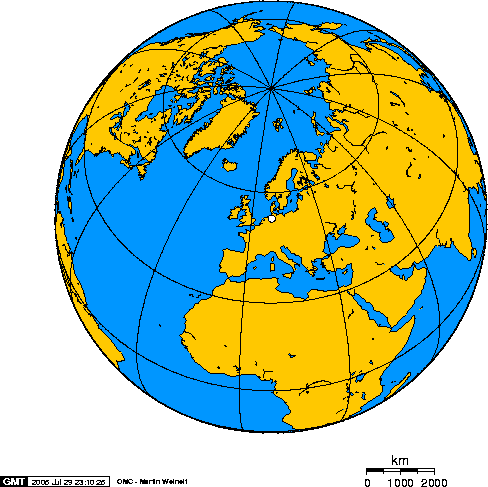

The Weser (pronounced [ˈveːzɐ]) is the longest river wholly in Germany. The Weser flows from the Thuringian Forest to the North Sea, where it flows into the sea near Bremerhaven.

The Weser begins at Hannoversch Münden through the confluence of the Werra and Fulda. It passes through the Hanseatic city of Bremen. Its mouth is 50 km (31 mi) further north opposite the ports of Bremerhaven and Nordenham. The latter is on the Butjadingen Peninsula. It then merges into the North Sea via two highly saline, estuarine mouths.

It connects to the canal network running east–west across the North German Plain.

The river, when combined with the Werra (a dialectal form of Weser), is 744 km (462 mi) long and thus, the longest river entirely situated within Germany (the Main, however, is the longest if the Weser-Werra are considered separate). The Weser itself is 452 km (281 mi) long. The Werra rises in Thuringia, the German state south of the main projection (tongue) of Lower Saxony.

== Etymology ==
"Weser" and "Werra" are the same words in different dialects. The difference reflects the old linguistic border between Central and Low German, passing through Hannoversch Münden.

The name likely derives from the Old Germanic *waisōn "flow, ooze". It is cognate with the Wear in England and Vistula (Polish Wisła, German Weichsel) in Poland, all of which are derived from the Proto-Indo-European root *weys- "to flow", which also gives rise to Old English/Old Frisian wāse "mud, ooze", Old Norse veisa "slime, stagnant pool", Dutch waas "haze; soggy land" (see Waasland), Old Saxon waso "wet ground, mire", Old High German wasal "rain", and French vase "mud, sludge".

== Course ==
The Weser starts at the confluence of the Fulda and the Werra. It then runs down to the Porta Westfalica between two high hill ranges, the ⁣⁣Wiehengebirge⁣⁣ in the west and the Weserbergland in the east.

Between Minden and the North Sea, the river has been largely canalised up to a limit of 1,200-ton ships. Eight hydroelectric dams stand at the ends of adjacent weir streams that make up the river. The navigation is linked west to the Dortmund–Ems Canal via the Coastal Canal. It is linked east at Bremerhaven to the Elbe.

A large reservoir, the Edersee, on the Eder, the main tributary of the Fulda, is used to allow enough water depth for shipping year-round. The dam, built in 1914, was bombed and severely damaged by British aircraft in May 1943, causing great destruction and about 70 deaths downstream. It was rebuilt within four months. The reservoir is a major summer resort area. Turbines driven by its sluices provide electricity.

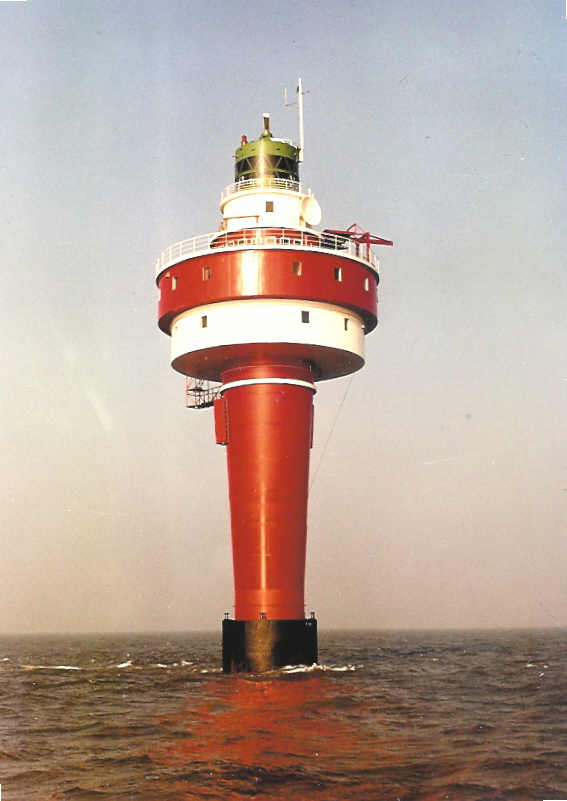
Alte Weser Lighthouse

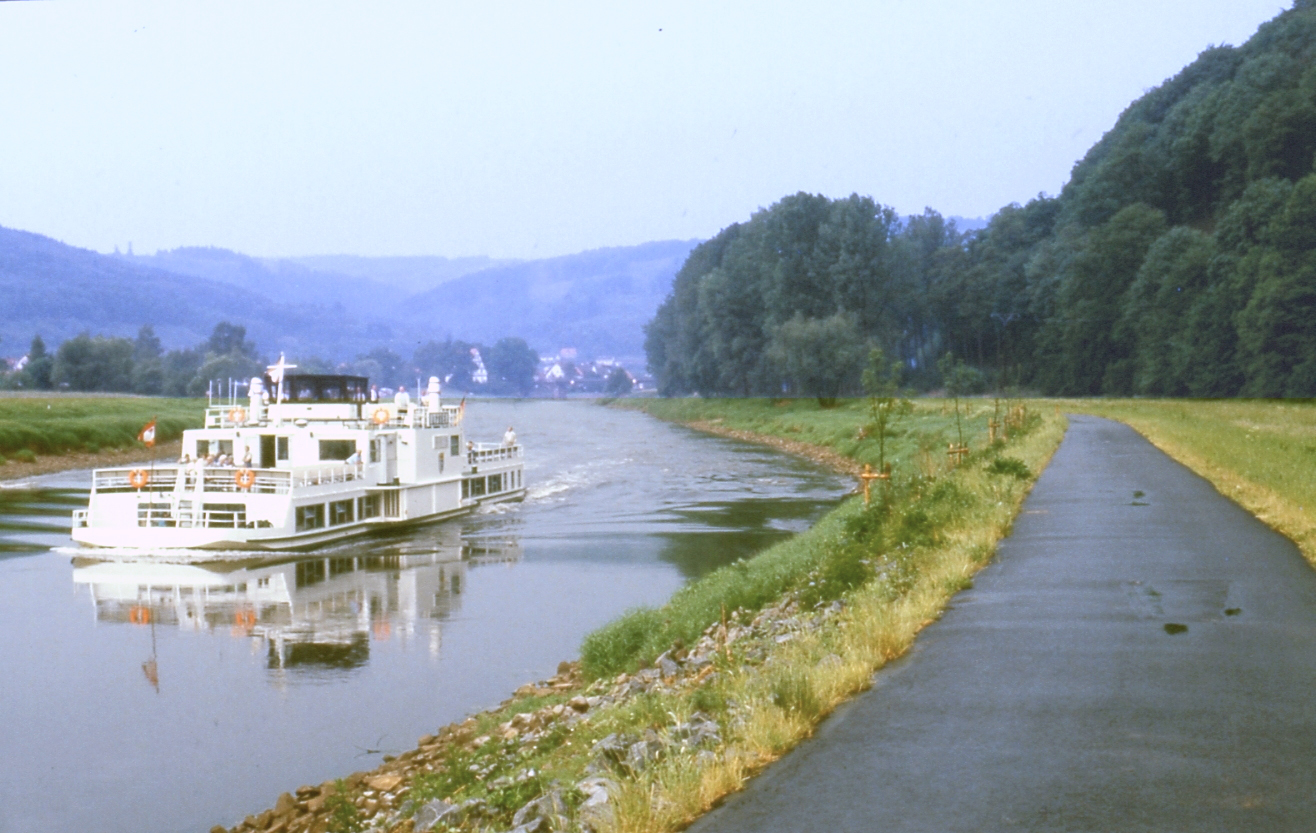
"Upper" Weser, in reality the central section between the upper courses Werra and Fulda, and the lowland section

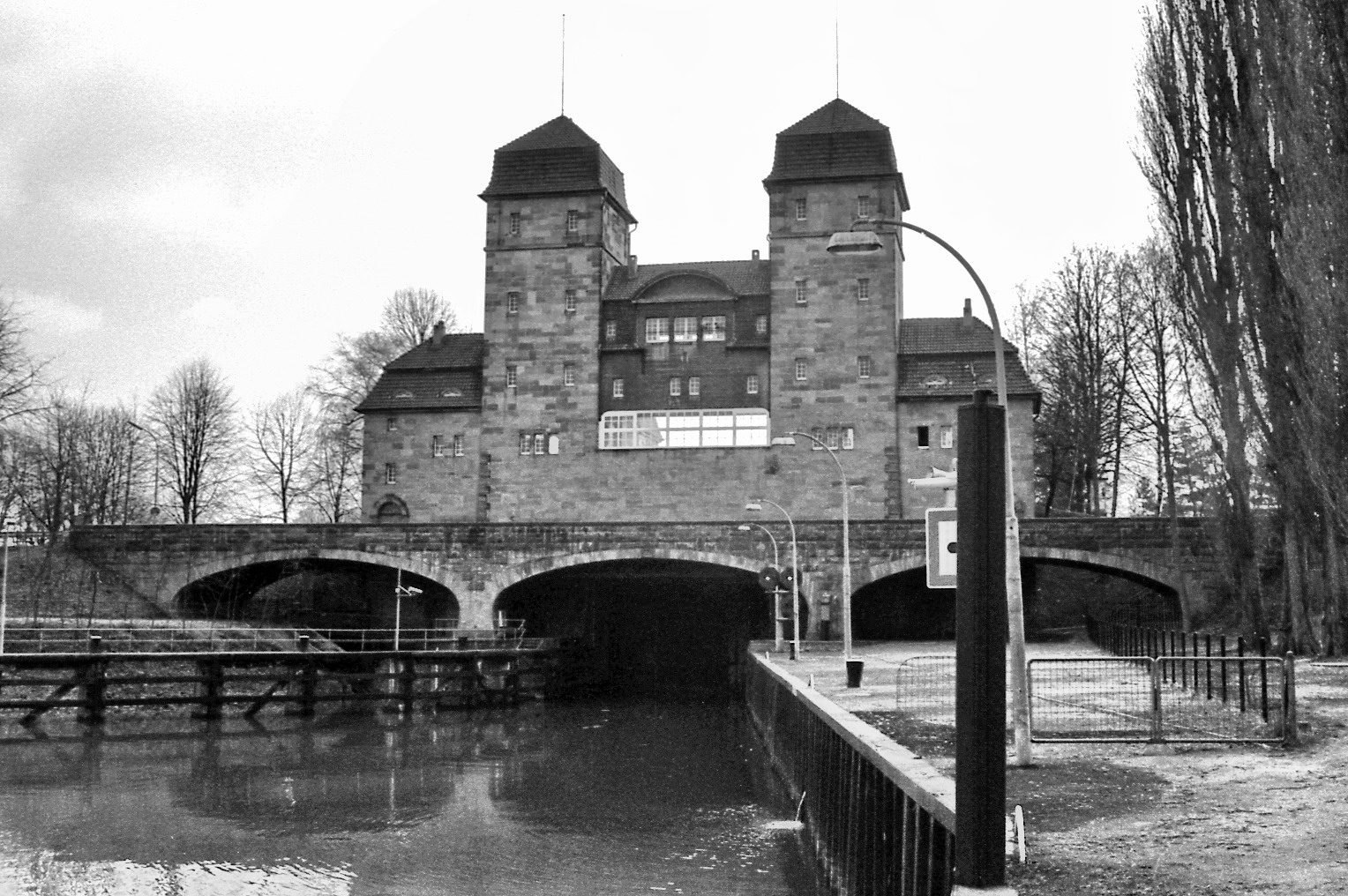
Mittelland Canal/River Weser Lock in Minden taken in 1977

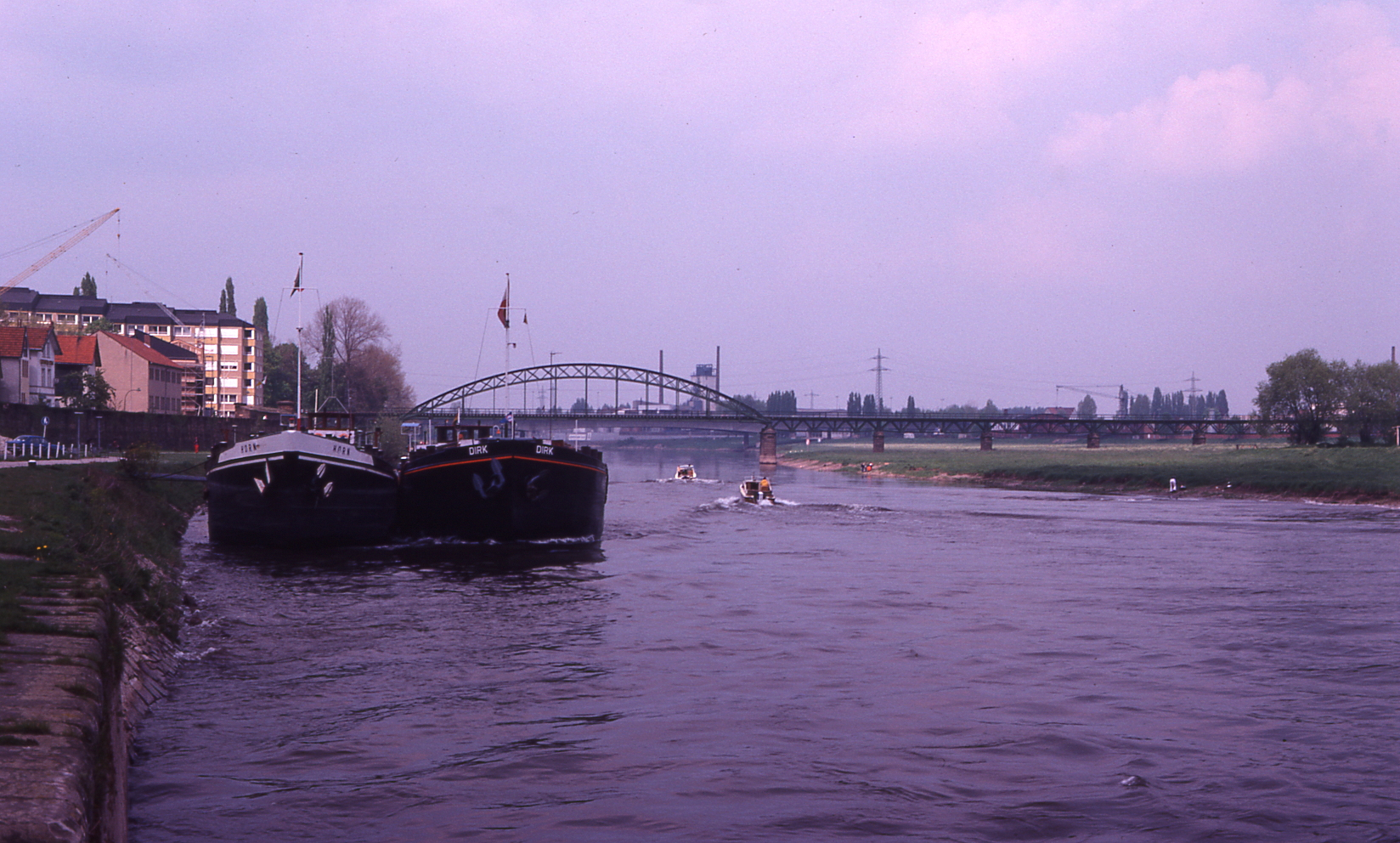
View north of the River Weser and the road bridge at Minden

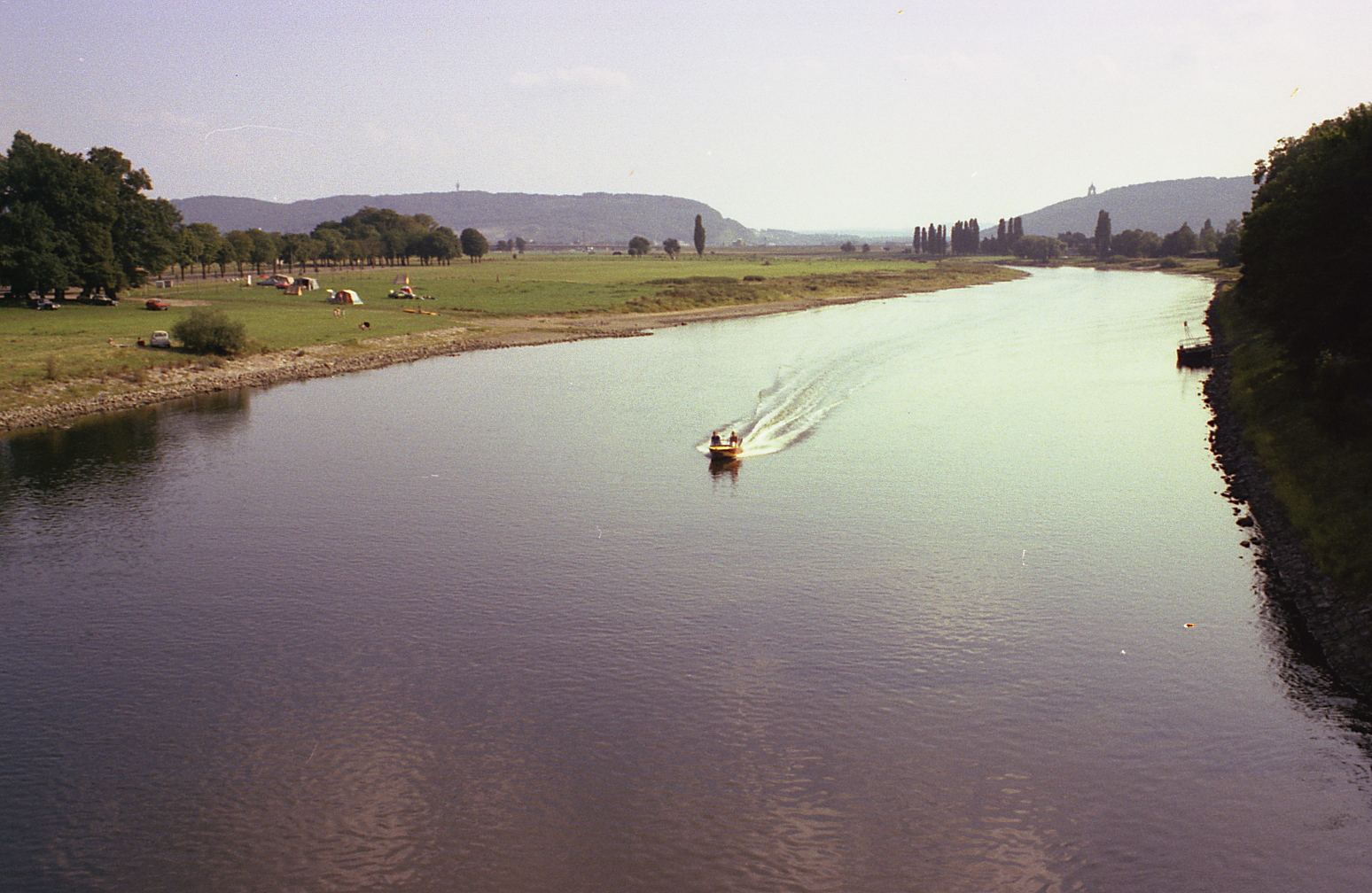
Southern view of the River Weser from the road bridge at Minden in 1977

The Weser enters the North Sea in the southernmost part of the German Bight. In the sea it splits into two arms –the riverbed at the end of the last ice age. These sea arms are called Alte Weser (old Weser) and Neue Weser (new Weser). They are the waterways for ships heading for the ports of Bremerhaven, Nordenham, and Bremen. The Alte Weser Lighthouse marks the northernmost point of the Weser. This replaced the Roter Sand Lighthouse in 1964.

== Weser deepening ==
Since the 19th century, the Weser has been deepened twelve times by humans. This caused severe ecological damage to the river.

With each deepening, the tides were altered by the faster inflow of North Sea tides. This increases the risk of flooding along the river.

== Tributaries ==
The largest tributary of the Weser is the Aller, which joins south of Bremen. Tributaries of the Weser and the Werra (from source to mouth) are:

Modes of the list:

- Listed upstream, but sides seen with the flow
- Distances ("km …") from the hydrographical limit towards the sea
  - "II", "III"and "IV" mark distances of secondary/tertiary tributaries from the confluence with the Weser etc.
- After the names, lengths and basin sizes are given.
- Lengths with longer affluents are given behind the slash lengths including an upper course with another name with "or"

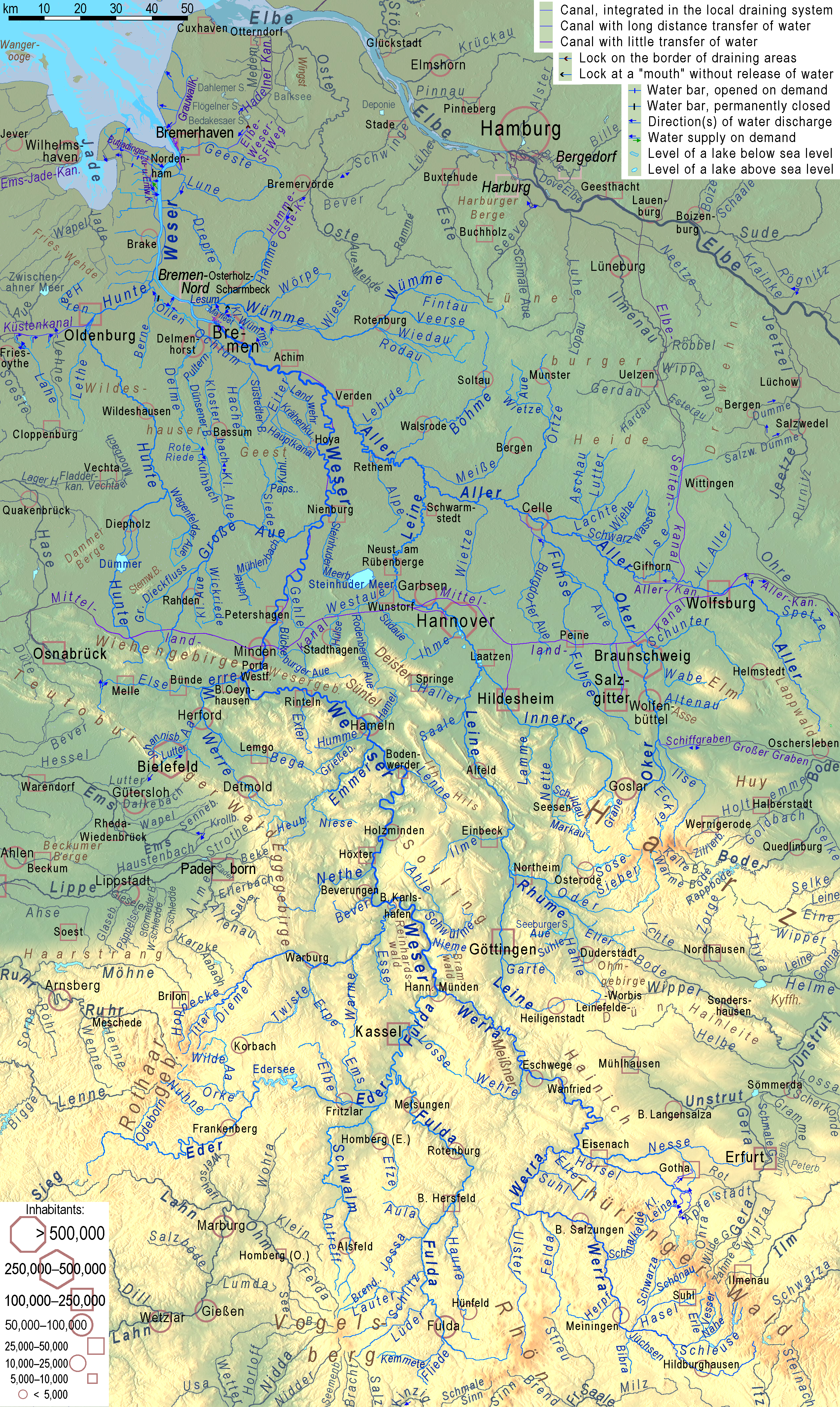
Weser and its tributaries in blue, other rivers in grey

List:

- km 19, right: Geeste (in Bremerhaven), 42.5 km, 338 km^{2}
- km 33, right: Lune, 43 km, 383 km^{2}
- km 35.9, right: Drepte, 37.6 km, 101 km^{2}
- km 52.8, left: Hunte, 189 km, 2.785 km^{2}
  - II: km 125.7: Lake Dümmer
- km 67.6, right: Lesum, 9.9 or 131.5, 2,188 km^{2}
  - II: km 9.9, right Hamme, 48.5 km, 549 km^{2}
  - ↑ main stream: Wümme, 118 / 120, 1,585 km^{2}
- km 72.5, left: Ochtum, 25.6 or 45 km, 917 km^{2}
  - II: km 25.6: left Hache, 33 km, 118 km^{2}
- km 125.6, right: Aller, 260 km, 15,744 km^{2}
  - II: km 63.6, left: Leine, 278 km, 5,617 km^{2}, stronger than river Aller above
    - III: km 112.7, right: Innerste, 99.7 km, 1,264 km^{2}
    - III: km 192.8, right: Rhume, 44 km, 1,193 km^{2}, stronger than river Leine above
    - IV: km 15.6, right: Oder, 56 km, 385 km^{2}, headwater of the strongest waterway of Aller system
  - II: km 97.3, right: Örtze, 62 / 70 km, 760 km^{2}
  - II: km 140.7, left: Oker, 218 km, 1822 km^{2}, stronger than river Aller above
- km 184.6, right: Steinhuder Meerbach
  - ↑ km II: 29 lake Steinhuder Meer
- km 188.7, left: Große Aue, 84.5 km, 1,522 km^{2}
- km 261.3, left: Werre, 71.9 km, 1485 km^{2}
  - II: km 12.7, left: Else, 34.6 km, 416 km^{2}, branch of the Hase, an affluent of Ems
- km 287.7, left: Exter, 26.1 km, 109 km^{2}
- km 323.3, left: Emmer, 61.8 km, 535 km^{2}
- km 387.5, left: Nethe, 50.4 km, 460 km^{2}
- km 406.5, left: Diemel, 110.5 km, 1,762 km^{2}
- km 451.5, left: Fulda, 220.4 km, 6.947 km^{2}

II: km 45.3, left: Eder, 176.1 km, 3,361 km^{2}, headwater of the strongest waterway of Weser system

III: km 17.1, left: Schwalm, 97.1 km, 1.299 km^{2}
↑ III: km 49.4–70.5: Edersee reservoir

II: 120.1, right: Haune, 66.5 km, 500 km^{2}

- ↑ main stream above km 451.5: Werra, 299.6 km, 5.497 km^{2}
- km 566.5, right: Hörsel, 55.2 or 64.3, 784 km^{2}
  - km 9.8, right: Nesse, 54.5 km, 426 km^{2}
- km 513.1, left: Ulster, 57.2 km, 421 km^{2}
- km 604.4, right: Schleuse, 34.2 km, 283 km^{2}

== Notable towns ==
Main towns along the Weser are (from the head of the river to its mouth): Hann. Münden, Beverungen, Höxter, Holzminden, Bodenwerder, Hamelin, Hessisch Oldendorf, Rinteln, Vlotho, Bad Oeynhausen, Porta Westfalica, Minden, Petershagen, Nienburg, Achim, Bremen, Brake, Nordenham, and Bremerhaven.

== Popular culture ==
The river features in the legend and folk tale the Pied Piper of Hamelin.
