= Landwehr (disambiguation) =

Landwehr is the German word for a type of national home guard or territorial army. It may also refer to:

== Geography ==
- Landwehr, Lower Saxony, Germany, a municipality
- Landwehr (Golßen), a village in the borough of Golßen, Brandenburg, Germany
- Landwehr (Halver), a farmstead in the borough of Halver, North Rhine-Westphalia, Germany
- Landwehr (Menden), a village in the borough of Menden, Sauerland, Germany
- Landwehr (Quarnbek), a village in the municipality of Quarnbek in Schleswig-Holstein, Germany
- Landwehr (Radevormwald), part of Radevormwald in North Rhine-Westphalia, Germany
- Landwehr, until 1938 Geswethen, a county of Insterburg, East Prussia, since 1946: Nagornoje, a settlement in Chernyakhovsky District, Kaliningrad Oblast, Russia
- Kirchwehrener Landwehr, a stream in Hanover Region, Germany
- Landwehr (Wachau), a woodland in Wachau, Saxony near Radeberg, Saxony, Germany

== Fortifications and borders ==
- Landwehr (border), a medieval border demarcation or fortified border around a settlement or territory in Europe
- Landwehr (Astengebiet), a series of fortifications around the Kahler Asten in the county of Hochsauerlandkreis, Germany

== People ==
- Landwehr (surname)
