= Freden (Samtgemeinde) =

Coordinates: 51.933°N 9.900°E

Freden is a former Samtgemeinde ("collective municipality") in the district of Hildesheim, in Lower Saxony, Germany. Its seat was in the village Freden. On 1 November 2016 it was dissolved.

The Samtgemeinde Freden consisted of the following municipalities:

1. Everode
2. Freden
3. Landwehr
4. Winzenburg
