= Landwehr (surname) =

Landwehr is a German language surname.

== List of people with the surname ==
- Albrecht Landwehr, German politician
- Achim Landwehr (born 1968), German historian
- Andreas Landwehr (born 1959), German journalist
- Brenda Landwehr (Born 1955), American politician
- Gordian Landwehr (1912–1998), German Dominican prior
- Gottfried Landwehr (1929–2013), German physicist
- Hermann Landwehr (1884–1955), German lawyer and ministerial official
- Johann Landwehr (recorded around 1658–1670), German artist, son of Jürgen
- Jürgen Landwehr (ca. 1580–1646) German artist
- Karl-Heinrich Landwehr (born 1935), German company lawyer
- Ludwig Landwehr (1897–1981), German politician
- Lutz Landwehr von Pragenau (born 1963), German composer
- Mathis Landwehr (born 1980), German actor
- Nate Landwehr (born 1980), American Mixed Martial Artist
- Richard Landwehr, author of books about the Waffen-SS
- Wilma Landwehr (1913–1981), German politician
