= Kirchwehrener Landwehr =

River in Germany

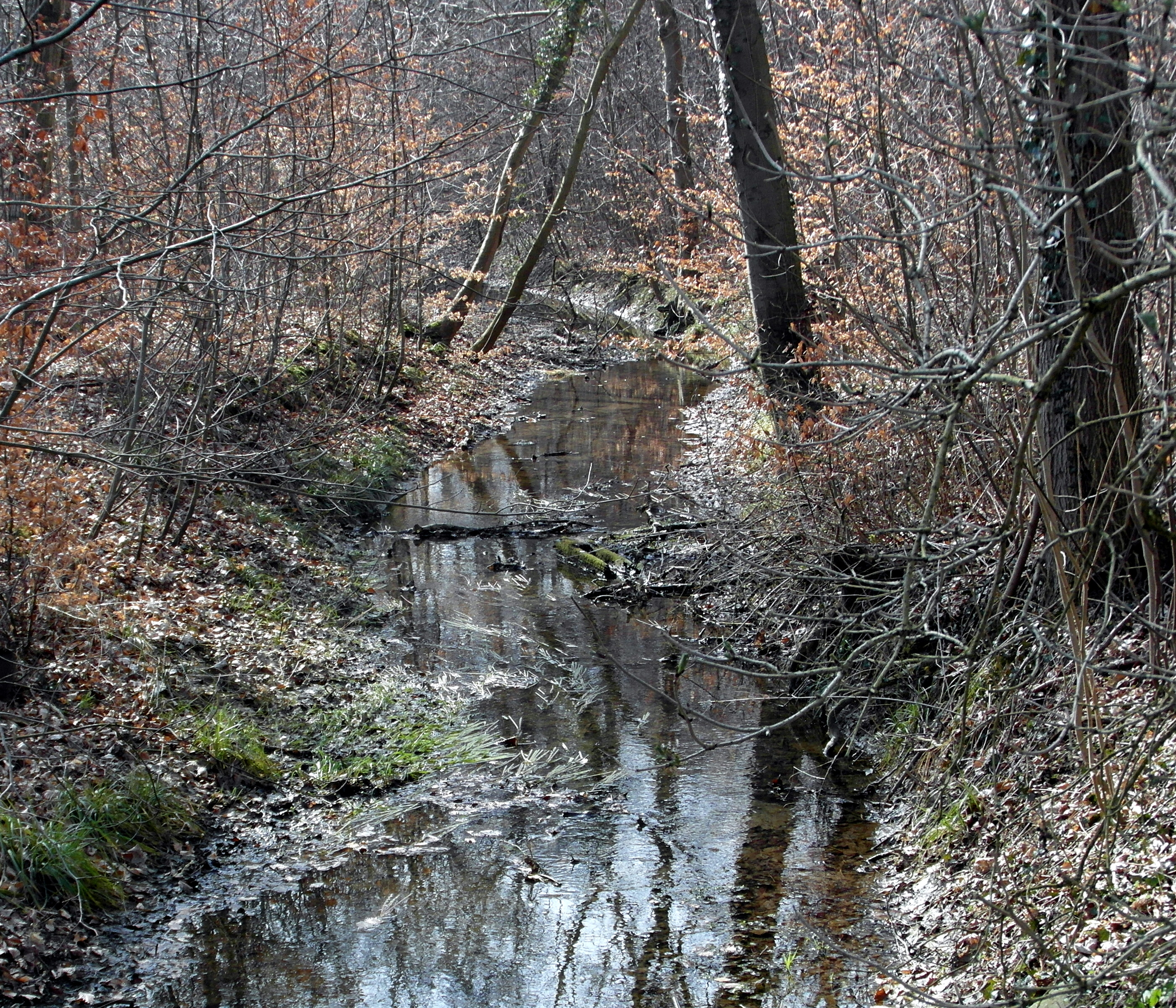

Location
- Country: Germany
- States: Lower Saxony

Physical characteristics
- Mouth
  - location: Möseke
  - coordinates: 52°21′41″N 9°28′33″E

Basin features
- Progression: Möseke→ Südaue→ Westaue→ Leine→ Aller→ Weser→ North Sea

Kirchwehrener Landwehr is a small river of Lower Saxony, Germany. It flows into the Möseke northeast of Barsinghausen.

== See also ==
- List of rivers of Lower Saxony
