= Möseke =

River in Germany

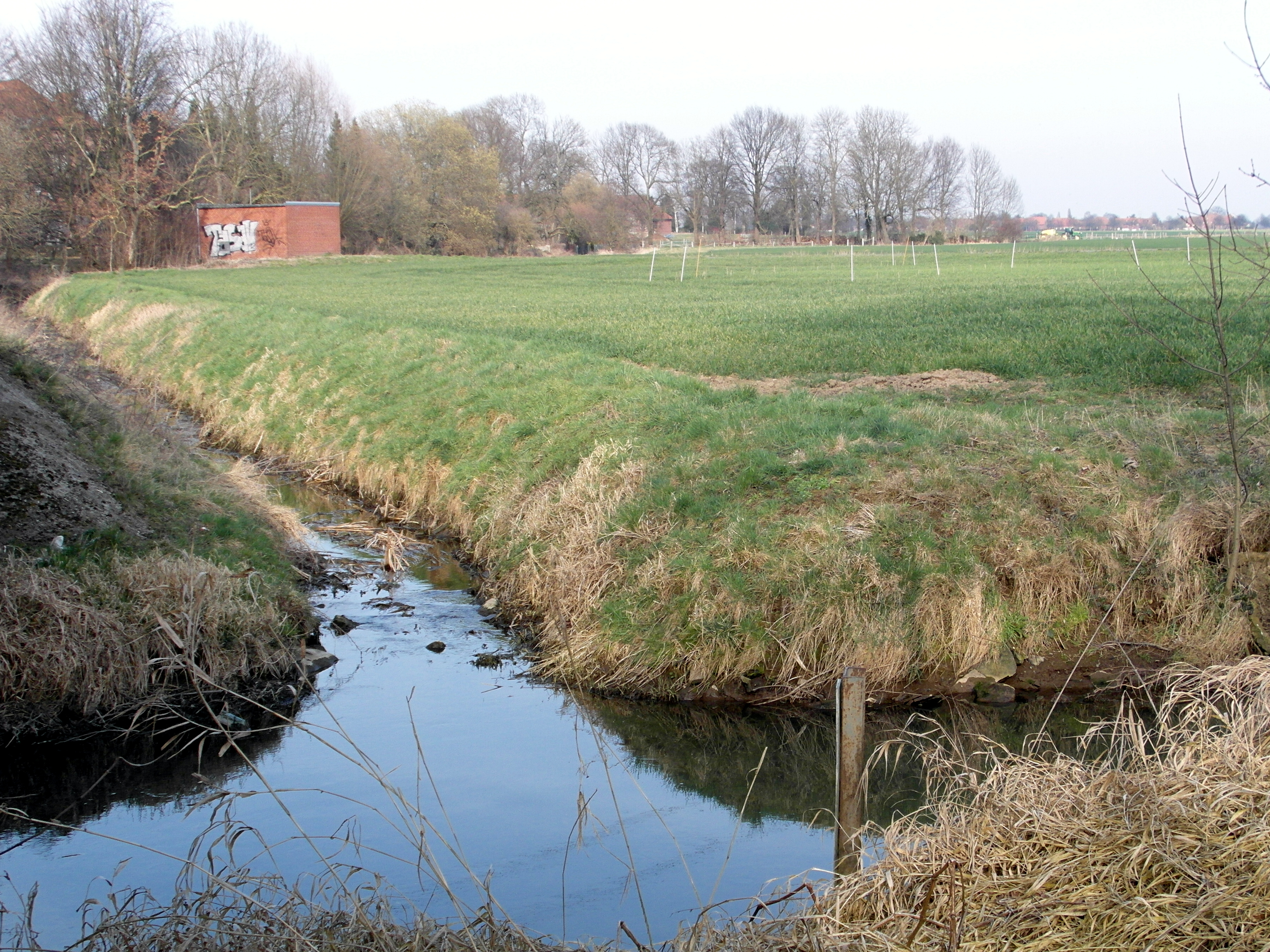

Location
- Country: Germany
- State: Lower Saxony

Physical characteristics
- Mouth
  - location: Südaue
  - coordinates: 52.3614°N 9.4759°E
- Length: 16.1 km (10.0 mi)

Basin features
- Progression: Südaue→ Westaue→ Leine→ Aller→ Weser→ North Sea

Möseke (also: Mösecke, in its upper course Haferriede) is a river of Lower Saxony, Germany. It flows into the Südaue north of Barsinghausen.

== See also ==
- List of rivers of Lower Saxony
