= Andreas Landwehr =

German journalist

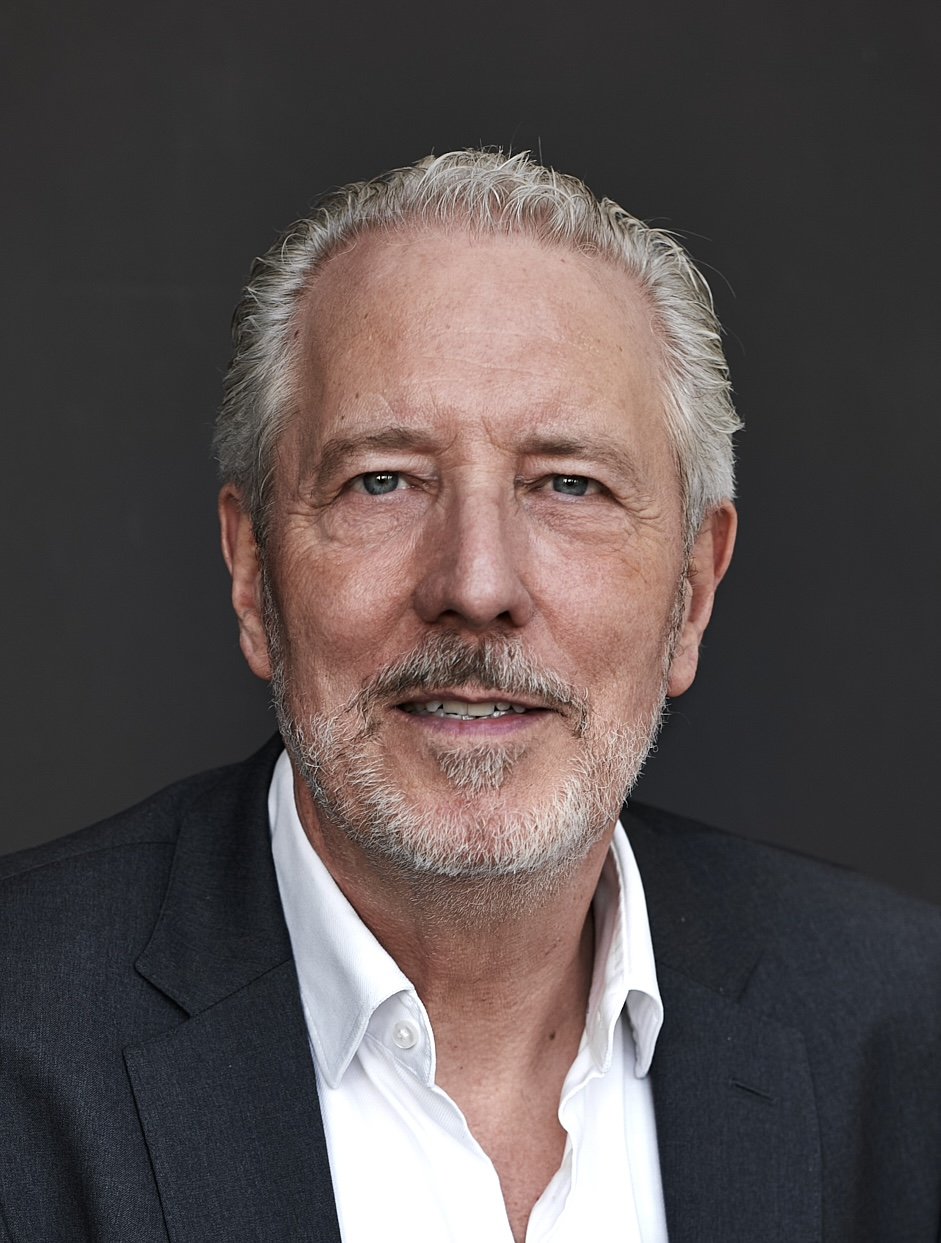
2025

Andreas Landwehr (born 22 March 1959) is a German journalist. Since 1993 he has been the German Press Agency bureau chief in Beijing. He was the winner, in 2011, of the Reetsma Liberty Award for journalistic freedom and independence.

At the award ceremony his work was the subject of an enthusiastic tribute from the BBC's John Simpson: he was described as "an everyday hero [with a journalistic focus on] freedom and human rights", his reporting driven by "journalistic principals" unencumbered by restrictive preconceptions.

== Life ==
Andreas Landwehr was born in Düsseldorf. He attended the Alexander von Humboldt Gymnasium (secondary school) in nearby Neuss. Between 1978 and 1983 he studied Chinese at Tapei and Bonn, where he received his degree. He joined the German Press Agency (Deutsche Presse-Agentur / dpa) in 1984. Between 1985 and 1990 he worked at the dpa head office in Hamburg, West Germany, where as "domestic affairs editor" ("Inlandsredakteur") he reported, from the west, on the unfolding changes that would lead to reunification. By the time reunification took place, however, he had been posted to Washington, D.C. from where, as a foreign correspondent, he reported in the Gulf War and, two years later, on Bill Clinton's successful bid for the presidency.

Since 1993 Landwehr has been the German Press Agency bureau chief in Beijing, from where he is responsible for reporting on Taiwan, Hong Kong, Mongolia and, most importantly, China.

News highlights on which Landwehr has reported during his time in East Asia have included the death of Deng Xiaoping along with the return of Hong Kong and Macau to China in 1997 and 1999. Other important themes have been the gradual democratization of Taiwan and the buildup to China's admission to the WTO. He was in Beijing for the SARS outbreak in 2002/03 and for the Summer Olympics in 2008. That was also the year in which he reported on the intensifying unrest in Tibet and on the Sichuan earthquake, also reporting nine years later on its 2017 echo. He has interviewed many of the top Chinese leaders, such as Jiang Zemin, Zhu Rongji and Wen Jiabao. But he has also interviewed high-profile Chinese dissidents, including Bao Tong, Wang Dan and Wu'erkaixi. Landwehr has travelled extensively in China, getting to know the country: he has been able to visit Tibet several times. He has also undertaken a series of visits to North Korea.

As part of a dpa reorganisation in 2013 he took over the headship for the Press Agency's newly created East Asia Regional Network, meaning that his reporting remit also now embraces Japan and South Korea.

Andreas Landwehr is a member of the German Press Agency's G20 team, reporting from the annual G20 summits on the East Asian statesmen and political leaders participating, development issues arising and Aid agency involvement.

== Family connection ==
Andreas Landwehr's father was one of twelve children. An uncle, Gordian Landwehr, joined the Dominican Order in 1932 and moved to the German Democratic Republic in 1951, achieving prominence as a leading figure in the East German Roman Catholic church hierarchy.
