= Colossus of Ostermunzel =

Glacial erratic stone found in Ostermunzel, Germany

Coordinates: 52.37676°N 9.50202°E

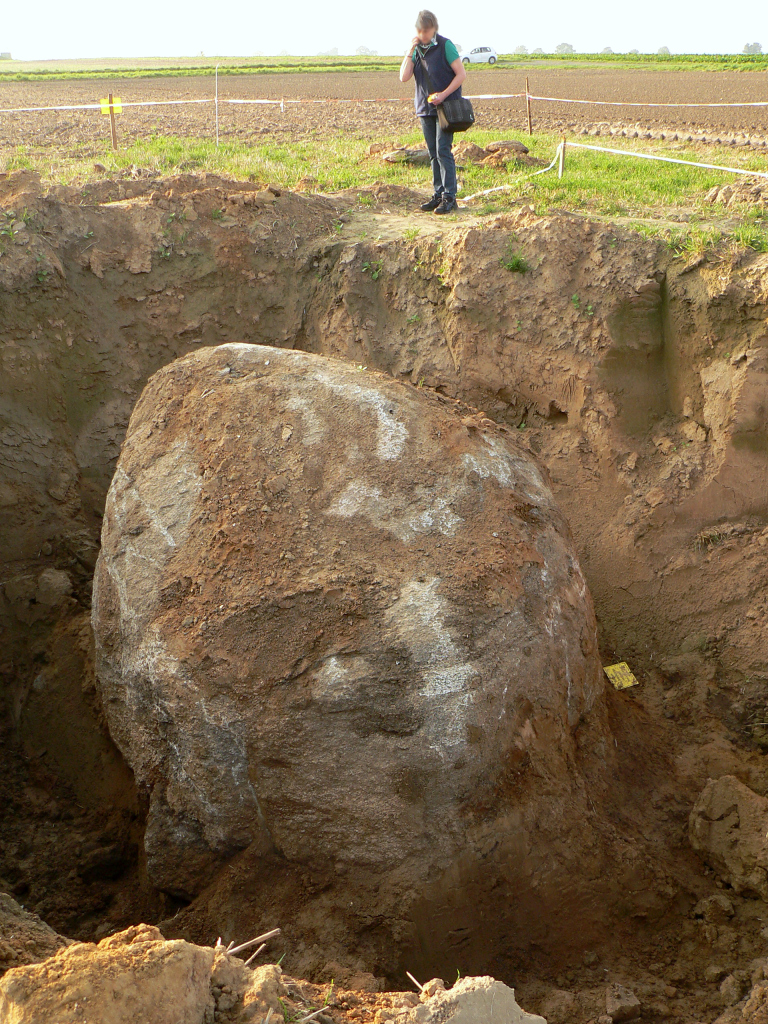
Colossus of Ostermunzel during excavation in August 2014

The Colossus of Ostermunzel is a 27.5-tonne (61,000 lb) glacial erratic stone found in a farmer's field east of Ostermunzel in Lower Saxony, Germany, in 2013. It was excavated and moved to a new location about a kilometre (0.62 mi) away.

== Location, discovery and excavation ==
This glacial erratic, a piece of rock that differs from the size and type of rock native to the area in which it rests, was found by a farmer who was ploughing his land in 2013. The field in which it was discovered lies on a small hill near the district road K 253 between Ostermunzel and Dedensen. Upon discovering it, the owner of the field informed local authorities in accordance with the Lower Saxon natural protection law that discoveries of rocks that are more than 2 metres (6 ft 7 in) across must be reported. The Hanover Region objected to its planned demolition.

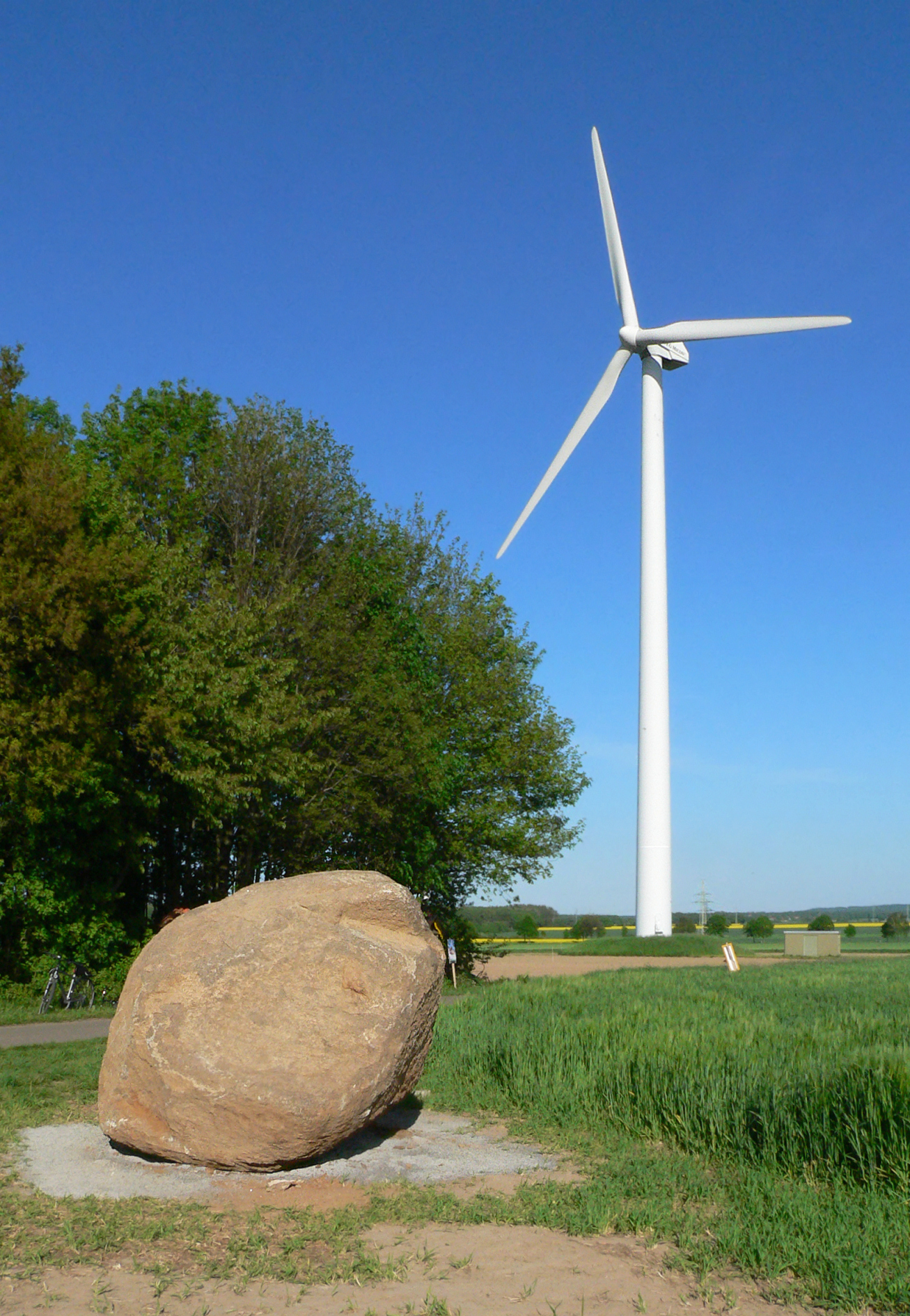
Colossus of Ostermunzel at new location

A preliminary investigation and assessment by Heinz-Gerd Röhling of the State Office of Mining, Energy and Geology (Landesamt für Bergbau, Energie und Geologie) found that the stone qualified as a natural monument. Its large size is abnormal, particularly for northern Germany and especially for Lower Saxony. Due to the estimated €20,000 cost of its removal, the Hanover Region, which was in charge of what to do with the stone, initially decided to leave it where it was discovered. However, after reconsideration, the stone was removed intact in the spring of 2015 by a mobile crane and transported by a low loader to the Mühlenberg hill about a kilometre (0.62 mi) away for exhibition. Around 400 bystanders witnessed the excavation and transport. The removal costs totalled €15,000, with the expense borne by the Hanover Region. The new site is at a picnic area close to a bicycle path.

== Description ==
The glacial erratic stone's approximate measurements are 2.6 metres (8 ft 6 in) high by 3.2 metres (10 ft) wide, with a circumference of 10 metres (33 ft). Its weight was originally estimated to be 50 tonnes (110,000 lb), but was found to be 27.5 tonnes (61,000 lb) when it was weighed at the time of its removal from the field where it was found and excavated.

Geologists inspected the stone. It is probably composed of gneiss, estimated to be 1.4 to 1.6 billion years old. The mineral composition was preliminarily observed to be feldspar and biotite. It was brought to the region by a glacier from Scandinavia, probably from Sweden.

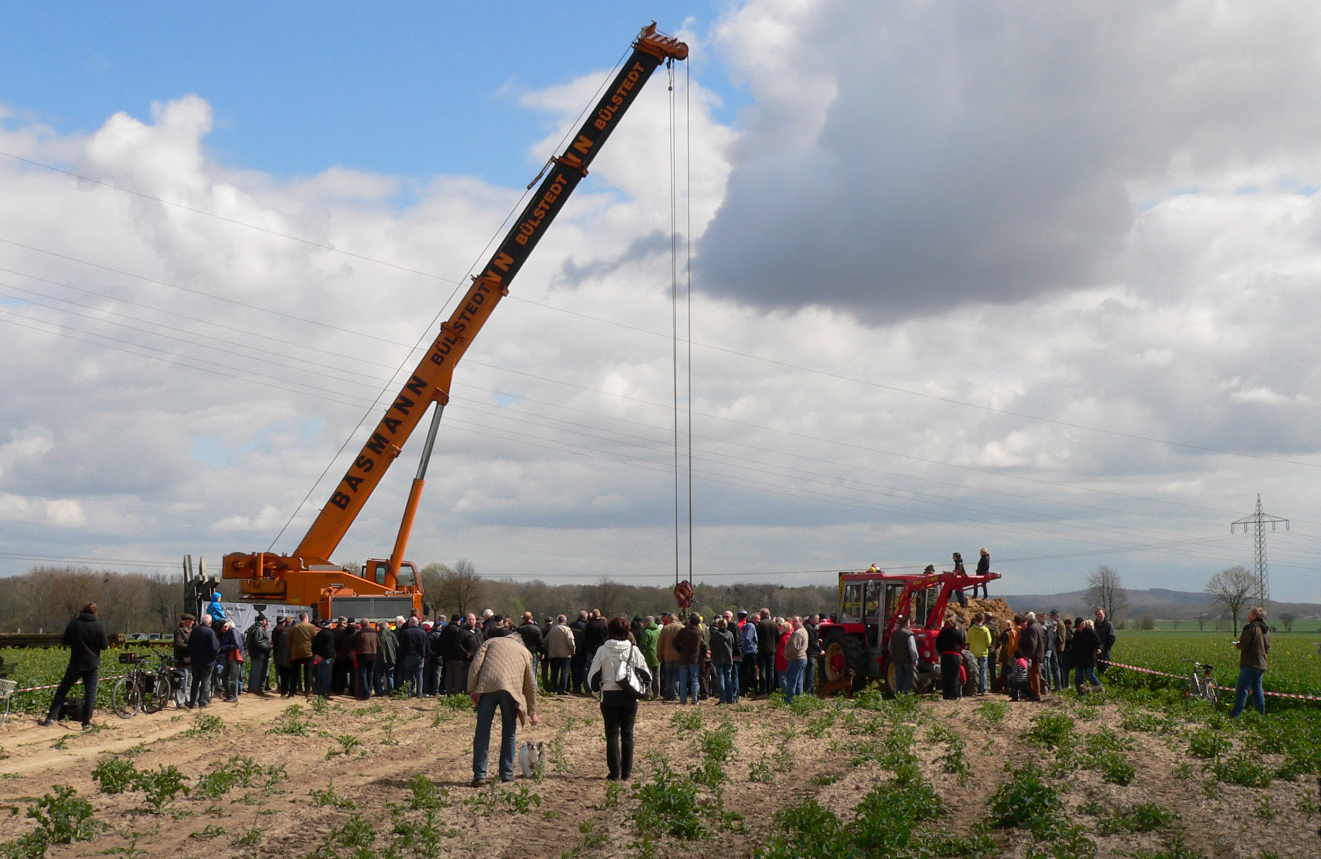
Bystanders during the removal with a crane

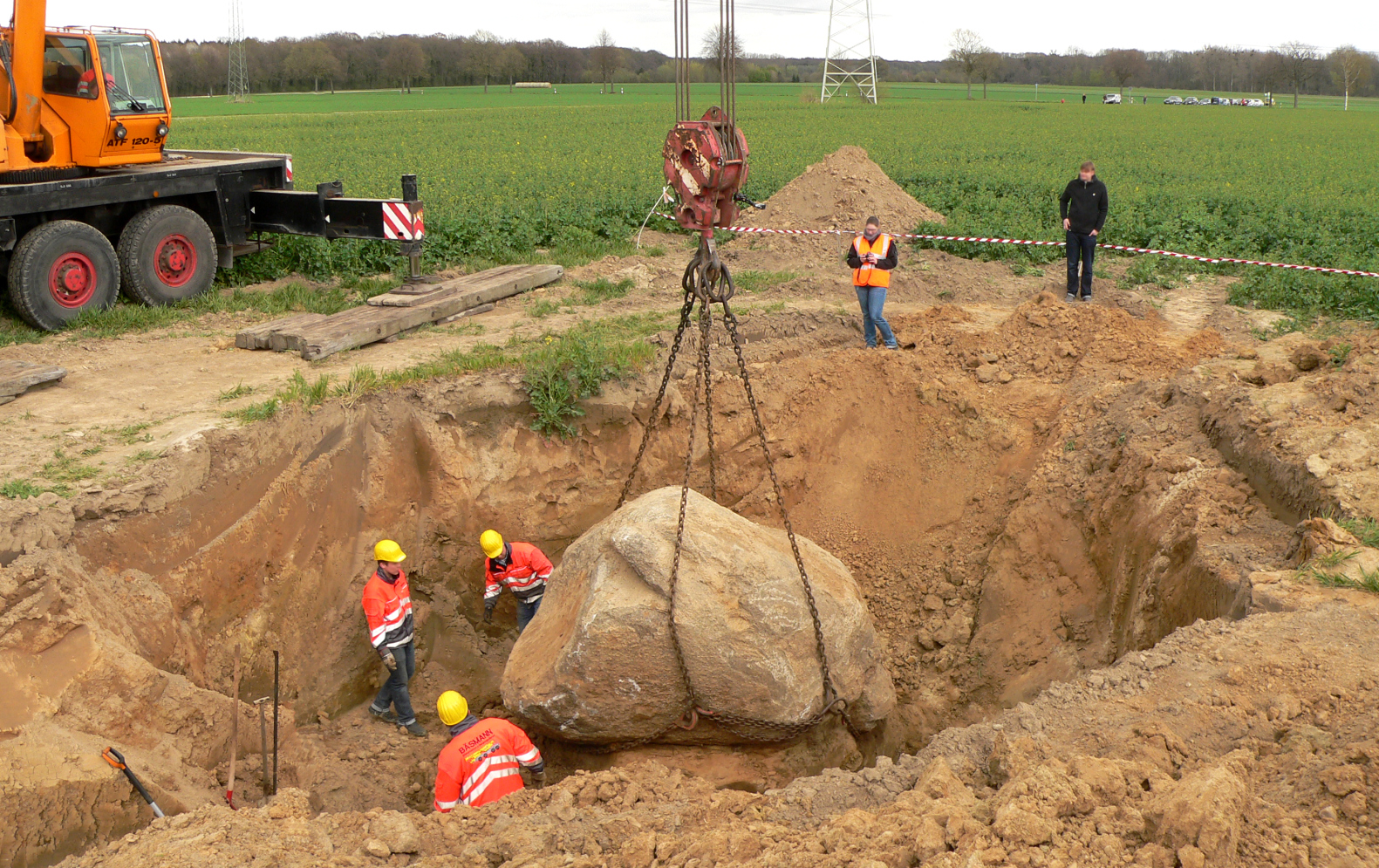
Lifting the glacial erratic

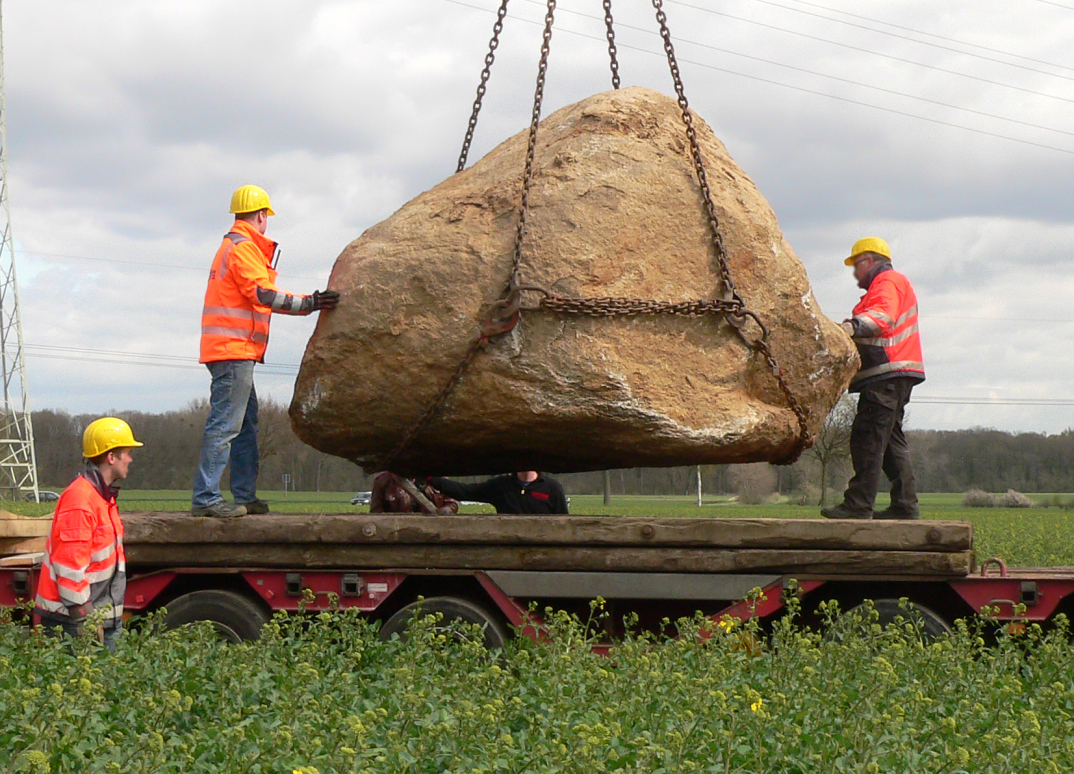
Placement on a low loader

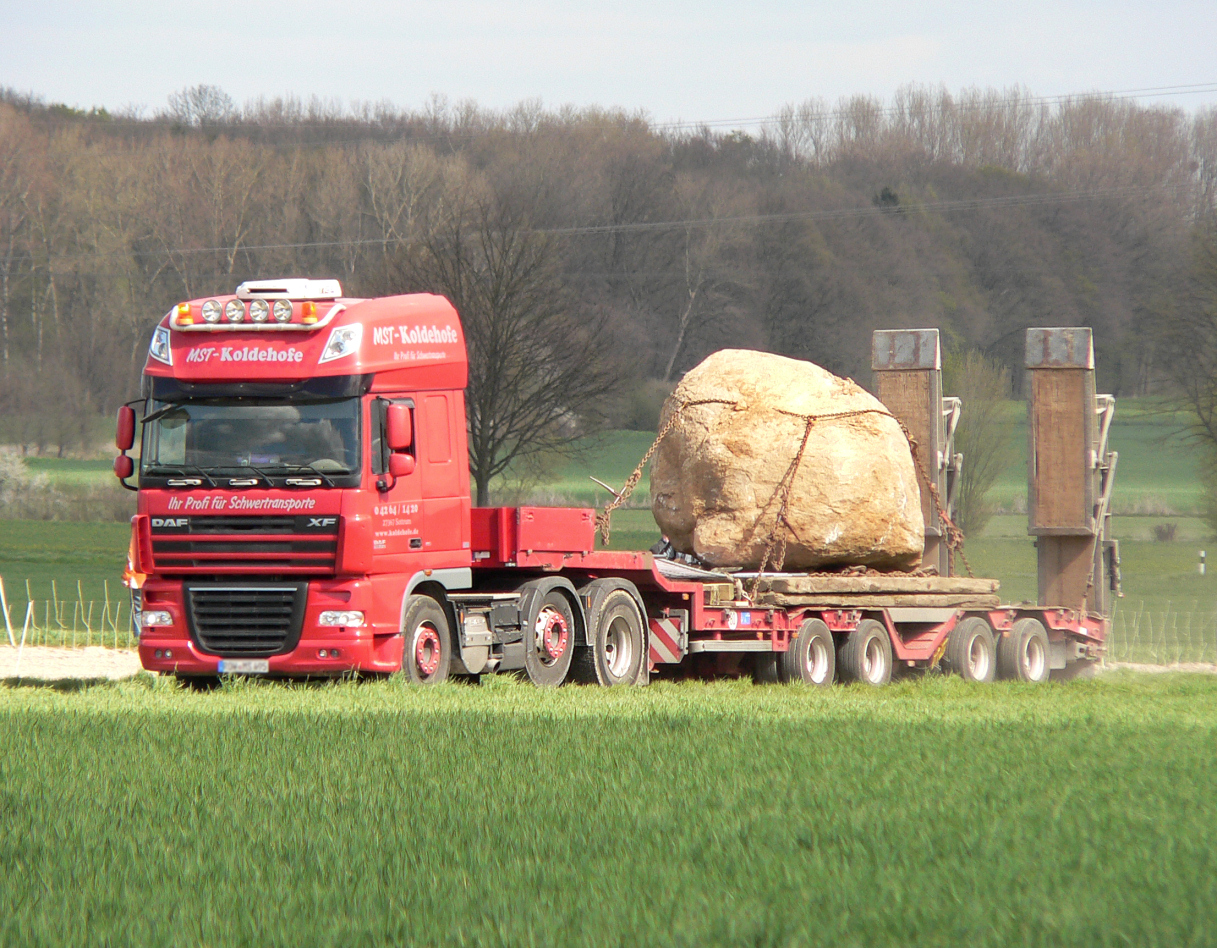
Transport to the final destination

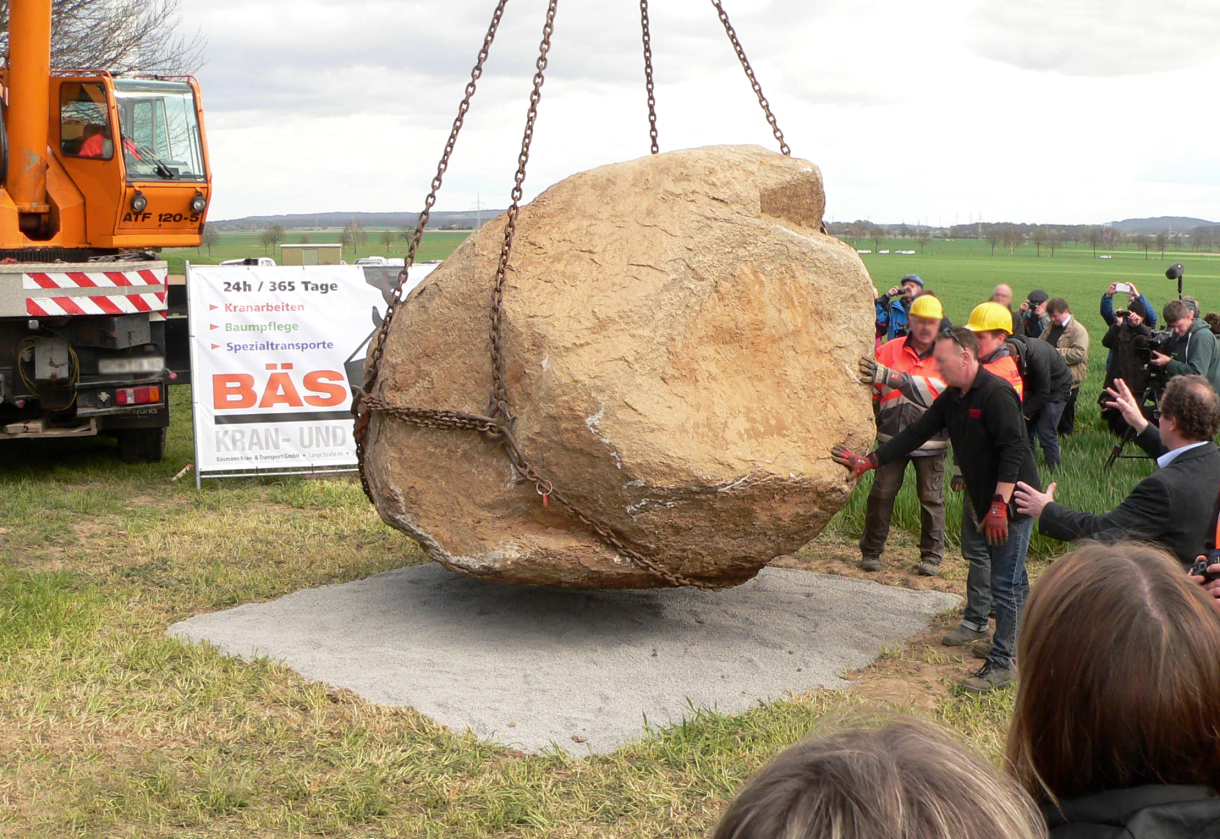
Being lowered into place at the new location

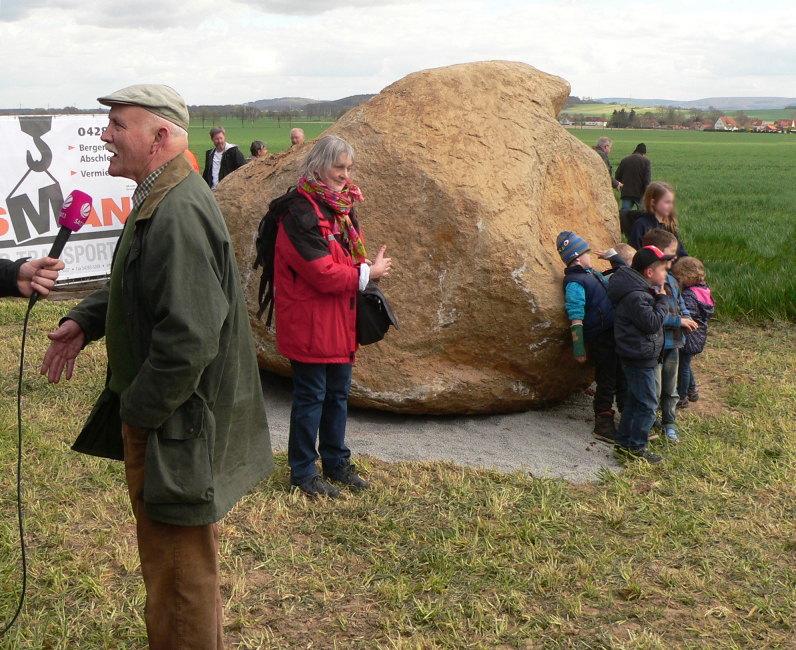
The farmer (left) who found the glacial erratic

== See also ==
- List of individual rocks
- Der Alte Schwede (in English)
- Giebichenstein (in English)
- Großer Stein von Altentreptow (in German)
