= Friedrich Lorenz =

German Catholic priest (1897–1944)

Friedrich Lorenz (10 June 1897 in Klein Freden – 13 November 1944 in Halle) was a Catholic priest and a member of the Missionary Oblates of Mary Immaculate.

== Life ==
Friedrich Lorenz was born as a postman's son in 1897 in Klein Freden in today's Hildesheim district in Lower Saxony. In 1902, the family moved to Hildesheim. Here Lorenz had his first contact with the Missionary Oblates of Mary Immaculate. He went to the St. Karl Oblate boarding school in Limburg in the Netherlands from 1911 to 1916. In connection with this, he joined the Novitiate of the Oblates at Maria Engelport Monastery, although one month later, the monastery had to let him go because he had been called into the army. In the First World War, he fought as a corporal and a non-commissioned officer on the Western Front. For his bravery, he was awarded the Iron Cross, second class.

After the war, he joined the monastery again, took his eternal vows on 25 July 1923, and a year later, was ordained a priest by the Bishop of Fulda, Joseph Damian Schmitt. Lorenz had his first posting in the People's Mission. Because he found it hard to deliver sermons, he was transferred to Schwerin.

On 1 September 1939, he had to return to the military as a chaplain as the Second World War was looming. Once again, he received the Iron Cross for his bravery. In 1940, he returned to Schwerin. Here he developed contacts with the "Wednesday Circle" ("Mittwochskreis"), a discussion group for men from the Stettin pastoral area. On 4 February 1943, the Wednesday Circle was stormed by the Gestapo resulting in 40 people being arrested, among them Friedrich Lorenz. Lorenz was sentenced by the Reichskriegsgericht in Torgau on 28 July 1944 to death for "listening to enemy broadcasts", "undermining the fighting forces", and "helping the enemy". The sentence was upheld in later proceedings from 2 to 4 September. On 13 November 1944 at 16:00, Father Friedrich Lorenz OMI was beheaded in Halle. His body was cremated. The burial of the urn took place on 3 November 1947 in the monastery graveyard in Hünfeld.
