= Freden =

- Municipality
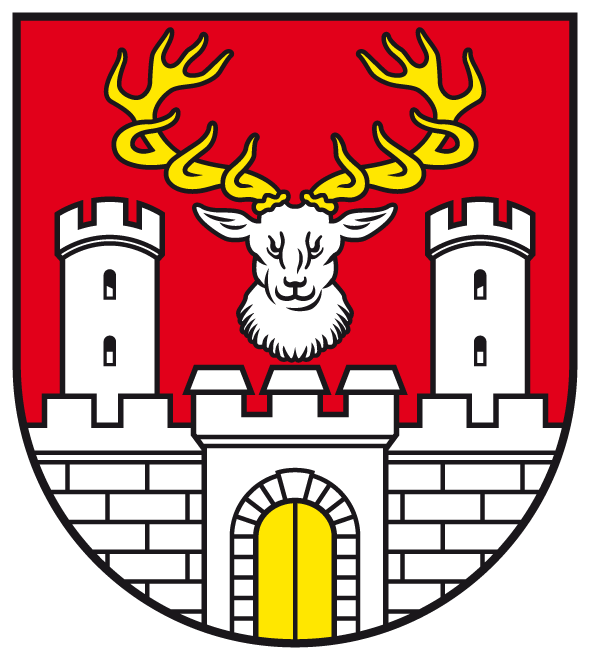
- Coat of arms

- Location of Freden within Hildesheim district
- Interactive map of Freden
- Location within Germany Location within Lower Saxony
- Coordinates: 51°56′N 09°54′E
- Country: Germany
- State: Lower Saxony
- District: Hildesheim

Government
  - Mayor (2021–26): Daniel Bernhardt (Ind.)

Area
  - Total: 53.49 km^{2} (20.65 sq mi)
- Elevation: 127 m (417 ft)

Population (2025-12-31)
  - Total: 4,477
  - Density: 83.70/km^{2} (216.8/sq mi)
- Time zone: UTC+01:00 (CET)
  - Summer (DST): UTC+02:00 (CEST)
- Postal codes: 31084
- Dialling codes: 05184
- Vehicle registration: HI
- Website: www.gemeindefreden.de

Freden (German pronunciation: [ˈfʁeːdn̩]) is a village and a municipality in the district of Hildesheim, in Lower Saxony, Germany. It is situated on the river Leine, approx. 25 km south of Hildesheim. Since 1 November 2016, the former municipalities Everode, Landwehr and Winzenburg are part of the municipality Freden.

Freden was the seat of the former Samtgemeinde ("collective municipality") Freden.

== Personalities ==
- Friedrich Lorenz (1897-1944), Catholic priest, Nazi opponent
- Friedrich Mennecke (1904-1947), NS doctor who participated in the mass destruction of the so-called euthanasia program of national socialism as an accomplice.
