= Everode =

- Ortsteil of Freden
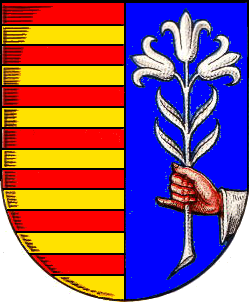
- Coat of arms
- Interactive map of Everode
- Location within Germany Location within Lower Saxony
- Coordinates: 51°57′N 09°54′E
- Country: Germany
- State: Lower Saxony
- District: Hildesheim
- Municipality: Freden

Area
  - Total: 6.1 km^{2} (2.4 sq mi)
- Elevation: 188 m (617 ft)

Population (2015-12-31)
  - Total: 463
  - Density: 76/km^{2} (200/sq mi)
- Time zone: UTC+01:00 (CET)
  - Summer (DST): UTC+02:00 (CEST)
- Postal codes: 31085
- Dialling codes: 05184
- Vehicle registration: HI
- Website: www.everode.de

Everode (German pronunciation: [eːfəˈʁoːdə]) is a village and a former municipality in the district of Hildesheim in Lower Saxony, Germany. Since 1 November 2016, it is part of the municipality Freden.

The town was first mentioned in the ownership deed of Bishop Bernward of Avenigeroth in the year 996. In July 1965, the town voluntarily joined a joint community (Leine) alongside Freden, Winzenburg, Eyershausen, Ohlenrode and Wetteborn. On the 1st of March 1974, Meimerhausen was also added.

On the 1st of November 2016, this joint community was dissolved and Everode became a part of the Freden (Leine) municipality.

The village hosts a yearly tomato festival. Festivities include tomato flavoured ice-cream and a fresh tomato market.
