= Wilma Landwehr =

German politician

- Born: Wilma Mahlstedt; 5 January 1913 (age 113); Walle, Bremen, Germany
- Died: Bremen, West Germany
- Occupations: activist politician
- Spouse: Heinrich Landwehr (1908-1974)
- Children: a daughter who died in infancy (ca 1939)

Wilma Landwehr (born Wilma Mahlstedt: 5 January 1913 – 8 August 1981) was a Bremen politician (KPD, SPD) and, between 1950 and 1971, member of the Bremen parliament ("Bürgerschaft").

== Life ==
Wilma Mahlstedt was born into a working-class family in the Walle quarter of Bremen, located between the right bank of the river and the city centre. She attended the Reform ("progressive") School in Schleswig Street and then spent a year at a Home Economics College, an institution designed to prepare students for careers as senior domestic servants. Wilma Mahlstedt preferred factory work, however (which increasingly was better paid than "domestic service" at this time), taking a job in a tobacco factory when she was 15. She continued in factory work till 1932, playing an active part in the trades union movement. She was also politically active more generally, having been a member of the Young Communists since her school days.

It was in the Young Communists that she got to know Heinrich Landwehr. They married in 1930 when she was seventeen, and in 1932 moved together to Breslau (as Wrocław was then known). Heinrich Landwehr was a paid official of the Young Communists and had been relocated in connection with his work. However, in 1933 the Nazis took power and lost no time in transforming Germany into a one-party dictatorship. Following the Reichstag fire at the end of February 1933 communists, such as Heinrich Landwehr, found themselves subjected to particularly intensive persecution. It was presumably around this time that Wilma Landwehr also joined the (now illegal) Communist Party of Germany. In December 1933 Heinrich Landwehr, in response to party instructions, relocated from Silesia via Czechoslovakia to Moscow, accompanied by his wife. Between 1933 and 1939 Wilma lived in the Soviet Union under an assumed identity as "Dolly Wehner". She worked, between 1934 and 1936, as an intern in Moscow with the European secretariat of the Young Communist International organisation. During much of this time her husband, sent back to undertake "illegal party work", lived underground in the industrial Ruhr area of Germany, but in the summer of 1936 he returned to Moscow.

The next year the couple fell foul of the dictator's belief - not necessarily unfounded - that some comrades thought that someone other than him, such as, for instance, Leon Trotsky, should be running the Soviet Union. Unlike many arrested political exiles from Nazi Germany, Heinrich and Wilma Landwehr were not killed, but in the context of the purges of 1936-38 they were sent into internal exile in 1937, ending up in or near Rostov-on-Don where Wilma Landwehr was sent to work in a tobacco factory. Following the remarkable news in October 1939 that a non-aggression pact had been concluded between Germany and the Soviet Union, Heinrich Landwehr, who at this point was serving as a forced labourer on an agricultural unit, was handed over to the Gestapo back in Germany, and Wilma Landwehr successfully submitted an application to be returned to Germany. She arrived back in Bremen at the end of the summer, a week or so ahead of her husband. Her baby daughter died a few days later.

Back in Bremen Heinrich Landwehr was required to report regularly to the Gestapo. Little is known of how the Landwehrs came through the war. There is mention of Wilma Landwehr having been detained by the Gestapo, after which she worked as a precision mechanic ("Feinmechanikerin") and later in an office job with Atlas Elektronik in Bremen: here one of her tasks involved simultaneous translation, working with Russian prisoners of war being used as forced labourers.

War ended with German defeat in May 1945. The western two thirds of the country were divided into four occupation zones. The north-west of the country was placed under British military occupation, with the exception of Bremen which for strategic reasons was occupied by the United States Army. Political party membership was no longer outlawed, and both the Landwehrs now joined not the Communist Party but the Social Democrats. Wilma Landwehr immediately became very active within the party, undertaking a succession of party functions. She headed up the party's women's group in the city's Ostertor quarter and served as a member of the regional party executive for Bremen. After the death of Anna Stiegler in 1963 Wilma Landwehr took over the chair of the SPD Women's Working Group for the party for the entire Bremen region.

Meanwhile, she supported herself, from 1949, with a public service job. It was in May 1949 that three of the four military occupation zones into which Germany had been divided four years earlier, including the British and US zones, were fused together and relaunched as the German Federal Republic (West Germany). By that time Landwehr had already stood, in 1946/47, as an SPD candidate for election to the member of the Bremen parliament ("Bürgerschaft"). She was not successful. On 15 September 1950 she took the seat vacated through the resignation of Karl Köster. She was re-elected on her own account in the election of 7 October 1951, and then again in 1955, 1959, 1963 and 1967, becoming one of the assembly's most high-profile members.

Landwehr became known as a passionate and tireless campaigner for training and education, fighting for the retention of the compulsory six year junior school system introduced in 1949. That was a battle that was lost in 1955, however, when, following a political deal between the local SPD and coalition partners in the Bremen parliament, Bremen came into line with the rest of the country and switched to four year junior schools. Nevertheless, during the 1960s she became her party's education spokesperson in the chamber.

As a politician she was known for speaking her mind in a direct manner, generally sticking to facts. One exception was her reaction to speeches from Communist Party members in the "Bürgerschaft" during the 1950s. One contemporary recalled how she would become a true "Kommunistenfresserin" (loosely: "Communist muncher") on these occasions. Like a number of Social Democrats who had cut their political teeth as Communist Party members and then been bitterly disappointed by the actions of (former) political comrades, her anti-Communism passion was backed by the conviction of a true convert.

At the end of the 1960s Landwehr was part of the committee of enquiry into the building land affair which involved payments believed to be questionable to a land agent who was described as a friend to the SPD leader in Bremen, Richard Boljahn. The affair ended Boljahn's political career. Another parliamentary committee in which she served was that which drafted Bremen's Higher Education Law, which in turn led to the founding in 1971 of the University of Bremen.

Wilma Landwehr did not stand for re-election in 1971. Heinrich Landwehr had retired the previous year from his longstanding job as secretary of the party regional organisation. He was terminally ill and she cared for him, with a level of self-sacrifice that drew comment from at least one commentator, till his death in 1974.

Four and a half years younger than her husband, Wilma Landwehr outlived him by seven years, dying of heart disease five months short of her own sixty-ninth birthday.
