= Der Alte Schwede =

- Glacial erratic
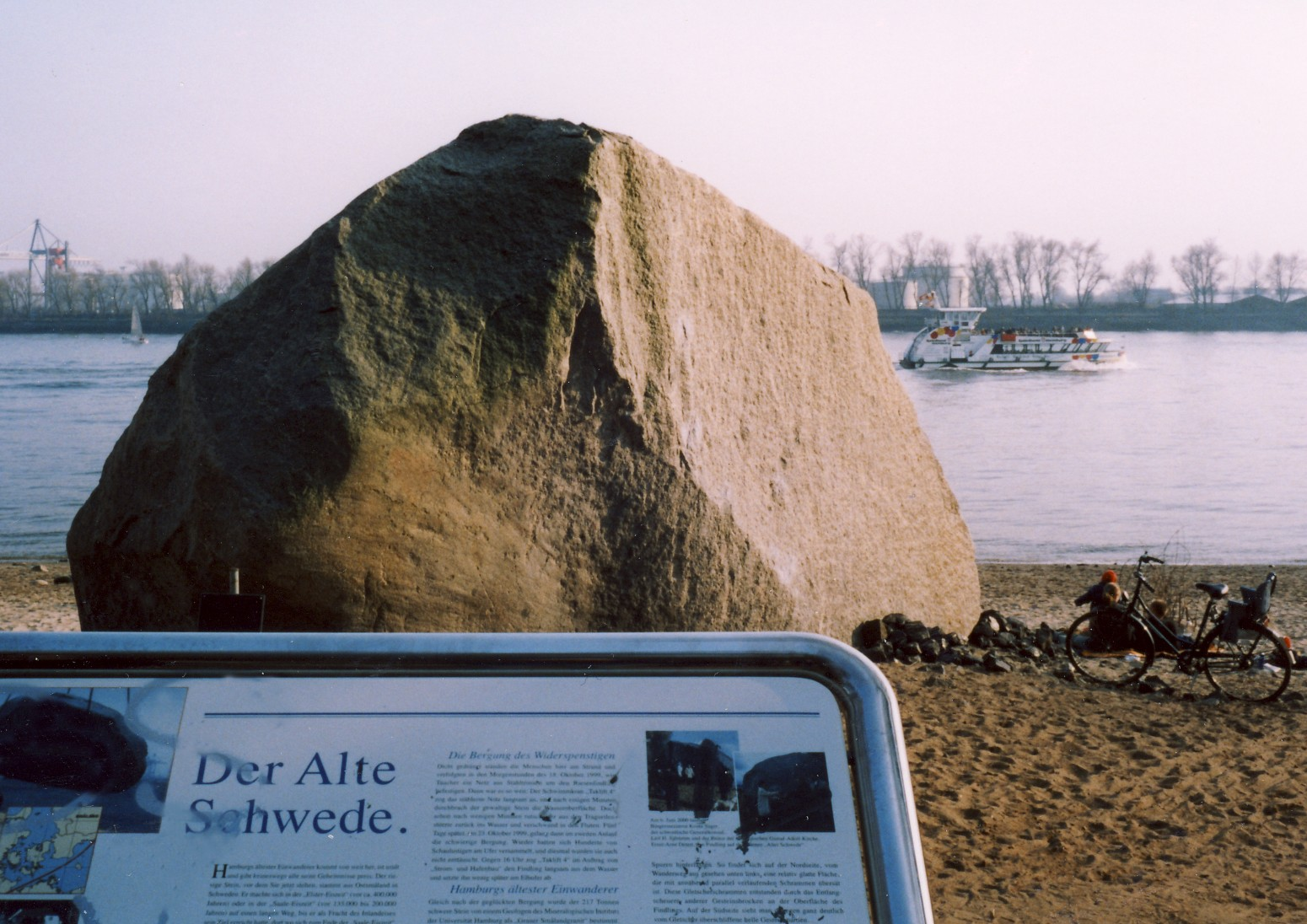
- "Der Alte Schwede", 2003

- Coordinates: 53.5446°N 9.8956°E
- Location: near Hamburg
- Geology: glacial erratic

Der Alte Schwede or Alter Schwede (meaning (The) Old Swede in German) is a glacial erratic in Germany.

== Features ==
The rock has a circumference of 19.7 m, a height of 4.5 m and weighs 217 tons. During the Elster maximum glaciation of the ice age 400 000 years ago, it was carried from Småland to the site where it was found. It was found during dredging of the river Elbe near Hamburg in 1999, at a depth of 15 m. In June 2000, it was given its current name. It is Germany's oldest glacial erratic.
