= Alexander-von-Humboldt-Gymnasium, Neuss =

Coordinates: 51°10′56.14″N 6°41′20.86″E

Alexander-von-Humboldt-Gymnasium

Location
- Bergheimer Straße 233; 41464 Neuss; Rhein-Kreis Neuss; North Rhine-Westphalia; Germany

Information
- School type: Public Gymnasium
- Founded: 1966
- Head of school: Gerhard Kath
- Grades: 5–13
- Website: www.avhgneuss.de

The Alexander-von-Humboldt-Gymnasium (English: Alexander von Humboldt Gymnasium) is a Gymnasium in Neuss, North Rhine-Westphalia, Germany.

The eponym is Alexander von Humboldt (1769–1859). The school has approximately 100 teachers and 950 students.
