= Gordian Landwehr =

German Dominican friar (1912-1998)

Father Gordian Landwehr (born Hermann Landwehr: 30 December 1912 – 11 June 1998) was a German Dominican friar and, for over a decade, the Prior of the St. Albert Dominican Monastery in Leipzig. According to at least one source he was the most high-profile Roman Catholic priest in the German Democratic Republic.

== Biography ==
=== Provenance and early years ===
Gorgian Landwehr was born fourth of the twelve children of Heinrich and Anna Landwehr. Heinrich Landwehr was a businessman-trader in Lohne, a small industrial town between Bremen and Osnabrück in the north-west of Germany. The family were deeply religious. Two of his brothers also became priests and one of his sisters became a nun. When he was 13 he switched from the local middle school to the residential St. Joseph's Dominican Mission school (as the St.Thomas College was known at that time) at nearby Vechta (Oldenburg). He graduated from the school in 1932.

=== The Dominicans ===
That same year, on 12 May, he joined the Dominican community at Warburg (Westphalia) where he studied Theology and, in May 1936, made his religious vows. He was ordained into the priesthood by Auxiliary Bishop Joseph Hammels on 27 July 1938. Having concluded his studies he was transferred, in 1939, to the Dominican Monastery at Düsseldorf. However, war broke out in September 1939 and on 1 November 1940 Landwehr was conscripted for military service. Between 1941 and the end of the war he served with the army as a medical orderly on the Russian Front, which he was able to combine, unofficially, with extensive pastoral work. He became aware very early on of war crimes committed in the Soviet Union by German soldiers. In his autobiography, which appeared in 1995, he wrote of the mass murder of Jews, because of which his medical unit had not handed Jewish servicemen over to Nazi paramilitary (SS) units accompanying the army. But he would nevertheless bitterly reproach himself that he did not have the courage to protect more people from National Socialist savagery. He took the opportunity to learn Russian. In Minsk, where he was stationed for some time, and the surrounding area, where Catholicism remained (discreetly) the religion of a significant minority, he frequently celebrated Mass with congregations that included both local worshippers and off-duty German soldiers: this was strictly forbidden by the German military.

By the end of 1944 the German army was being relentlessly pursued back towards Germany by then Soviet army. Early in 1945 Gordian fled with other German soldiers and civilians from Gdingen to Denmark where, by the time the war ended, he had become a prisoner of war. In the Autumn/Fall of 1945 he was moved to a British prisoner of war camp by Lütjenburg, near the coast north of Hamburg. In May 1946, after approximately a year of captivity, he was able to return to his monastery at Düsseldorf where he quickly built a name for himself as a particularly effective priest.

=== German Democratic Republic ===
At the start of 1951 he received a request from Father Dr. Wunibald Brachthäuser, who at that time was the Dominican Provincial Superior for the "Teutonia (German) Province", that he should relocate to Leipzig in order to take on a broader pastoral and missionary role. In 1949 the four military occupation zones into which the western two thirds of Germany had been divided in 1945 were relaunched as respectively the German Federal Republic (West Germany) and the German Democratic Republic (East Germany). In 1951 moving from west to east still involved a move in the opposite direction to that of the main current of migration across Germany. Landwehr accepted the request and during the first half of 1951 he made the journey from the west to Leipzig, traveling via Berlin. Leipzig was (and remains) traditionally a Protestant city, but with a substantial Roman Catholic minority.

In summer 1951 work began on the construction of what became the St. Albert parish church in Leipzig-Wahren. It was the first new church to be built after the war in Saxony. A foundation stone was placed in October 1951 and just over a year later, on 15 November 1952, the church was consecrated by the Bishop of Meißen, Heinrich Wienken. At the same time the bishop elevated the existing Roman Catholic pastoral ministry to the status of a full parish, under the sponsorship of the Dominican Order. Gordian Landwehr became one of three priests responsible for the parish of Leipzig-Wahren.

At a meeting of the priests of the Leipzig Catholic community ("...von Priestern im Leipziger Oratorium") it was agreed that a monthly sermon directly expressly at young people should be delivered in the Leipzig deaconate. Father Gordian Landwehr was allocated the first of these. The reaction of listeners to that first sermon was so positive that the next time the priests met together the priest from "Leipzig South" proposed that Landwehr should take on the entire series of "youth sermons". The meeting agreed. Landwehr's reputation as a preacher grew rapidly. His regular "youth sermons" at the university church became a popular institution. Landwehr had always seen his move to East Germany as something of a missionary project. He now began to travel extensively across the south of the country as a missionary-preacher, addressing congregations and listeners at Dresden, Berlin, Chemnitz, Görlitz, Zwickau and a number of smaller towns. Young people seeking guidance remained a particularly important audience. There is an estimate that by the mid-1950s, beyond Leipzig, he was preaching in fifty towns and cities, and was reaching nearly 20,000 older teenagers and young adults a month with his sermons.

The approach of the East German ruling party to organised religion was not as relentless as that of sister parties in some of the other Soviet Bloc socialist states. Nevertheless, the ruling parties could not be expected to welcome signs that a church organisation might be presenting itself as an alternative source of ideas or influence. Father Gordian Landwehr's popularity as a preacher did not go unchallenged in the media. An article appeared in the Sächsische Zeitung describing Landwehr as a "NATO preacher in the robes of a Jesuit" ("Natoprediger im Jesuitengewand"). After such an unsubtle rebuke, leaders of the Dominican Order in West Germany expected that Landwehr would be arrested at any moment and requested his return to the Federal Republic. He himself was certain that the East German authorities would have welcomed such an outcome. But with the backing of the recently appointed Bishop of Berlin, Julius Döpfner, Gordian Landwehr chose to stay where he was, to the east of the internal frontier between the two versions of Germany. He ignored the preaching ban to which he was subjected and refused to be intimidated. From the perspective of one Christian commentator, "He continued to bear witness to the living God before the young people who were faced with a system that poured scorn and ridicule on a God that it tried to present as a fantasy figure". (Note: "Er konnte damit den jungen Menschen, die sich einem System gegenübersahen, das Gott als Hirngespinst verächtlich und lächerlich zu machen versuchte, weiter diesen lebendigen Gott verkündigen".) Supporters are convinced that, even though no other Catholic preacher was as openly critical of Communist ideology as he was, it was precisely on account of his popularity with his listeners that the party did not move more decisively against Landwehr. In his autobiography he himself later recalled an off-the-record remark from a party official in the late 1970s: "Father, here you have the freedom of the fool; you can say anything". (Note: "Pater, Sie haben hier Narrenfreiheit; Sie können alles sagen.")

=== Divided Germany ===
After 1990 Father Gordian was a recipient of the Order of Merit ("Großes Verdienstkreuz"). Minister-President Kurt Biedenkopf paid tribute:

- "A great achievement: to have given many tens of thousands of people courage at a time when there was much reason to despair. To have given tens of thousands of people the power to believe at a time when it was a risk openly to stand up [for Christian faith]. To have been there for tens of thousamds of people in this way, which of us can say that we did so much?"
- "Eine großartige Leistung: Vielen Zehntausenden von Menschen Mut gemacht zu haben in einer Zeit, in der aller Anlaß bestand mutlos zu werden. Zehntausenden von Menschen aus dem Glauben Kraft gegeben zu haben in einer Zeit, in der es schon ein Risiko bedeutete, sich offen zu bekennen. Für Zehntausende von Menschen in diesem Sinne da gewesen zu sein, wer kann das schon von sich sagen?"
  Kurt Biedenkopf

The future division of Germany was implicit in the creation of the four military occupation zones in 1945: it was made explicit with the launch of the US sponsored and Soviet sponsored "German Federal Republic" and "German Democratic Republic" in, respectively, May and October 1949. There was no sudden erection of barriers in 1949, however, and through the first part of the 1950s it remained possible for people to pass between West and East Germany. After 1952 the physical barriers became more impenetrable, but for most of the decade it remained possible to cross the border between the "two halves" of Berlin, although movement restrictions, chiefly from the eastern side, became progressively more obstructive. Neither his high public profile nor the candour of his preaching did anything to earn Landwehr any special travel privileges. Like (almost) all East German citizens, the unexpected appearance of the Berlin Wall during the week of 13 August 1961 meant that for many years he was unable to visit the west. It would be a source of enduring regret that he was not even allowed out in order to be with his mother while she died or for her burial. The authorities also prevented him from attending his brother's funeral in the west.

As vicar of the Dominican province covering an East German state that was becoming ever more effectively sealed off from the west Father Gordian became progressively more autonomous in taking on full responsibility for all Dominican activities in the German Democratic Republic. His activities as priest and overseer meant he was master of students and novice priest alike, as well as the order's point of contact for brother friars living and working - often "underground" - in the country's "fraternal neighbouring socialist states". There were extensive contacts with Dominicans in Poland, and a welcome in Leipzig for any of the small number of Dominican friars from Czechoslovakia who managed to make the trip across the border. (Friars in Czechoslovakia generally had to conceal their religious connections from the authorities and undertake full-time day jobs in the secular world.) Appropriate special powers ("...eigenen Vollmachten") were delegated to Father Gordian by the Master of the Order. To the extent that travel restrictions permitted, Father Gordian also encouraged the use of his Monastery as an international meeting point for Dominicans from both sides of the "Iron Curtain". (Travel restrictions for westerners wishing to cross to the east were never as severe as those imposed on most East Germans wishing to visit the west.)

=== Paulinerkirche ===
In or before 1964 it became known that the city authorities' plans to redevelop the entire university complex had been approved by Walter Ulbricht. The plans involved blowing up the university church which, miraculously, had survived the wartime air raids almost completely unscathed. Landwehr preached regularly at the church to his youth congregations, and he spoke out against the decision to destroy the church. The decision processes moved slowly, and it was only in January 1968 that the architectural competition for the redevelopment took place. The church was nevertheless dynamited on 30 May 1968. Landwehr's opposition to the destruction of the church was widely supported, and a number of students and concerned citizens ended up in prison following street protests against it: Gordian Landwehr again remained at liberty, however. The redevelopment for which the church had been destroyed finally got under way in 1973 and was completed in 1978. Meanwhile, the venue for father Gordian's sermons to the students and other young people was switched to the city's Protestant St. Nicholas Church, one of the largest churches in Saxony and in the public eye during the late 1989 as the focus of the Monday demonstrations that adumbrated East Germany's return to democracy.

=== Ecumenist ===
While welcoming the changes that led to political reunification in 1990, the changes to which Father Gordian became particularly committed during the 1970s were those involving Christian unity. His practical co-operation with pastors from the Protestant churches in Leipzig was a practical demonstration of this. He was always happy to accommodate and Protestant pastors who asked to join the St. Albert Monastery for spiritual retreats and ecumenical training sessions. After reunification he received the Order of Merit ("Großes Verdienstkreuz"), and was honoured with a laudatory address from the Minister-President of Saxony, Kurt Biedenkopf. In his brief reply Landwehr referenced the harmony between the church bells of the great Protestant parish church and those at his own catholic St. Albert Monastery: "There would be real harmony only if a centuries old yearning could finally be fulfilled: Christian unity in the world". (Note: "Was würde es erst für einen Zusammenklang geben, wenn eine Jahrhunderte alte Sehnsucht endlich in Erfüllung ginge: Die Einheit der Christen in der Welt.")

=== Later years ===
Father Gordian gave up his parish responsibilities in Leipzig-Wahren on health grounds in 1987, and in 1991 leadership of the St. Albert Monastery passed to a younger generation. After this partial retirement he nevertheless continued to preach at St. Albert and to other Catholic congregations in the city. Commentators assert that his longstanding fearless preaching, and his refusal to "keep out of politics" where the theme of a sermon incorporated political issues, made him an important prophet for the leaders and participants in the "Peaceful Revolution" of 1989/90.
