= Barsinghausen =

- Town
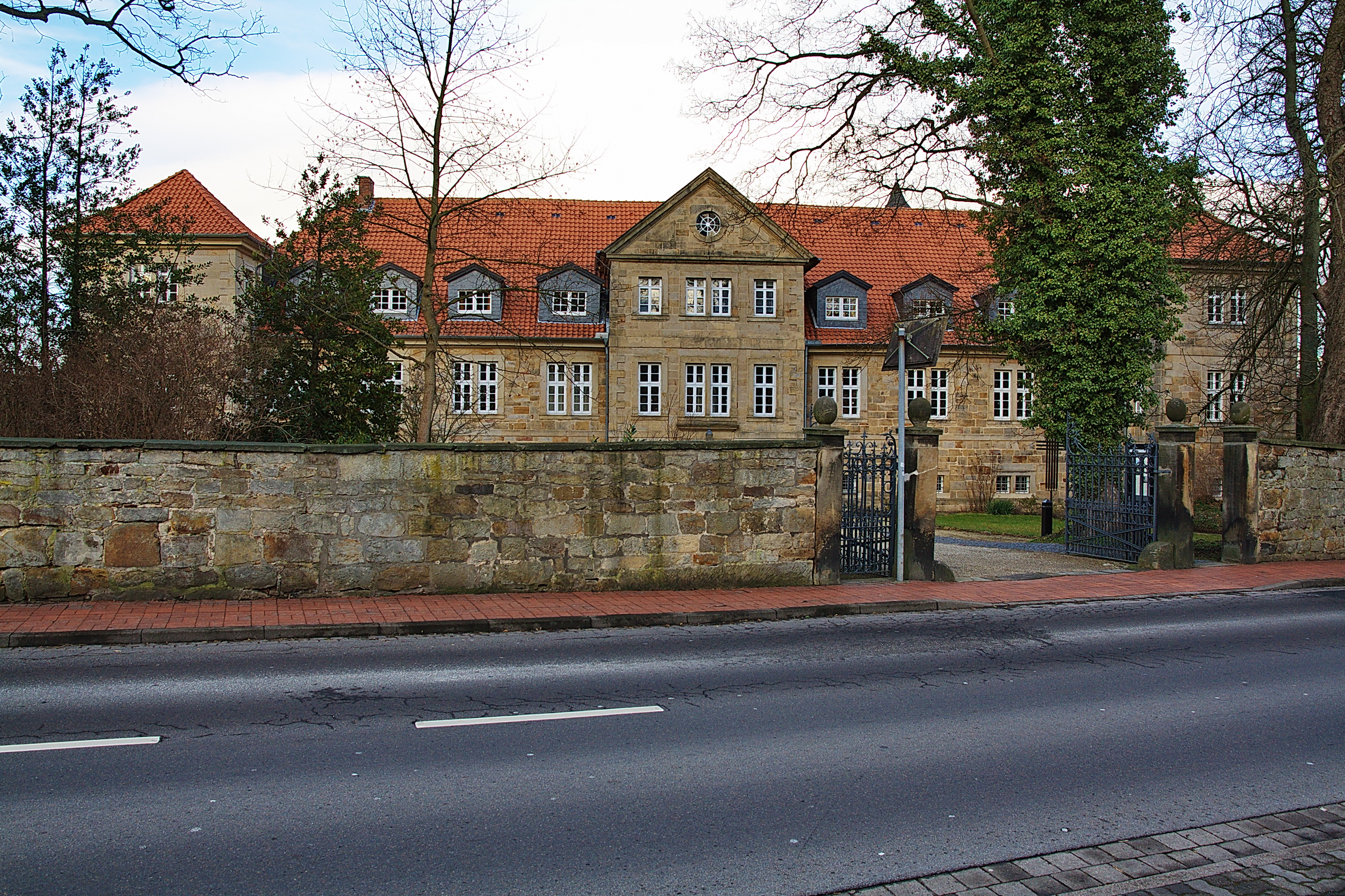
- Barsinghausen Monastery

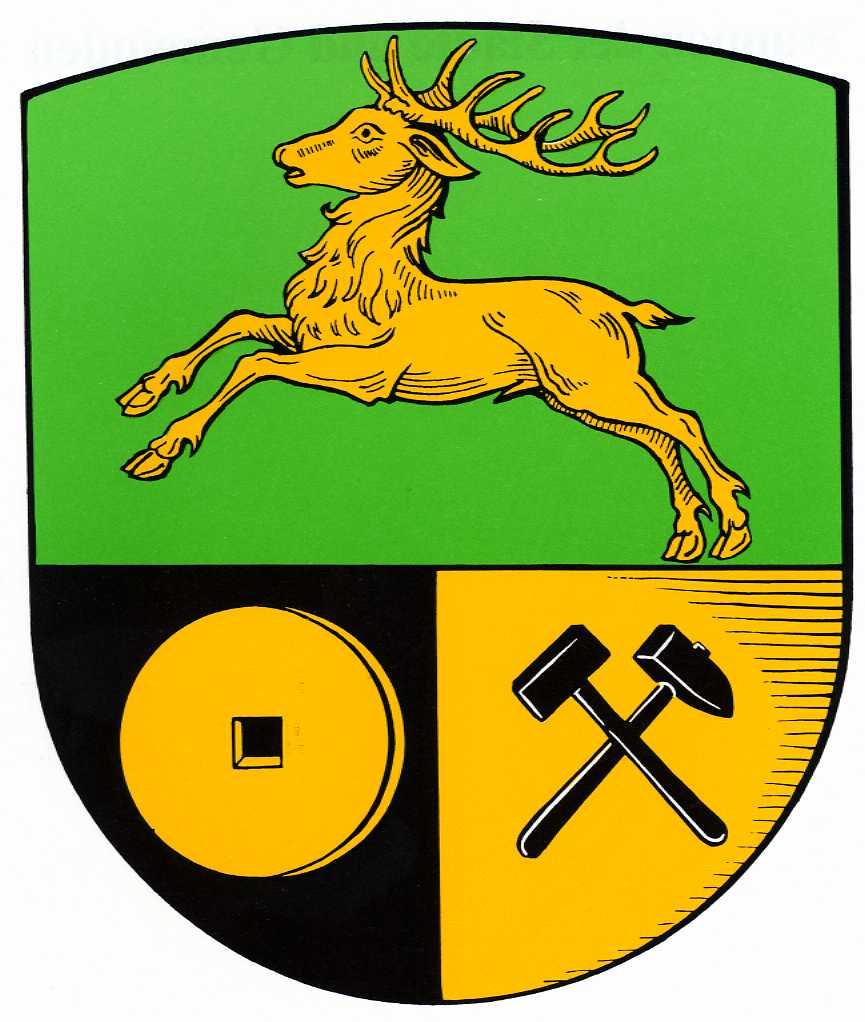
- Coat of arms

- Location of Barsinghausen within Hanover district
- Interactive map of Barsinghausen
- Location within Germany Location within Lower Saxony
- Coordinates: 52°18′0″N 9°28′52″E
- Country: Germany
- State: Lower Saxony
- District: Hanover
- Subdivisions: 18 district

Government
  - Mayor (2020–25): Henning Schünhof (SPD)

Area
  - Total: 102.81 km^{2} (39.70 sq mi)
- Elevation: 142 m (466 ft)

Population (2025-12-31)
  - Total: 33,833
  - Density: 329.08/km^{2} (852.32/sq mi)
- Time zone: UTC+01:00 (CET)
  - Summer (DST): UTC+02:00 (CEST)
- Postal codes: 30890
- Dialling codes: 05105
- Vehicle registration: H
- Website: www.barsinghausen.de

Barsinghausen (German pronunciation: [ˌbaʁzɪŋˈhaʊzn̩]) is a town in the district of Hanover, in Lower Saxony, Germany. It is situated at the Deister chain of hills approx. 20 km west of Hanover. Barsinghausen belongs to the historic landscape Calenberg Land and was first mentioned in 1193.

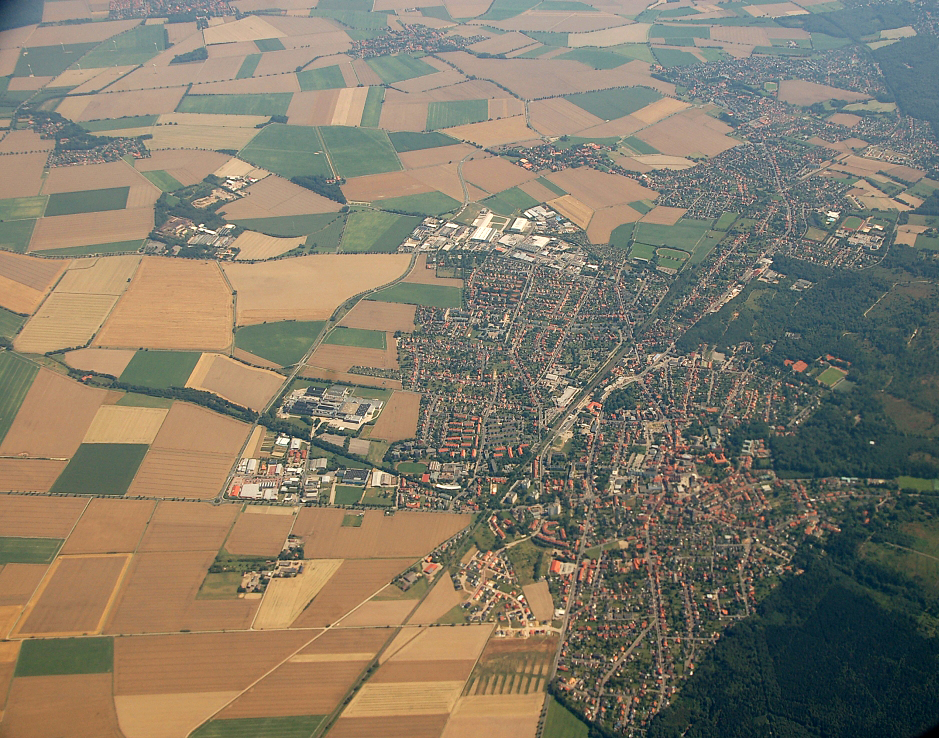
Aerial view of Barsinghausen

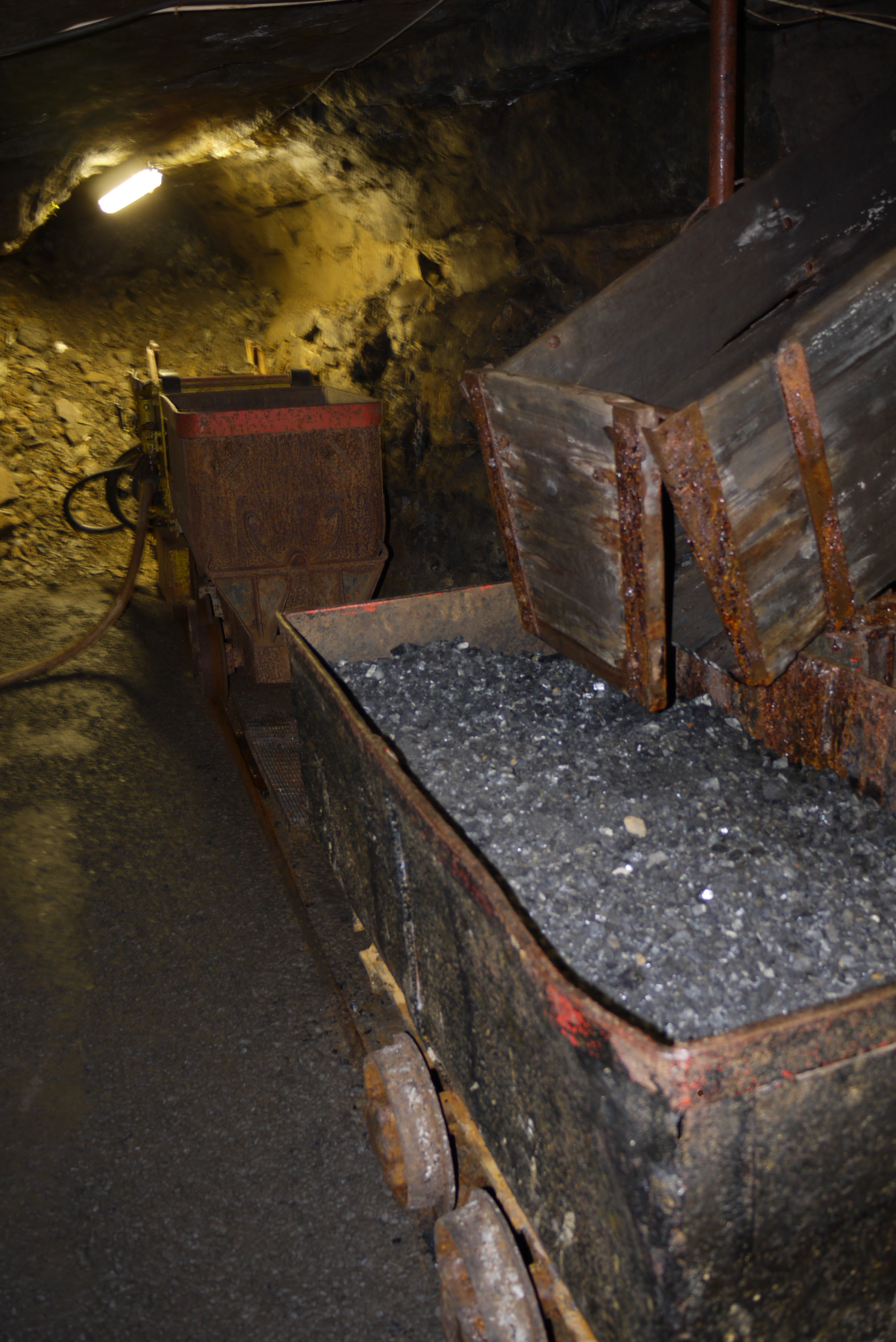
Exhibition mine “Klosterstollen” in Barsinghausen

== Geography ==
=== Neighbouring places ===
Barsinghausen adjoins Wunstorf, Seelze, Gehrden, Springe, Bad Nenndorf and Wennigsen.

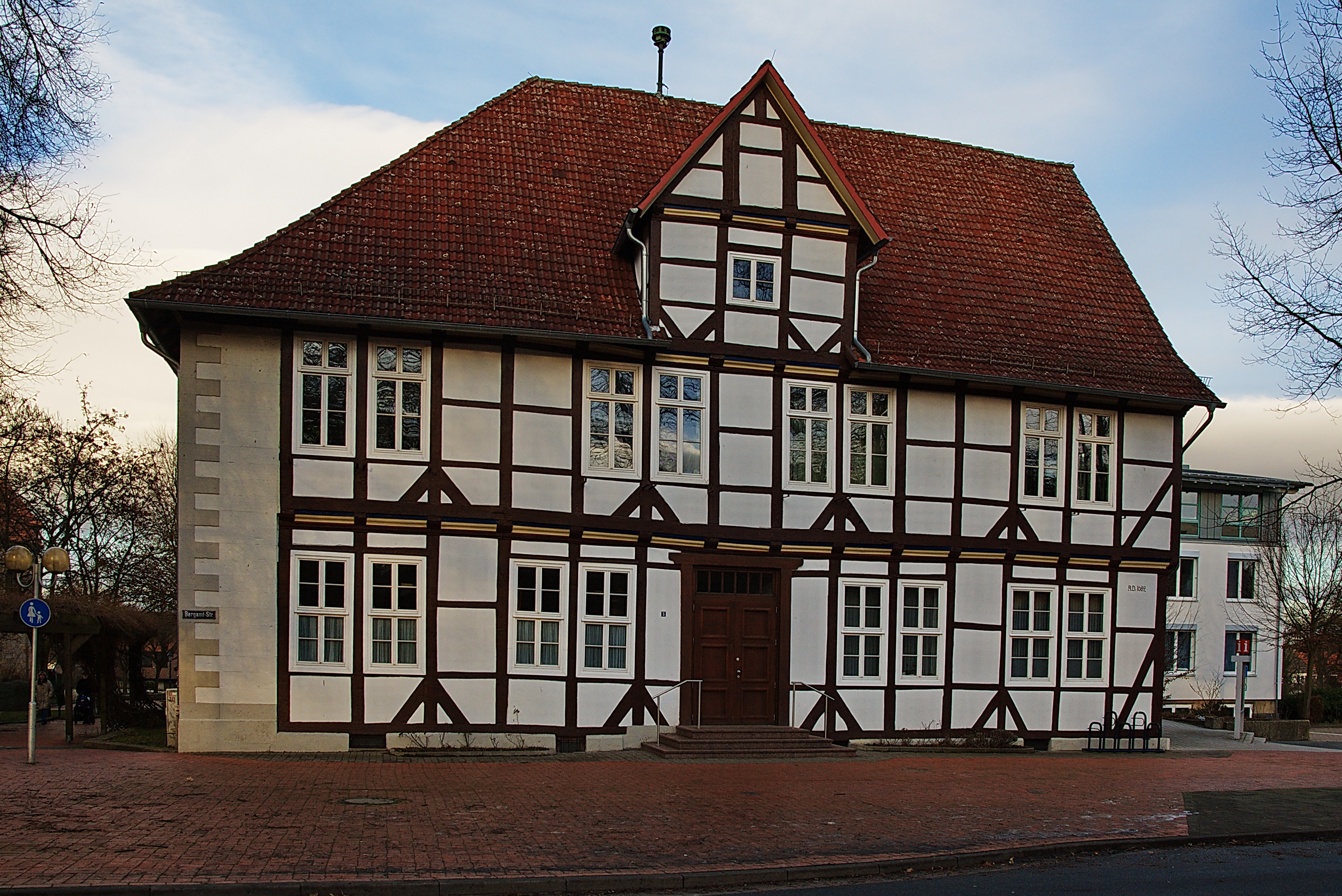
Town hall of Barsinghausen

=== Division of the town ===
Barsinghausen consists of 18 districts: Bantorf, Barrigsen, Barsinghausen, Eckerde, Egestorf, Göxe, Großgoltern, Nordgoltern, Groß Munzel, Hohenbostel, Holtensen, Kirchdorf, Landringhausen, Langreder, Ostermunzel, Stemmen, Wichtringhausen, Winninghausen

== History ==
Barsinghausen is the site of an old double monastery (“Kloster Barsinghausen”) that was established during the High Middle Ages. At that time, fertile loess soil and a number of influent streams to river Südaue constituted a central fundament for farming and numerous windmills in Calenberg Land. Barsinghausen became a coal mining town between 1871 and 1957. After World War II, other sectors of industry began to dominate Barsinghausen's economy.

=== Population development ===
(each time at 31 December)

- 1998 – 34,743
- 1999 – 34,648
- 2000 – 34,497
- 2001 – 34,408
- 2002 – 34,370
- 2003 – 34,376
- 2004 – 34,253

== Sights ==
Barsinghausen is home to "Kloster Barsinghausen", a nunnery first mentioned in 1193 (now a Lutheran women's convent, to Monastery Church St. Mary ("Marienkirche"), to the Deister Open Air Theater (“Deister Freilichtbühne”), to the exhibition mine “Klosterstollen”, to Sport Hotel Fuchsbachtal and to Lower Saxony's Soccer Association. The Colossus of Ostermunzel is a glacial erratic qualified as a natural monument. Its large size is abnormal, particularly for northern Germany and especially for Lower Saxony.

== Education ==
=== Elementary schools ===
- Adolf-Grimme-Schule
- Wilhelm-Stedler-Schule
- Ernst-Reuter-Schule
- Astrid-Lindgren-Schule
- Albert-Schweitzer-Schule
- Grundschule Groß Munzel
- Grundschule Hohenbostel
- Grundschule Bantorf

=== Secondary schools ===
- Hannah-Arendt-Gymnasium
- Lisa-Tetzner-Schule
- Goetheschule KGS Barsinghausen

=== Special schools ===
- Bert-Brecht-Schule (Special education school)
- VHS (Volkshochschule – Adult high school) Calenberger Land

== Twin towns – sister cities ==
Barsinghausen is twinned with:

- Brzeg Dolny, Poland
- Kovel, Ukraine
- Mont-Saint-Aignan, France
- Wurzen, Germany

== Notable people ==
- Hartmut Andryczuk, publisher
- Fritz Brase (1875–1940), military musician and composer
- Herbert Lattmann (born 1944), former member of the Bundestag (CDU)
- Kurt Sohns (1907–1990), painter, artist, professor at the Technical University of Hanover

=== Associated with the town ===
- Heinz Erhardt (1909–1979), actor and comedian, attended from 1919 to 1924 a boarding school in Barsinghausen
- Herbert Gruhl (1921–1993), politician and author (Ein Planet wird geplündert, 1975)
- Hans-Joachim Mack (1928–2008), General of the Bundeswehr
- Robert Schulz (1900–1974), SS brigade leader in Nazism, member of the Reichstag, lived and worked after 1945 as a civil servant in Barsinghausen
- Colonel Ernst Poten (1785–1838), prominent cavalry leader (1808–1815) in the King's German Legion in Portugal, Spain, France and at Waterloo and later in the Hanoverian Army.
- August Heinrich Walter Münstermann (1931–2007), founder of Pelikan Company in Mexico. Writer and Journalist of Wochenblatt in the region of Schaumburg, Niedersachsen.
