= Südaue =

River in Germany

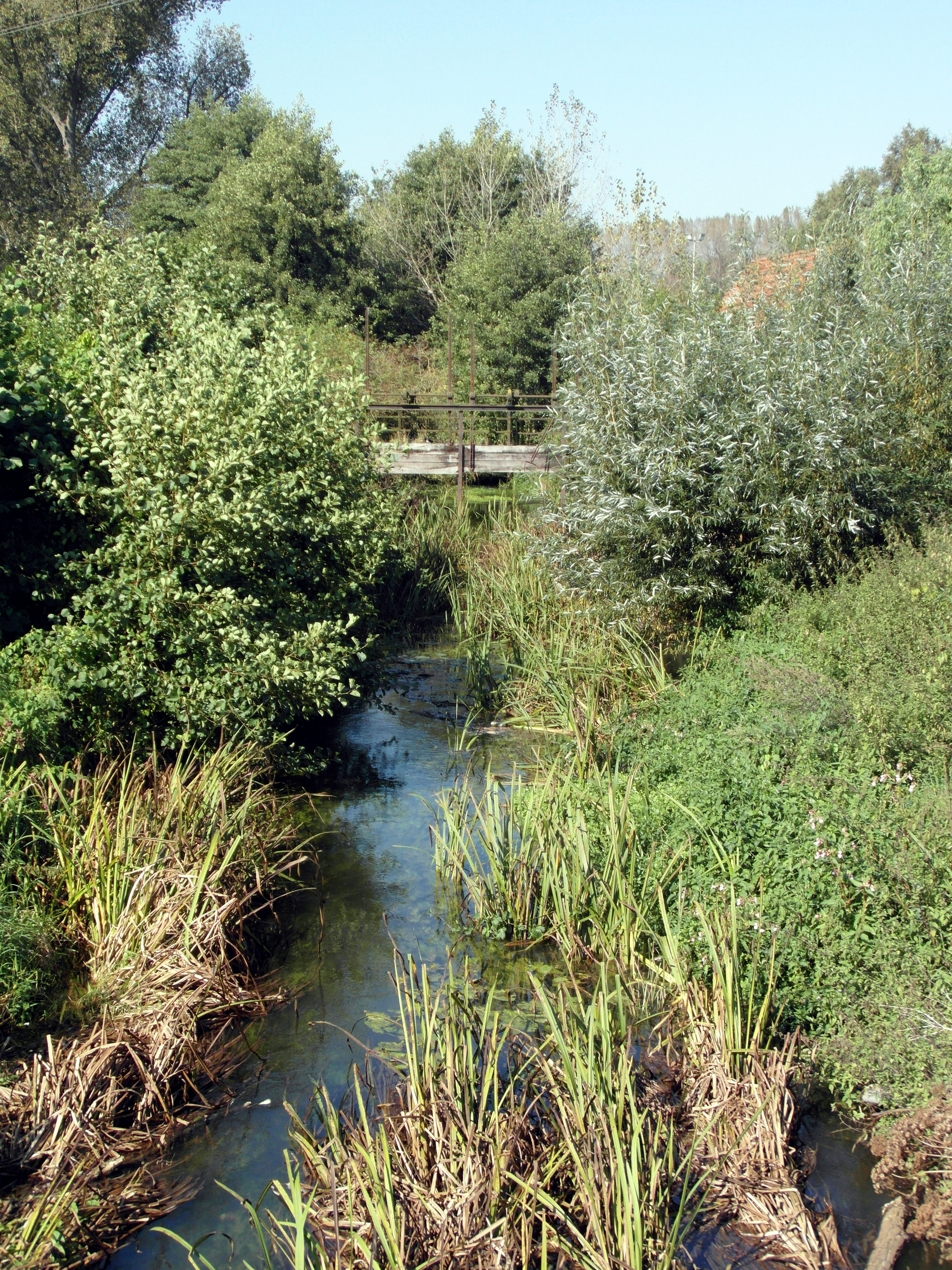
- The Südaue south of Groß Munzel (a district of Barsinghausen)

Location
- Country: Germany
- State: Lower Saxony

Physical characteristics
- Mouth
  - location: Westaue
  - coordinates: 52.4196°N 9.3991°E
- Length: 20.7 km (12.9 mi)

Basin features
- Progression: Westaue→ Leine→ Aller→ Weser→ North Sea

Südaue (in its upper course: Levester Bach) is a river of Lower Saxony, Germany. It flows into the Westaue west of Wunstorf.

== See also ==
- List of rivers of Lower Saxony
