= Landwehr, Lower Saxony =

Landwehr
- Ortsteil of Freden
- Coat of arms
- Interactive map of Landwehr
- Location within Germany Location within Lower Saxony
- Coordinates: 51°55′09″N 09°58′37″E
- Country: Germany
- State: Lower Saxony
- District: Hildesheim
- Municipality: Freden

Area
  - Total: 12.97 km^{2} (5.01 sq mi)
- Elevation: 198 m (650 ft)

Population (2015-12-31)
  - Total: 542
  - Density: 41.8/km^{2} (108/sq mi)
- Time zone: UTC+01:00 (CET)
  - Summer (DST): UTC+02:00 (CEST)
- Postal codes: 31087
- Dialling codes: 05184
- Vehicle registration: HI
- Website: eyershausen-landwehr.de

Landwehr (German pronunciation: [ˈlantˌveːɐ]) is a village and a former municipality in the district of Hildesheim in Lower Saxony, Germany. Since 1 November 2016, it is part of the municipality Freden.
