= Winzenburg =

- Ortsteil of Freden
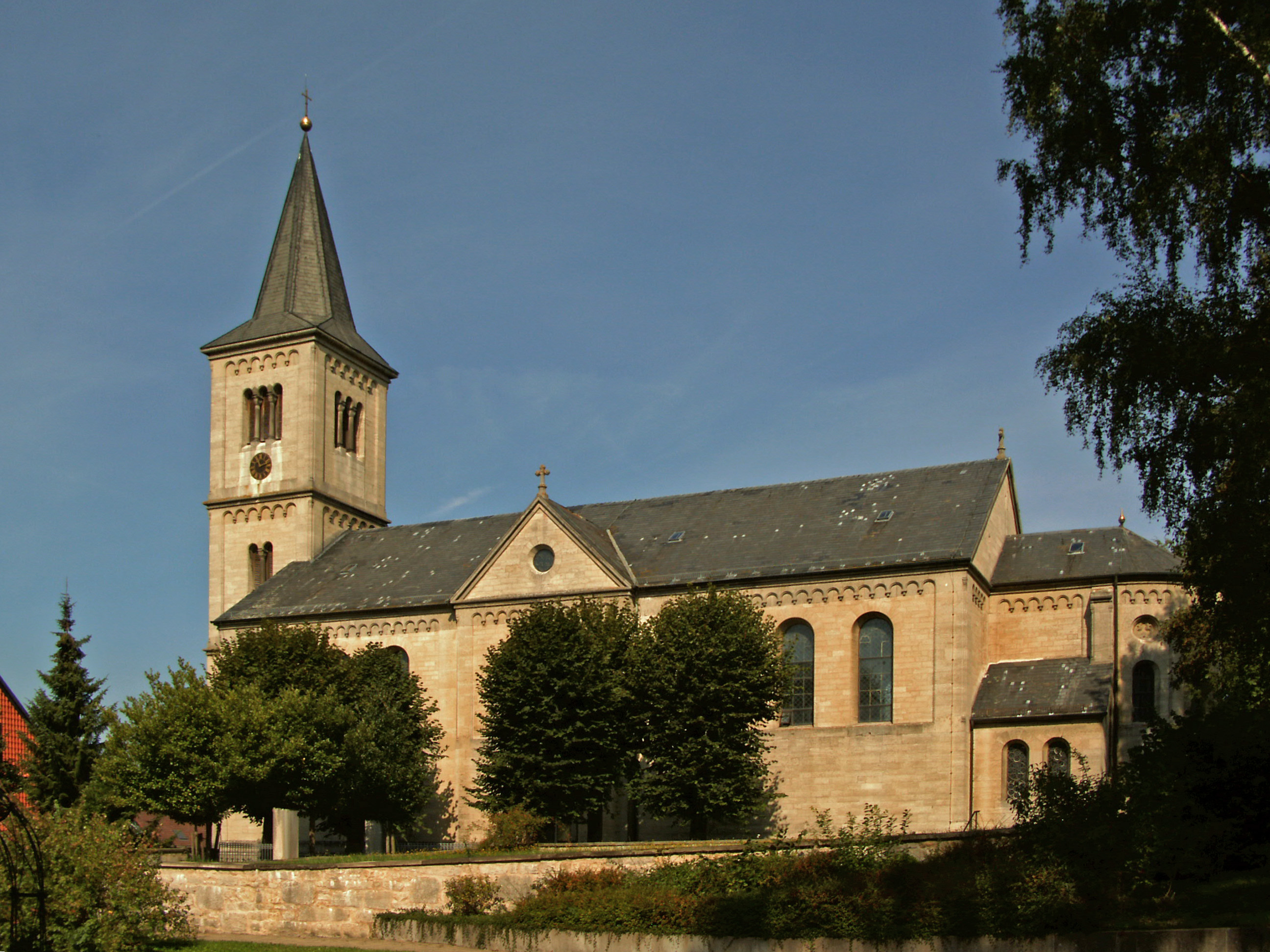
- Nativity of Virgin Mary Church

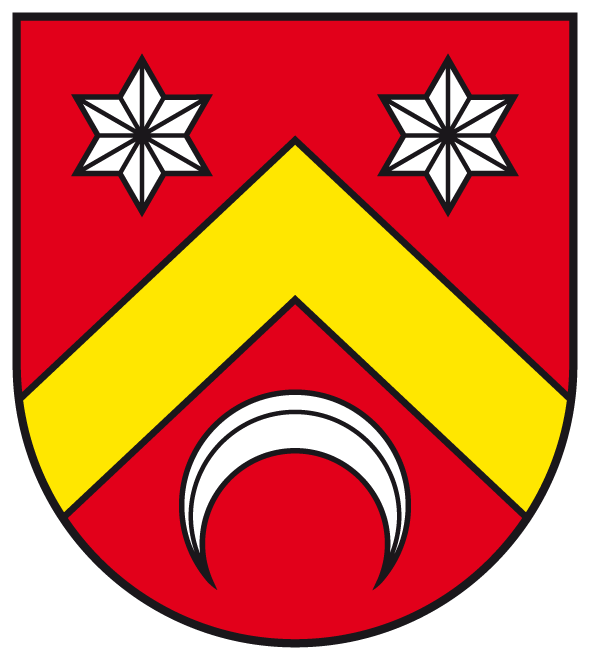
- Coat of arms
- Interactive map of Winzenburg
- Location within Germany Location within Lower Saxony
- Coordinates: 51°56′N 09°56′E
- Country: Germany
- State: Lower Saxony
- District: Hildesheim
- Municipality: Freden

Area
  - Total: 16.64 km^{2} (6.42 sq mi)
- Elevation: 178 m (584 ft)

Population (2015-12-31)
  - Total: 688
  - Density: 41.3/km^{2} (107/sq mi)
- Time zone: UTC+01:00 (CET)
  - Summer (DST): UTC+02:00 (CEST)
- Postal codes: 31088
- Dialling codes: 05184
- Vehicle registration: HI

Winzenburg (German pronunciation: [ˈvɪntsn̩ˌbʊʁk]) is a village and a former municipality in the district of Hildesheim in Lower Saxony, Germany. Since 1 November 2016, it is part of the municipality Freden. It comprises four smaller communities, including the village of Winzenburg, which dates from the Middle Ages. Winzenburg is located in the Leinebergland to the north of Bad Gandersheim, between the national parks of the Harz and the Weserbergland, in Lower Saxony, Germany. The municipality (German: Gemeinde) was formed on March 1, 1974 from the four previously independent communities of Winzenburg, Schildhorst, Westerberg and Klump. It is near the small town of Freden.

== Constituent villages ==
=== Winzenburg ===
Winzenburg is chiefly known for Winzenburg castle, a medieval castle now in ruins, which stands on a spur of the Sackwald. In the vicinity, it is also known for its man-made fishing ponds where one can either fish at one of the five ponds or eat fish at one of the Fischerhütte, the small nearby restaurants. Count Herman II of Winzenburg built the castle at Schöneberg.

=== Westerberg ===
The hamlet of Westerberg began as a settlement next to a glassblower founded in 1744. Originally temporary because the property was rented, rather than owned, after the third 8-year extension of the lease, the settlement became permanent. Area clay pits later supported the production of bricks. They are now filled with water and are managed by the Freden sport fishing club.

=== Klump ===
Klump is below the Sauberg and started out as small farms and farmers who rented the land they lived and worked on.

=== Schildhorst ===
The village is surrounded by forests, which are favored places to walk in summer and ski in winter. There is a bus connection to the railway station at Freden.

The village was of greater significance in the 18th and 19th centuries because of Glasfabrik Schildhorst, the glassblowing factory there, which produced white and other glass. The abundance of water, timber and minerals, natural resources required for the production of glass, made the site particularly suitable. In the 20th century, however, the industry left, and with it, the prosperity of Schildhorst. All that remains is a sawmill, a cheesemaker and a few traces of the glassblower. Today, the population is about 70.
