= Beberbach (Humme) =

River in Germany

Location
- Country: Germany
- States: North Rhine-Westphalia and Lower Saxony

Physical characteristics
- Source
  - location: East of Extertal
  - coordinates: 52.0847°N 9.1603°E
- Mouth
  - location: In Selxen, a district of Aerzen, into the Humme
  - coordinates: 52.0615°N 9.2821°E

Basin features
- Progression: Humme→ Weser→ North Sea

Beberbach is a river of North Rhine-Westphalia and Lower Saxony, Germany.

The Beberbach springs east of Extertal. It is a left tributary of the Humme in Selxen, a district of Aerzen.

== See also ==
- List of rivers of Lower Saxony
- List of rivers of North Rhine-Westphalia
