= Humme =

Humme may refer to:

- Hümme, a district of the town Hofgeismar in Hesse, Germany
- Humme (Weser), a river of North Rhine-Westphalia, Germany
