= Extertal =

- Municipality
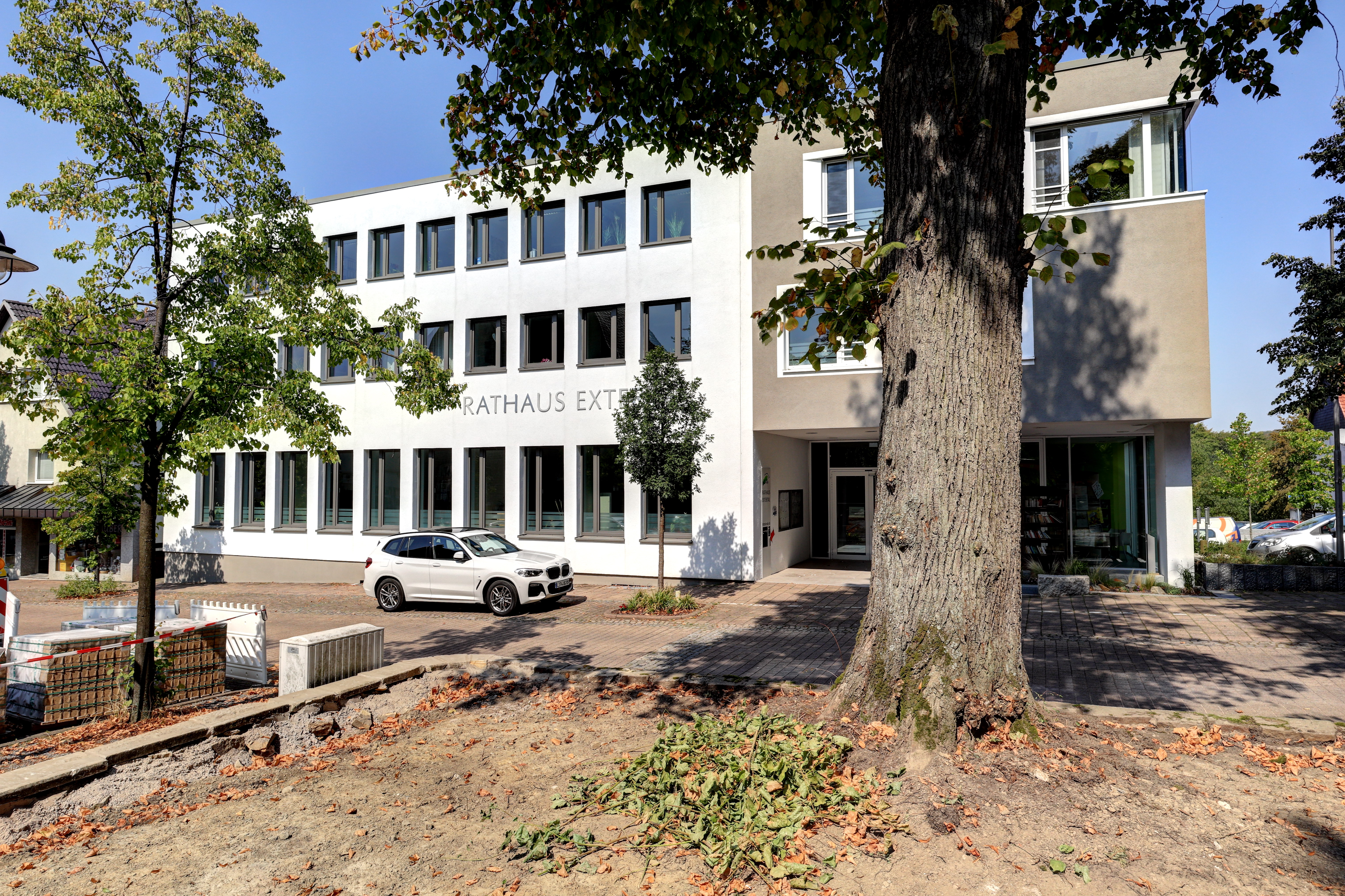
- Town hall

- Coat of arms

- Location of Extertal within Lippe district
- Interactive map of Extertal
- Location within Germany Location within North Rhine-Westphalia
- Coordinates: 52°04′00″N 09°07′00″E
- Country: Germany
- State: North Rhine-Westphalia
- Admin. region: Detmold
- District: Lippe
- Subdivisions: 12

Government
  - Mayor (2025–30): Christian Sauter (FDP)

Area
  - Total: 92.49 km^{2} (35.71 sq mi)
- Elevation: 240 m (790 ft)

Population (2025-12-31)
  - Total: 11,138
  - Density: 120.4/km^{2} (311.9/sq mi)
- Time zone: UTC+01:00 (CET)
  - Summer (DST): UTC+02:00 (CEST)
- Postal codes: 32699
- Dialling codes: 05262, 05751, 05754
- Vehicle registration: LIP
- Website: www.extertal.de

Extertal (German pronunciation: [ˈɛkstɐˌtaːl], lit. 'Exter Valley') is a municipality in the Lippe district of North Rhine-Westphalia, Germany, with c. 11,100 inhabitants (2025).

Extertal is located on the northern edge of the circle in the Teutoburg Nature Reserve, directly adjacent to Lower Saxony. The Exter and Humme rivers flow through the region. The municipality has its headquarters in the Bösingfeld district. Neighbouring cities are Rinteln, Aerzen, Barntrup, Dörentrup and Kalletal.

The highest point of the city is at 371 metres above sea level. The municipality dimensions are about 12.2 kilometres east–west and about 12.5 kilometres north–south.

== Population ==
Historical population

Year	Pop.	±% p.a.
1965	11,944	—
1970	12,916	+1.58%
1975	12,850	−0.10%
1980	12,554	−0.47%
1985	12,201	−0.57%
1990	12,606	+0.66%
1995	13,407	+1.24%

Year	Pop.	±% p.a.
2000	13,331	−0.11%
2005	12,790	−0.83%
2010	12,081	−1.13%
2015	11,522	−0.94%
2020	11,042	−0.85%
2025	11,138	+0.17%

Source: Landesdatabank Nordrhein-Westfalen

== Mayors ==
Elected in September 2020, the mayor of Extertal is Frank Meier.

== Churches and religious communities ==
- Evangelical Reformed Church (Church of Lippe) in Bösingfeld, Mittelstrasse 33
- Evangelical Reformed Church (Church of Lippe) in Almena, Kirchstrasse 1, 32699 Extertal-Almena
- Evangelical Reformed Church (Church of Lippe) in Silixen, Dietrich-Bonhoeffer-Strasse 5
- Catholic Church: Adolf-Kolping-Weg 1
- Free Evangelical Community: Mühlenstrasse 4
- Jehovah's Witnesses: Papenweg 2
- New Apostolic Church: Bahnhofstrasse
