= Kibbutz Cheruth =

Kibbutz Cheruth (Hebrew: קיבוץ חרות) was a kibbutz that existed from 1926 to around 1930 in and around the villages of Aerzen, Grießem, and Holzhausen, between Hamelin and Bad Pyrmont in what is today the state of Lower Saxony, Germany. Oriented towards Zionist and socialist ideals, the kibbutz served as a centre for Hakhshara, the vocational and cultural preparation of young Jews for emigration to Palestine.

== Background ==
The kibbutz grew out of the small youth-Zionist wandering league Brit ha-Olim, founded in 1920. The practical goal of the association was to educate its members in the values and lifestyle of the kibbutz, with the expectation that every trained young Zionist would eventually emigrate to Palestine.

In 1923, Brit ha-Olim held its national congress on the Ohrberg hill near Hamelin, attended by delegates from a kibbutz already established in Palestine. By 1925 the association had established a centre in Hameln with around 90 members.

== Founding ==
In 1926, at a gathering near Bad Pyrmont, the decision was made to formally establish a kibbutz. On 1 November 1926, ten founding members constituted Kibbutz Cheruth in the village of Grießem. The name Cheruth (freedom) was taken from the title of a 1918 lecture by the philosopher Martin Buber on youth and religion.

The initiator and driving force behind the kibbutz was Hermann Gradnauer (de), a dentist from Hameln and one of the founders and leaders of Brit ha-Olim. Gradnauer emigrated to Palestine in 1934 and settled in 1942 at Kibbutz Givʿat Brenner, where he continued to practise dentistry.
