= Exter (Weser) =

River in Germany

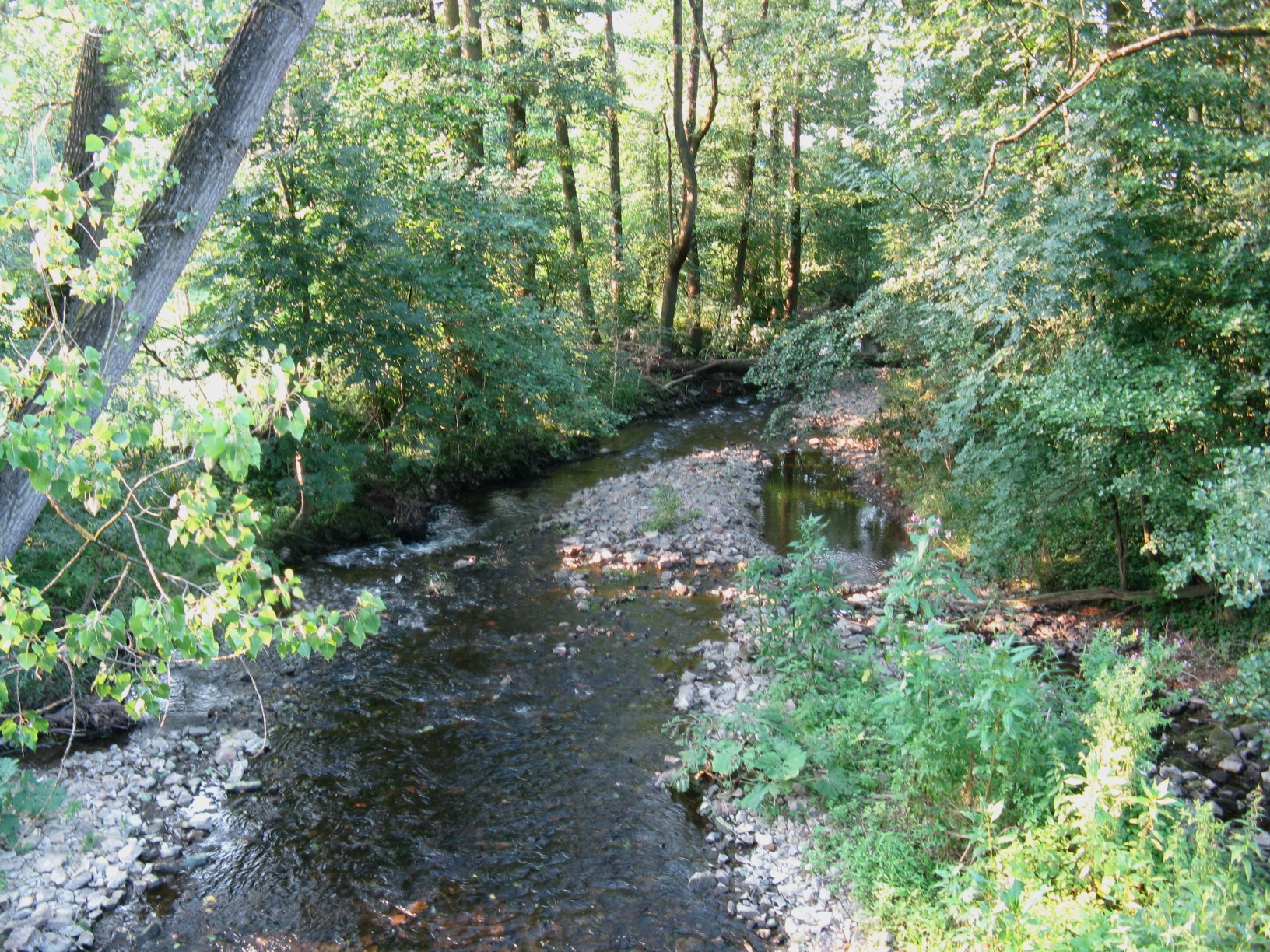
- The Exter river in a district of Extertal

Location
- Country: Germany
- States: Lower Saxony and North Rhine-Westphalia
- Districts: Schaumburg and Lippe

Physical characteristics
- Source
  - location: Barntrup
- Mouth
  - location: Weser at Rinteln
  - coordinates: 52.1903°N 9.0850°E
  - elevation: 274 m (899 ft) above NN
- Length: 26.1 km (16.2 mi)
- Basin size: 108.718 km^{2} (41.976 sq mi)

Basin features
- Progression: Weser→ North Sea

Exter (German pronunciation: [ˈɛkstɐ]) is a 26.1 km (16.2 mi) long river in Lower Saxony (district Schaumburg) and North Rhine-Westphalia (district Lippe), Germany. It flows into the Weser in Rinteln.

== History ==
The river arises from the eastern part of the district Lippe in the Teutoburg Forest / Egge Hills Nature Park. Its origin is in the municipality Barntrup, approximately one kilometre southwest of the northern district Alverdissen's centre, in an area used for agriculture.

It gave its name the municipality of Extertal (lit. Exter valley) that was founded newly in 1969.

== See also ==
- List of rivers of Lower Saxony
- List of rivers of North Rhine-Westphalia
