= Jewish Cemetery, Aerzen =

Coordinates: 52°02′30″N 9°15′23″E

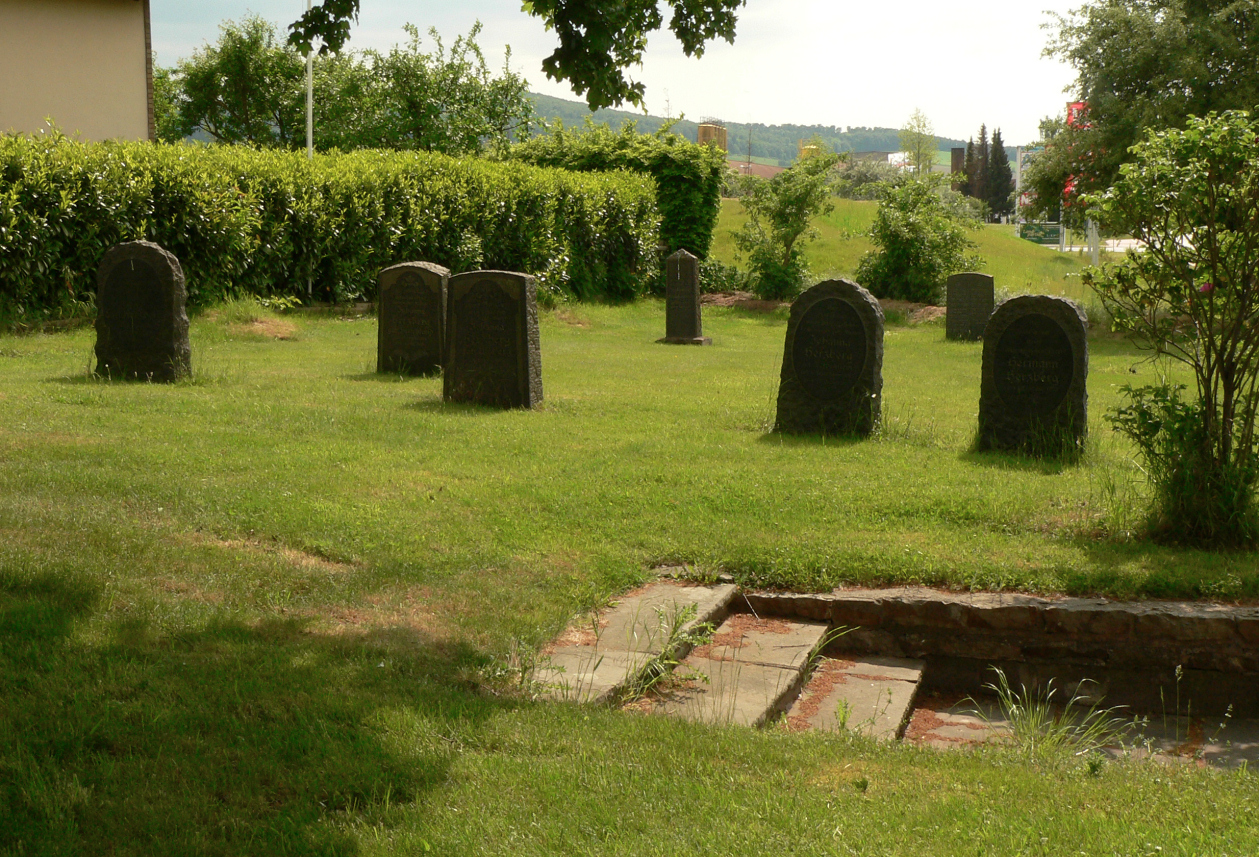
Jewish cemetery in Aerzen

The Jewish cemetery in Aerzen, is a protected cultural monument in Germany. The 649-square-metre cemetery served as the final resting place for Jews from Aerzen, Groß Berkel, and Reher. It is located at the "Kesselbreite" on Reherweg. Seven gravestones still stand there today.

== History ==
The cemetery was in use from 1897 to 1927. It was destroyed in 1938 and only partially restored after 1945.
