= Humme (Weser) =

River in Germany

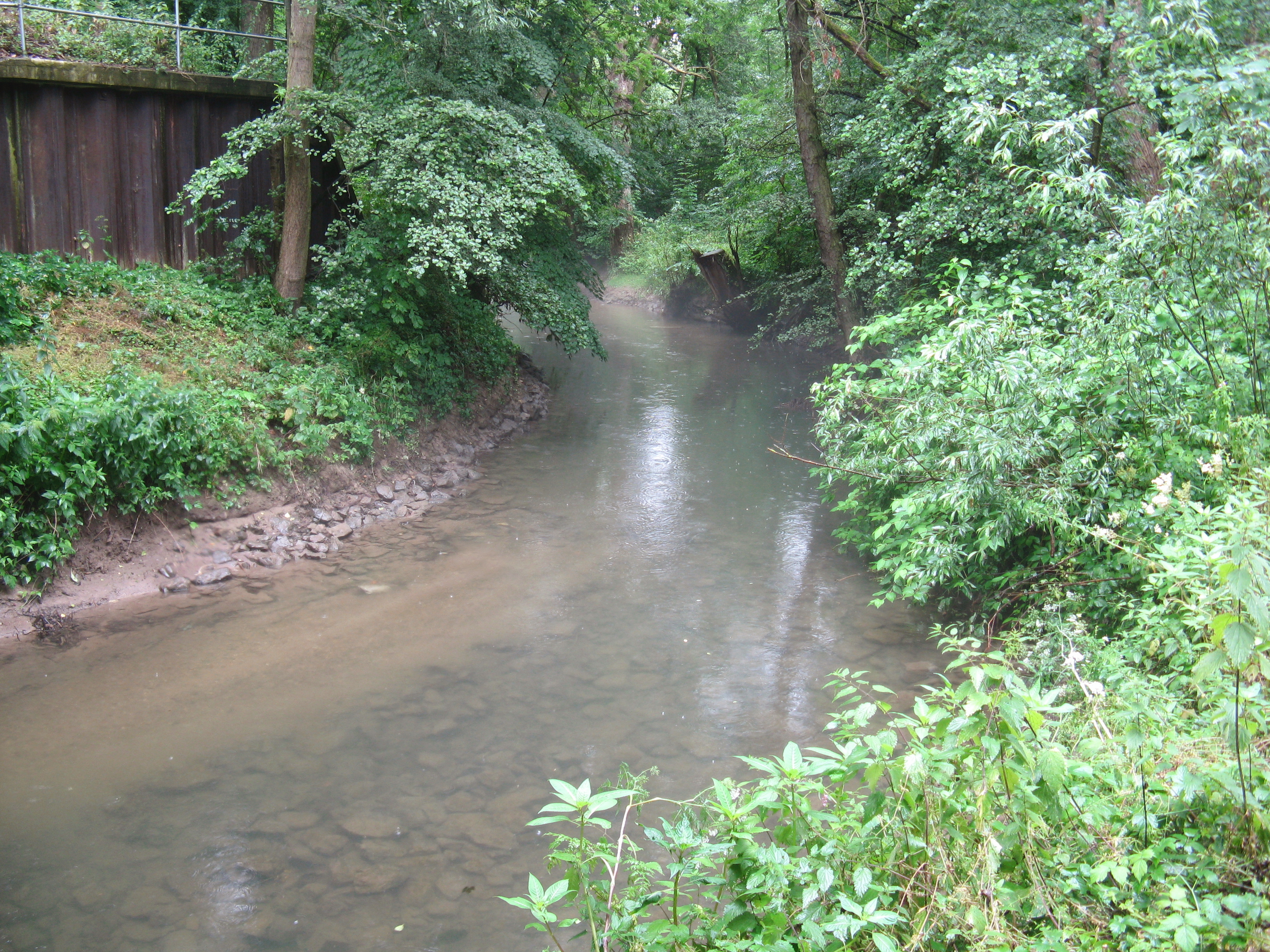
- The Humme a few hundred meters before its confluence in the Weser

Location
- Country: Germany
- State: Lower Saxony

Physical characteristics
- Mouth
  - location: Weser
  - coordinates: 52.0905°N 9.3536°E
- Length: 18.8 km (11.7 mi)

Basin features
- Progression: Weser→ North Sea

Humme is a river of Lower Saxony, Germany. Its source is at the border of North Rhine-Westphalia. It flows into the Weser near Hameln.

== See also ==
- List of rivers of Lower Saxony
