= Aerzen =

- Municipality
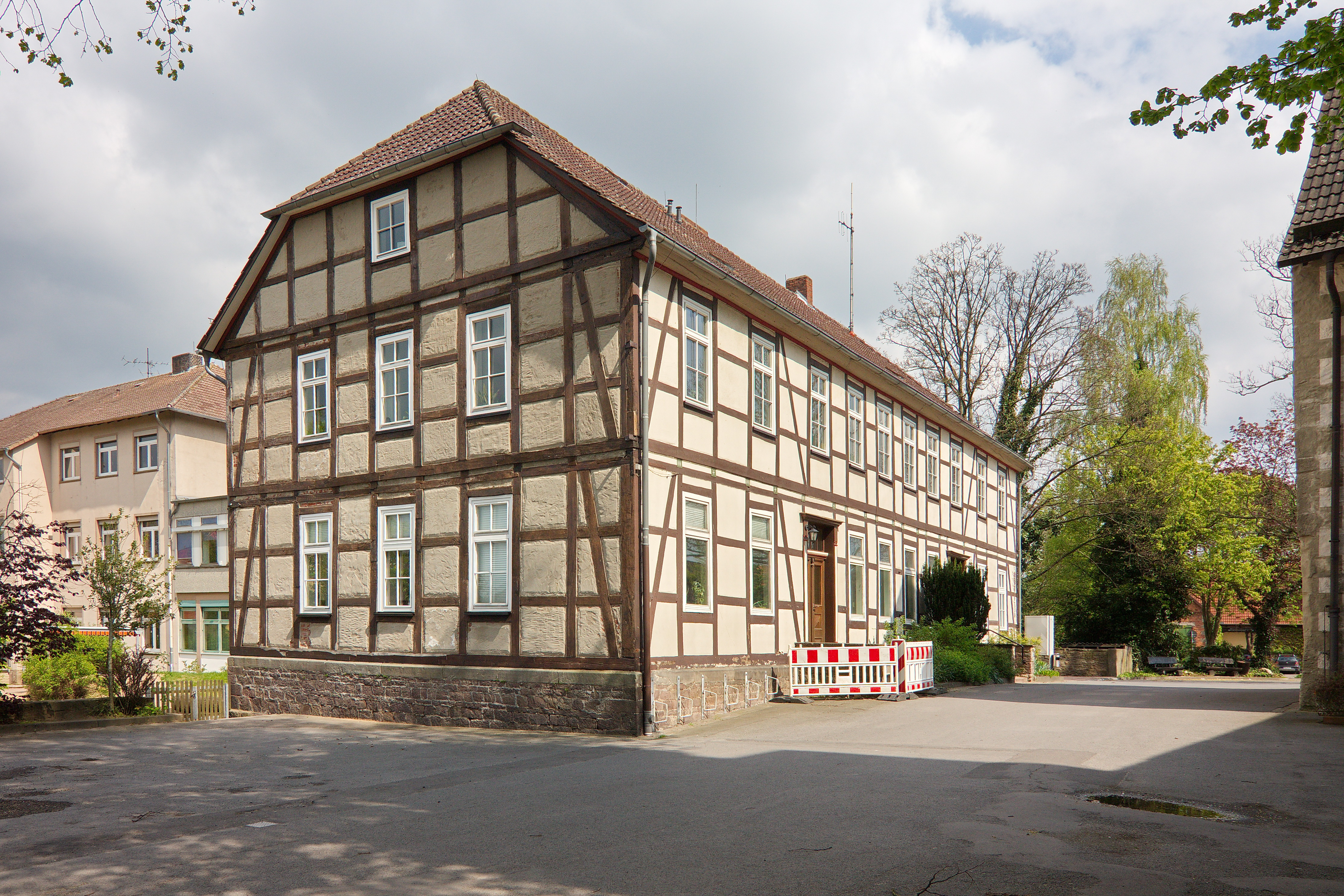
- Town hall of Aerzen

- Coat of arms

- Location of Aerzen within Hameln-Pyrmont district
- Interactive map of Aerzen
- Location within Germany Location within Lower Saxony
- Coordinates: 52°02′58″N 09°15′55″E
- Country: Germany
- State: Lower Saxony
- District: Hameln-Pyrmont
- Subdivisions: 14 Ortsteile

Government
  - Mayor (2019–24): Andreas Wittrock (SPD)

Area
  - Total: 105.26 km^{2} (40.64 sq mi)
- Elevation: 173 m (568 ft)

Population (2025-12-31)
  - Total: 10,387
  - Density: 98.679/km^{2} (255.58/sq mi)
- Time zone: UTC+01:00 (CET)
  - Summer (DST): UTC+02:00 (CEST)
- Postal codes: 31855
- Dialling codes: 05154
- Vehicle registration: HM
- Website: www.aerzen.de

Aerzen (German pronunciation: [ˈɛʁtsn̩]) is a municipality in the Hamelin-Pyrmont district, in Lower Saxony, Germany. It is situated 10 kilometres (6 mi) southwest of Hamelin, and 7 kilometres (4 mi) north of Bad Pyrmont.

== Economy ==
One of the biggest employers in the region is Aerzener Maschinenfabrik GmbH., a manufacturer of blowers and compressors. As of April 2008, they had an estimated 1000 employees.

== Architecture ==
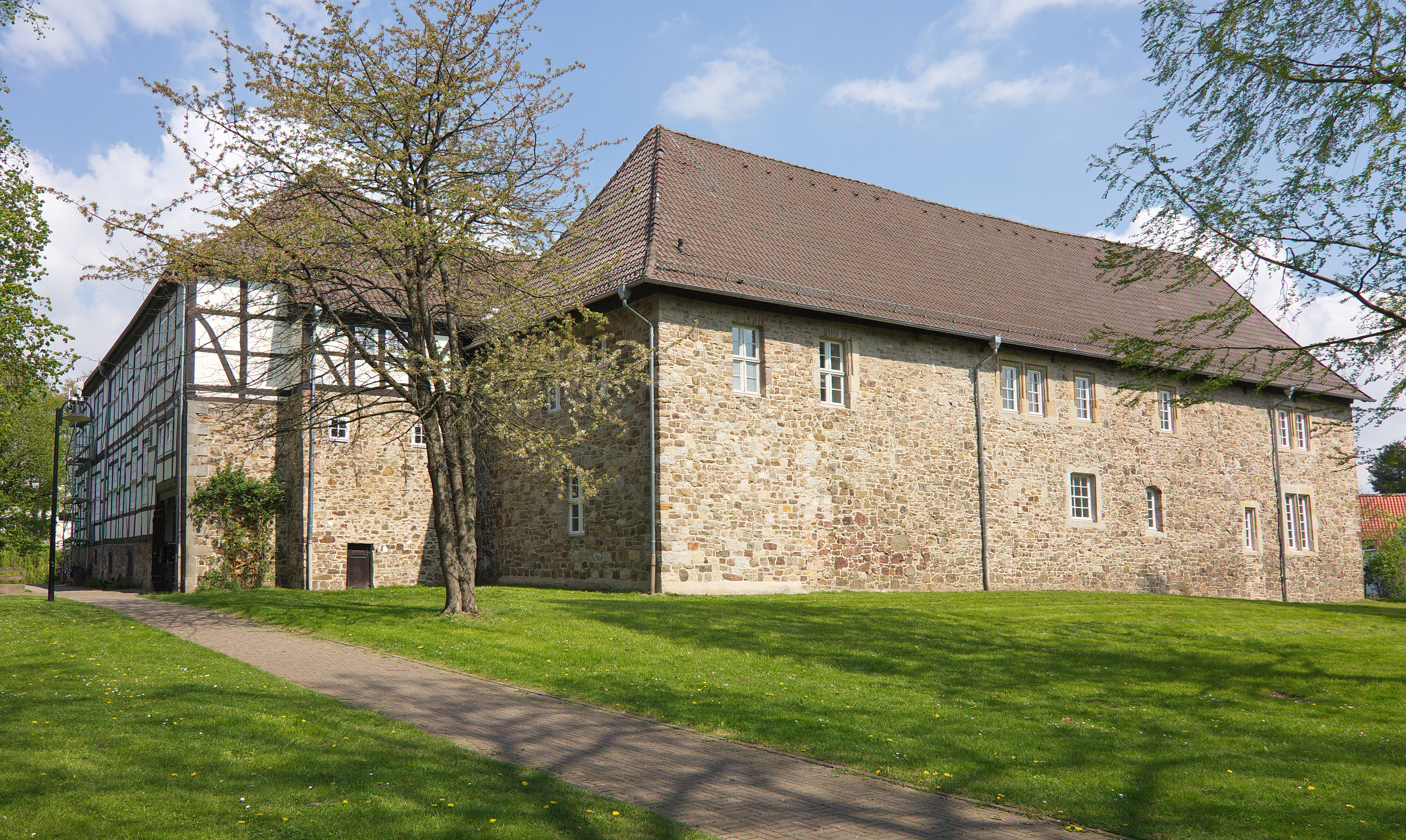
Burg Aerzen

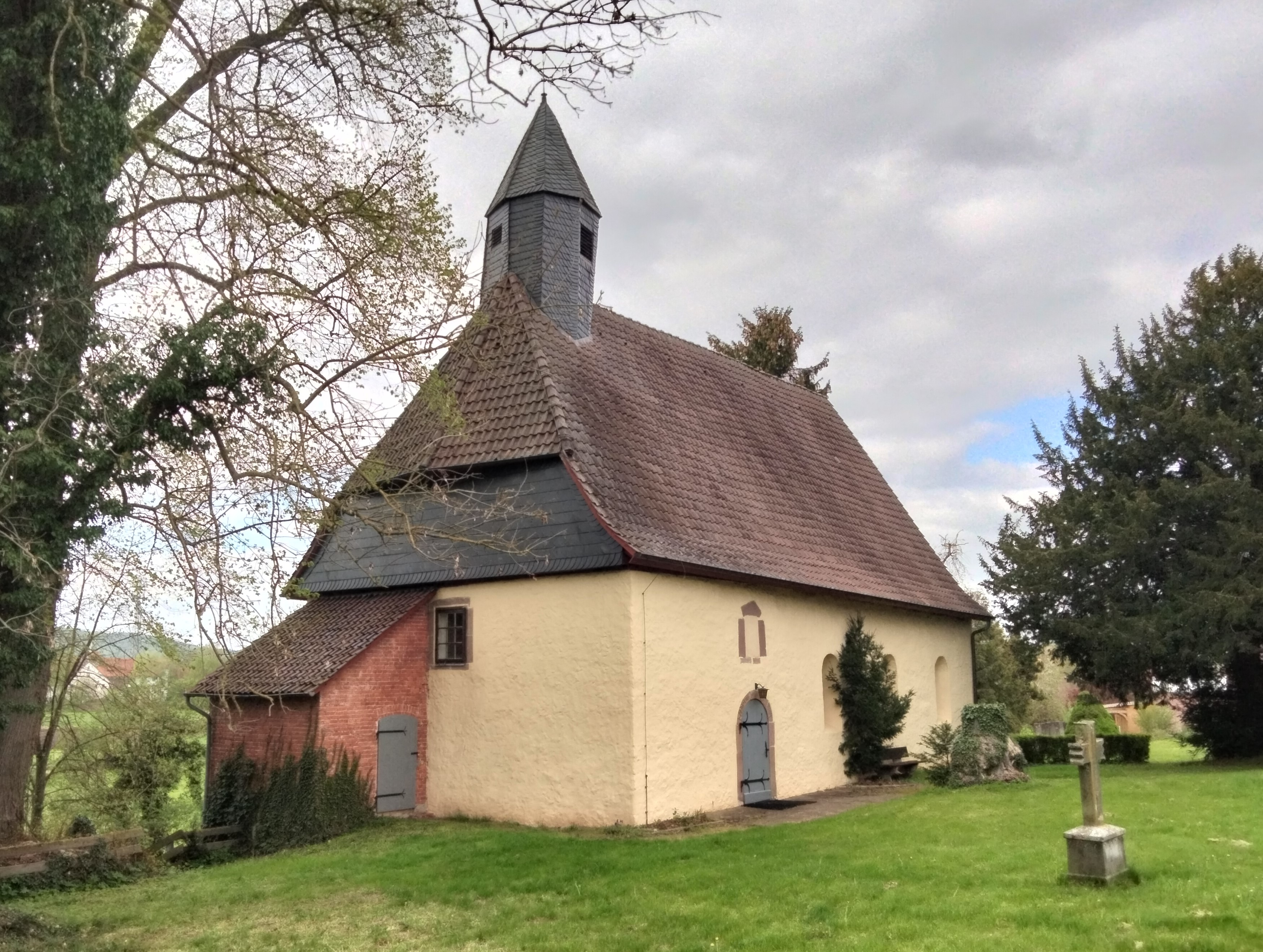
St. Johan's Chapel

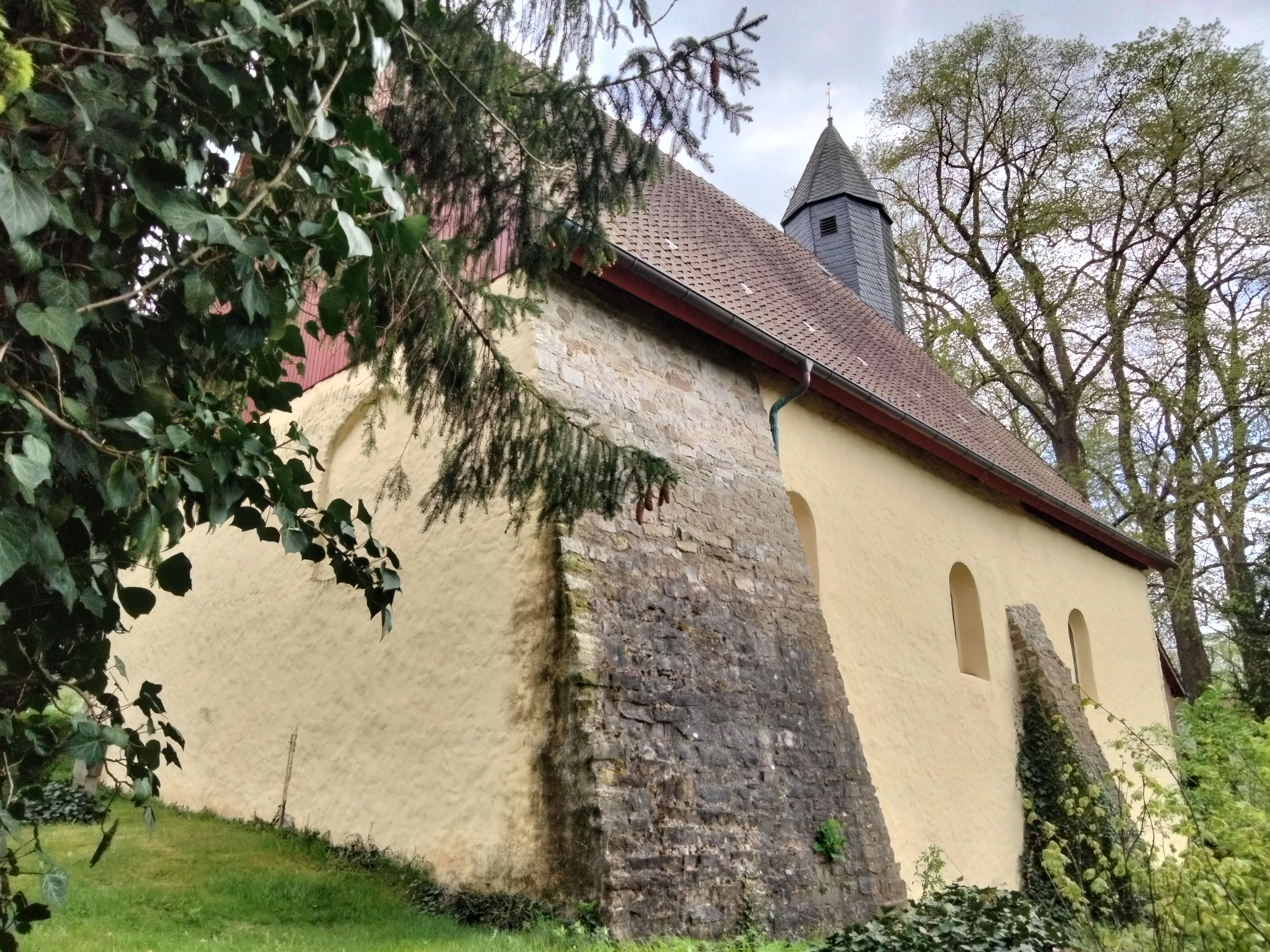
St. Johan's Chapel

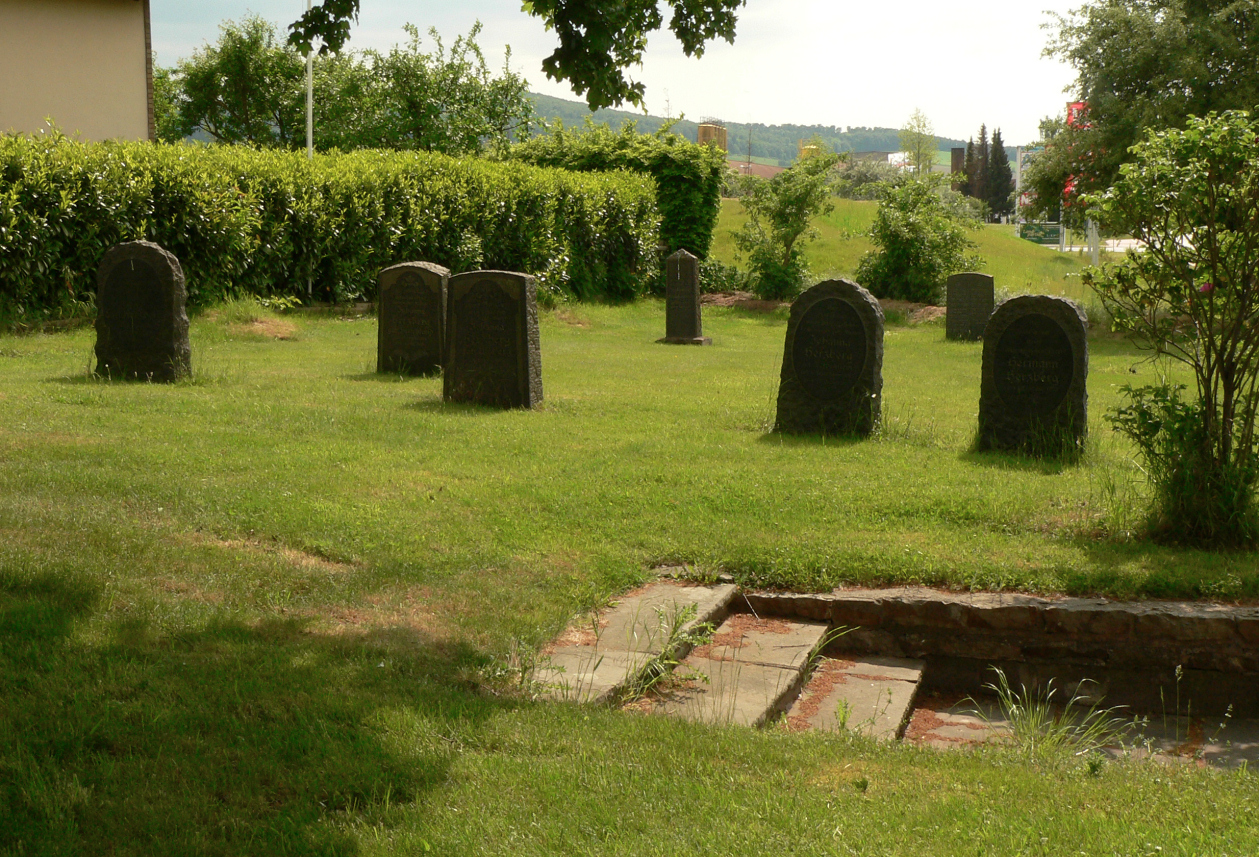
Jewish Cemetery

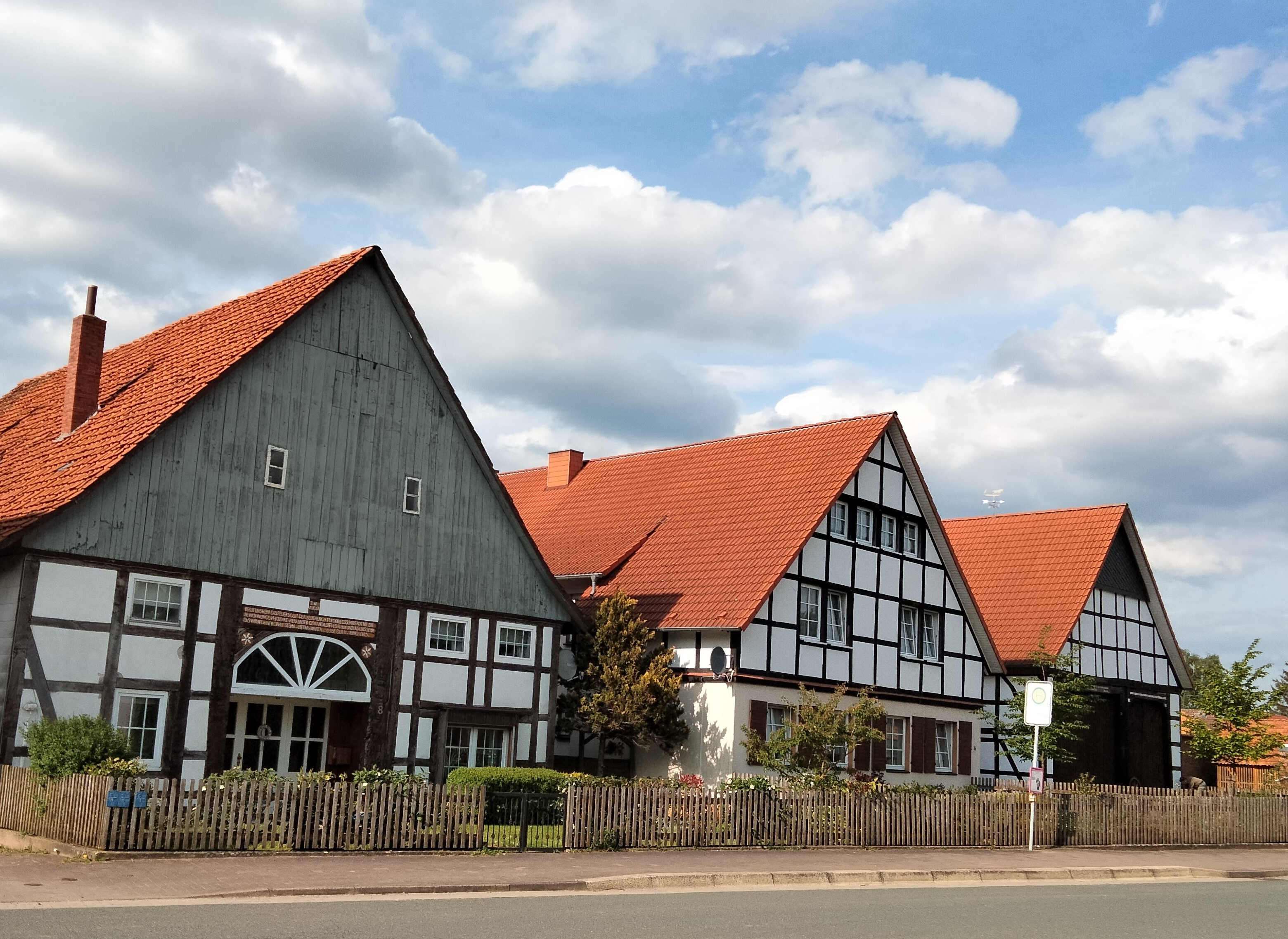
Förde street in Reher

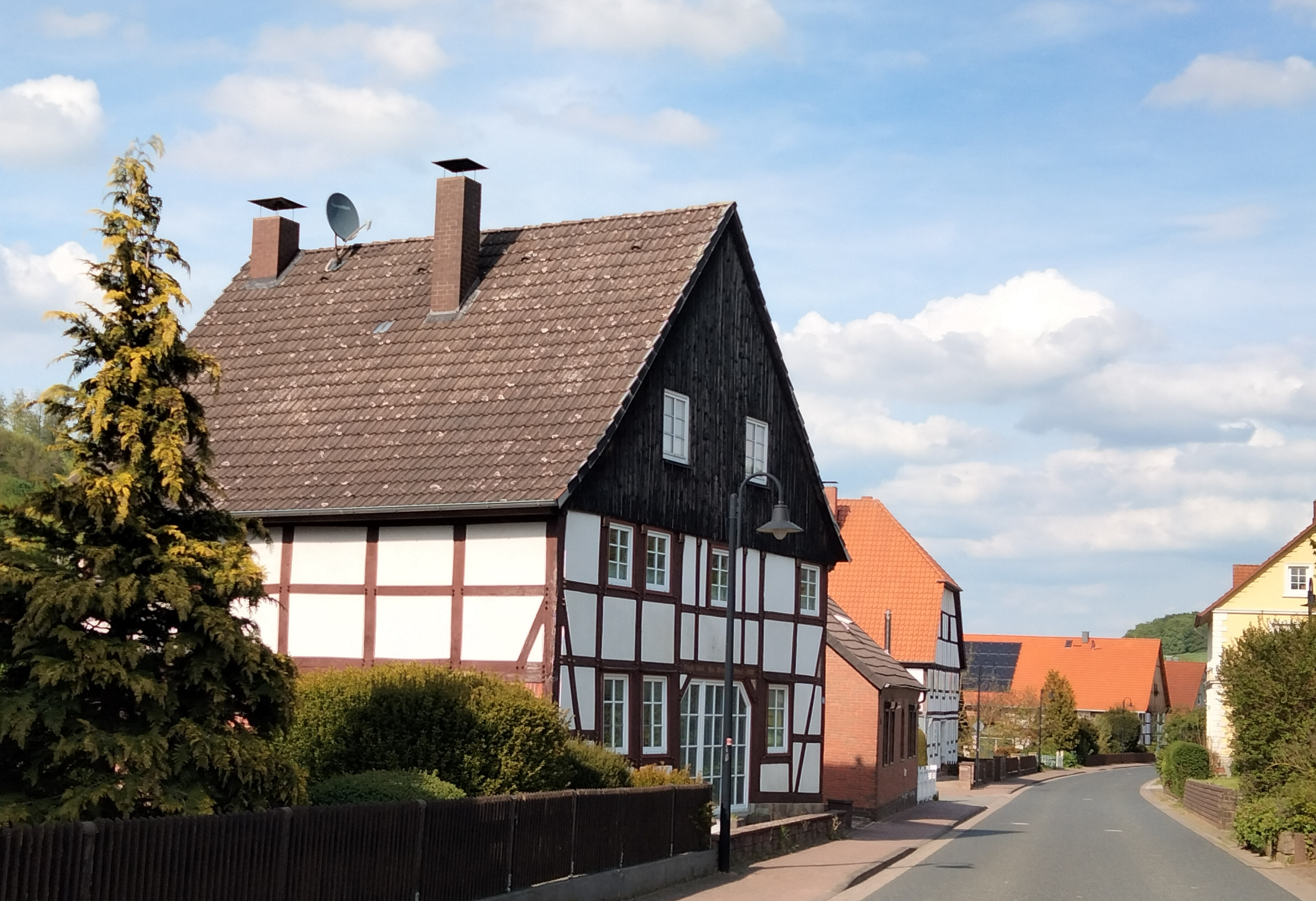
Grießem, Pyrmonter Straße

Burg Aerzen, a castle built in the 16th century, was transformed into a cultural centre.

Schloß Schwöbber is a castle built 1574-1578. The southern aisle was added in 1588, and the northern aisle was built in 1604. A part of the castle burnt down in 1908 and was rebuilt in 1922.

St. Mary's Church, an aisleless church originally built in 1143, burnt down during the Thirty Years' War in 1642 and was rebuilt in 1643.

In Reher, a village which was incorporated into Aerzen in 1973, St. John's Chapel is worth a visit. It was founded around 1100, built in a romanic style with a ridge turret covered with slabs of slate and two buttresses and enlarged in 1580. Its gothic winged altarpiece dating from 1465 was restored in 1880 and from 1967-1973. In the middle of Reher various well-preserved half-timbered houses can be visited, e.g. in "Förde" Street.

Grießem is another village which was incorporated into Aerzen in 1973. In Pyrmonter Straße, its main street, several half-timbered houses can be seen, e.g. house no. 22 dating from 1686 which was renovated in 2008.

== Jewish Cemetery ==
The Jewish cemetery in Aerzen, located at the "Kesselbreite" on Reherweg, is a protected cultural monument. The site served as the burial ground for Jews from Aerzen, Groß Berkel, and Reher, and was in use from 1897 to 1927. It was destroyed in 1938 and only partially restored after 1945. Seven gravestones still stand there today.

== Notable people ==
- Börries von Münchhausen (civil servant) (1587-1646), secret Kammerrat, mortgage holder of the Office Aerzen
- Gustav Karl Wilhelm Siemens (1806-1874), member of the National Assembly in Frankfurt
- August Heissmeyer (1897-1979), Obergruppenführer and General of the Waffen SS
