= Deaths in December 1977 =

The following is a list of notable deaths in December 1977. Entries for each day are listed alphabetically by surname. A typical entry lists information in the following sequence:

- Name, age, country of citizenship at birth, subsequent country of citizenship (if applicable), reason for notability, cause of death (if known), and reference.

== December 1977 ==
=== 1 ===
- Vasil Amashukeli, 91, Soviet Georgian filmmaker.
- Manlio Bacigalupo, 69, Italian football player and manager.
- Reginald St John Battersby, 77, British soldier, youngest commissioned British World War I soldier.
- Miguel Canela Lázaro, 83, Dominican diplomat and conservationist.
- Petre Constantinescu-Iași, 85, Romanian historian and politician.
- Knud Jespersen, 51, Danish politician.
- Kenneth O. May, 62, American mathematician.
- Yūko Mochizuki, 60, Japanese actress and politician, breast cancer.
- Michel Randria, 74, Malagasy politician.
- Joseph Schlossel, 74, American science fiction author.
- Philipp Schwartz, 83, Hungarian-American neuropathologist.
- Teun Struycken, 70, Dutch politician.
- Eric Tilley, 64, English cricketer.
- Sir Alexander Valentine, 77, British transport administrator.

=== 2 ===
- Otto Adam, 68, German Olympic fencer (1936).
- Nils Bang, 36, South African oceanographer, colon cancer.
- Jacques Beltrand, 103, French engraver.
- Leslie Hancock, 85, English-born Canadian politician, heart failure.
- Theresa Kugel, 64–65, Soviet Russian Catholic nun, complications during surgery.
- Fred Leicht, 82, American football executive.
- Agnes Maynard, 100, English scouting leader.
- Edward Pitblado, 81, British-Canadian ice hockey player.
- Ilia Vekua, 70, Soviet Georgian mathematician.
- Walter Wedgwood, 65, Australian cricketer.
- Ludwig Wieder, 77, German footballer.

=== 3 ===
- Jack Beresford, 78, British Olympic rower, five-time medalist.
- Bill Bonness, 53, American baseball player, complications from a fall.
- Roland Caillaux, 72, French actor and artist.
- Nicolae David, 62, Romanian footballer.
- Karamatullah Khan, 60, Indian tabla player.
- Rudolf Kompfner, 68, Austrian-American physicist and inventor, heart disease.
- Henri Menard, 75, French Olympic rower (1924).
- Andy Payne, 70, American law clerk and runner.

=== 4 ===
- Ali Ahmad, 47, Malaysian politician, plane crash.
- Geoffrey Anson, 55, English cricketer.
- Manuel Basté, 78, Spanish Olympic water polo player (1924).
- Sir George Coles, 92, Australian businessman.
- André Eglevsky, 59, Russian-born American ballet dancer and teacher, heart attack.
- Edith Farnsworth, 74, American nephrologist.
- Mario García Incháustegui, 53, Cuban diplomat, plane crash.
- Leila Hyams, 72, American actress.
- Sijtse Jansma, 79, Dutch Olympic tug of war player (1920).
- Anjette Lyles, 52, American restaurateur and convicted serial killer.
- Johnny Rizzo, 65, American baseball player.
- Fred Wimbridge, 84, Australian footballer.

=== 5 ===
- David K. E. Bruce, 79, American diplomat and politician, heart attack.
- Franz R. Friedl, 85, Austrian composer and violist.
- Rahsaan Roland Kirk, 42, American jazz musician, stroke.
- Jack Lake, 63, Australian footballer.
- Jon Mårdalen, 82, Norwegian Olympic skier (1924).
- Erkki Rajala, 54, Finnish Olympic ski jumper (1948).
- Cyril Thomas, 75, Welsh rugby player.
- Julian Toganivalu, 45, Fijian politician and civil servant.
- Aleksandr Vasilevsky, 82, Soviet general and politician.

=== 6 ===
- Andy Auld, 77, Scottish-American soccer player.
- Charles A. Barnard, 97, American football player and coach.
- Bruce Bartle, 39, Australian footballer.
- Roy Benson, 63, French magician and special effects artist, emphysema.
- Keith Compton, 77, Australian politician.
- Ari de Oliveira, 45, Brazilian footballer, stroke.
- Paweł Lubina, 80, Polish footballer.
- Gerald McLaughlin, 84, American jurist.
- John Pomorski, 71, American baseball player.
- Al Richardson, 42, American football player.
- Juan Antonio Suanzes, 86, Spanish naval engineer and politician.
- Frank A. Tobey, 74, American general, cancer.
- Georg Vest, 81, Danish Olympic gymnast (1920).

=== 7 ===
- Albert Andersen, 86, Danish Olympic runner (1920).
- George Ewart Bean, 73–74, English archaeologist.
- Keith Boughn, 52, American politician, member of the Nebraska Legislature (since 1977).
- Bill Boyd, 67, American singer.
- Harry Bruce, 82, Australian footballer.
- Gheorghe Cialâk, 91, Romanian general.
- Honoré de Bonald, 83, French flying ace.
- Anastasia de Torby, 85, Russian-British racehorse owner and aristocrat.
- Lawrence R. Ellzey, 86, American politician, member of the U.S. House of Representatives (1932–1935).
- Sir Basil Embry, 75, British air marshal.
- Paul Gibb, 64, English cricketer.
- Peter Carl Goldmark, 71, Hungarian-American engineer and record producer, traffic collision.
- Georges Grignard, 72, French racing driver.
- David Holden, 53, British journalist, shot.
- Adalbert Püllöck, 70, Romanian footballer.
- Alois Schwabl, 65, Austrian Olympic shot putter (1952).
- Deep Narayan Singh, 83, Indian politician.
- Denny Sothern, 73, American baseball player.
- Qamil Teliti, 55, Albanian footballer.

=== 8 ===
- Roberto Airaldi, 75, Argentine actor.
- Hugh Alessandroni, 69, American Olympic fencer (1932).
- Luise Brunner, 69, German concentration camp guard.
- Art Ewoldt, 83, American baseball player.
- Santiago Fonacier, 92, Filipino politician and priest.
- Stanley Lawrence Greenslade, 72, English theologian.
- Masao Mimatsu, 89, Japanese postmaster and volcanologist.
- Ernő Nagy, 79, Hungarian Olympic fencer (1932).
- Carlton R. Rouh, 58, American soldier, Medal of Honor recipient.
- Adolph Samborski, 73, American baseball coach.
- Alma Seidler, 78, Austrian actress.

=== 9 ===
- Dionisio Calvo, 73, Filipino basketball player and coach.
- Olive Fraser, 68, Scottish poet.
- Elizabeth Hanniford, 68, American politician, member of the New York State Assembly (1947–1950).
- Bennett Hill, 84, American racing driver.
- Arthur N. Holcombe, 93, American political scientist.
- Clarice Lispector, 56, Russian-born Brazilian novelist, ovarian cancer.
- Barbara Mitchell, 48, English actress, breast cancer.
- Dario Poggi, 68, Italian Olympic bobsledder (1948).
- Boye Schlytter, 86, Norwegian mountaineer and businessman.
- Frederick Davis Shaw, 68, Canadian politician, MP (1940–1958).

=== 10 ===
- Carlo Biotti, 76, Italian jurist.
- Nirmal Chatterjee, 59, Indian cricketer.
- Ethel Roosevelt Derby, 86, American socialite and civil rights activist, daughter of Theodore Roosevelt, bronchitis.
- Ákos Elekfy, 54, Hungarian Olympic speed skater (1948).
- August W. Farwick, 75, American football player and coach.
- Nariman Irani, 48–49, Indian filmmaker, complications from blunt force trauma.
- Karel Kaufman, 79, Dutch football player and manager.
- Louise Lincoln Kerr, 85, American musician and composer, heart failure.
- Reg Ledwidge, 54–55, Australian cricket umpire, stroke.
- E. William Martin, 86, Scottish-born American architect.
- Ralph E. Oesper, 91, American chemist and historian.
- Adolph Rupp, 76, American basketball coach, spinal cancer.
- Azucena Villaflor, 53, Argentine activist (Mothers of Plaza de Mayo), death flight.
- Carl Wagner, 76, German chemist.

=== 11 ===
- Rafael Ajlec, 62, Slovenian musicologist and journalist.
- Taqi al-Din al-Nabhani, 62–63, Palestinian Islamic scholar.
- Bissietta, 67, Italian artist.
- Dick Klawitter, 48, American football player.
- Berith Melin, 59, American baseball player.
- Saida Menebhi, 24–25, Moroccan poet and activist, starvation during hunger strike.
- Sir Hugh Robson, 60, Scottish physician and academic administrator.
- Neil Williams, 42–43, Canadian-born Welsh aerobatic pilot, plane crash.

=== 12 ===
- Scott Alden, 70, American FBI official and sports coach.
- Sir Gilmour Anderson, 63, British politician and soldier.
- Raymond Bernard, 86, French filmmaker.
- Frank Boucher, 76, Canadian ice hockey player and executive, cancer.
- Clementine Churchill, 92, British socialite, spouse of the prime minister (1940–1945, 1951–1955), heart attack.
- Gaston Delaplane, 95, French rower and Olympic cyclist (1908).
- Bernard Doyle, 89, Irish Olympic cyclist (1912).
- Arthur Erdélyi, 69, Hungarian-born British mathematician.
- Allan Fraser, 75, Australian politician, MP (1943–1966, 1969–1972).
- Claude Hubert, 63, French Olympic racewalker (1948, 1952).
- Grethe Rask, 46–47, Danish physician, AIDS.
- Wilhelm Stör, 84, German flying ace.
- Jack L. Treadwell, 58, American soldier, Medal of Honor recipient, complications from heart surgery.

=== 13 ===
- Oğuz Atay, 43, Turkish novelist, brain cancer.
- Edmund Crawford, 71, English football player and manager.
- Bonifacio De Bortoli, 53, Italian Olympic rower (1948).
- Silvano Filippelli, 58, Italian politician, aneurysm.
- Guy Frégault, 59, Canadian historian.
- Fred Glasse, 88, New Zealand politician and electrical engineer.
- Jack Charles Hillman, 84, Canadian politician.
- Tadashi Maeda, 79, Japanese naval admiral.
- Héctor Méndez, 80, Argentine Olympic boxer (1924).
- Kuniyoshi Obara, 90, Japanese education reformer and publisher.
- Sir Charles Petrie, 3rd Baronet, 82, British historian and hereditary peer.
- Haakon Storøy, 70, Norwegian politician.
- Bobby Watson, 35, American basketball coach, plane crash.

=== 14 ===
- Martin Abendroth, 94, German opera singer.
- Chen Shaomin, 74–75, Chinese politician.
- G. D. Madgulkar, 58, Indian poet and lyricist.
- Arthur Morley, 69, Australian footballer.
- John Henry McQueen, 61, American baseball player.
- Walter Scott-Elliot, 82, British politician, MP (1945–1950), bludgeoned.
- Allen K. Wood, 79, American assistant film director.

=== 15 ===
- Rudolf Cvetko, 97, Slovenian Olympic fencer (1912).
- Hans Diller, 72, German historian.
- Alexander Galich, 59, Soviet poet, playwright, and dissident, electrocuted.
- Arnold Hazeland Jr., 77, Norwegian jurist.
- Peter Kerrigan, 78, British political activist.
- Wilfred Kitching, 84, British writer, general of The Salvation Army (1954–1963).
- Clarice Short, 67, American poet.
- H. E. Stokke, 77, Norwegian politician and businessman.
- John Verpoorten, 37, American comic book artist.
- Hildegard Woodward, 79, American children's author.

=== 16 ===
- Gustaf Aulén, 98, Swedish theologian and Lutheran bishop.
- Risto Jarva, 43, Finnish filmmaker, traffic collision.
- Arthur Justice, 75, Australian rugby player and coach.
- Yngve Larsson, 96, Swedish politician and urban planner.
- Rikard Long, 88, Faroese politician and writer.
- Jack Neale, 60, English footballer.
- Our Babu, 24–25, Irish-born British Thoroughbred racehorse.
- James Page, 77, British rower.
- Thomas Schippers, 47, American conductor, lung cancer.
- Hideo Sekigawa, 69, Japanese film director.
- Edwin L. Sibert, 80, American general, aneurysm.
- Roop Singh, 69, Indian field hockey player.
- Johan Sundkvist, 88, Swedish Olympic runner (1912).
- Donald Thomas, 45, American racing driver.
- Ernest Wright, 83, English cricketer.

=== 17 ===
- Elíseo Arango Ramos, 77, Colombian diplomat and politician.
- Spasenija Babović, 70, Yugoslav politician.
- Mary Brennan, 67, American politician, member of the Connecticut House of Representatives (1951–1953).
- Sir Ralph Cochrane, 82, Scottish air marshal.
- Bessie Guthrie, 72, Australian feminist activist.
- Irene Kirpal, 91, Czech politician, MP (1920–1938).
- S. L. A. Marshall, 77, American journalist, historian and general, cardiopulmonary arrest.
- Dick Noble, 62, Australian footballer.
- Wim Prinsen, 32, Dutch racing cyclist.
- Sammy Sessions, 42, American racing driver, snowmobile crash.
- László Szekfű, 72, Hungarian Olympic wrestler (1932).
- Lawrence Turner, 68, English politician, MP (1950–1959).
- Frank Wilton, 72, American football player and coach.
- David Young III, 72, American politician, member of the New Jersey General Assembly (1941–1946) and Senate (1947–1953).

=== 18 ===
- Sir James Bowes-Lyon, 60, British general.
- Hans Brenner, 65, Swiss Olympic swimmer (1936).
- Maureen Cusack, 57, Irish actress.
- Marriner S. Eccles, 87, American economist, chairman of the Federal Reserve (1934–1948).
- Yakov Flier, 65, Soviet pianist.
- Leniel Hooker, 58, American baseball player.
- Michio Nishizawa, 56, Japanese baseball player.
- Graham Pratten, 78, Australian politician, MP (1928–1929).
- Francisco Rolão Preto, 84, Portuguese politician.
- Cyril Ritchard, 79, Australian actor (Peter Pan, The Hobbit), complications from a heart attack.
- Rachel Sargent Robinson, 86, American classical scholar.
- Louis Untermeyer, 92, American poet.

=== 19 ===
- Mario Borgiotti, 71, Italian painter.
- Oskar Brázda, 90, Czech painter.
- Ellen Brockhöft, 84, German Olympic figure skater (1928).
- Severino Caveri, 69, Italian politician.
- Harry J. Davenport, 75, American politician, member of the U.S. House of Representatives (1949–1951).
- Francis Clyde Duffy, 87, American politician, lieutenant governor of North Dakota (1957–1959).
- Sir Ellsworth Flavelle, 85, Canadian photographer and hereditary peer.
- Henry Walter Jack, 86, Irish agriculturalist.
- Jan Knothe, 65, Polish architect and diplomat.
- Takeo Kurita, 88, Japanese naval admiral.
- Ralph Camroux Morris, 82, British naturalist and conservationist.
- Wing F. Ong, 73, Chinese-born American politician, member of the Arizona House of Representatives (1946–1950) and Senate (1966–1968).
- Jorge Pardon, 72, Peruvian footballer.
- Nellie Tayloe Ross, 101, American politician and banker, governor of Wyoming (1925–1927), director of the United States Mint (1933–1953), heart disease.
- José María Martínez Sánchez-Arjona, 72, Spanish politician.
- Copeland Shelden, 69–70, American orthodontist.
- A. Maceo Smith, 74, American civil rights activist.
- Clay Spohn, 79, American artist.
- Jacques Tourneur, 73, French-born American filmmaker (Out of the Past, Cat People, Days of Glory).

=== 20 ===
- John Carmichael, 84, British soldier.
- Walter Drechsel, 75, German politician.
- Michael Eden, 7th Baron Henley, 63, British politician and hereditary peer, member of the House of Lords (since 1962)
- Big Chief Ellis, 63, American blues musician, heart failure.
- Nik Ahmad Kamil, 68, Malaysian politician, heart attack.
- José Vicente León, 34, Spanish Olympic swimmer (1960).
- Mary Louise Lester, 58, American baseball player.
- Eduardo Reguera, 86, Spanish footballer.
- Henry Tandey, 86, British soldier.

=== 21 ===
- Alexander Cann, 74, Canadian journalist and actor.
- Elsa Ebbesen, 87, Swedish actress.
- Maria Fedecka, 72–73, Polish social worker and humanitarian.
- Seán Keating, 88, Irish painter.
- Tom Mallin, 50, English novelist and playwright.
- Ted Mattner, 84, Australian politician.
- Aquiles Roggero, 64, Argentine musician.
- Sir Herbert Seddon, 74, English surgeon.
- C. T. Singleton Jr., 72, American naval admiral.

=== 22 ===
- Rosette Anday, 78, Hungarian singer.
- Georges Bellenger, 99, French pilot and soldier.
- Bert Burridge, 79, English footballer.
- Johann Nepomuk David, 82, Austrian composer.
- Harry Dussell, 77, Australian footballer.
- Duke Fishman, 71, Filipino-American actor.
- Karl John, 72, German actor, cardiovascular disease.
- Jack Martin, 60, American football player and coach.
- Bernard Masson, 29, French racing cyclist.
- Joseph Moutschen, 82, Belgian architect.
- Harald Christian Nielsen, 85, Danish silver designer.
- Johannes Pedersen, 94, Danish theologian.
- Lotte Schöne, 86, Austrian singer.
- P. A. Sheppard, 70, English meteorologist.
- Frank Thiess, 87, German writer.
- Fritz Werner, 79, German conductor and composer.

=== 23 ===
- Holly Broadbent Sr., 83, American orthodontist.
- Philipp Etter, 86, Swiss politician, president (1953).
- Raymond McGrath, 74, Australian-born Irish architect.
- Wilhelm Moberg, 79, Swedish Olympic sailor (1936).
- William Fellowes Morgan Jr., 88, American businessman.
- Ruth Whitehead Whaley, 76, American lawyer.

=== 24 ===
- Samael Aun Weor, 60, Colombian-Mexican spiritualist leader, stomach cancer.
- Nalini Bala Devi, 79, Indian poet.
- Bernard Gregory, 58, French physicist.
- Mario Imperoli, 46, Italian filmmaker.
- Sir Roy Jack, 63, New Zealand politician, MP (since 1954).
- Peruchín, 64, Cuban pianist.
- Albert Poffenberger, 92, American psychologist.
- Ronald Pryor, 76, Brazilian cricketer.
- Fern Shollenberger, 54, American baseball player, traffic collision.
- Bahadur Singh of Bundi, 57, Indian traditional ruler, maharao raja of Bundi (since 1945).
- Cafo Beg Ulqini, 84, Albanian politician.
- Juan Velasco Alvarado, 67, Peruvian politician, president (1968–1975), sepsis.
- Edmund Veesenmayer, 73, German Nazi official and war criminal.
- Johnny White, 45, American racing driver, heart attack.

=== 25 ===
- Tom Aitchison, 70, Scottish rugby player.
- Bruno Ballante, 71, Italian footballer.
- Sir Charlie Chaplin, 88, English actor (Modern Times, The Great Dictator, The Kid) and filmmaker, stroke.
- Eric Evans, 75, British Anglican prelate.
- Tom Fitzmaurice, 79, Australian footballer.
- Joe Fluerty, 74, New Zealand mountaineer.
- Thelma Given, 81, American violinist, stroke.
- Ken Guettler, 50, American baseball player.
- Frank P. Keller, 64, American film editor (Bullitt).
- Maud Worcester Makemson, 86, American astronomer.
- Elida Morris, 91, American singer and comedian.
- Salvatore Papaccio, 87, Italian singer.
- Ian Pettitt, 67, Australian politician, MP (1963–1972).
- József Reményi, 90, Hungarian artist and coin designer.
- Oliver P. Smith, 84, American general.
- Harald Strøm, 80, Norwegian speed skater and footballer.
- Raymond Sunderland, 56, English composer and organist.
- Stanisława Umińska, 76, Polish actress.

=== 26 ===
- Henk Angenent, 47, Dutch footballer.
- Hugh Ashdown, 73, British Anglican prelate.
- Charles Cudworth, 69, English musicologist.
- Len Evans, 74, Welsh footballer.
- Laura Fermi, 70, Italian-American writer, cardiac arrest.
- Alberto Gainza Paz, 78, Argentine journalist, esophageal cancer.
- Howard Hawks, 81, American filmmaker (Sergeant York, Gentlemen Prefer Blondes, The Big Sleep), complications from a fall.
- Edward Hewetson, 75, English cricketer.
- Karl Küpfmüller, 80, German electrical engineer.
- William L. Langer, 81, American historian and intelligence analyst.
- Al Mahon, 68, American baseball player.
- Jack Muller, 57, Australian footballer.
- Gina Palerme, 92, French actress and dancer.
- Jess Quatse, 69, American football player.
- Jimmy Walsh, 66, Irish hurler.

=== 27 ===
- Mildred Bendall, 86, French painter.
- Andy Blair, 69, Canadian ice hockey player.
- W.J. Brennan-Whitmore, 91, Irish revolutionary and political activist.
- Sam Brown, 38, American jazz guitarist.
- Alexandru Ciucurencu, 74, Romanian painter.
- Geoffrey Drake-Brockman, 92, Australian engineer and soldier.
- Giovanni Mardersteig, 85, German-Italian typographer.
- James Marshall, 69, Scottish footballer.
- Voldemar Panso, 57, Estonian actor.
- Sir Robert Pigot, 6th Baronet, 95, English general.
- Mieken Rieck, 85, German tennis player.
- Carla Rust, 69, German actress.
- S. M. Shrinagesh, 74, Indian general and politician, complications from Parkinson's disease.

=== 28 ===
- Sir Richard Barrett-Lennard, 79, British banker.
- Heloise Bowles Cruse, 58, American newspaper columnist, complications from a heart attack.
- Charlotte Greenwood, 87, American actress and dancer.
- Karin Grech, 15, Maltese child, letter bomb.
- Fred Gushurst, 87, American football player and coach.
- Leslie Keith, 71, American bluegrass musician.
- Sumitranandan Pant, 77, Indian poet.
- Karl Tekusch, 87, Austrian footballer.

=== 29 ===
- Leonardo Bonzi, 75, Italian aviator, filmmaker, and Olympic bobsledder (1924).
- Jimmy Brown, 67, American baseball player and coach.
- Louis Budts, 87, Belgian racing cyclist.
- Henry Ellis Harris, 75, American philatelist.
- Otto Frostman, 70, Swedish mathematician.
- Sujono Hadinoto, 62, Indonesian diplomat and politician.
- Pauline Lacroix, 85, French painter.
- Hugo Lahtinen, 86, Finnish Olympic track and field athlete (1920).
- Mickey MacGowan, 77, Canadian Olympic boxer (1924).
- Eudocio Rivas, 88, Chilean politician.

=== 30 ===
- Katherine Garrison Chapin, 87, American poet and playwright.
- Hector Gooderham, 68, British Episcopalian prelate.
- Halsey Hall, 79, American sportscaster.
- Augustine Ngom Jua, 53, Cameroonian politician.
- Hugo Laur, 84, Estonian actor.
- P. J. Moriarty, 68, Irish-born American restaurateur, cancer.
- St. Louis Jimmy Oden, 74, American blues musician, pneumonia.
- Helen Parsons, 91, American biochemist.
- Thornel Schwartz, 50, American jazz guitarist.
- Américo Tesoriere, 78, Argentine footballer.
- Masao Tsukada, 63, Japanese shogi player.
- Camille Wolff, 83, Luxembourgian Olympic tennis player (1924).

=== 31 ===
- Sabah Al-Salim Al-Sabah, 64, Kuwaiti royal, emir (since 1965), cancer.
- Julie E. Backer, 87, Norwegian statistician.
- Timothy Brown, 88, American jurist.
- Léonce Corne, 83, French actor.
- Dave Duff, 76, Australian footballer.
- Allan Fleming, 48, Canadian graphic designer, cardiopulmonary arrest.
- Harry Green, 56, Australian footballer.
- Charles C. Hartmann, 88, American architect.
- Robert Humphreys, 84, American politician, member of the U.S. Senate (1956).
- Nora Marlowe, 62, American actress.
- Georges Rolot, 88, French Olympic runner (1912).
- Lear Wood, 92, Barbadian cricketer.
