= Dirk-Ulrich Mende =

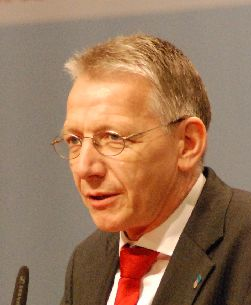
- Mende in 2009

Member of the Bundestag; for Göttingen
- In office 25 January 2023 – 25 March 2025
- Preceded by: Andreas Philippi
- Succeeded by: Fritz Güntzler

Personal details
- Born: 26 December 1957 (age 68) Münster, West Germany
- Party: Social Democratic
- Children: 3
- Education: Marburg University; University of Göttingen

Dirk-Ulrich Mende (born 26 December 1957) is a German politician of the Social Democratic Party (SPD) who served as a member of the German Bundestag from 2023 to 2025. and was the Lord Mayor (Oberbürgermeister) of the town of Celle in North Germany.

== Early life and education ==
Mende studied law in Marburg and Göttingen and passed his state legal exams in 1987.

Thereafter Mende was employed as the president of the regional council in Kassel, at the former Federal Office for the Recognition of Refugees (now the Federal Ministry of Migration (Bundesamt für Migration), at the Hesse State Welfare Agency (Landeswohlfahrtsverband Hessen) in Kassel, at the Schleswig-Holstein State Insurance Institution (Landesversicherungsanstalt Schleswig-Holstein) and at Lower Saxony's State Ministry for Social Welfare, Women, Families and Health (Niedersächsisches Ministerium für Soziales, Frauen, Familie und Gesundheit).

== Political career ==
=== Career in local politics ===
Since 1975 Mende has been a member of the SPD and since 1972 an honorary member of the Worker's Welfare Association (Arbeiterwohlfahrt).

From 1999 to 2003 Mende was the managing director of the SPD parliamentary group in the State Parliament of Lower Saxony. From 2003 to 2008 Mende was the divisional head (Referatsleiter) of the Lower Saxon Ministry for Home Affairs, Sport and Integration. There he worked for five years in the area of administrative modernisation and then in the field of integration.

From 22 February 2009 Mende served as the Lord Mayor (Oberbürgermeister) of the town of Celle in Lower Saxony, having won at the first vote with a clear and "surprising" majority of 50.8%. He has been elected for a term of office lasting to 2017.

Mende lost the 2016 elections against his CDU opponent Jörg Nigge. Therefore, his regular period in office ended in February 2017.

=== Member of the German Parliament (2023–2025) ===
In the 2021 German federal election, Mende contested Celle – Uelzen but came second. In 2023, he moved up the list after Andreas Philippi resigned. He served on the Health Committee.

== Other activities ==
- Securvita BKK, Member of the Supervisory Board

== Personal life ==
Mende is married with three children.
