= Incháustegui =

Incháustegui is a surname. Notable people with the surname include:

- Juan Incháustegui (1938–2019), Peruvian politician and minister
- Mario García Incháustegui (1924–1977), Cuban Ambassador to Japan
- Teresa Incháustegui (born 1952), Mexican politician
