= Hazeland =

Hazeland is a surname. Notable people with the surname include:

- Arnold Hazeland (1859–1945), Norwegian attorney and Supreme Court Justice
- Arnold Hazeland Jr. (1900–1977), Norwegian civil servant and judge
