= Hiltrud Lotze =

German politician

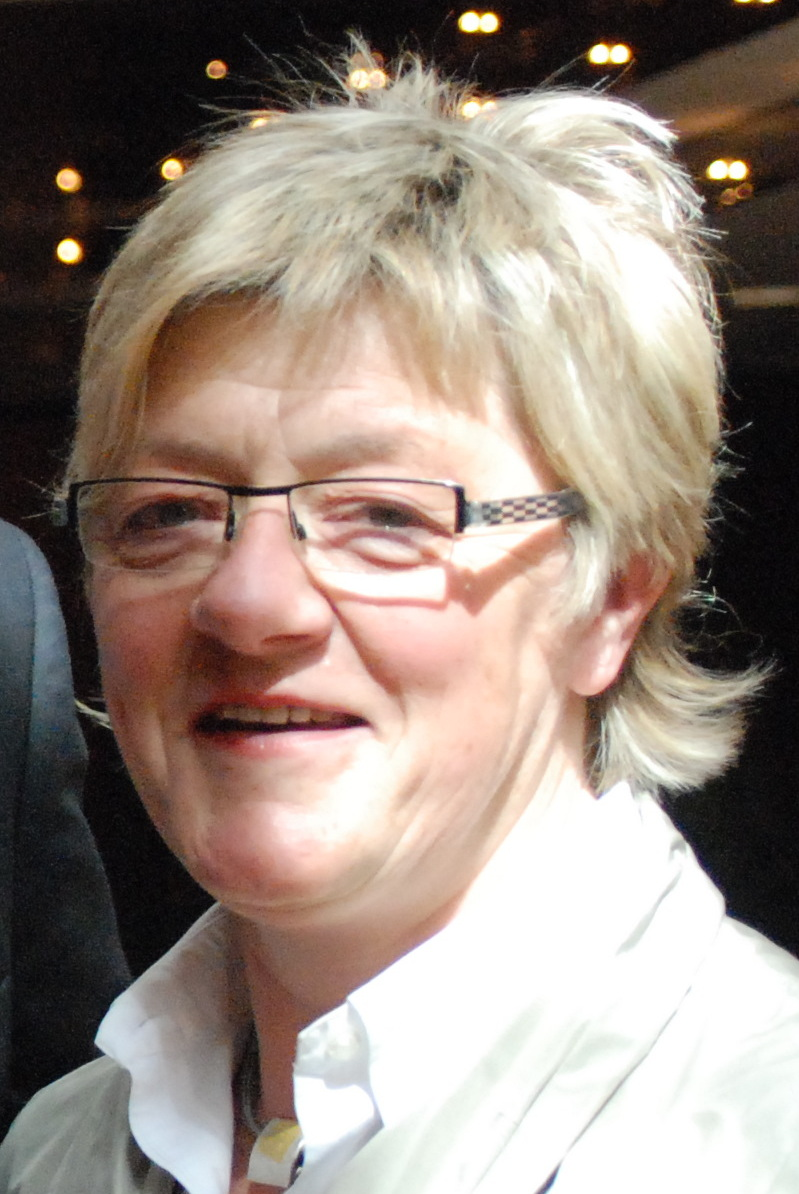
- Lotze in 2010

Member of the Bundestag; from Lower Saxony
- In office 24 November 2020 – 26 October 2021
- Preceded by: Thomas Oppermann
- Succeeded by: Andreas Philippi
- Constituency: Göttingen
- In office 22 October 2013 – 24 October 2017
- Constituency: State list

Personal details
- Born: 13 November 1958 (age 68) Nentershausen, Hesse, West Germany
- Party: Social Democratic
- Education: Leuphana University of Lüneburg

Hiltrud Lotze (born 24 November 1958) is a German policewoman and politician of the Social Democratic Party (SPD) who served as a member of the Bundestag from the state of Lower Saxony from 2013 to 2017, and again from 2020 to 2021.

== Political career ==
Lotze became a member of the German Bundestag as a successor to Thomas Oppermann in November 2020. She is a member of the Committee on Food and Agriculture.
