= Charles Singleton =

Charles Singleton may refer to:

- Charles Laverne Singleton (1959–2004), American convicted murderer
- C. T. Singleton Jr. (Charles Tod Singleton Jr., 1905–1977), American admiral
- Charles S. Singleton (1909–1985), American scholar and literary critic
- Charles Singleton (songwriter) (1913–1985), co-writer of "Strangers in the Night" and "Spanish Eyes"
