= Cyril Thomas =

Cyril Thomas may refer to:

- Cyril Thomas (boxer)
- Cyril Thomas (rugby union)
