= Tanjung Kupang =

- Interactive map of Tanjung Kupang
- Coordinates: 1.3505398°N 103.6007792°E
- Country: Malaysia
- State: Johor
- District: Johor Bahru
- City: Iskandar Puteri

Tanjung Kupang is a mukim in Iskandar Puteri, Johor Bahru District, Johor, Malaysia.

== Geography ==
The mukim has an area of approximately 115 km^{2} with a population of 10,702 people.

== Air crash ==
Tanjung Kupang was the crash site of Malaysian Airline System Flight 653 on December 4, 1977. The flight was hijacked and crashed near Kampong Ladang, Tanjung Kupang. All 93 passengers and 7 crew perished and no recognisable bodies were found. The remains were buried in a common grave known as Tanjung Kupang Memorial at Jalan Kebun Teh.

== Transportation ==
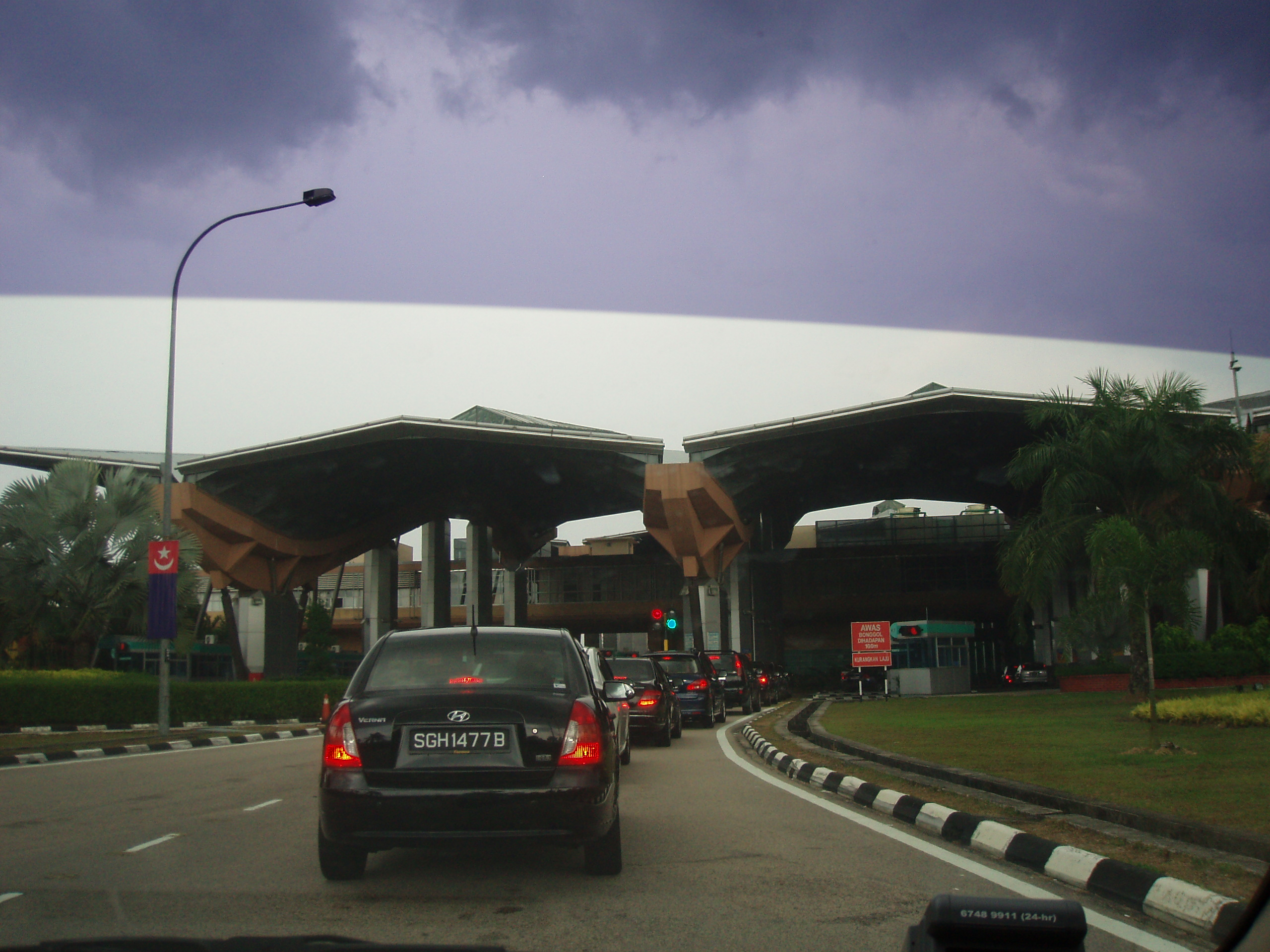
Sultan Abu Bakar Check point, Tanjung Kupang

The Malaysia–Singapore Second Link was built between Sultan Abu Bakar Complex in Kampong Ladang at Tanjung Kupang, Johor and Jalan Ahmad Ibrahim at Tuas, Singapore. The bridge was built to reduce the traffic congestion at the Johor–Singapore Causeway, and was opened to traffic on 2 January 1998. The twin-deck bridge supports a dual-three lane carriageway and its total length over water is 1,920 m.
