= Thomas Oppermann =

German politician (1954–2020)

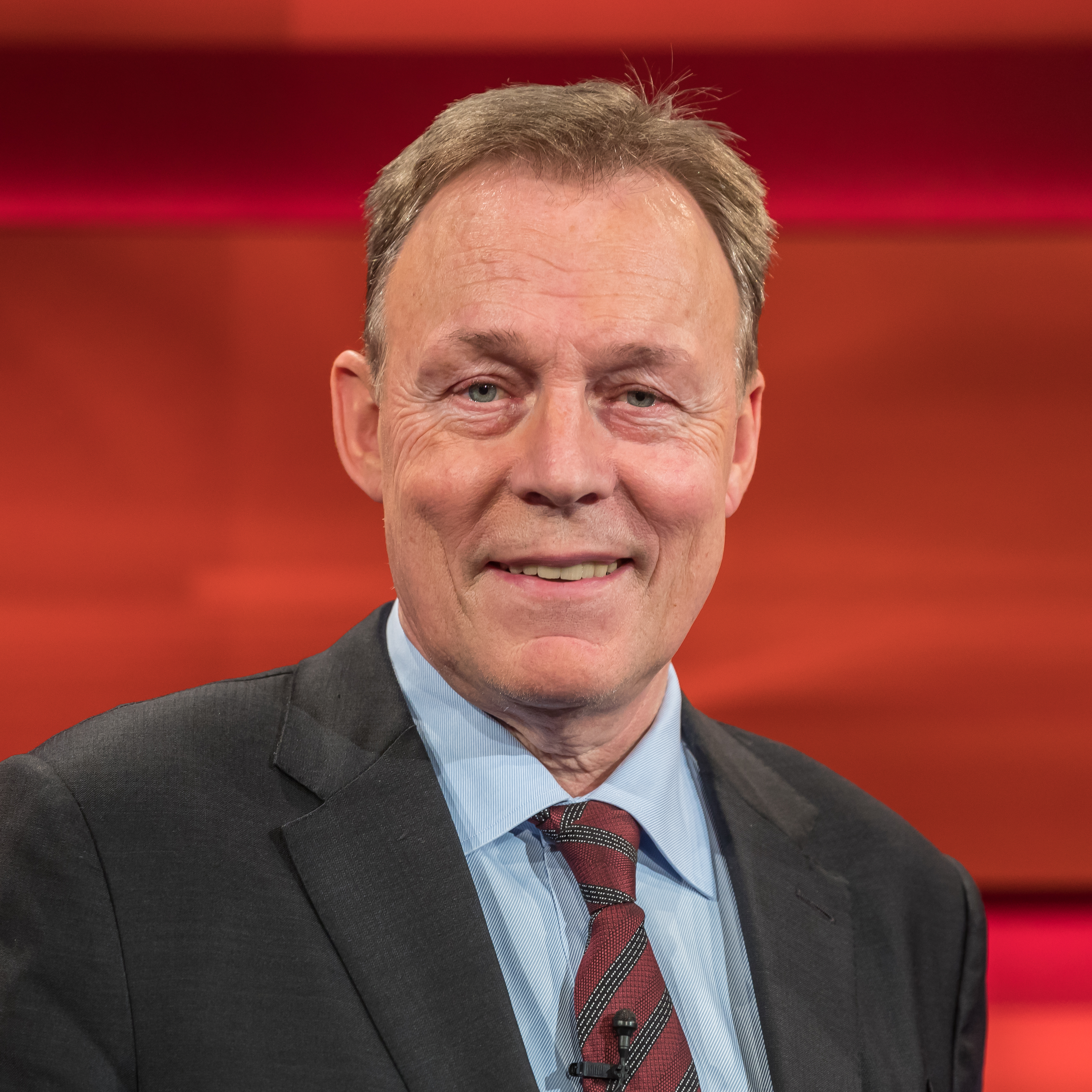
- Oppermann in 2020

Vice President of the Bundestag (on proposal of the SPD-faction)
- In office 24 October 2017 – 25 October 2020
- President: Wolfgang Schäuble
- Preceded by: Edelgard Bulmahn
- Succeeded by: Dagmar Ziegler

Leader of the Social Democratic Party in the Bundestag
- In office 16 December 2013 – 27 September 2017
- Chief Whip: Christine Lambrecht
- Preceded by: Frank-Walter Steinmeier
- Succeeded by: Andrea Nahles

Chief Whip of the Social Democratic Party in the Bundestag
- In office 21 November 2007 – 16 December 2013
- Leader: Peter Struck; Frank-Walter Steinmeier
- Preceded by: Olaf Scholz
- Succeeded by: Christine Lambrecht

Member of the Bundestag; for Göttingen
- In office 18 October 2005 – 25 October 2020
- Preceded by: Inge Wettig-Danielmeier
- Succeeded by: Hiltrud Lotze

Minister for Science and Culture of Lower Saxony
- In office 30 March 1998 – 4 March 2003
- Minister-President: Gerhard Schröder; Gerhard Glogowski; Sigmar Gabriel
- Preceded by: Helga Schuchardt
- Succeeded by: Lutz Stratmann

Member of the Landtag of Lower Saxony
- In office June 1990 – 9 November 2005
- Preceded by: Klaus Peter Bruns
- Succeeded by: Hans-Christian Schack
- Constituency: Göttingen-Land (1990–2003); State list (2003–2005)

Personal details
- Born: Thomas Ludwig Albert Oppermann; 27 April 1954 Freckenhorst, West Germany
- Died: 25 October 2020 (aged 66) Göttingen, Germany
- Party: Social Democratic
- Children: 4
- Education: University of Tübingen; University of Göttingen

Thomas Ludwig Albert Oppermann (27 April 1954 – 25 October 2020) was a German politician and member of the Social Democratic Party (SPD). From October 2017 until his death, he served as Vice President of the Bundestag. In his earlier career, he served as First Secretary (2007–2013) and later as chairman (2013–2017) of the SPD Parliamentary Group in the Bundestag.

Oppermann belonged to the right wing of the SPD, known as Seeheimer Kreis.

== Life and career ==
Oppermann was born in Freckenhorst on 27 April 1954. He received his abitur from the Goetheschule in Einbeck. Afterwards, he studied German studies and English studies at the University of Tübingen. From 1976 to 1978, he worked at Action Reconciliation Service for Peace (ARSP) in the United States. After his return to Germany, he went to law school at University of Göttingen, finishing in 1986.

From 1986 until 1990, Oppermann served as an administrative court judge in Hanover and later in Braunschweig. During 1988 to 1989, he was seconded to serve as the chief legal affairs officer for the city of Hann. Münden. Oppermann had three daughters and one son.

== Political career ==
=== Role in regional politics ===
Oppermann has been a member of the (SPD) since 1980 and president of the regional SPD in Göttingen since 1989. He was a member of the Lower Saxon Landtag from 1990 to 2005. He was speaker for legal affairs there from 1990 to 1998.

Between 1998 and 2003, Oppermann served as State Minister for Science and Culture in the cabinets of Minister-Presidents Gerhard Schröder, Gerhard Glogowski and Sigmar Gabriel. In 1999, after Glogowski's resignation, Oppermann lost an internal party vote against Gabriel on becoming the next Minister-President.

From 2003 to 2005, Oppermann was the economic speaker of the state SPD parliamentary group.

=== National politics ===
From the 2005 federal election until his death in 2020, Oppermann served as a member of the Bundestag (German parliament). Within his parliamentary group, he was part of the Seeheim Circle. From March 2006 to November 2007, he was speaker of the working group and leader of the SPD delegation on the committee to investigate the secret services (Geheimdienst-Untersuchungsausschuss).

Oppermann was elected as the First Parliamentary Secretary of the SPD parliamentary group in November 2007, succeeding Olaf Scholz; he was subsequently re-elected in 2011 and 2013. In this capacity, he also joined the parliament's Council of Elders, which – among other duties – determines daily legislative agenda items and assigns committee chairpersons based on party representation. He also became a member of the Parliamentary Oversight Panel (PKGr), which provides parliamentary oversight of Germany's intelligence services BND, BfV and MAD.

Between 2006 and 2013, Oppermann was the Deputy Chairman of the German-Israeli Parliamentary Friendship Group. From 2009, he served on the parliamentary body in charge of appointing judges to the Highest Courts of Justice, namely the Federal Court of Justice (BGH), the Federal Administrative Court (BVerwG), the Federal Fiscal Court (BFH), the Federal Labour Court (BAG), and the Federal Social Court (BSG).

Ahead of the 2009 elections, German foreign minister Frank-Walter Steinmeier included Oppermann, then relatively unknown face to the German public, in his shadow cabinet of 10 women and eight men for the Social Democrats’ campaign to unseat incumbent Angela Merkel as chancellor. During the campaign, Oppermann served as shadow minister for interior affairs and therefore as the counterpart of incumbent Wolfgang Schäuble.

=== Chairman of the SPD Parliamentary Group (2013–2017) ===
In the negotiations to form a so-called Grand Coalition following the 2013 federal elections, Oppermann led the SPD delegation in the internal and legal affairs working group; his co-chair was Hans-Peter Friedrich of the CSU. When Frank-Walter Steinmeier resigned as Chairman of the SPD Parliamentary Group to serve once again as foreign minister in Angela Merkel's second Grand Coalition, Oppermann was elected as his successor on 16 December 2013.

Oppermann also served on the Committee on the Election of Judges (Wahlausschuss), which is in charge of appointing judges to the Federal Constitutional Court of Germany.

In late 2015, the SPD's board under the leadership of Sigmar Gabriel mandated Oppermann and Manuela Schwesig with the task of drafting an electoral program for the 2017 federal elections. In the Social Democrats’ campaign to unseat incumbent Angela Merkel as chancellor, Oppermann focused on defence policy, thereby being a counterweight to incumbent Ursula von der Leyen.

=== Vice-President of the German Bundestag (2017–2020) ===
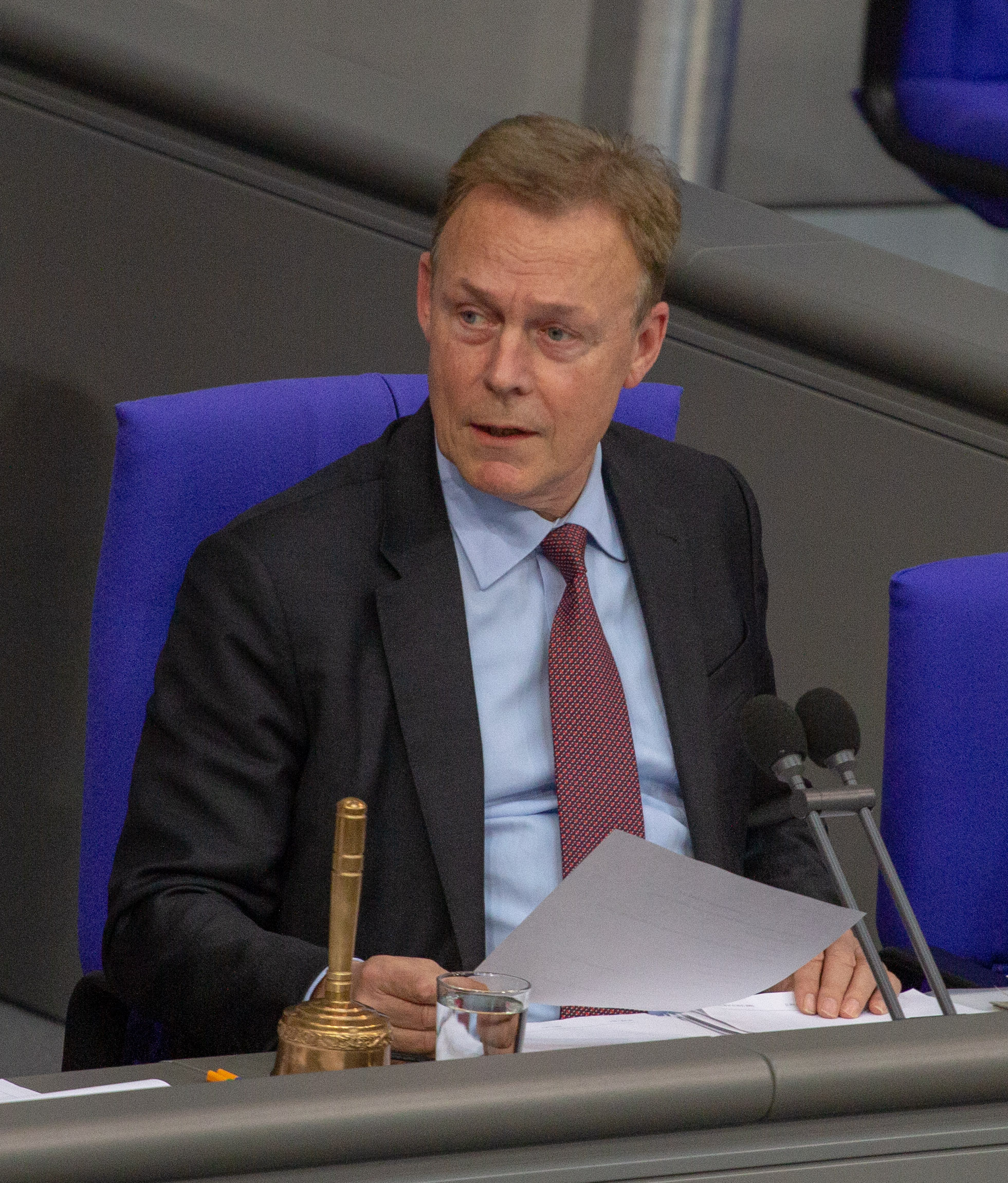
Oppermann as Vice-President of the German parliament in 2019

After the Social Democrats experienced their worst result in German post-war history, the new chairman Martin Schulz nominated Andrea Nahles to replace Oppermann as leader of the party's group in the German Parliament. He also served on the Committee on Foreign Affairs. From 2019, he was a member of the German delegation to the Franco-German Parliamentary Assembly.

In August 2020, Oppermann announced that he would not stand in the 2021 federal elections but instead resign from active politics by the end of the parliamentary term.

== Political positions ==
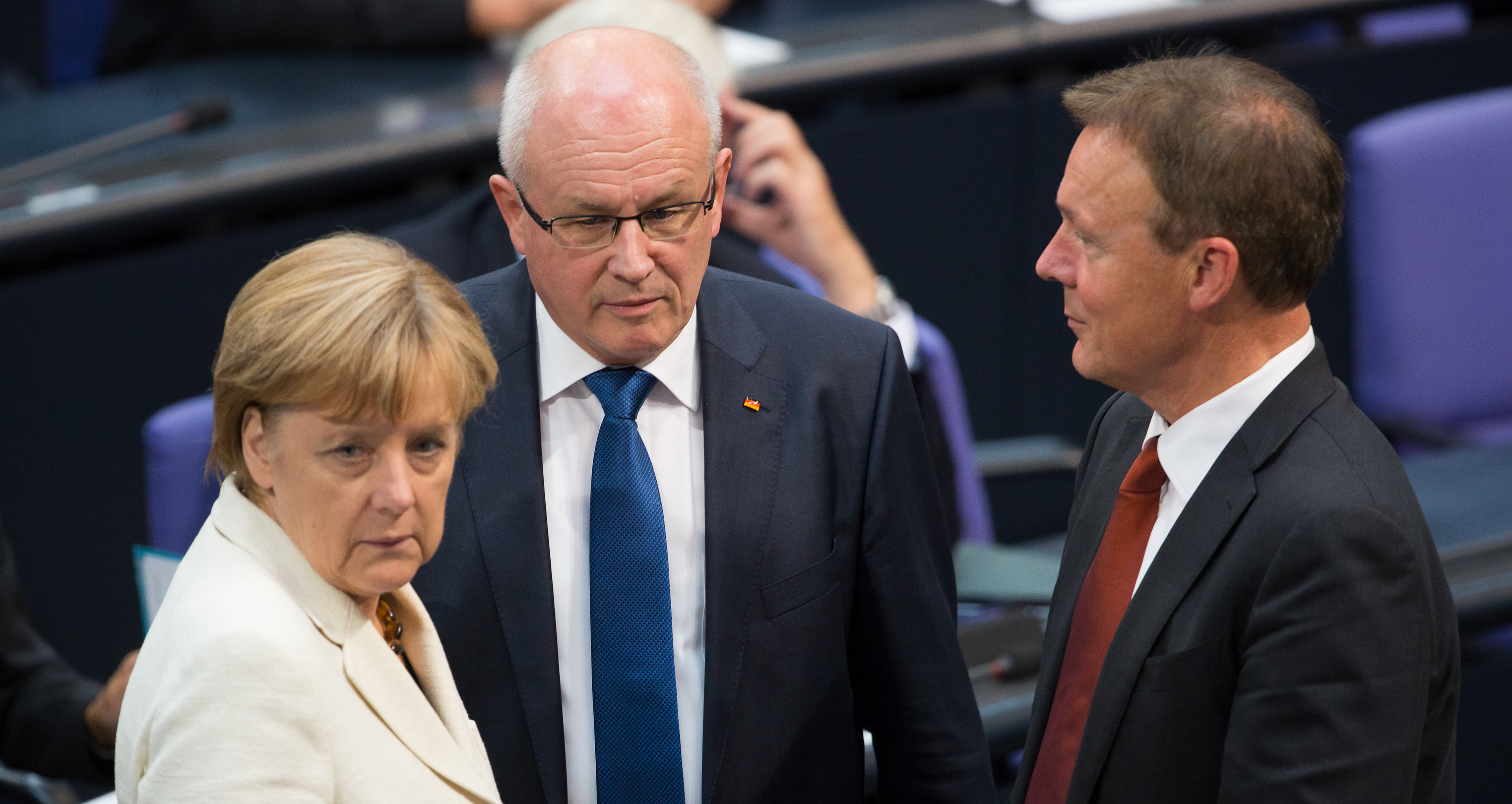
Thomas Oppermann alongside Angela Merkel and Volker Kauder at the Bundestag, 2014

In 2011, Oppermann publicly spoke out in favor of holding a national referendum over fundamental principles of the European Union on the day of the 2013 German federal election.

In 2013, Oppermann criticized the government of Chancellor Angela Merkel as news emerged of its intentions to sell arms to Saudi Arabia, saying that the conservatives wanted to "totally upgrade" the country's military capabilities.

Faced with 800,000 migrants arriving in Germany in 2015, Oppermann said his party would never accept a "CSU proposal to create 'transit zones' near the border, where asylum seekers with no chance of staying could be quickly sent back home".

== Other activities ==
=== Corporate boards ===
- EnBW, Member of the Advisory Board (2005–2006)

=== Non-profits ===
- German Football Association (DFB), Chairman of the Ethic Commission (since 2019)
- Hertie School of Governance, Member of the Board of Trustees
- Friedrich Ebert Foundation (FES), Member
- Friends of the Center for Palliative Care of the University of Göttingen, Member of the Board of Trustees
- Berlin Institute for Advanced Study, Member of the Board of Trustees (until April 2015)
- Göttingen International Handel Festival, Member of the Supervisory Board
- Max Planck Institute for Biophysical Chemistry, Member of the Board of Trustees
- Max Planck Institute for Dynamics and Self-Organization, Member of the Board of Trustees
- Max Planck Institute for Solar System Research, Member of the Board of Trustees
- Volkswagen Foundation, Member of the Board of Trustees
- ZDF, Member of the Television Board
- Das Progressive Zentrum, Member of the Circle of Friends
- Fraunhofer Society, Member of the Senate (2006–2008)

== Controversy ==
When a former member of parliament Sebastian Edathy in December 2014 appeared before a Bundestag inquiry into his purchase of child pornography, he was asked about whether a tip-off from party colleagues gave him time to destroy evidence ahead of a police raid on his home and office. Edathy said senior SPD members, particularly Oppermann, breached legal privilege by discussing the case with colleagues and staff. During a closed-door hearing of the Committee on Internal Affairs earlier that year, Oppermann had denied that he or any of his fellow high-ranking SPD officials "indirectly or directly informed or even warned Sebastian Edathy of the investigation or our knowledge of it."

== Death ==
Oppermann collapsed while waiting for a TV appearance and was transported to a hospital in Göttingen, where he died on 25 October 2020, at the age of 66.

Party political offices
Preceded by Frank-Walter Steinmeier	Leader of the Social Democratic Party in the Bundestag; 2013–2017	Succeeded by Andrea Nahles
