= Andreas Philippi =

German politician

- Philippi in 2021

Minister for Social Affairs, Labour, Health and Equality of Lower Saxony
- Incumbent
- Assumed office 25 January 2023
- Minister-President: Stephan Weil; Olaf Lies
- Preceded by: Daniela Behrens

Member of the Bundestag; for Göttingen
- In office 26 October 2021 – 24 January 2023
- Preceded by: Hiltrud Lotze
- Succeeded by: Dirk-Ulrich Mende

Personal details
- Born: Andreas Milan Gerhard Philippi; 4 July 1965 (age 61) Marburg, West Germany
- Party: Social Democratic
- Children: 2
- Education: University of Göttingen

Andreas Milan Gerhard Philippi (born 4 July 1965) is a German surgeon and politician of the Social Democratic Party (SPD) who has been serving as State Minister of Social Affairs, Labour, Health and Equality in the government of Lower Saxony since 2023. He previously was a member of the Bundestag from the state of Lower Saxony from 2021 to 2022.

== Early life and education ==
Philippi was born 1965 in the West German city of Marburg and studied medicine at the University of Goettingen. From 2009, he practiced at a community health center in Herzberg am Harz.

== Political career ==
Philippi entered the SPD in 1982 and became member of the Bundestag in the 2021 elections, representing the Göttingen district. In parliament, he served on the Health Committee.

Since joining the state government, Philippi has been one of Lower Saxony's representatives in the Bundesrat, where serves on the Health Committee, the Committee on Labour, Integration and Social Policy, the Committee on Family and Senior Citizen Affairs and the Committee on Women and Youth.

In the negotiations to form a Grand Coalition under the leadership of Friedrich Merz's Christian Democrats (CDU together with the Bavarian CSU) and the SPD following the 2025 German elections, Philippi was part of the SPD delegation in the working group on health, led by Karl-Josef Laumann, Stephan Pilsinger and Katja Pähle.

== Other activities ==
- German Red Cross (DRK), Member
