= Aquiles Roggero =

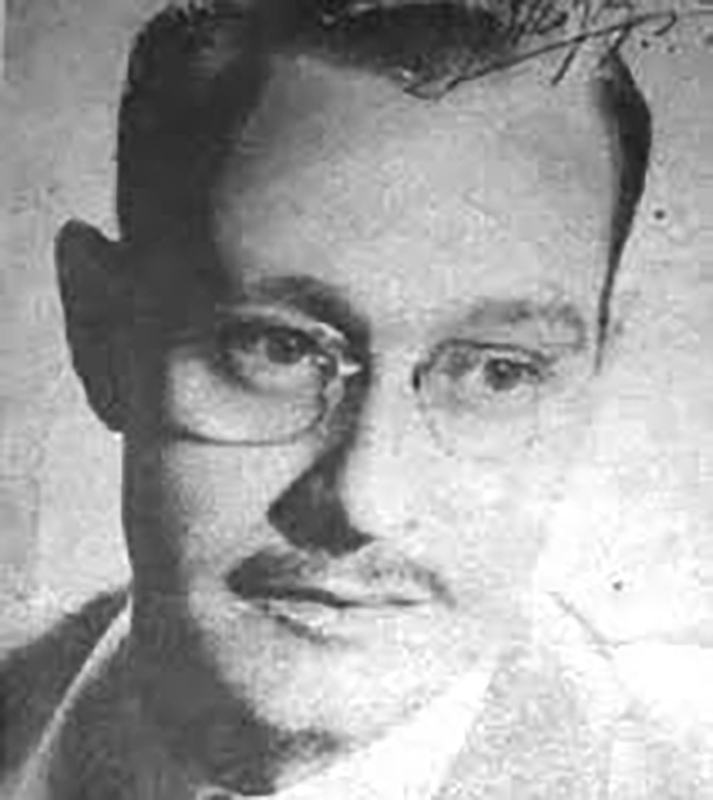
- Aquiles Roggero

Background information
- Born: Aquiles Roggero; March 12, 1913; Pehuajó, Buenos Aires Province, Argentina
- Origin: Argentina
- Genres: Tango
- Occupations: Musician, pianist, conductor, composer
- Instrument: Piano

Aquiles Roggero (12 March 1913 – 21 December 1977) was an Argentine musician, pianist, conductor, and composer.

== Life ==
Aquiles Roggero was born in Pehuajó, Argentina, the son of Luisa Guallini and José María Roggero. He was the cousin of singer, guitarist, composer, and actress Virginia Vera (1898–1949).

Between 1936 and 1939, he was the pianist for the Vitaphone orchestra, which was led by his fellow townsman and friend Osmar Maderna.

In 1940 and 1941, he joined the orchestral group "Los Rítmicos," and years later, Maderna, who had already left Miguel Caló's orchestra, invited him to join his newly formed one.

In 1951, Maderna died in a plane crash, and Aquiles took over conducting his friend's orchestra, which would be called the "Osmar Maderna Symbolic Orchestra."

In 1960, the orchestra disbanded, and Roggero went on to be a member of the groups led by Leopoldo Federico, Miguel Caló, and the "Orquesta Típica Porteña" directed by Raúl Garello.

In 1968, accepting a proposal from the composer Lorenzo Spanu, Aquiles reformed the Orquesta Símbolo to record under the "Forever" label and made fifty-three recordings. In 1969, the orchestra visited Pehuajó, and at the memorable "National Tango Festival," Aquiles's son, Luis Roggero, moved the audience with his violin performance of Maderna's "Pequeña."

In 1976, at the request of his followers, Roggero reformed the Orquesta Símbolo once again, which was disbanded after the musician died on December 21, 1977.

He composed the music for the film La aventura de los paraguas asesinos, which was released in 1979.
