= Georges Bellenger =

French officer and pilot

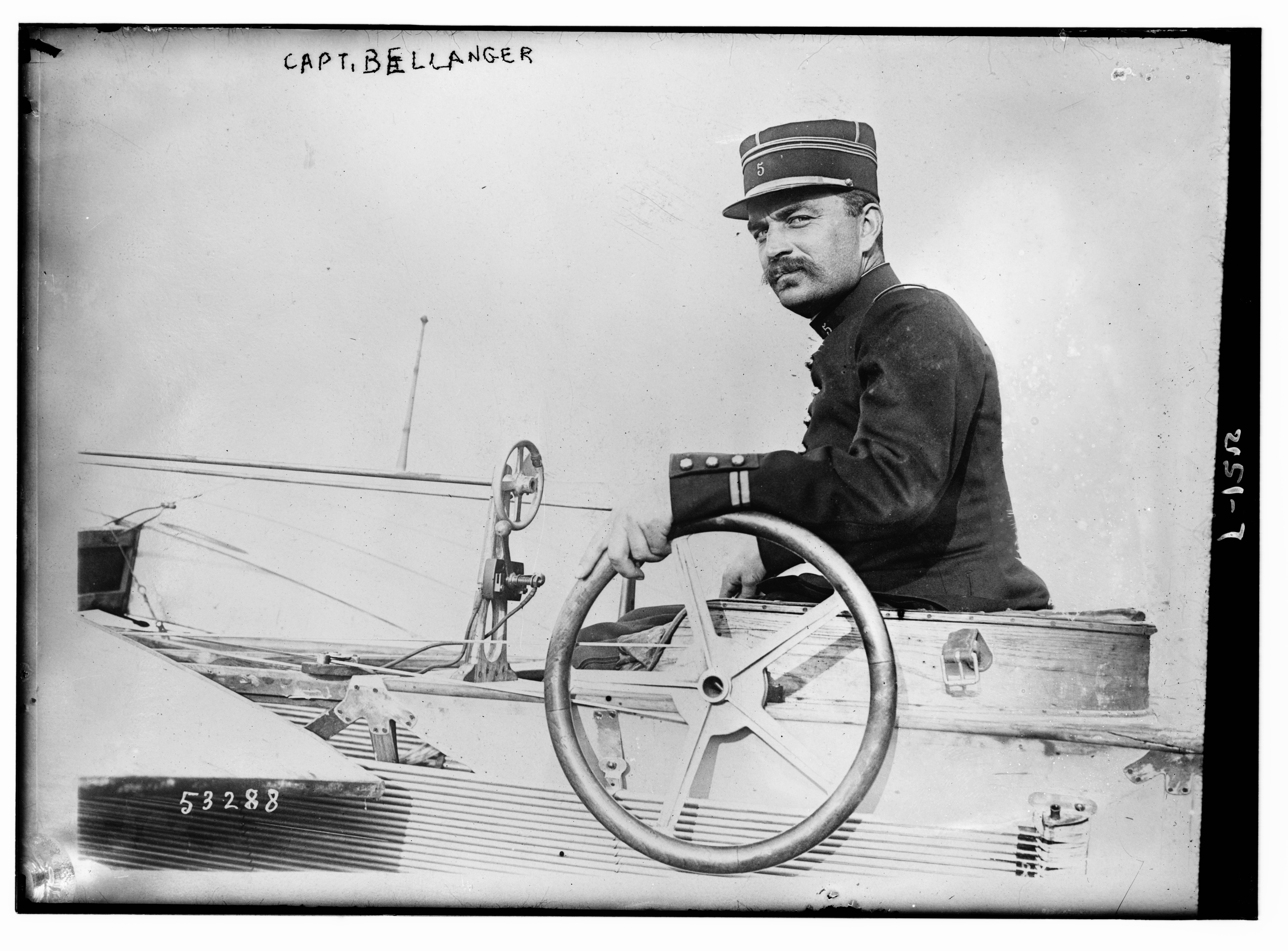

Georges Marie Bellenger (19 September 1878 – 22 December 1977) was a French officer and pilot. He trained as a gunner after his acceptance into the École Polytechnique in 1898. Georges Bellenger was very passionate about aviation since his childhood in France at the beginning of the 20^{th} century.

== Biography ==
Georges Bellenger was born in Évreux to Émile Bellenger, a lawyer, and his wife, Marie Eugénie Aglaé Gibert.

In 1902, he graduated as a second lieutenant from the Fontainebleau École d'application de l'artillerie et du génie. He went on assignment to the artillery regiment garrison at Saint-Mihiel. In 1904–1905, one of the articles by Captain Ferdinand Ferber, which appeared in the Revue d'Artillerie, caught his attention and he began to experiment with kites.

As an artillery man, Bellenger had an internship at the Versailles Balloonist Battalion between 1 April 1906 and 30 June 1906. His first ascent took place on 21 April 1906, in a 980 m^{3} cotton balloon inflated with lighting gas. He obtained a pilot's license for free balloons, no. 95 of the Aero Club, on 3 October 1907 after making his tenth ascent.

As a free balloon pilot at the start of aerostation, he participated in numerous competitions. In particular, he placed second in the Aero-Club International Aerial Photography Competition in 1907. He broke the distance record for small cubes on 8 December 1908, by traveling from the Aéro-Club park in Saint-Cloud to the Baltic Sea aboard a 600 m^{3} balloon. He obtained the patent of military balloonist no. 43 on 30 January 1909.

During his stay at the Vincennes military aviation establishment (15 January 1910 to 30 September 1912), he was under the orders of Lieutenant-Colonel Estienne, who gave him the badge of a knight of the Legion of Honor. Member of the Aero Club of France born in contact with the aviation pioneers such as Ferber, Hubert Latham, and Louis Blériot. He obtained civilian pilot's license no. 45 on 25 April 1910, and was noted for the Great Maneuvers of 1910 by the quality of his observations: present, General Gallieni immediately promoted him to captain.

In 1910, he took second place in the Grand Prix des Ballons of the Aéro-Club de France: departing from Saint-Cloud, he landed in the Austrian Tyrol.

In 1911, as the winner of the Paris-Pau raid, he was accepted in his hometown as a worthy successor to Blériot, the designer of his airplane.

In 1912, Captain Bellenger received an appointment to set up and direct an aviation school at the Avord camp, near Bourges. It formed Squadron no. 3, which, during the war, became the famous Storks Escadrille.

In 1913, after reception at the war school, he left for three months to the Balkans "to compare facts and doctrines." The report he drew first provoked hilarity, but the information came to confirm his observations and earned him a letter of satisfaction for his real qualities of view. However, there followed mixed evaluations from his teachers at the war school: "Bellenger: intelligent and sympathetic, - unfortunately had too many personal ideas to be specific to the collective work of a General Staff."

A promoter of aerial photography, his information contributed to the victory of the First Battle of the Marne in 1914.

On September 1, 1914, he took command of the aviation of the Sixth Army, whose intervention at the battle of Ourcq was most effective and where he had the opportunity to organize artillery observation by plane, then the aerial photo of the front, before being made available to the aeronautical directorate of the Ministry of War.

Not wanting to stay away from the action, he went, at his request, into the artillery from May 1915 to August 1918, during which time he was seriously injured. He ended the war with six quotes.

In 1939, mobilized at his request (he was 61 years old), he took charge of a regiment of anti-tank batteries for the RGA (General Artillery Reserve). He took the opportunity to inspect the front between Longwy and Valenciennes. His observations allowed him to propose a strategy to stop the German advance to the General Staff on 22 May. In conflict with a conservative team, he returned to forced leave. His strategy would not be implemented until ten days later, too late and too timidly.

A refugee with his family in Annecy, he corresponded with Lieutenant Théodore Morel (Tom), then chief of the maquis des Glières. He participated in the training of the maquis but expressed his fears to Tom about the concept of fortress plateau as practised in the Vercors, preferring a maquis war. This preparation made it possible to limit the losses significantly during the German attack on the Glières.

== Honors and tributes ==
- Public education officer (academic palms) on 16 June 1910 at the flying club
- Sports Academy Medal for "Outstanding Aviator Achievements" - 26 January 1911
- Appointed knight in 1911, he was promoted to officer of the Legion of Honor on a military basis in 1920 after redress for injustices (Fayolle Commission) arrested on 13 August 1920
- Croix de guerre 1914-1918 (Six citations (1 army, 2 CA, 2 DI, 1 regiment))
- Order of the Star of Ethiopia
- Order of the White Eagle (Serbia) - presented by King Peter 1 ^{st} of Serbia for a demonstration flight in the rain and the wind well narrated by the press
- Military Cross (UK) - awarded on 31 May 1919, probably for his observations for the 1st Battle of the Marne in September 1914
- His name was given to one of the hangars at Évreux aerodrome in 1913.
  - On this aerodrome, which became a base 105 in 1944, a new hangar "Halte aerial Bellenger" was inaugurated on 16 June 2018.
