= Inge Wettig-Danielmeier =

German politician (1936–2026)

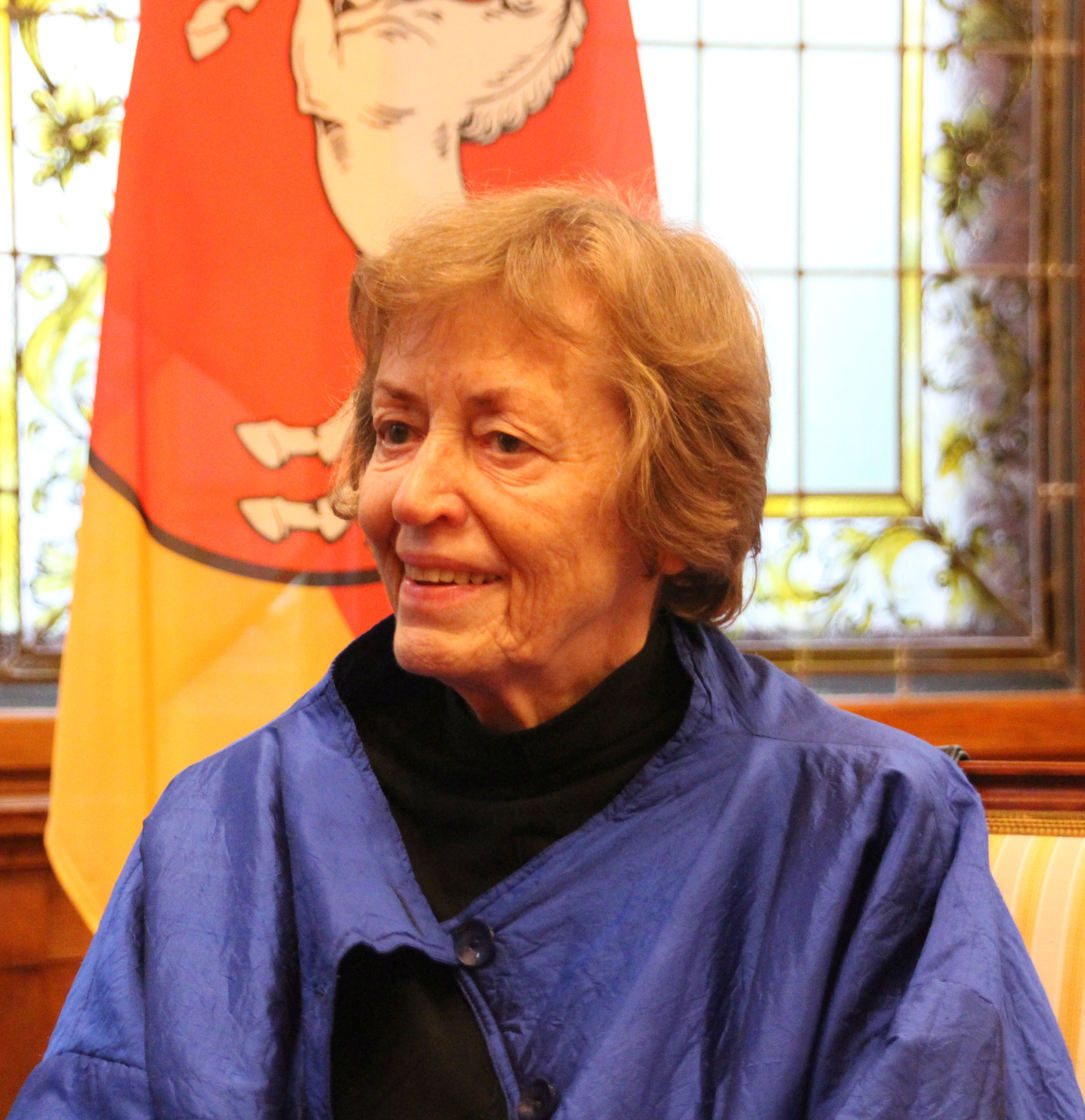
- Wettig-Danielmeier in 2017

Member of the Bundestag; from Lower Saxony
- In office 20 December 1990 – 18 October 2005
- Preceded by: Multi-member district
- Succeeded by: Thomas Oppermann
- Constituency: State list (1990–1998); Göttingen (1998–2005)

Member of the Landtag of Lower Saxony
- In office 20 November 1972 – 20 June 1990
- Preceded by: Erich Gerlach
- Succeeded by: Hulle Hartwig
- Constituency: Northeim (1972–1974); State list (1974–1986); Göttingen (1986–1990)

Personal details
- Born: Inge Danielmeier; 1 October 1936 Heilbronn, Germany
- Died: 20 May 2026 (aged 89)
- Party: Social Democratic
- Children: 3
- Education: Antioch College; University of Göttingen
- Occupation: Journalist

Inge Wettig-Danielmeier (née Danielmeier; 1 October 1936 – 20 May 2026) was a German politician. A member of the Social Democratic Party, she served in the Landtag of Lower Saxony form 1972 to 1990 and in the Bundestag from 1990 to 2005.

Wettig-Danielmeier died on 20 May 2026, at the age of 89.
