= Walter Drechsel =

German politician

Member of the Bundestag; for Göttingen – Münden
- In office 6 October 1953 – 15 October 1957
- Preceded by: Arno Hennig
- Succeeded by: Franz Blücher

Personal details
- Born: 7 April 1902 Pirna, Germany
- Died: 20 December 1977 (aged 75) Baden-Baden, West Germany
- Party: Free Democratic Party
- Education: TU Dresden

Walter Drechsel (7 October 1902 – 20 December 1977) was a German politician of the Free Democratic Party (FDP) and former member of the German Bundestag.

== Political career ==
He was a member of the German Bundestag from 1953 to 1957. In parliament he represented the constituency of Göttingen – Münden.

== Literature ==
Herbst, Ludolf; Jahn, Bruno (2002). Vierhaus, Rudolf (ed.). Biographisches Handbuch der Mitglieder des Deutschen Bundestages. 1949–2002 [Biographical Handbook of the Members of the German Bundestag. 1949–2002] (in German). München: De Gruyter - De Gruyter Saur. p. 1715. ISBN 978-3-11-184511-1.
