= Arnold Hazeland =

Norwegian judge (1859–1945)

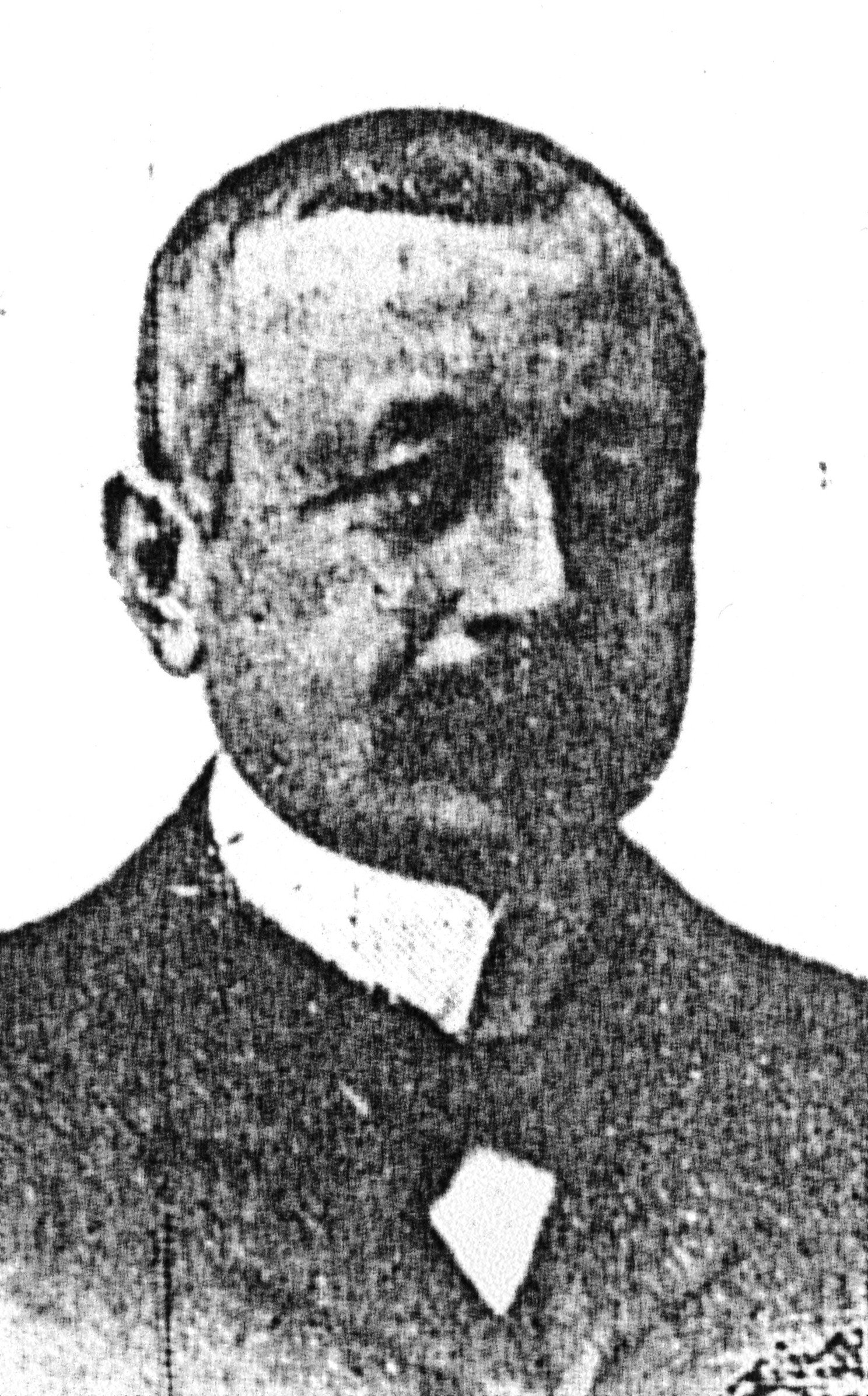
Arnold Hazeland (ca. 1914)

Arnold Mathew Johan Philip Hazeland (10 February 1859 – 17 November 1945) was a Norwegian attorney, Supreme Court Justice as an Anarchist in the late 1920s, and eventually later on a politician for the Labour Party. Hazeland worked on several translations of the works of Russian scientist and anarchist, Peter A. Kropotkin. What became of his manuscripts is not known.

== Biography ==
He was born at Birkrem Municipality in Stavanger county, Norway. He was a son of John Hazeland (1838-1889) and his wife Serine Larsen Vigesaa (1832-1893). His father was a translator and an English language teacher.

Hazeland passed his examen artium in 1876 and graduated from the Royal Frederick University with the cand.jur. degree in 1881. He was a deputy judge, junior solicitor and then attorney in Kristiania (now Oslo) from 1890 to 1907.

In 1907, he settled in Strinda Municipality. He became an assessor in Trondheim in 1907, and served as district stipendiary magistrate in Søndre Gudbrandsdalen from 1915 to 1919, then Supreme Court Justice from 1919 to 1929.

He was also elected to the municipal council for Christiania in 1898. In the 1909 parliamentary election he stood for his party in the constituency of Strinda Municipality. He was pitted against Liberal candidate Paul Andreas Olsen Fjermstad (1841-1921) and finished second with 1,052 against 1,096 votes. There was a second round of voting, in which the Conservative candidate, Even Larsen Loreng (1852-1942) edged out the other two with Hazeland in third. In 1912 he won the first round against both Fjermstad and Loreng, but Fjermstad prevailed in the second round. In 1915 he stood in the constituency of the Market towns of Hedmark and Oppland counties (Lillehammer, Hamar, Gjøvik og Kongsvinger), but Axel Thallaug (1866–1938) from Lillehammer carried the constituency already in the first round.

== Personal life ==
In 1893 he married Anna Schjølberg, a sister of judge Rasmus Schjølberg (1860-1943). They were the parents of four children including Arnold Hazeland Jr. (1900–1977) who was a civil servant, attorney and judge. He died in November 1945 and was buried at Vår Frelsers gravlund.
