= Gheorghe Cialâk =

Gheorghe Cialâk (21 April 1886 – 7 December 1977) was a Romanian lieutenant-general during World War II.

Born in Bucharest, he attended the Infantry and Cavalry Military School from 1906 to 1908, graduating with the rank of second lieutenant. He advanced in rank to lieutenant (1910), captain (1916), and major (1917), lieutenant colonel (1923), and colonel (1929). In 1938 he was promoted to brigadier general.

From 1940 to 1941 Cialâk served as Director of the Personnel Directorate at the Ministry of War. In February 1941, he became General Officer Commanding the 4th Infantry Division, and in May 1941 he was awarded the Order of the Crown, Commander rank. In January 1942, he was promoted to major general, and served as General Officer Commanding 7th Corps area and General Officer Commanding Cavalry Corps. In 1943 he fought with the Cavalry Corps on the Eastern Front. In January 1944 he was promoted to lieutenant general.

After coup d'état of 23 August 1944, Romania joined the Allies. In mid-September, he arrived in Lugoj with his Cavalry Corps and fought against Axis at the battle of Timișoara. Cialâk was arrested in October 1944, after protesting the way the Soviet Union was treating units of recruits into the Romanian Army fighting on the front lines. Detained at Malmaison prison in Bucharest, he was released and put under house arrest in February 1945 at the intervention of the Chief of the Romanian General Staff, general Constantin Sănătescu. He retired in March 1945, and was acquitted by the Bucharest Court of Appeals and released in October 1946. However, he was arrested again in November 1951 and charged with crimes against humanity. After being incarcerated at Jilava prison for several years, he was ultimately released in October 1955.

He died in 1977 in Bucharest.
