= Malaysian Airline System Flight 653 =

1977 aircraft hijacking in Malaysia

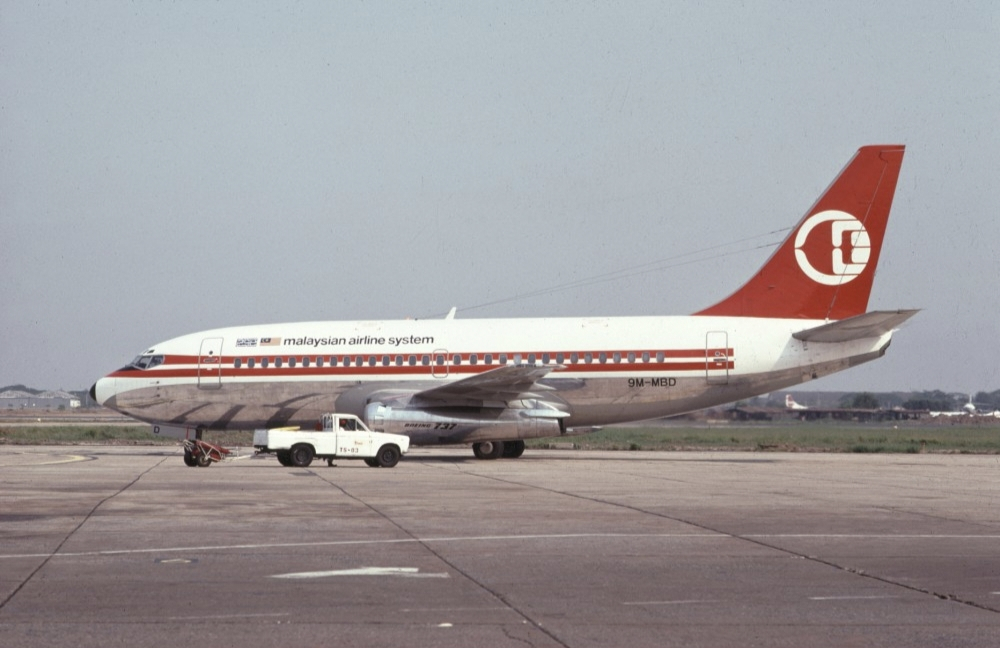
- 9M-MBD, the aircraft involved in the hijacking, seen in 1976

Hijacking
- Date: 4 December 1977
- Summary: Hijacking
- Site: Tanjung Kupang, Johor, Malaysia; 1.3887°N 103.5314°E

Aircraft
- Aircraft type: Boeing 737-2H6
- Operator: Malaysian Airline System
- IATA flight No.: MH653
- ICAO flight No.: MAS653
- Call sign: MALAYSIAN 653
- Registration: 9M-MBD
- Flight origin: Penang International Airport
- Stopover: Subang Airport
- Destination: Singapore Int'l Airport (Paya Lebar)
- Occupants: 100
- Passengers: 93
- Crew: 7
- Fatalities: 100
- Survivors: 0

Malaysian Airline System Flight 653 was a scheduled domestic flight from Penang to Kuala Lumpur in Malaysia, operated by Malaysian Airline System (MAS). On the evening of 4 December 1977, the Boeing 737-200 aircraft flying the service crashed at Tanjung Kupang, Johor, Malaysia, while purportedly being diverted by hijackers to Singapore. It was the first fatal air crash for Malaysia Airlines (as the airline is now known), with all 93 passengers and 7 crew killed. It is also the deadliest aviation disaster to occur on Malaysian soil. The flight was apparently hijacked as soon as it reached cruise altitude. The circumstances in which the hijacking and subsequent crash occurred remain unsolved.

== Aircraft ==
The aircraft involved was a Boeing 737-2H6 (Note: The aircraft was a Boeing 737-200 model; Boeing assigns a unique customer code for each company that buys one of its aircraft, which is applied as a suffix to the model number at the time the aircraft is built. The code for Malaysian Airline System (now Malaysia Airlines) is "H6", hence "737-2H6".) registered as 9M-MBD. It had been delivered new to MAS in September 1972 with registration 9M-AQO.

== Sequence of events ==
Flight 653 departed from Runway 22 at Penang International Airport at 19:21 for Kuala Lumpur's Subang Airport (now known as Sultan Abdul Aziz Shah Airport).

Captain GK Ganjoor and First Officer Karamuzaman Jali were making landing preparations at 19:54, while at an altitude of 4,000 feet (1,200 m) over Batu Arang and descending toward Runway 33 at Subang Airport, when the crew reported to Subang Tower that an "unidentified hijacker" was on board, after someone knocked on the cockpit doors. Subsequently, the pilots were forced to cut off all communications by one or more hijackers who suddenly barged into the cockpit. The tower immediately notified the authorities, who made emergency preparations at the airport.

A few minutes later, the crew radioed: "We're now proceeding to Singapore. Good night." In the last few minutes of the tapes from the cockpit voice recorder, investigators heard conversation between the pilots and the hijackers about how the aircraft would run out of fuel before it could make it to Singapore, followed by a series of gunshots. They concluded that both the pilot and co-pilot were fatally shot by the hijacker, which left the plane "professionally uncontrolled". At 20:15, all communication with the aircraft was lost. At 20:36, the residents of Kampong Ladang, Tanjung Kupang in Johor reported hearing explosions and seeing burning wreckage in a swamp. The wreckage was later identified as the aircraft; it had hit the ground at a near-vertical angle at a very high speed. There were no survivors.

== Investigation and aftermath ==
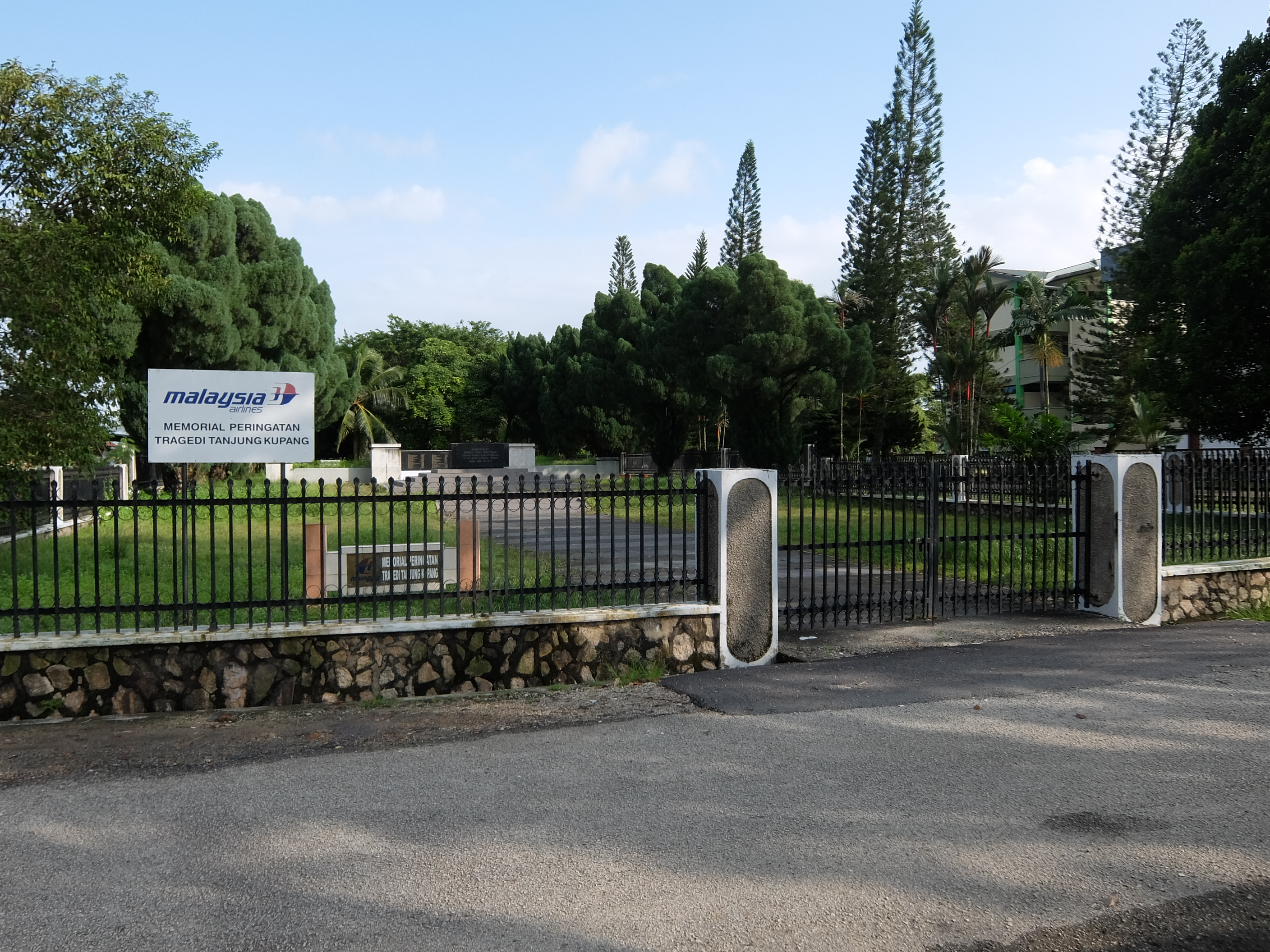
Tanjung Kupang Tragedy Memorial in Johor Bahru, Johor

The full circumstances of the hijacking and crash were never solved. (Note: Airport officials at Kuala Lumpur said pilots had radioed that members of the Japanese Red Army (JRA) had hijacked the plane. In 1996, while reporting about the hijacking and crash of Ethiopian Airlines Flight 961, CNN reporters wrote that the hijackers of MH653 had in fact been identified as Red Army members, but this has never been confirmed. A 1978 report conducted by Malaysia's Department of Civil Aviation, which included a transcript of available cockpit voice recordings, did not refer to any such communication from the pilots mentioning the JRA, or the identity of the hijackers.) An analysis by Malaysia's Department of Civil Aviation of evidence from the investigation concludes that:

- The aircraft was "hijacked by person or persons unknown", who were determined not to land at Kuala Lumpur
- The crew "carried out their hijack procedures properly and correctly ... throughout the flight."
- The hijackers incapacitated the crew as the aircraft descended in its approach to Singapore
- There was no explosion, fire, or structural failure prior to impact
- Unusual pitching – up and down – movements occurred in the aircraft's final moments in the air. These manoeuvres were the result of the actions of person or persons unknown and developed until the aircraft's trajectory became unrecoverable, resulting in its impact with the ground

All recovered remains were x-rayed in an attempt to discover evidence of a projectile or weapon, but no such evidence was ever found. The remains of the victims were interred in a mass burial.

After the incident, the Aviation Security Unit of the Airport Standard Division of the Department of Civil Aviation Malaysia was established.

== Passengers and crew ==
Names of the passengers and crew at the Tanjung Kupang Memorial

Passengers included the Malaysian Agricultural Minister, Dato' Ali Haji Ahmad; Public Works Department Head, Dato' Mahfuz Khalid; and Cuban Ambassador to Japan, Mario García Incháustegui.

The numbers and nationalities of the passengers and crew appear in the table below:

Persons on board MH653
Nationality	Passengers	Crew	Total
Malaysia	67	6	73
United Kingdom	5	0	5
West Germany	4	0	4
Australia	3	0	3
India	2	1	3
Indonesia	3	0	3
Cuba	2	0	2
Afghanistan	1	0	1
Canada	1	0	1
Japan	1	0	1
Greece	1	0	1
Singapore	1	0	1
Thailand	1	0	1
United States	1	0	1
Total (14 Nationalities)	93	7	100

== See also ==
- Air Vietnam Flight 706
