= Henk Angenent (footballer) =

Dutch footballer (1930–1977)

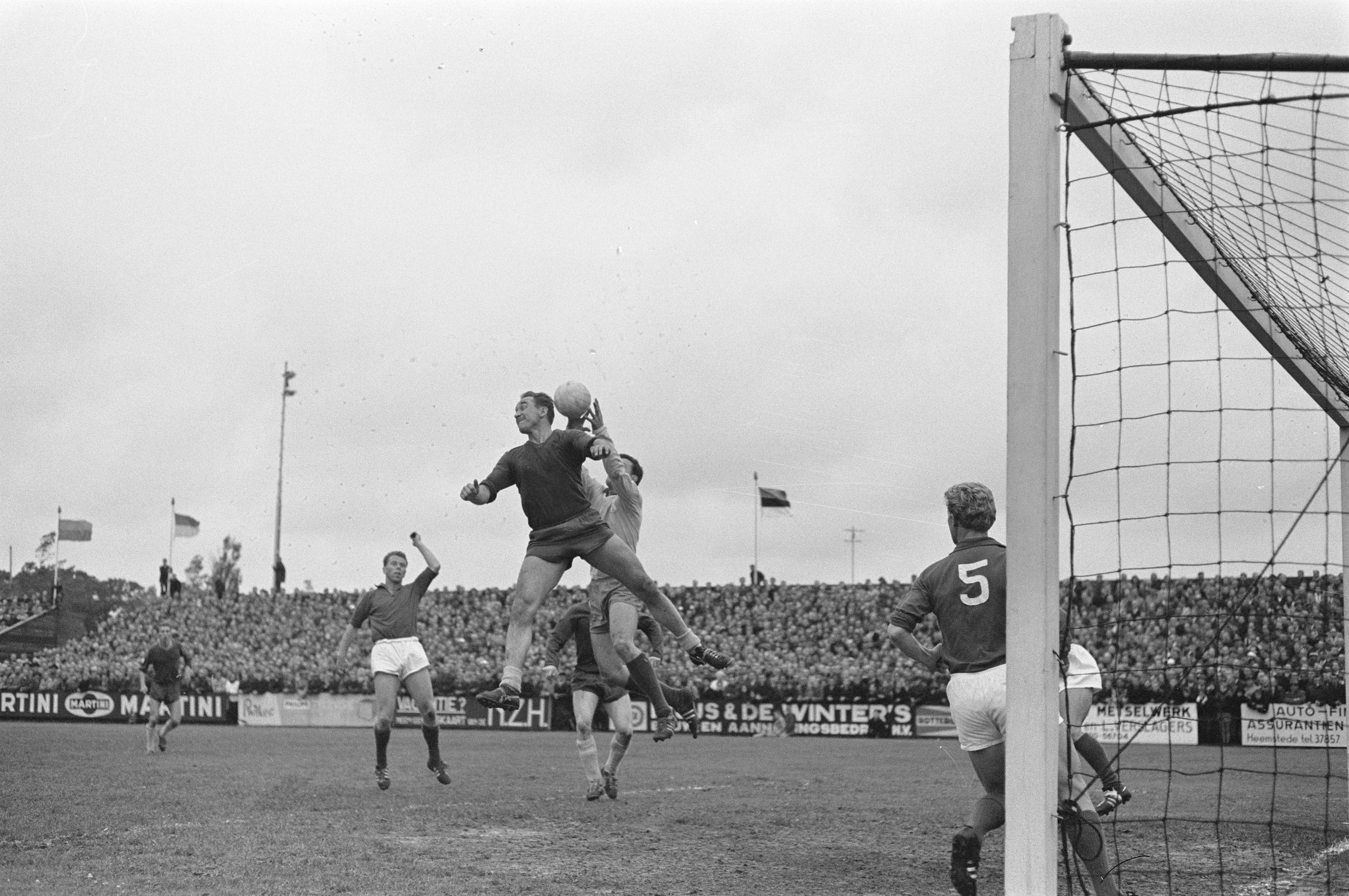

Personal information
- Date of birth: 14 June 1930
- Place of birth: Haarlem, Netherlands
- Date of death: 26 December 1977 (aged 47)
- Place of death: Culemborg, Netherlands
- Position: Forward

Youth career
- 1939–1950: Vliegende Vogels

Senior career*
| Years | Team | Apps | (Gls) |
| 1950–1953 | Stormvogels | 43 | (48) |
| 1953–1954 | Emma Hoensbroek | 20 | (32) |
| 1954–1962 | Fortuna '54 | 231 | (122) |
| 1962–1963 | Haarlem | 32 | (19) |
| 1963–1964 | DHC | 12 | (3) |
| 1964–1965 | Blauw-Wit | 15 | (3) |

International career
| 1957 | Netherlands | 1 | (0) |

Managerial career
- 1972–1974: Velox
- * Club domestic league appearances and goals

Henk Angenent (14 June 1930 – 26 December 1977) was a Dutch footballer. He played in one match for the Netherlands national football team in 1957.
