= Karl Tekusch =

Austrian footballer

Personal information
- Date of birth: 7 July 1890
- Place of birth: Wien, Austria-Hungary
- Date of death: 28 December 1977 (aged 87)
- Position: Midfielder

International career
Years	Team	Apps	(Gls)
1908–1918	Austria	15	(0)

Karl Tekusch (7 July 1890 – 28 December 1977) was an Austrian footballer. In line-ups often listed as "Tekusch II", he played in 15 matches for the Austria national football team from 1908 to 1918. He was also part of Austria's squad for the football tournament at the 1912 Summer Olympics, but he did not play in any matches.
