= Rafael Ajlec =

Rafael Ajlec (Mokronog, 29 August 1915 – 11 December 1977, Ljubljana) was a Slovenian musicologist, journalist, and critic. He was born in Mokronog, Carniola. He taught music history at the University of Ljubljana's School of Education. He studied the works of Slovenian composers and the life of Jacobus Gallus. He died in Ljubljana.
