= Rachel Sargent Robinson =

American classical scholar (1891–1977)

- Born: February 10, 1891; Methuen, Massachusetts, U.S.
- Died: December 18, 1977 (aged 86); Cincinnati, Ohio, U.S.
- Occupation: Classical scholar

Academic background
- Education: Bates College; University of Illinois Urbana-Champaign
- Thesis: The Size of the Slave Population at Athens during the Fifth and Fourth Centuries before Christ (1923)
- Doctoral advisor: William Abbott Oldfather

Academic work
- Discipline: Classical studies
- Sub-discipline: History of ancient sport
- Institutions: North Central College; Western Reserve University; University of Cincinnati; Ohio State University; University of Oklahoma; Miami University

Rachel Louisa Sargent Robinson (February 10, 1891 – December 18, 1977) was an American classical scholar. While working at North Central College, she published The Story of Greek Athletics (1927), which would later get an updated edition, Sources for the History of Greek Athletics (1955).

== Biography ==
Rachel Louisa Sargent was born on February 10, 1891, in Methuen, Massachusetts. Her parents were Agnes (née Jackman) and Walter Sargent.

Needing money for higher education tuition, she began working as a high school Latin teacher, teaching at Westbrook College (1914–1916) while she got her AB at Bates College in 1914. Afterwards she moved to Illinois and taught at Champaign Central High School (1917–1920) while studying at the nearby University of Illinois Urbana-Champaign, where she got her AM in 1917.

After teaching at Shortridge High School (1920–1922) in Indianapolis, she returned to the Champaign–Urbana metropolitan area, where she taught at University Laboratory High School (1922–1924) and got her PhD from the University of Illinois in 1923. Her PhD thesis, advised by William Abbott Oldfather, was titled The Size of the Slave Population at Athens during the Fifth and Fourth Centuries before Christ, and it was what allowed her to receive her Guggenheim Fellowship in 1928. She later used the fellowship to do research in Greece, which C. R. Trahman later called "one of the happiest periods in her life".

In 1924, she began working at North Central College, where she was a classics teacher until 1928 and was head of the Department of Classics from 1924 until 1929. In 1929, she moved to Western Reserve University and was an associate professor there until her resignation in 1931.

On June 20, 1931, she married Rodney Potter Robinson, a classics professor at the University of Cincinnati. The same year, she later moved to the University of Cincinnati, where she taught about English-language translations of Greek literature. She also spent several years organizing an informal session in which she and several classics students from the graduate school would spend an evening reading Greek together. She also accompanied him while he was Professor in Charge of the American Academy in Rome School of Classical Studies (1935–1937), and she would later take care of him after he had a severe myocardial infarction in 1941 until the latter's death on April 1, 1950. After her husband's death, she returned to academic positions to support herself financially, holding them at The Ohio State University, the University of Oklahoma, and Miami University.

As an academic, she specialized in sports in ancient history. While at North Central College, she and Oldfather worked on her 1927 book The Story of Greek Athletics. In 1955, she published Sources for the History of Greek Athletics, a larger update of The Story of Greek Athletics which would later see widespread usage in higher-educations courses in Ancient Greek sports.

Robinson died on December 18, 1977, in Cincinnati, aged 86. At the time of her death, she had been spending her free time working on a then-incomplete project similar to her 1927 book but focusing on the Roman era.

== Publications ==
- The Story of Greek Athletics (1927)
- Sources for the History of Greek Athletics (1955)
