= Bert Burridge =

English footballer

Personal information
- Full name: Ben James Herbert Burridge
- Date of birth: 11 March 1898
- Place of birth: Beamish, County Durham, England
- Date of death: 22 December 1977 (aged 79)
- Height: 5 ft 9 in (1.75 m)
- Position: Half-back

Senior career*
| Years | Team | Apps | (Gls) |
- Oxhill Villa
- Houghton Rovers
- Annfield Plain
| 1921–1926 | Darlington | 92 | (7) |
| 1926–1930 | Sheffield Wednesday | 26 | (0) |
| 1930–1931 | Oldham Athletic | 6 | (0) |
| 1931–1933 | Macclesfield | 51 | (1) |
| 1933–1934 | Hyde United | 35 | (2) |
| 1934–1940 | Hurst | | |
- Ashton National

Managerial career
- 1935–193?: Hurst
- * Club domestic league appearances and goals

Ben James Herbert Burridge (11 March 1898 – 22 December 1977) was an English footballer who made 124 appearances in the Football League for Darlington, Sheffield Wednesday and Oldham Athletic in the 1920s and 1930s. He played as a half-back – at wing half in the early part of his career, and at centre half later on – and could also play as a forward.

== Life and career ==
Burridge was born in Beamish, County Durham, in 1898. He was playing for Houghton Rovers in the North Eastern League in April 1921, but in November he signed for Third Division North club Darlington from Northern Alliance club Annfield Plain. Despite interest from "clubs in higher spheres", he was reported as preferring to remain near home. In the 1924–25 Football League season, Darlington were promoted to the Second Division as champions of the Northern Section. Burridge was not a regular member of the side, but his versatility – he could play across the half-back line or as a forward – meant he was able to establish himself as first reserve, and the supporters included him among those to receive a presentation in appreciation of the team's success.

Burridge became one of a number of new signings from the lower leagues made by Second Division champions Sheffield Wednesday ahead of their First Division campaign. He played only rarely in his first season with Wednesday, and although the £2,000 proceeds of his sale helped Darlington financially, his absence significantly weakened their team and they were relegated in 1926. By November 1927, he was playing more regularly for the first team, and the Derby Daily Telegraph assessed his strengths as "resolute tackling and robust defensive work". In 1928–29, Burridge appeared twice as Wednesday won the League championship and contributed to their reserve team winning the Central League title. In his last season with Wednesday, he again appeared twice as they retained their title, and then joined Second Division Oldham Athletic for an undisclosed fee.

A year later, he moved back into non-league football. By then playing at centre half, he captained Macclesfield to the 1931–32 Cheshire County League championship and appeared less frequently the following season as they retained the title. After a season as a first-team regular with another Cheshire League, club, Hyde United, Burridge made his debut for Hurst in a Cheshire League match against former club Macclesfield. He remained with Hurst as a player into the war years, making more than 100 appearances in all competitions, and was appointed player-manager in 1935 and acting secretary in 1937.

Burridge died in 1977 at the age of 79.
