= Walter Wedgwood =

Australian cricketer

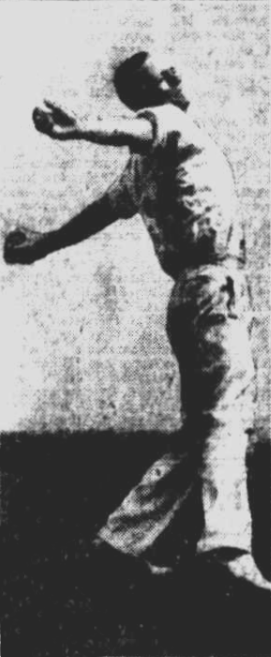

Personal information
- Born: 23 October 1912; Melbourne, Australia
- Died: 2 December 1977 (aged 65); Melbourne, Australia

Domestic team information
- Years: Team
- 1930: Victoria
- Source: Cricinfo, 21 November 2015

Walter Wedgwood (23 October 1912 – 2 December 1977) was an Australian cricketer. He played one first-class cricket match for Victoria in 1930.

== See also ==
- List of Victoria first-class cricketers
