= Teresa Incháustegui =

Mexican politician

- Born: 15 March 1952 (age 74); Mexico City, Mexico
- Occupation: Politician
- Political party: PRD

Teresa del Carmen Incháustegui Romero (born 15 March 1952) is a Mexican politician from the Party of the Democratic Revolution. From 2009 to 2012 she served as Deputy of the LXI Legislature of the Mexican Congress representing the Federal District.

== Early life and career ==
Inchuesetegui holds bachelor degree in Sociology from the National Autonomous University of Mexico (UNAM) and a PhD in Political Science with a specialization in Social Policy from the Latin American Faculty of Social Sciences (FLACSO-Mexico).

In 2014, she was appointed as the new director of the Institute of Women of the Federal District by the head of the capital Miguel Ángel Mancera.
