= Jacques Beltrand =

French engraver (1874–1977)

Jacques Anthony Louis Beltrand (22 July 1874 – 2 December 1977) was a French engraver.

== Works ==
=== Print ===
- 1907 : Laboureur, bois en couleurs pour Vita Nova de Dante illustré par Maurice Denis (avec ses frères Camille et Georges Beltrand).
- 1911 : Bois de L'Arbre tordu, Le Saule, Le Faune.
- 1912 : Le Paysage aux lapins et Le Chercheur de champignons, deux bois en camaïeu.
- 1913 : Cérès, bois en camaïeu.
- 1918 : Vieil Arbre, bois.
- 1919 : Les Petites Fleurs de Saint François d'Assise, 73 bois en couleurs d'après Maurice Denis (avec Camille et Georges Beltrand).
- 1920 : Petit Paysage à Belle De ou Le Coup de vent, bois.
- 1921 : La Divine Comédie, d'après les dessins de Botticelli. Trois volumes : L'Enfer, Le Purgatoire et Le Paradis, 1923.
- 1925 : Carnet de voyage en Italie d'après Maurice Denis, bois (avec Camille et Georges Beltrand).
- 1926 : Marine, fac-similé de lavis.
- 1927 : Maîtres et amis de Paul Valéry, bois en camaïeu.
- 1930 :
  - La Mort à Venise, bois en couleurs d'après Maurice Denis;
  - La Douce Enfance de Thierry Seneuse, bois originaux;
  - Mer sauvage à Belle-Île et Gros Temps à Belle-Île, bois.
- 1932 : plusieurs camaïeux de la forêt de Fontainebleau dont Le Paysage aux fougères.
- 1933 :
  - Les Thoniers à Belle-Île;
  - Crépuscule sur la mer d'André Suarès, bois d'après Maurice Denis.
- 1935 : Port du palais à Belle-Île, fac-similé de dessin à la plume.
- 1938 : Rochers de Belle-Île, bois.
- 1949 : Rosalinde sur l'eau d'André Suarès, bois gravés d'après ses aquarelles originales.
- 1950 : L'Isola Bella ou Belle De en Mer d'Anatole Le Braz, bois originaux.
- 1950 : La petite fille de Jérusalem de Myriam Harry, douze bois gravés d'après les compositions de Roger Bezombes.
- 1954 : Le Tombeau des poètes d'après André Dunoyer de Segonzac.
- 1956 : Les Vacances forcées d'après Raoul Dufy, bois en couleurs.
- 1958 : premier volume du Roman de Renart de Maurice Genevoix, bois d'après Paul Jouve.
- 1959 : second volume du Roman de Renart, bois en couleurs.
- 1962 : Le Sport de Jean Giraudoux, bois d'après les dessins d'André Dunoyer de Segonzac.

== Publication ==
Quatre entretiens sur la gravure originale, avec Jean Émile Laboureur, Claude Roger-Marx et Luc-Albert Moreau, Paris, 1938

== Expositions ==
- 1911 : Turin
- 1929 : Chicago, with the Société de la gravure sur bois originale
- 1932 : Sweden, Exposition of livre d'art
- 1935 : Milan, international fair
- 1938 : Cairo
- 1940 : Liège, Zagreb
- 1941 : Paris, Palais Galliera

== Awards ==
- 1890, 1^{er} prix de gravure et 2^{e} prix de dessin de la Société de gravure I^{er} degré.
- 1914 : chevalier de la Légion d'honneur.
- 1926 : officier de la Légion d'honneur.
- 1929 : médaillé au concours du musée Galliera (art religieux).
- 1939 : prix d'honneur quinquennal de gravure.
- 1957 : officier de l'ordre des Arts et des Lettres.

== Functions ==
- 1906 : membre de la Société des peintres-graveurs français.
- 1913 : vice-président de la Société des amis des cathédrales.
- 1922 :
  - président de la Société de Beethoven;
  - assesseur à la Société de gravure sur bois originale;
  - membre du Comité des Tuileries.
- 1926 : membre de la Société du Salon d'automne.
- 1927 : président de la Société des amis des cathédrales.
- 1930 : vice-président de la Société des peintres-graveurs français.
- 1931 : vice-président de l'Association des prix du Salon et boursiers du voyage.
- 1933 : président de la Société des peintres-graveurs français (jusqu'en 1946).
- 1937 :
  - vice-président (avec Jean Émile Laboureur) de la section arts et techniques consacrée à l'estampe à l'Exposition internationale de 1937;
  - membre du Conseil supérieur des beaux-arts.
- 1938 : président de l'Association des prix du Salon et boursiers du voyage.
- 1940 : vice-président du Comité national de la gravure française.
- 1941 : membre du Comité d'organisation professionnelle des arts graphiques et plastiques.
