= Arthur Morley =

Australian rules footballer, born 1908

Personal information
- Full name: Arthur Frederick Morley
- Born: 17 January 1908; North Fremantle, Western Australia
- Died: 14 December 1977 (aged 69); Glen Iris, Victoria
- Height: 175 cm (5 ft 9 in)
- Weight: 73 kg (161 lb)

Playing career^{1}
| Years | Club | Games (Goals) |
| 1930–1931 | North Melbourne | 5 (0) |
- ^{1} Playing statistics correct to the end of 1931.

Arthur Frederick Morley (17 January 1908 – 14 December 1977) was an Australian rules footballer who played for the North Melbourne Football Club in the Victorian Football League (VFL).

Morley later served in the Army Reserve from February 1942 after enlisting in Claremont, Western Australia.
