= Wilhelm Moberg =

Swedish sailor (1898–1977)

Wilhelm Reinhold Moberg (19 November 1898 – 23 December 1977) was a Swedish Olympic sailor. In the 1936 Summer Olympics, he sailed with the 8-metre Ilderim, helmed by Tore Holm, and finished 4th.
