= Paweł Lubina =

Polish footballer

Personal information
- Date of birth: 22 December 1896
- Place of birth: Katowice, German Empire
- Date of death: 6 December 1977 (aged 80)
- Place of death: Katowice, Poland
- Position: Midfielder

Senior career*
Years	Team	Apps	(Gls)
- Germania Katowice
1926–1927	PKS Katowice		
1927–1931	Pogoń Katowice		

International career
1926–1927	Poland	2	(0)
- * Club domestic league appearances and goals

Paweł Lubina (22 December 1896 – 6 December 1977) was a Polish footballer who played as a midfielder.

He earned two caps for the Poland national team from 1926 to 1927.
