= Bruce Bartle =

Australian rules footballer

Personal information
- Full name: Bruce Bartle
- Born: 21 January 1938
- Died: 6 December 1977 (aged 39)
- Height: 191 cm (6 ft 3 in)
- Weight: 80 kg (176 lb)

Playing career^{1}
Years	Club	Games (Goals)
1956–59	Geelong	34 (26)
- ^{1} Playing statistics correct to the end of 1959.

Bruce Bartle (21 January 1938 – 6 December 1977) was an Australian rules footballer who played with Geelong in the Victorian Football League (VFL).
