= Dick Noble =

Australian rules footballer, born 1915

Personal information
- Full name: Richard Patrick Noble
- Born: 3 May 1915; Fitzroy, Victoria
- Died: 17 December 1977 (aged 62); Box Hill, Victoria
- Original team: Fitzroy Districts
- Height: 178 cm (5 ft 10 in)
- Weight: 77 kg (170 lb)

Playing career^{1}
Years	Club	Games (Goals)
1937	Fitzroy	4 (0)
- ^{1} Playing statistics correct to the end of 1937.

Richard Patrick Noble (3 May 1915 – 17 December 1977) was an Australian rules footballer who played with Fitzroy in the Victorian Football League (VFL).
