= Jack Lake (footballer) =

Australian rules footballer, born 1914

Personal information
- Full name: Jack Everley Lake
- Born: 20 July 1914; Prahran, Victoria
- Died: 5 December 1977 (aged 63); Prahran, Victoria
- Original team: Prahran Districts
- Height: 178 cm (5 ft 10 in)
- Weight: 78 kg (172 lb)

Playing career^{1}
Years	Club	Games (Goals)
1934	St Kilda	2 (0)
- ^{1} Playing statistics correct to the end of 1934.

Jack Everley Lake (20 July 1914 – 5 December 1977) was an Australian rules footballer who played with St Kilda in the Victorian Football League (VFL).
