= Eric Tilley =

English cricketer

Eric Warrington Tilley (22 September 1913 – 1 December 1977) was an English cricketer who played for Leicestershire in 1946. He was born in Whatstandwell, Derbyshire and died in Leicester. He appeared in four first-class matches as a right-handed batsman who bowled right-arm fast medium. He scored three runs with a highest score of 2 and took ten wickets with a best performance of three for 33.
