= Harry Dussell =

Australian rules footballer, born 1900

Personal information
- Full name: Henri Dussell
- Born: 3 October 1900; Essendon, Victoria
- Died: 22 December 1977 (aged 77); Crescent Head, New South Wales
- Original team: Moonee Ponds
- Height: 182 cm (6 ft 0 in)

Playing career^{1}
Years	Club	Games (Goals)
1919–1921	Essendon	32 (16)
- ^{1} Playing statistics correct to the end of 1921.

Henri Dussell (3 October 1900 – 22 December 1977) was an Australian rules footballer for Essendon in the Victorian Football League (VFL).

Dussell began his VFL career for Essendon in 1919. He played his final VFL match in 1921 having played 32 matches.
