= Fritz Güntzler =

German politician

Fritz Güntzler MdB
- Güntzler in 2017

Member of the Bundestag; from Lower Saxony
- Incumbent
- Assumed office 22 October 2013
- Constituency: State list (2013–2025); Göttingen I (2025–present)

Member of the Landtag of Lower Saxony
- In office 23 June 2010 – 19 February 2013
- Preceded by: Christian Wulff
- Succeeded by: Burkhard Jasper
- Constituency: Osnabrück-West
- In office 26 January 2005 – 26 February 2008
- Preceded by: Friedrich Kethorn
- Succeeded by: Constituency abolished
- Constituency: Nordhorn

Personal details
- Born: 6 May 1966 (age 60) Cuxhaven, West Germany
- Party: Christian Democratic Union
- Children: 2
- Education: Saarland University; University of Göttingen

Fritz Güntzler (born 6 May 1966) is a German auditor and politician of the Christian Democratic Union (CDU) who has been serving as a member of the Bundestag from the state of Lower Saxony since 2013.

== Political career ==
Güntzler served as a member of the Landtag of Lower Saxony from 2005 until 2008 and from 2010 until 2013.

Güntzler first became a member of the Bundestag in the 2013 German federal election, representing Göttingen. In parliament, he is a member of the Finance Committee and the Sports Committee. He serves as his parliamentary group’s rapporteur on the property tax.

In the negotiations to form a Grand Coalition under the leadership of Friedrich Merz's Christian Democrats (CDU together with the Bavarian CSU) and the SPD following the 2025 German elections, Güntzler was part of the CDU/CSU delegation in the working group on public finances, led by Mathias Middelberg, Florian Oßner and Dennis Rohde.

As part of a cabinet reshuffle in 2026, Chancellor Merz asked Güntzler to succeed Patrick Schnieder as Minister for Transport; however, Güntzler ultimately withdrew from consideration.

== Other activities ==
=== Corporate boards ===
- DATEV, Member of the Advisory Board
- Moore Global Germany, Member of the Supervisory Board

=== Non-profit organizations ===
- Göttingen International Handel Festival, Member of the Supervisory Board
- Max Planck Institute for Biophysical Chemistry, Member of the Board of Trustees
- Max Planck Institute for Dynamics and Self-Organization, Member of the Board of Trustees
- Max Planck Institute for Solar System Research, Member of the Board of Trustees

== Political positions ==
In June 2017, Güntzler voted against his parliamentary group’s majority and in favor of Germany’s introduction of same-sex marriage.
