= Lighting Association =

Lighting Industry Association
- Abbreviation: LIA
- Formation: 2012
- Legal status: Non-profit company
- Purpose: Lighting in the United Kingdom
- Location: Stafford Park 7, Telford, Shropshire, TF3 3BQ
- Region served: UK
- Members: Lighting companies
- Joint Chief Executive's: Peter Hunt and Eddie Taylor
- Main organ: Council of Management, Technical Committee
- Affiliations: CELMA (Federation of National Manufacturers Associations for Luminaires and Electrotechnical Components for Luminaires in the European Union)
- Website: LIA

The Lighting Industry Association is Europe's largest trade association for lighting equipment professionals. This includes lighting manufacturers, suppliers, retailers, wholesalers, designers and all professionals active in the UK lighting market.

== History ==
The NEW Lighting Industry Association was formed on 1 January 2012 from the merging of the Lighting Industry Federation and the Lighting Association.

== Function ==
The Lighting Industry Association's mission is to strengthen the industry and promote the benefits of good quality lighting by representing all aspects of UK, EU and international legislation and standards at the highest level whilst protecting the interests of both the public and members.

=== Lighting Association Laboratory ===
The LIA laboratories are United Kingdom Accreditation Service (UKAS) accredited and the UK's main (or only) lighting testing (in a scientific manner) service. It tests lights to the main British Standard, BS EN 60598.

=== Student Lighting Awards ===
It hosts an awards for university (or art college) students involved in lighting, sponsored by companies such as Osram, Anglepoise and Dar Lighting

== Structure ==
It is based in Telford. The LIA employs around over 30 full-time staff.
