= Nicolae David =

Romanian footballer

Personal information
- Date of birth: 9 August 1915
- Place of birth: Panticeu, Austria-Hungary
- Date of death: 3 December 1977 (aged 62)
- Position: Midfielder

Senior career*
Years	Team	Apps	(Gls)
1932–1939	Universitatea Cluj	115	(4)
1940–1942	Mica Brad (Note: The statistics for the 1939–40 Divizia B season are unavailable.)	19	(0)
Total		134	(4)

International career
1934	Romania	2	(0)
- * Club domestic league appearances and goals

Nicolae David (9 August 1915 – 3 December 1977) was a Romanian football midfielder.

== International career ==
Nicolae David played two games at international level for Romania at the 1934–35 Balkan Cup, the first one was a 2–2 against Greece and the second was a 3–2 victory against Bulgaria.

== Honours ==
Mica Brad

- Divizia B: 1939–40
