= Harry Green (Australian footballer) =

Australian rules footballer

Personal information
- Full name: Harry William Green
- Born: 31 October 1920; Kaniva, Victoria
- Died: 31 December 1977 (aged 57); Dromana, Victoria
- Original team: North Brunswick Amateurs
- Height: 188 cm (6 ft 2 in)
- Weight: 81 kg (179 lb)

Playing career^{1}
Years	Club	Games (Goals)
1937–42, 1946	North Melbourne	46 (28)
- ^{1} Playing statistics correct to the end of 1946.

Harry William Green (31 October 1920 – 31 December 1977) was an Australian rules footballer who played with North Melbourne in the Victorian Football League (VFL).
