= Virginia Vera =

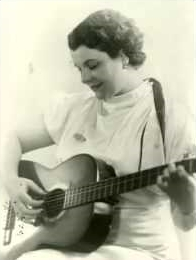
Virginia Vera

Virginia Vera née Borioli (1898–1949) was an Italian-born Argentine singer, guitarist, composer and actress who gained fame in Buenos Aires from the mid-1920s. In addition to stage appearances, she became a popular singer on various radio stations and made many recordings. Strongly influenced by local folk music, her favorite genres were the tango, milonga and ranchera. She frequently composed the music for her songs.

== Biography ==
Born in the Italian city of Pavia, Virginia Borioli was the daughter of Giuseppe Borioli and his wife Teresa née Guallini. After her father died in 1902, the family emigrated to Argentina where they settled in the little village of Herrera Vegas to the northwest of San Carlos de Bolívar in the province of Buenos Aires. When her mother died soon afterwards, she was brought up in nearby Pehuajó by her uncle and aunt, José María Roggero and his wife Luisa. Their son, Vera's cousin Aquiles Roggero (1913–1977), became a celebrated tango violinist. In October 1914, she married Juan Fabián Vera, a circus manager and singer. They had four children together.

After singing in her husband's circus from 1915, she first performed in Buenos Aires in the Rex Theatre in 1927, gaining increasing popularity thanks to radio broadcasts and her associations with other guitarists. She also toured the provinces and in 1930 began making recordings.

After suffering from a serious illness in February 1949, she died in Buenos Aires two months later on 12 April 1949.
