= Göttingen I (electoral district) =

Federal electoral district of Germany

53 Göttingen I
- Electoral district for the Bundestag
- Göttingen in 2025
- State: Lower Saxony
- Population: 284,700 (2019)
- Electorate: 214,542 (2021)
- Major settlements: Göttingen; Hann. Münden; Duderstadt
- Area: 1,265.2 km^{2}

Current electoral district
- Created: 1949
- Party: CDU
- Member: Fritz Güntzler
- Elected: 2025

Göttingen I is an electoral constituency (German: Wahlkreis) represented in the Bundestag. It elects one member via first-past-the-post voting. Under the current constituency numbering system, it is designated as constituency 53. It is located in southern Lower Saxony, comprising most of the Göttingen district.

Göttingen was created for the inaugural 1949 federal election. Since 2021, it has been represented by Andreas Philippi of the Social Democratic Party (SPD).

At the 2025 German federal election, the constituency will be renamed Göttingen I.

== Geography ==
Göttingen is located in southern Lower Saxony. As of the 2021 federal election, it comprises the district of Göttingen excluding the municipalities of Bad Grund, Osterode am Harz, and Walkenried, the Samtgemeinde of Hattorf am Harz, and the Harz area.

== History ==
Göttingen was created in 1949, then known as Göttingen – Münden. It acquired its current name in the 1965 election. In the inaugural Bundestag election, it was Lower Saxony constituency 34 in the numbering system. From 1953 through 1961, it was number 56. From 1965 through 1998, it was number 49. In the 2002 and 2005 elections, it was number 53. In the 2009 election, it was number 54. Since the 2013 election, it has been number 53.

Originally, the constituency comprised the independent city of Göttingen and the districts of Göttingen and Münden. In the 1965 through 1972 elections, it comprised the districts of Göttingen, Münden, and Duderstadt, and the municipality of Fürstenhagen from the Northeim district. In the 1976 election, it comprised the Göttingen and the municipality of Fürstenhagen from the Northeim district. In the 1980 through 1998 elections, it comprised only the district of Göttingen. In the 2002 though 2013 elections, it comprised the district of Göttingen and the municipalities of Bad Lauterberg, Bad Sachsa, and Herzberg am Harz from the district of Osterode. Osterode district was merged into Göttingen ahead of the 2017 election, but the constituency's borders did not change.

Election	No.	Name	Borders
1949	34	Göttingen – Münden	Göttingen city; Göttingen district; Münden district
1953	56	Göttingen – Münden	Göttingen city; Göttingen district; Münden district
1957	56	Göttingen – Münden	Göttingen city; Göttingen district; Münden district
1961	56	Göttingen – Münden	Göttingen city; Göttingen district; Münden district
1965	49	Göttingen	Göttingen district; Münden district; Duderstadt district; Northeim district (only Fürstenhagen municipality)
1969	49	Göttingen	Göttingen district; Münden district; Duderstadt district; Northeim district (only Fürstenhagen municipality)
1972	49	Göttingen	Göttingen district; Münden district; Duderstadt district; Northeim district (only Fürstenhagen municipality)
1976	49	Göttingen	Göttingen district; Northeim district (only Fürstenhagen municipality)
1980	49	Göttingen	Göttingen district
1983	49	Göttingen	Göttingen district
1987	49	Göttingen	Göttingen district
1990	49	Göttingen	Göttingen district
1994	49	Göttingen	Göttingen district
1998	49	Göttingen	Göttingen district
2002	53	Göttingen	Göttingen district; Osterode district (only Bad Lauterberg, Bad Sachsa, and Herzberg am Harz municipalities)
2005	53	Göttingen	Göttingen district; Osterode district (only Bad Lauterberg, Bad Sachsa, and Herzberg am Harz municipalities)
2009	54	Göttingen	Göttingen district; Osterode district (only Bad Lauterberg, Bad Sachsa, and Herzberg am Harz municipalities)
2013	53	Göttingen	Göttingen district; Osterode district (only Bad Lauterberg, Bad Sachsa, and Herzberg am Harz municipalities)
2017	53	Göttingen	Göttingen district (excluding Bad Grund, Osterode am Harz, and Walkenried municipalities, Hattorf am Harz Samtgemeinde, and the Harz area)
2021	53	Göttingen	Göttingen district (excluding Bad Grund, Osterode am Harz, and Walkenried municipalities, Hattorf am Harz Samtgemeinde, and the Harz area)
2025	53	Göttingen	Göttingen district (excluding Bad Grund, Osterode am Harz, and Walkenried municipalities, Hattorf am Harz Samtgemeinde, and the Harz area)

== Members ==
The constituency was first held by Arno Hennig of the Social Democratic Party (SPD), who served from 1949 to 1953. Walter Drechsel of the Free Democratic Party (FDP) was elected in 1953 and served a single term. Franz Blücher, Vice-Chancellor of Germany and former chairman of the FDP, was elected as candidate for the German Party in 1957. He died in 1959, and was succeeded by Günter Frede of the SPD in the 1961 election. The Christian Democratic Union (CDU) won the constituency in 1965, and Willy Steinmetz served a single term as representative. Günter Wichert was elected in 1969 and served two terms. Fellow SPD member Lothar Curdt served from 1976 to 1983. In 1983, Hans Hugo Klein won the constituency for the CDU, and was succeeded in 1987 by Rita Süssmuth, also of the CDU. Süssmuth served as President of the Bundestag from 1988 to 1998. The SPD regained the constituency with candidate Inge Wettig-Danielmeier in 1998. In 2005, Thomas Oppermann was elected representative. He was re-elected in 2009, 2013, and 2017. Oppermann died in October 2020. Andreas Philippi was elected as his successor in 2021.

Election	Member	Party	%
1949	Arno Hennig	SPD	31.6
1953	Walter Drechsel	FDP	54.3
1957	Franz Blücher	DP	39.5
1961	Günter Frede	SPD	43.0
1965	Willy Steinmetz	CDU	47.0
1969	Günter Wichert	SPD	47.8
1972	Günter Wichert	SPD	52.5
1976	Lothar Curdt	SPD	46.3
1980	Lothar Curdt	SPD	47.9
1983	Hans Hugo Klein	CDU	46.9
1987	Rita Süssmuth	CDU	44.9
1990	Rita Süssmuth	CDU	48.5
1994	Rita Süssmuth	CDU	46.9
1998	Inge Wettig-Danielmeier	SPD	48.2
2002	Inge Wettig-Danielmeier	SPD	47.4
2005	Thomas Oppermann	SPD	46.8
2009	Thomas Oppermann	SPD	36.8
2013	Thomas Oppermann	SPD	40.4
2017	Thomas Oppermann	SPD	34.9
2021	Andreas Philippi	SPD	32.2
2025	Fritz Güntzler	CDU	29.1

== Election results ==
=== 2025 election ===
Federal election (2025): Göttingen
Notes:	Blue background denotes the winner of the electorate vote. Pink background denotes a candidate elected from their party list. Yellow background denotes an electorate win by a list member, or other incumbent. A ✓ or ✗ denotes status of any incumbent, win or lose respectively.						
Party	Candidate	Votes	%	±%	Party votes	%	±%
CDU	Fritz Güntzler	50,738	29.1	▲2.2	44,788	25.6	▲4.1
SPD	Thorsten Heinze	44,620	25.6	▼6.6	38,345	22.0	▼10.0
Greens	Viola von Cramon-Taubadel	26,770	15.4	▼7.9	27,390	15.7	▼4.6
AfD	Erik Heß	24,752	14.2		25,266	14.5	▲8.4
Left	Thomas Goes	15,937	9.1	▲4.1	19,429	11.1	▲6.1
BSW					6,601	3.8	
FDP	Konstantin Kuhle	6,320	3.6	▼5.9	6,911	4.0	▼5.8
Volt	Tarek Zaibi	2,557	1.5		1,199	0.7	▲0.4
FW	Dirk Kaitschick	2,217	1.3		1,126	0.6	▼0.1
Tierschutzpartei					1,864	1.1	0.0
PARTEI					756	0.4	▼0.6
dieBasis				▼2.1	300	0.2	▼0.8
MLPD	Kay Langemeier	292	0.1	0.0	84	0.0	0.0
Pirates					262	0.2	▼0.2
BD					179	0.1	
Humanists					127	0.1	0.0
Team Todenhöfer							▼0.2
ÖDP							▼0.1
Informal votes		1,341			917		
Total valid votes		174,203			174,627		
Turnout		175,544	83.5	▲8.1			
CDU gain from SPD	Majority	6,118	3.5	▲8.8			

=== 2021 election ===
Federal election (2021): Göttingen
Notes:	Blue background denotes the winner of the electorate vote. Pink background denotes a candidate elected from their party list. Yellow background denotes an electorate win by a list member, or other incumbent. A ✓ or ✗ denotes status of any incumbent, win or lose respectively.						
Party	Candidate	Votes	%	±%	Party votes	%	±%
SPD	Andreas Philippi	51,385	32.2	▼2.7	51,180	31.9	▲3.7
CDU	Fritz Güntzler	42,958	26.9	▼6.3	34,588	21.6	▼8.6
Greens	Jürgen Trittin	37,060	23.2	▲11.9	32,448	20.2	▲8.6
FDP	Konstantin Kuhle	15,261	9.6	▲5.0	15,638	9.8	▲0.6
AfD					9,785	6.1	▼1.8
Left	Thomas Goes	8,057	5.1	▼0.8	8,132	5.1	▼3.6
Tierschutzpartei					1,713	1.1	▲0.2
PARTEI					1,625	1.0	0.0
dieBasis	Gabriele Winkel	3,428	2.1		1,570	1.0	
FW					1,259	0.8	▲0.2
Pirates					569	0.4	▼0.1
Volt					512	0.3	
Team Todenhöfer					379	0.2	
NPD					174	0.1	▼0.1
Humanists					164	0.1	
ÖDP					136	0.1	0.0
V-Partei3					125	0.1	▼0.1
du.					111	0.1	
LKR	Olaf Töpperwien	767	0.5		78	0.0	
DKP	Manfred Sohn	329	0.2		73	0.0	0.0
MLPD	Kay Langemeier	232	0.1	0.0	46	0.0	0.0
Informal votes		2,399			1,571		
Total valid votes		159,477			160,305		
Turnout		161,876	75.5	▼1.9			
SPD hold	Majority	8,427	5.3	▲3.7			

=== 2017 election ===
Federal election (2017): Göttingen
Notes:	Blue background denotes the winner of the electorate vote. Pink background denotes a candidate elected from their party list. Yellow background denotes an electorate win by a list member, or other incumbent. A ✓ or ✗ denotes status of any incumbent, win or lose respectively.						
Party	Candidate	Votes	%	±%	Party votes	%	±%
SPD	✓ Thomas Oppermann	59,032	34.9	▼5.5	47,871	28.3	▼4.8
CDU	Fritz Güntzler	56,250	33.3	▼4.9	51,177	30.2	▼5.7
Greens	Jürgen Trittin	19,131	11.3	▲1.1	19,676	11.6	▼0.6
AfD	Pierre Hillebrecht	11,870	7.0		13,446	7.9	▲4.2
Left	Konrad Kelm	9,905	5.9	▲0.6	14,748	8.7	▲2.4
FDP	Konstantin Kuhle	7,734	4.6	▲3.0	15,421	9.1	▲5.0
PARTEI	Christian Prachar	2,159	1.3		1,776	1.0	
Tierschutzpartei					1,434	0.8	▲0.1
FW	Rainer Nowak	1,458	0.9	▼0.5	1,063	0.6	▼0.2
Pirates	Dana Maria Rotter	1,400	0.8	▼1.1	785	0.5	▼1.5
NPD					423	0.2	▼0.5
BGE					401	0.2	
DiB					315	0.2	
DM					253	0.1	
V-Partei³					224	0.1	
ÖDP					163	0.1	
MLPD	Kay Langemeier	169	0.1		76	0.0	0.0
DKP					72	0.0	
Informal votes		1,439			1,223		
Total valid votes		169,108			169,324		
Turnout		170,547	77.4	▲2.7			
SPD hold	Majority	2,782	1.6	▼0.6			

=== 2013 election ===
Federal election (2013): Göttingen
Notes:	Blue background denotes the winner of the electorate vote. Pink background denotes a candidate elected from their party list. Yellow background denotes an electorate win by a list member, or other incumbent. A ✓ or ✗ denotes status of any incumbent, win or lose respectively.						
Party	Candidate	Votes	%	±%	Party votes	%	±%
SPD	✓ Thomas Oppermann	66,192	40.4	▲3.6	54,410	33.1	▲3.5
CDU	Fritz Güntzler	62,558	38.2	▲3.8	59,000	35.9	▲7.1
Greens	Jürgen Trittin	16,740	10.2	▼2.8	20,076	12.2	▼2.2
Left	Gerhard Nier	8,581	5.2	▼2.4	10,432	6.3	▼2.5
AfD					6,121	3.7	
Pirates	Niels-Arne Münch	3,219	2.0		3,173	1.9	▼0.3
FDP	Lutz Knopek	2,633	1.6	▼4.9	6,667	4.1	▼9.4
FW	Theodor Sommer	2,187	1.3		1,427	0.9	
NPD	Marco Borrmann	1,730	1.1	▼0.4	1,280	0.8	▼0.5
Tierschutzpartei					1,178	0.7	0.0
PRO					234	0.1	
PBC					145	0.1	
REP					93	0.1	
MLPD					67	0.0	0.0
Informal votes		1,974			1,511		
Total valid votes		163,840			164,303		
Turnout		165,814	74.7	▲0.5			
SPD hold	Majority	3,634	2.2	▼0.2			

=== 2009 election ===
Federal election (2009): Göttingen
Notes:	Blue background denotes the winner of the electorate vote. Pink background denotes a candidate elected from their party list. Yellow background denotes an electorate win by a list member, or other incumbent. A ✓ or ✗ denotes status of any incumbent, win or lose respectively.						
Party	Candidate	Votes	%	±%	Party votes	%	±%
SPD	✓ Thomas Oppermann	60,483	36.8	▼10.0	48,788	29.6	▼12.5
CDU	Hartwig Fischer	56,503	34.4	▼1.3	47,343	28.8	▼1.7
Greens	Jürgen Trittin	21,360	13.0	▲5.2	23,708	14.4	▲3.7
Left	Gerd Nier	12,493	7.6	▲3.3	14,635	8.9	▲3.7
FDP	Lutz Knopek	10,765	6.6	▲3.0	22,086	13.4	▲4.5
Pirates					3,707	2.3	
NPD	Michael Hahn	2,323	1.4	▲0.1	2,072	1.3	▼0.1
Tierschutzpartei					1,176	0.7	▲0.2
RRP					724	0.4	
Independent	Bayram Kurnaz	361	0.2				
ÖDP					195	0.1	
DVU					115	0.1	
MLPD					58	0.0	0.0
Informal votes		2,227			1,908		
Total valid votes		164,288			164,607		
Turnout		166,515	74.2	▼5.6			
SPD hold	Majority	3,980	2.4	▼8.7			

=== 2005 election ===
Federal election (2005):Göttingen
Notes:	Blue background denotes the winner of the electorate vote. Pink background denotes a candidate elected from their party list. Yellow background denotes an electorate win by a list member, or other incumbent. A ✓ or ✗ denotes status of any incumbent, win or lose respectively.						
Party	Candidate	Votes	%	±%	Party votes	%	±%
SPD	Thomas Oppermann	83,493	46.8	▼0.6	75,126	42.1	▼4.1
CDU	Hartwig Fischer	63,639	35.7	▼0.1	54,431	30.5	▼2.1
Greens	Jürgen Trittin	13,854	7.8	▼1.9	19,066	10.7	▼0.2
Left	Sabine Lösing	7,624	4.3	▲2.8	9,267	5.2	▲3.5
FDP	Norbert Ullrich	6,324	3.5	▼0.9	15,980	9.0	▲2.3
NPD	Daniel Hubert	2,356	1.3	▲0.6	2,353	1.3	▲0.8
Tierschutzpartei					941	0.5	▲0.2
GRAUEN					762	0.4	▲0.2
Independent	Helga Bürmann-Hackbarth	673	0.4				
Independent	Al-Masri Mansour	309	0.2				
PBC					232	0.1	0.0
Pro German Center – Pro D-Mark Initiative					142	0.1	
BüSo					94	0.1	0.0
MLPD					85	0.0	
Informal votes		2,425			2,218		
Total valid votes		178,272			178,479		
Turnout		180,697	79.8	▼1.4			
SPD hold	Majority	19,854	11.1				
