= Arnold Hazeland Jr. =

Norwegian civil servant and judge

Arnold Hazeland Jr. (8 May 1900 – 15 December 1977) was a Norwegian civil servant and judge.

He was born in Kristiania as a son of Supreme Court Justice Arnold Hazeland (1859–1945) and Anna Wilhelmine Schjølberg (1871–1946). He finished his secondary education in 1918, and graduated from the Royal Frederick University with the cand.jur. degree in 1925. Since 1927 he was married to Sofie Wold.

He was a deputy judge from 1927 to 1929, then a secretary in Oslo municipality; first in the tax authority until 1938, then under the chief administrative officer of finances from 1938 to 1941. At the time this was criticized as a political appointment, since the burgomaster had suggested that Thor Stabenfeldt be hired. In the executive committee of Oslo city council, Stabenfeldt carried the 10 bourgeois votes whereas the Labour Party gathered 11 votes for Hazeland, who then prevailed. During the Second World War Hazeland left the civil service and was a junior solicitor and an attorney. After the war he served as tax director in Oslo from 1946 to 1951 and presiding judge in Eidsivating Court of Appeal from 1951 to 1969. He died in December 1977 and was buried in Vår Frelsers gravlund.
