= C. T. Singleton Jr. =

Charles Tod Singleton Jr.
- Born: July 3, 1905; Laurel, Mississippi
- Died: December 21, 1977 (aged 72); Fort Ord, California
- Burial place: Arlington National Cemetery
- Military career
- Allegiance: United States
- Branch: United States Navy
- Service years: 1926–1956
- Rank: Rear Admiral
- Commands: Brooks (DD-232); Kalk (DD-611); Destroyer Squadron Six
- Conflicts: World War II; Korean War

Charles Tod Singleton Jr. (July 3, 1905 – December 21, 1977) was a Rear Admiral of the United States Navy, who served during World War II and the Korean War.

== Biography ==
Singleton was born in Laurel, Mississippi, graduating from the United States Naval Academy in 1926.

During World War II, he commanded the destroyers Brooks (DD-232) and Kalk (DD-611) in the Aleutian Islands Campaign.

Singleton commanded the first American destroyer to enter the Mediterranean, and he was in combat in North Africa, Salerno and Anzio. He served as Commodore of Destroyer Squadron Six, commanding 12 destroyers with 2,400 men.

He was a member of the Joint Chiefs of Staff during the Korean War, and a division commander during the Inchon landings.

He held the Bronze Star for combat action in Normandy and the Legion of Merit as Deputy Chief of Staff, Commander Naval Forces Far East.

At the time of his retirement in 1956, Singleton was director of the engineering school at the Naval Postgraduate School in Monterey, the same school he had earlier advocated establishing on the Monterey Peninsula after World War II when he was executive officer at the school.

After his retirement from military service, he was named head of the University of California Engineering and Science Extension at Berkeley. He retired again in July 1961, so that he and Mrs. Singleton, the former Mary Frances Morris whom he married in 1927, could travel.

From his home in Rancho Aguajito, Singleton was active in community affairs. He was a member of the advisory committee of the Monterey Peninsula Planning Commission; served as president of the Aguajito Property Owners Association; served as president of the Peninsula branch of the World Affairs Council and on the governing board in San Francisco. He was also on the advisory board of the Society for the Prevention of Cruelty to Animals; a director of the Monterey Foundation; and member of the Naval Academy Alumni Association; a lifetime director of the Monterey Institute of Foreign Studies; and of the Retired Officers Association.

Singleton died at the Silas B. Hays Hospital at Fort Ord, and was buried at Arlington National Cemetery, with full military honors.
