= Cyril Thomas (rugby union) =

- Full name: Cyril Rhys Thomas
- Born: 27 March 1902 Oldcastle, Bridgend, Wales
- Died: 5 December 1977 (aged 75) Newport, Wales

Rugby union career
- Position: Wing
International career
Years	Team	Apps	(Points)
1925	Wales	2	(3)

Cyril Rhys Thomas (27 March 1902 – 5 December 1977) was a Welsh international rugby union player.

Thomas hailed from Oldcastle, Bridgend, and was a wing three–quarter. He began playing regularly in the first XV for Bridgend in 1923, within a season of having joined the reserves. After ascending to the Bridgend captaincy, Thomas got his opportunity to play international rugby in 1925, as a left winger for two Five Nations fixtures. He won his selection on the back of a season in which he topped the try scoring tally in Welsh first–class rugby.

A policeman, Thomas was a constable with Glamorgan Police during his career.

== See also ==
- List of Wales national rugby union players
