= Mario García Incháustegui =

Mario García Incháustegui (c. September 1924 – 4 December 1977) was a Cuban Ambassador to Japan from 1974 until his death in 1977.

== Life ==
Mario García Incháustegui was born to a wealthy Spanish housewares importer. He was married to Gladys Delgado Ortiz.

Incháustegui studied law at the University of Havana and received his doctorates in both civil and consular law. He was a judge under the dictatorship of Fulgencio Batista. In the 1950s he went to Caracas, Venezuela. He returned to Cuba in 1959 and was appointed judge in the Oriente province and the extraordinary envoy. Incháustegui was also appointed as Ministre plénipotentiaire in Montevideo.

In November 1959, under the government of Alfredo Stroessner Incháustegui became both the Cuban ambassador to Uruguay and ambassador to Paraguay. On 12 January 1961, under the chairmanship of Benito Nardone in Montevideo, the Consejo Nacional de Gobierno declared Incháustegui persona non grata. He was accused on 21 November 1960 of supporting labor disputes.

Incháustegui then became a representative of the Cuban government at the Headquarters of the United Nations. During the Cuban missile crisis in October 1962, he described the Soviet missiles as defensive and that the naval blockade imposed by the Kennedy administration was a military act. From 1963 to 1968, he headed the international organizations department of the Ministerio del Comercio Exterior (MINCEX), (Cuban Foreign Trade Ministry) and represented the Cuban government at numerous international conferences, such as conducting negotiations at the meetings of the International Coffee Organization in London. From 1969 to 1970, he represented the Cuban government at the United Nations Office at Geneva.

On 9 December 1970, Incháustegui was appointed as ambassador to Chile where he served from 1971 to 11 September 1973. From 1974, he was the Cuban Ambassador to Japan and in 1977 was also accredited to the government in Kuala Lumpur. Incháustegui and his wife boarded Malaysia Airline System Flight 653 on 4 December 1977. The aircraft was hijacked mid-flight. During the diversion however, the aircraft crashed, killing everyone on board.
