= Hannover-Land I =

Federal electoral district of Germany

43 Hannover-Land I
- Electoral district for the Bundestag
- Hannover-Land I in 2025
- State: Lower Saxony
- Population: 306,400 (2019)
- Electorate: 231,250 (2021)
- Major settlements: Garbsen; Langenhagen; Neustadt am Rübenberge
- Area: 1,135.7 km^{2}

Current electoral district
- Created: 1980
- Party: CDU
- Member: Hendrik Hoppenstedt
- Elected: 2025

Hannover-Land I is an electoral constituency (German: Wahlkreis) represented in the Bundestag. It elects one member via first-past-the-post voting. Under the current constituency numbering system, it is designated as constituency 43. It is located in central Lower Saxony, comprising the northern part of the Hanover Region.

Hannover-Land I was created for the 1980 federal election. From 2021 to 2025, it has been represented by Rebecca Schamber of the Social Democratic Party (SPD). Since 2025 it has been represented by Hendrik Hoppenstedt of the CDU.

== Geography ==
Hannover-Land I is located in central Lower Saxony. As of the 2021 federal election, it comprises the northern part of the Hanover Region, specifically the municipalities of Burgdorf, Burgwedel, Garbsen, Isernhagen, Langenhagen, Neustadt am Rübenberge, Wedemark, and Wunstorf.

== History ==
Hannover-Land I was created in 1980 and contained parts of the abolished constituencies of Hannover III, Schaumburg, Celle, and Gifhorn. From the 1980 through 1998 elections, it was number 38. In the 2002 and 2005 elections, it was number 43. In the 2009 election, it was number 44. Since the 2013 election, it has been number 43.

Originally, the constituency comprised the municipalities of Burgdorf, Burgwedel, Garbsen, Isernhagen, Langenhagen, Neustadt am Rübenberge, Wedemark, Lehrte, and Uetze from the now-abolished Landkreis Hannover district. In the 2002 election, it lost the municipalities of Lehrte and Uetze while gaining Wunstorf.

Election	No.	Name	Borders
1980	38	Hannover-Land I	Landkreis Hannover district (only Burgdorf, Burgwedel, Garbsen, Isernhagen, Langenhagen, Neustadt am Rübenberge, Wedemark, Lehrte, and Uetze municipalities)
1983	38	Hannover-Land I	Landkreis Hannover district (only Burgdorf, Burgwedel, Garbsen, Isernhagen, Langenhagen, Neustadt am Rübenberge, Wedemark, Lehrte, and Uetze municipalities)
1987	38	Hannover-Land I	Landkreis Hannover district (only Burgdorf, Burgwedel, Garbsen, Isernhagen, Langenhagen, Neustadt am Rübenberge, Wedemark, Lehrte, and Uetze municipalities)
1990	38	Hannover-Land I	Landkreis Hannover district (only Burgdorf, Burgwedel, Garbsen, Isernhagen, Langenhagen, Neustadt am Rübenberge, Wedemark, Lehrte, and Uetze municipalities)
1994	38	Hannover-Land I	Landkreis Hannover district (only Burgdorf, Burgwedel, Garbsen, Isernhagen, Langenhagen, Neustadt am Rübenberge, Wedemark, Lehrte, and Uetze municipalities)
1998	38	Hannover-Land I	Landkreis Hannover district (only Burgdorf, Burgwedel, Garbsen, Isernhagen, Langenhagen, Neustadt am Rübenberge, Wedemark, Lehrte, and Uetze municipalities)
2002	43	Hannover-Land I	Hanover Region (only Burgdorf, Burgwedel, Garbsen, Isernhagen, Langenhagen, Neustadt am Rübenberge, Wedemark, and Wunstorf municipalities)
2005	43	Hannover-Land I	Hanover Region (only Burgdorf, Burgwedel, Garbsen, Isernhagen, Langenhagen, Neustadt am Rübenberge, Wedemark, and Wunstorf municipalities)
2009	44	Hannover-Land I	Hanover Region (only Burgdorf, Burgwedel, Garbsen, Isernhagen, Langenhagen, Neustadt am Rübenberge, Wedemark, and Wunstorf municipalities)
2013	43	Hannover-Land I	Hanover Region (only Burgdorf, Burgwedel, Garbsen, Isernhagen, Langenhagen, Neustadt am Rübenberge, Wedemark, and Wunstorf municipalities)
2017	43	Hannover-Land I	Hanover Region (only Burgdorf, Burgwedel, Garbsen, Isernhagen, Langenhagen, Neustadt am Rübenberge, Wedemark, and Wunstorf municipalities)
2021	43	Hannover-Land I	Hanover Region (only Burgdorf, Burgwedel, Garbsen, Isernhagen, Langenhagen, Neustadt am Rübenberge, Wedemark, and Wunstorf municipalities)
2025	43	Hannover-Land I	Hanover Region (only Burgdorf, Burgwedel, Garbsen, Isernhagen, Langenhagen, Neustadt am Rübenberge, Wedemark, and Wunstorf municipalities)

== Members ==
The constituency was first held by future Chancellor of Germany Gerhard Schröder, a member of the Social Democratic Party (SPD), who served from 1980 to 1983. Dietmar Kansy of the Christian Democratic Union (CDU) was elected in 1983 and served until 1998. SPD candidate Monika Ganseforth won in 1998 and served a single term, before being succeeded by party fellow Caren Marks in 2002. In 2013, Hendrik Hoppenstedt of the CDU was elected representative. Rebecca Schamber regained the constituency for the SPD in 2021.

Election	Member	Party	%
1980	Gerhard Schröder	SPD	50.0
1983	Dietmar Kansy	CDU	49.0
1987	Dietmar Kansy	CDU	45.0
1990	Dietmar Kansy	CDU	46.3
1994	Dietmar Kansy	CDU	46.5
1998	Monika Ganseforth	SPD	53.3
2002	Caren Marks	SPD	52.8
2005	Caren Marks	SPD	49.9
2009	Caren Marks	SPD	38.7
2013	Hendrik Hoppenstedt	CDU	44.3
2017	Hendrik Hoppenstedt	CDU	40.1
2021	Rebecca Schamber	SPD	33.7
2025	Hendrik Hoppenstedt	CDU	34.8

== Election results ==
=== 2025 election ===
Federal election (2025): Hannover-Land I
Notes:	Blue background denotes the winner of the electorate vote. Pink background denotes a candidate elected from their party list. Yellow background denotes an electorate win by a list member, or other incumbent. A ✓ or ✗ denotes status of any incumbent, win or lose respectively.						
Party	Candidate	Votes	%	±%	Party votes	%	±%
CDU	Hendrik Hoppenstedt	66,483	34.8	▲2.9	56,900	29.8	▲4.0
SPD	✗ Rebecca Schamber	52,312	27.4	▼6.3	43,417	22.7	▼9.4
AfD	Dirk Brandes	33,139	17.4	▲9.9	33,247	17.4	▲9.7
Greens	Jessica Peine	18,119	9.5	▼3.5	21,753	11.4	▼3.8
Left	Volker Napp	10,430	5.5	▲3.2	13,208	6.9	▲4.3
BSW					7,450	3.9	
FDP	Jelger Tosch	5,101	2.7	▼4.6	8,729	4.6	▼6.8
FW	Kerstin Obladen	2,523	1.3		1,275	0.7	0.0
Tierschutzpartei				▼1.8	2,330	1.2	▼0.3
Volt	Alexandra Pogorzelski	1,854	1.0		986	0.5	▲0.3
BD	Hermann Meyer	1,003	0.5		340	0.2	
PARTEI				▼1.0	722	0.4	▼0.4
dieBasis				▼1.0	417	0.2	▼0.7
Pirates				▼0.6	301	0.2	▼0.2
Humanists					117	0.1	Steady
MLPD					50	0.0	0.0
Team Todenhöfer							▼0.5
ÖDP							▼0.1
Informal votes		1,263			984		
Total valid votes		190,964			191,243		
Turnout		192,227	84.6	▲9.1			
CDU gain from SPD	Majority	14,171	7.4				

=== 2021 election ===
Federal election (2021): Hannover-Land I
Notes:	Blue background denotes the winner of the electorate vote. Pink background denotes a candidate elected from their party list. Yellow background denotes an electorate win by a list member, or other incumbent. A ✓ or ✗ denotes status of any incumbent, win or lose respectively.						
Party	Candidate	Votes	%	±%	Party votes	%	±%
SPD	Rebecca Schamber	58,297	33.7	▲0.6	55,464	32.1	▲5.1
CDU	✗ Hendrik Hoppenstedt	55,185	31.9	▼8.3	44,529	25.8	▼9.0
Greens	Jens Palandt	22,490	13.0	▲7.0	26,219	15.2	▲7.2
AfD	Dietmar Friedhoff	12,942	7.5	▼2.1	13,295	7.7	▼2.5
FDP	Grigorios Aggelidis	12,557	7.3	▲2.1	19,550	11.3	▲0.9
Left	Michael Braedt	3,981	2.3	▼2.7	4,504	2.6	▼3.4
Tierschutzpartei	Jens Klingebiel	3,080	1.8		2,637	1.5	▲0.7
dieBasis	Iris Krobjinski	1,727	1.0		1,564	0.9	
PARTEI	Ýr Langhorst	1,662	1.0		1,355	0.8	0.0
FW					1,077	0.6	▲0.2
Team Todenhöfer					802	0.5	
Pirates	Olaf Engel	988	0.6		692	0.4	0.0
Volt					328	0.2	
Humanists					141	0.1	
NPD					130	0.1	▼0.1
ÖDP					113	0.1	0.0
V-Partei3					95	0.1	▼0.1
du.					72	0.0	
LKR	Mirco Zschoch	142	0.1		66	0.0	
MLPD					36	0.0	0.0
DKP					33	0.0	0.0
Independent	Inessa Kober	66	0.0				
Informal votes		1,464			1,879		
Total valid votes		173,117			172,702		
Turnout		174,581	75.5	▼2.5			
SPD gain from CDU	Majority	3,112	1.8				

=== 2017 election ===
Federal election (2017): Hannover-Land I
Notes:	Blue background denotes the winner of the electorate vote. Pink background denotes a candidate elected from their party list. Yellow background denotes an electorate win by a list member, or other incumbent. A ✓ or ✗ denotes status of any incumbent, win or lose respectively.						
Party	Candidate	Votes	%	±%	Party votes	%	±%
CDU	✓ Hendrik Hoppenstedt	72,282	40.1	▼4.2	62,828	34.8	▼6.4
SPD	Caren Marks	59,552	33.1	▼5.5	48,783	27.0	▼6.0
AfD	Dietmar Friedhoff	17,217	9.6	▲6.5	18,366	10.2	▲6.2
Greens	Eike Lengemann	10,725	6.0	▲1.0	14,335	7.9	▼0.2
FDP	Grigorios Aggelidis	9,325	5.2	▲2.6	18,869	10.5	▲5.5
Left	Diether Dehm	8,958	5.0	▲1.4	10,890	6.0	▲1.5
FW	Markus Moschner	2,037	1.1	▲0.5	830	0.5	▼0.1
Tierschutzpartei					1,516	0.8	▲0.1
PARTEI					1,450	0.8	
Pirates					653	0.4	▼1.1
DM					463	0.3	
NPD					406	0.2	▼0.6
BGE					250	0.1	
V-Partei³					249	0.1	
DiB					228	0.1	
ÖDP					154	0.1	
MLPD					59	0.0	0.0
DKP					47	0.0	
Informal votes		1,554			1,274		
Total valid votes		180,096			180,376		
Turnout		181,650	78.0	▲2.1			
CDU hold	Majority	12,730	7.0	▲1.2			

=== 2013 election ===
Federal election (2013): Hannover-Land I
Notes:	Blue background denotes the winner of the electorate vote. Pink background denotes a candidate elected from their party list. Yellow background denotes an electorate win by a list member, or other incumbent. A ✓ or ✗ denotes status of any incumbent, win or lose respectively.						
Party	Candidate	Votes	%	±%	Party votes	%	±%
CDU	Hendrik Hoppenstedt	77,509	44.3	▲6.1	72,286	41.3	▲7.8
SPD	✗ Caren Marks	67,440	38.5	▼0.2	57,922	33.1	▲2.5
Greens	Wolf von Nordheim	8,735	5.0	▼1.7	14,308	8.2	▼1.6
Left	Diether Dehm	6,220	3.6	▼2.9	7,931	4.5	▼2.7
AfD	Hans-Peter Wendt	5,393	3.1		7,038	4.0	
FDP	Philipp Rösler	4,504	2.6	▼5.8	8,725	5.0	▼9.1
Pirates	Walter Naumann	2,232	1.3		2,516	1.4	▼0.4
NPD	Christina Krieger	1,619	0.9	▼0.6	1,487	0.8	▼0.5
Tierschutzpartei					1,346	0.8	0.0
FW	Gerriet Kohls	1,109	0.6		937	0.5	
BIG	Üsler Ünsal	252	0.1				
PBC					213	0.1	
PRO					210	0.1	
REP					185	0.1	
MLPD					37	0.0	0.0
Informal votes		1,658			1,530		
Total valid votes		175,013			175,141		
Turnout		176,671	75.8	▲0.2			
CDU gain from SPD	Majority	10,069	5.8				

=== 2009 election ===
Federal election (2009): Hannover-Land I
Notes:	Blue background denotes the winner of the electorate vote. Pink background denotes a candidate elected from their party list. Yellow background denotes an electorate win by a list member, or other incumbent. A ✓ or ✗ denotes status of any incumbent, win or lose respectively.						
Party	Candidate	Votes	%	±%	Party votes	%	±%
SPD	✓ Caren Marks	67,178	38.7	▼11.2	53,236	30.6	▼14.0
CDU	Sebastian Lechner	66,311	38.2	0.0	58,219	33.5	▲1.0
FDP	Thomas Iseke	14,560	8.4	▲4.1	24,492	14.1	▲4.3
Greens	Detlef Knauer	11,642	6.7	▲3.4	16,993	9.8	▲2.7
Left	Brigitta Runge	11,173	6.4	▲3.5	12,601	7.2	▲3.7
Pirates					3,137	1.8	
NPD	Andreas Büschleb	2,642	1.5	▲0.2	2,288	1.3	▲0.1
Tierschutzpartei					1,362	0.8	▲0.2
RRP					1,139	0.7	
ÖDP					301	0.2	
DVU					179	0.1	
MLPD					46	0.0	0.0
Informal votes		2,251			1,764		
Total valid votes		173,506			173,993		
Turnout		175,757	75.7	▼5.6			
SPD hold	Majority	867	0.5	▼11.2			

=== 2005 election ===
Federal election (2005):Hannover-Land I
Notes:	Blue background denotes the winner of the electorate vote. Pink background denotes a candidate elected from their party list. Yellow background denotes an electorate win by a list member, or other incumbent. A ✓ or ✗ denotes status of any incumbent, win or lose respectively.						
Party	Candidate	Votes	%	±%	Party votes	%	±%
SPD	✓ Caren Marks	92,505	49.9	▼2.8	82,786	44.6	▼5.2
CDU	Monika Brüning	70,840	38.2	▲2.5	60,292	32.5	▼0.4
FDP	Thea Dückert	7,931	4.3	▼0.8	18,205	9.8	▲2.5
Greens	Fabian Peters	6,100	3.3	▼0.7	13,112	7.1	▲0.4
Left	Maren Kaminski	5,466	2.9	▲2.1	6,554	3.5	▲2.7
NPD	Christian Horn	2,501	1.3		2,297	1.2	▲1.1
Tierschutzpartei					991	0.5	▲0.2
GRAUEN					714	0.4	▲0.2
PBC					442	0.2	0.0
Pro German Center – Pro D-Mark Initiative					154	0.1	
MLPD					87	0.0	0.0
BüSo					57	0.0	
Informal votes		2,382			2,034		
Total valid votes		185,343			185,691		
Turnout		187,725	81.2	▼1.6			
SPD hold	Majority	21,665	11.7				
