= Messeschnellweg =

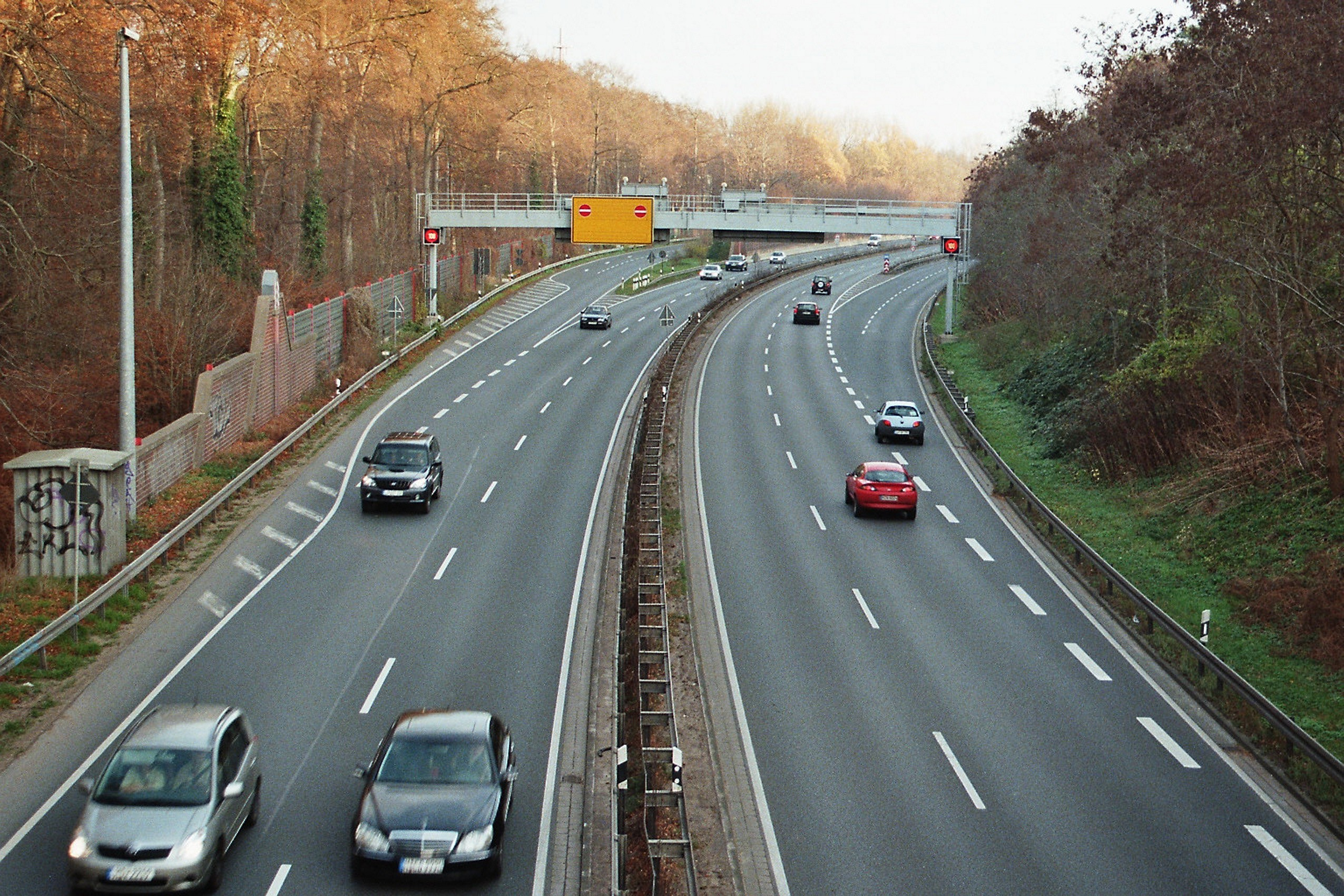
The Messeschnellweg in Hannover

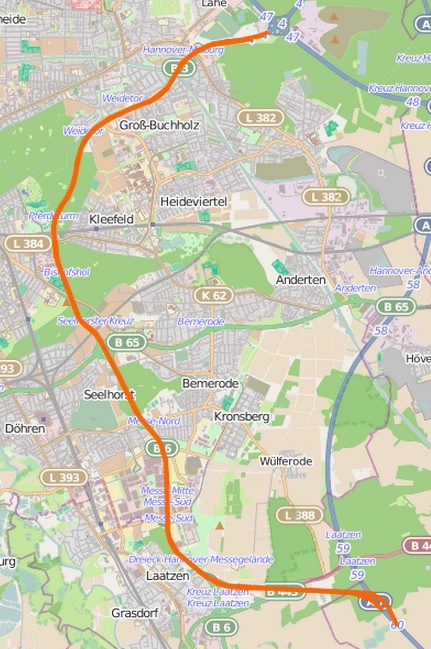
Map of Messeschnellweg

The Messeschnellweg is a four-lane motor road in Hanover. It connects the two sections of the A37.

== History ==
The Messeschnellweg begins in the north in the district of Groß-Buchholz at junction 5, Hanover-Misburg, A37. It runs in a southerly direction east of the Hanover city, centre through the Eilenriede. Then it passes the eponymous exhibition centre in the district Mittelfeld (de) and ends in Laatzen-Mitte. Here it goes back into the A37 (junction 11 fairgrounds), while at the same time the B6 branches off to the south.

The preparations for the construction of the Messeschnellweg already began in 1949. Together with the Südschnellweg, the Westschnellweg and other expressways, it is part of the concept developed by the then city planner Rudolf Hillebrecht to guide long-distance traffic around the city center. The construction of the highway through the middle of the Hanover city forest Eilenriede led to violent protests in the population, which resulted finally in 1956 the city constituted the Eilenriede Advisory Board.

The expressway is developed as a four-lane motor road. It is crossing-free since 1998 (completion of the underpass at the Pferdeturmkreuzung ) and partly has a stand track. A traffic control system makes it possible to use this as an additional lane for major events. During the big trade fairs (Hannover Messe, around the turn of the millennium the Cebit, later the Agritechnica) the Messeschnellweg is regulated as a one-way street at peak times (arrival and departure, sometimes only on the busiest days), so that four lanes can be driven in one direction are.

== Integration into the Hanoverian expressway system ==
The Messeschnellweg in the north in the district of Groß-Buchholz at the junction Hannover-Misburg in the "Moorautobahn" A37, which in turn merges later at Burgdorf in the B3 in the direction of Celle . The motorway junction Hannover / Kirchhorst also reaches the A7.

In the northern section to the Seelhorst cross the Messeschnellweg is part of the B3, south of it part of the B6. At the Seelhorst cross crosses the Südschnellweg and thus the B65.

South of the fairgrounds at the city limits with Laatzen the Messeschnellweg goes back to the A37. At the junction Hannover-Messegelände the B6 branches off to the south, which shortly afterwards crosses the B443. The A37 leads in the interchange Hannover-Süd on the A7.
