= Heeßel =

- Ortsteil of Burgdorf
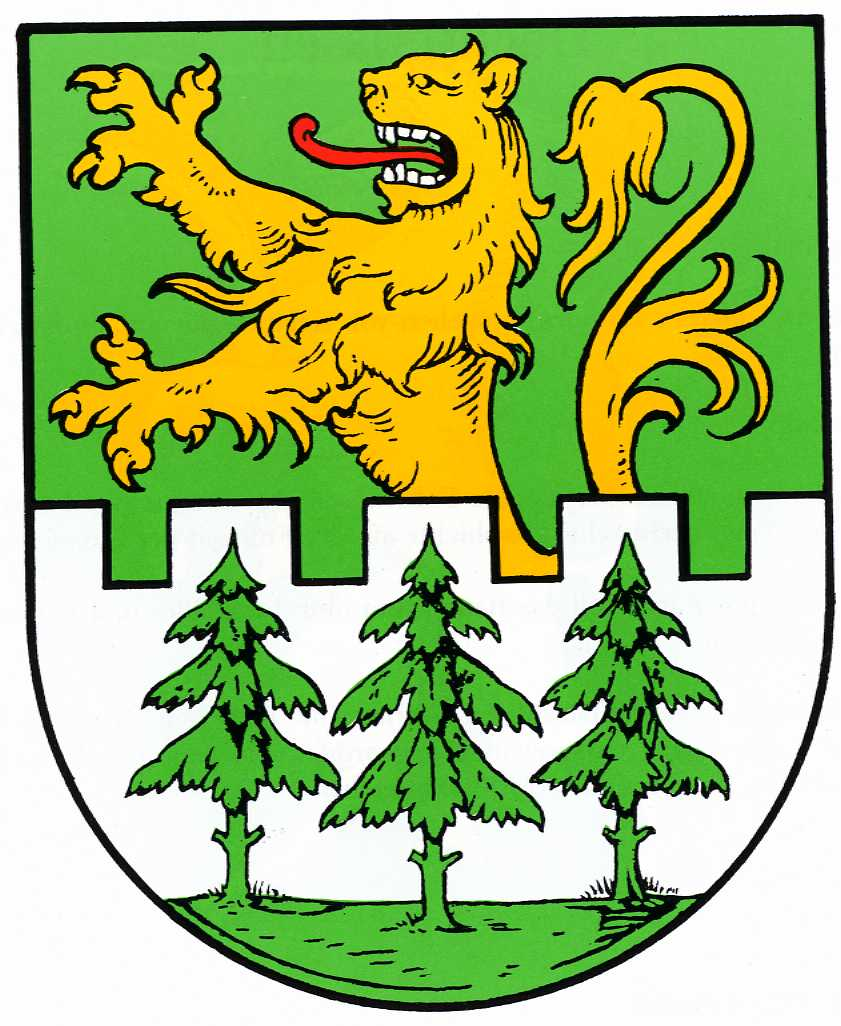
- Coat of arms
- Interactive map of Heeßel
- Location within Germany Location within Lower Saxony
- Coordinates: 52°26′39″N 09°58′46″E
- Country: Germany
- State: Lower Saxony
- District: Hanover
- Town: Burgdorf
- Elevation: 57 m (187 ft)

Population (2016)
  - Total: 1,031
- Time zone: UTC+01:00 (CET)
  - Summer (DST): UTC+02:00 (CEST)
- Postal codes: 31303
- Dialling codes: 05136

Heeßel is a borough of Burgdorf in the district of Hanover in Lower Saxony (Germany). The village has got a population of approximately 1,000 citizens and is located on the former B 188 (now K 112). It is about 2 kilometres west of the centre of Burgdorf and 3 kilometres east of Beinhorn.

== Geography ==
From now on, Heeßel is located on the former K 112, since the circuitous route of Burgdorf (new B 188) has been finished in October 2009. The stretch of the road that transits Heeßel is part of the Niedersächsische Spargelstraße ("Lower Saxon Asparagus Road"), that also crosses Burgdorf. The village is located approximately 1 kilometre along the road, that is called Dorfstraße and merges eastward into the Marktstraße of Burgdorf, and between 200 and 500 metres broad. It is surrounded by a lot of fields. In the east there is the town of Burgdorf and in the south there are some forested areas.

== Subdivision ==
The village of Heeßel can be subdivided into three commensurate sections, that are all connected by the Dorfstraße:

- The westward located Kleinheeßel ("Little Heeßel") is located a few hundred metres away from the remaining part of Heeßel. It involves the sports ground of the Heeßeler SV, a cemetery and a few residential houses. In the centre there is the bus stop "Heeßel/Kolshorner Weg".
- The largest part of the village (Westheeßel/"West Heeßel") involves apart from some residential houses also some farms. In the village centre is a turn-off from the Dorfstraße to the Burgweg, which leads to the area of the former Burg Heeßel ("Castle of Heeßel"). At the turn-off there are also a restaurant and the bus stop "Heeßel/Mitte" ("Heeßel/Centre").
- In Ostheeßel ("East Heeßel"), the part which borders on the west part of Burgdorf, is the building of the volunteer fire brigade of Heeßel. More eastward are 150 metres away from each other two gas stations. Here are also located some residential houses and farms.

The administrative area of Heeßel also concludes big farms, that got many times over the size of the village itself.

== History ==
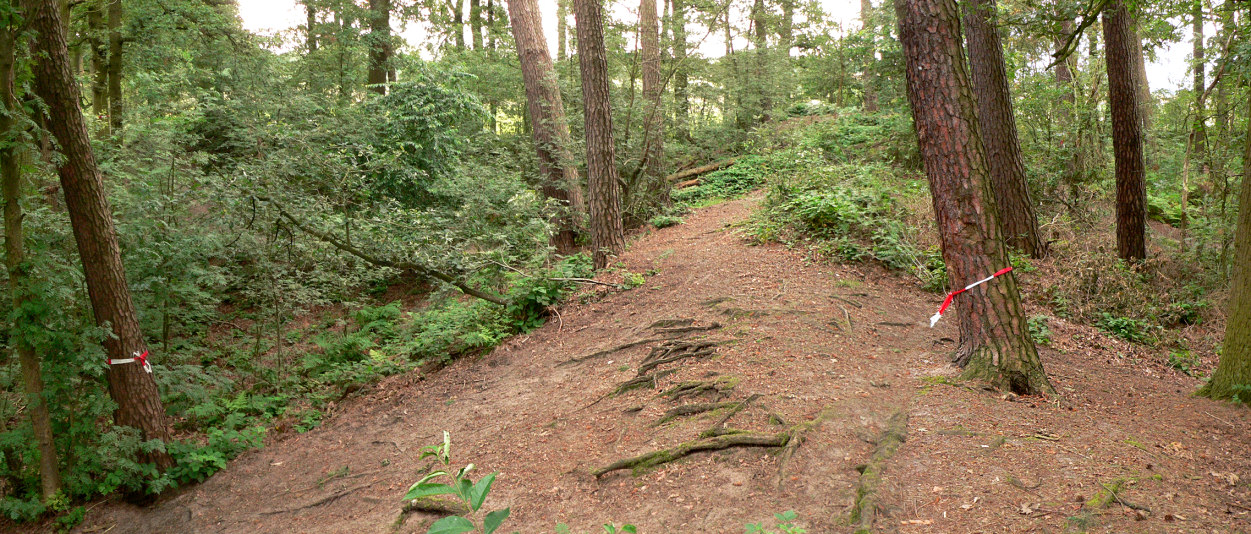
Wall of the Burg Heeßel, wooded now

According to Thietmar von Merseburg, in 983 the greats of the Saxons met with Henry II, Duke of Bavaria at the Burg Heeßel after they have had a fight. Once again in 990 here met important personalities of the Saxons to determine the borders of the Bishoprics Minden (Enger) and Hildesheim (Eastphalia). As of today the first documented mention of the village is 1360 in the Lüneburger Lehnsregister of the dukes Otto II. of Brunswick-Lüneburg and Wilhelm of Lüneburg. Around the year 1800 Heeßel contained about 150 inhabitants. The village's population soared after the end of World War II in 1945, when the number of inhabitants doubled by the immigration of displaced persons. 1974 Heeßel was integrated in the town of Burgdorf and lost its sovereignty this way.

== Politics ==
Municipal administrator of Heeßel is Hans-Jürgen Staringer. Political eliminations are generally conducted in the fire station in the village's centre.

== Transport connection ==
Heeßel is connected to Burgdorf in the east and the Bundesautobahn 37 in the west via the old Bundesstraße 188 (now K 112). Through the village there run two bus lines from the station of Burgdorf to Schillerslage respectively Altwarmbüchen, where is a connection with the line 3 of the Hanover Stadtbahn.

== Coat of arms ==
The coat of arms of Heeßel shows a golden lion in front of a silver battlement on a green background. In front of it there are three green conifers. At this the battlement is an advice to the Burg Heeßel.
