= Wietze (Aller) =

River in Germany

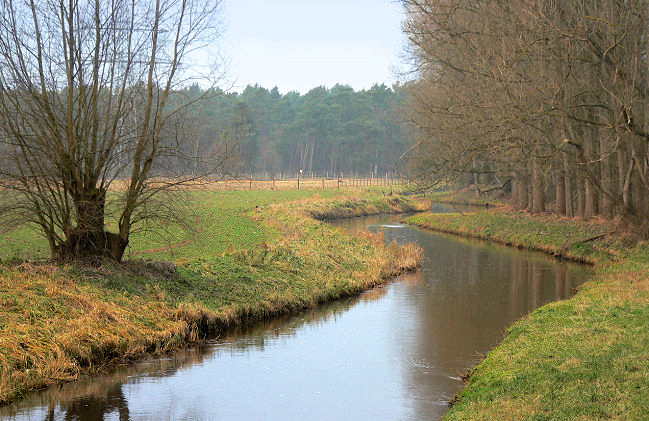
- The Wietze after 20 km, between Mellendorf (a district of Wedemark) and Fuhrberg (a district of Burgwedel)

Location
- Country: Germany
- State: Lower Saxony
- Reference no.: 4872

Physical characteristics
- Source
  - location: Source: north east of Altwarmbüchen (a district of Isernhagen), at confluence of Flöth and Edder
  - coordinates: 52°26′47″N 9°51′59″E
  - elevation: 56 m (Flöth 60 m above NN, Eder 59 m above NN)
- Mouth
  - location: north west of Wietze into the Aller
  - coordinates: 52°39′54″N 9°48′22″E
  - elevation: 28 m
- Length: 41.0 km (25.5 mi)
- Basin size: 514 km^{2} (198 sq mi)

Basin features
- Progression: Aller→ Weser→ North Sea
- Landmarks: Large towns: Langenhagen; Small towns: Isernhagen; Villages: Wietzesiedlung, Wieckenberg, Wietze-Steinförde, Wietze
- Tributaries
  - left: Laher Graben, Johannisgraben (Mühlengraben),
  - right: Wiesenbach, Hengstbeeke, Wulbeck, Rixförder Graben, Fuhrengraben

Wietze (German pronunciation: [ˈviːtsə]) is a river of Lower Saxony, Germany, a tributary of the Aller. Its total length including its source river Edder (length 3.4 km (2.1 mi)) is 41.0 km (25.5 mi).

== Geography ==
The river begins at the confluence of the Edder and Flöth northeast of Hanover near Altwarmbüchen, a district of Isernhagen. From there it flows several kilometres to the west through the southern part of Isernhagen to Langenhagen and from there on only in a northern direction to just beyond the village of Wietze, where it merges with the River Aller flowing from the south.

In the second half of its course the Wietze forms a pronounced depression with a bog-like region known as the Wietzenbruch. This is a region of extensive forest and fen woodland (Bruchwald) about 400 square kilometres (150 sq mi) in area. Wietzenbruch, a suburb of the town of Celle lies next to it.

The name of the river is derived from wizene ("wych elm river").

== See also ==
- List of rivers of Lower Saxony
