= Friedhoff =

Friedhoff is a surname. Notable people with the surname include:

- Dietmar Friedhoff (born 1966), German politician
- Paul Friedhoff (1943–2015), German politician
