= Kleinburgwedel =

Village in Saxony

Coordinates: 52°30′35″N 9°52′35″E

Kleinburgwedel (German pronunciation: [ˈklaɪnbʊʁkˌveːdl̩], lit. 'Little Burgwedel', in contrast to "Big Burgwedel"; Low German: Littjen Borwee) is a village and northeastern lying district of the city Burgwedel in the region Hannover in Lower Saxony.

== History ==
In the Middle Ages Kleinburgwedel, together with Großburgwedel, Oldhorst, Neuwarmbüchen and Fuhrberg, formed the Burgwedel parish. Despite the many war costs, Duke Wilhelm found means to buy goods. On January 6, 1361, he and Duke Ludwig von Aschwin von Alten acquired many yards and lodges at Kleinburgwedel, Thönse, Wettmar, Engensen, Schillerslage, Burgdorf, Sorgensen, Weferlingsen and Aligse with all accessories, except those pieces which Aschwin von Alten had borrowed and reserved for sale. Only the goods to Kleinburgwedel had Aschwin owned by the Duke Wilhelm zu Lehn; From the rest he vowed to grant him and Duke Ludwig the fief.

The church books are preserved from 1661. They show an average population growth of 1.5%, which only slightly decreased in 1830.

Due to its location on the southern edge of the Lüneburg Heath, bees are kept in Kleinburgwedel until today. Between 1589 and 1900, between 70 and about 150 peoples were regularly placed in straw baskets. Since the mid-20th century, the number of bee colonies is subject to strong fluctuations.

On August 28, 1808, a big fire disaster occurred in Kleinburgwedel. In a single night, eleven residential buildings and 16 outbuildings burned down.

The Second World War did not affect Kleinburgwedel at first. In the immediate vicinity was a small barracks camp for Soviet prisoners of war. The actual war action reached the village, as English bomber units flew large attacks on Hanover in October 1943. On October 9, a British Halifax crashed into the meadows after heavy hits west of Kleinburgwedel. On 18 October, a major bomber group threw incendiary bombs on the village, which was actually intended for Hannover because of poor visibility. It burned down 40 buildings; a large number of others were seriously damaged.

On March 1, 1974 Kleinburgwedel was incorporated into the new community Burgwedel.

== Politics ==
=== Community council ===
The local council of Kleinburgwedel consists of five councilors, currently held by:

- CDU: 3 seats
- SPD: 1 seat
- Greens: 1 seat

=== Mayor ===
The mayor is Jürgen Schodder (CDU). His deputy is Friedhelm Leisenberg (CDU).

=== Coat of Arms ===
The design of the coat of arms of Kleinburgwedel comes from the heraldic and coat of arms artist Gustav Völker, born in Isernhagen and later living in Hanover, who had already designed the coats of arms of Großburgwedel, Mellendorf, Wunstorf and many other localities. The approval of the coat of arms was granted by the district president in Lüneburg on December 9, 1959.

Blazon: "In silver in front of a high, five-pinned, red wall, a stylized, silver oak, growing from the middle of five stones. In the green Schildfuß a lying, silver Wolfsangel. "

Crest reason: The red wall reminds that in former times a castle was present in Kleinburgwedel, which was destroyed 1521 in the Hildesheimer pin feud. The remains of the castle wall with thirteen large boulders and strong oaks have been preserved until 1870. Therefore, the stones and the oak tree were added to the coat of arms. The Wolfsangel symbolizes the belonging to the district Burgdorf, which also leads this sign in his coat of arms.

== Culture and sights ==
=== Green Areas ===
In the district is the progressively running and 2014 largely dry fallen Würmsee. A larger area was covered with water at the beginning of 2016. It was probably created in the 19th century from a peat sting and reached an area in the order of ten hectares. Already in the empire the Hanoverians used it as a destination for excursions. Townspeople built a number of weekend cottages on the banks, which were used to house refugees after 1945 and were expanded into a larger settlement. The boat rental was discontinued a few years ago.
