= Rebecca Schamber =

German politician (born 1975)

- Schamber in 2021

Member of the Bundestag; for Hannover-Land I
- In office 26 October 2021 – 25 March 2025
- Preceded by: Hendrik Hoppenstedt
- Succeeded by: Hendrik Hoppenstedt

Personal details
- Born: 7 December 1975 (age 50) Esperke, West Germany
- Party: Social Democratic
- Children: 2
- Education: University of Bremen; Leibniz University Hannover

Rebecca Schamber (born 7 December 1975) is a German politician of the Social Democratic Party (SPD) who served as a member of the Bundestag from 2021 to 2025.

== Political career ==
Schamber became a member of the Bundestag in the 2021 elections, representing the Hannover-Land I district. In parliament, she has since been serving on the Defence Committee, the Committee on Economic Cooperation and Development, and the Subcommittee on the United Nations, International Organizations and Civil Crisis Prevention.

In addition to her committee assignments, Schamber has been an alternate member of the German delegation to the NATO Parliamentary Assembly since 2022.

In February 2025, Schamber lost her district Hannover-Land I and is no longer a member in Bundestag since 25 March 2025.

== Other activities ==
- German Network against Neglected Tropical Diseases (DNTDs), Member of the Parliamentary Advisory Board (since 2022)
- German United Services Trade Union (ver.di), Member
