= Hendrik Hoppenstedt =

German politician

Hendrik Hoppenstedt MdB
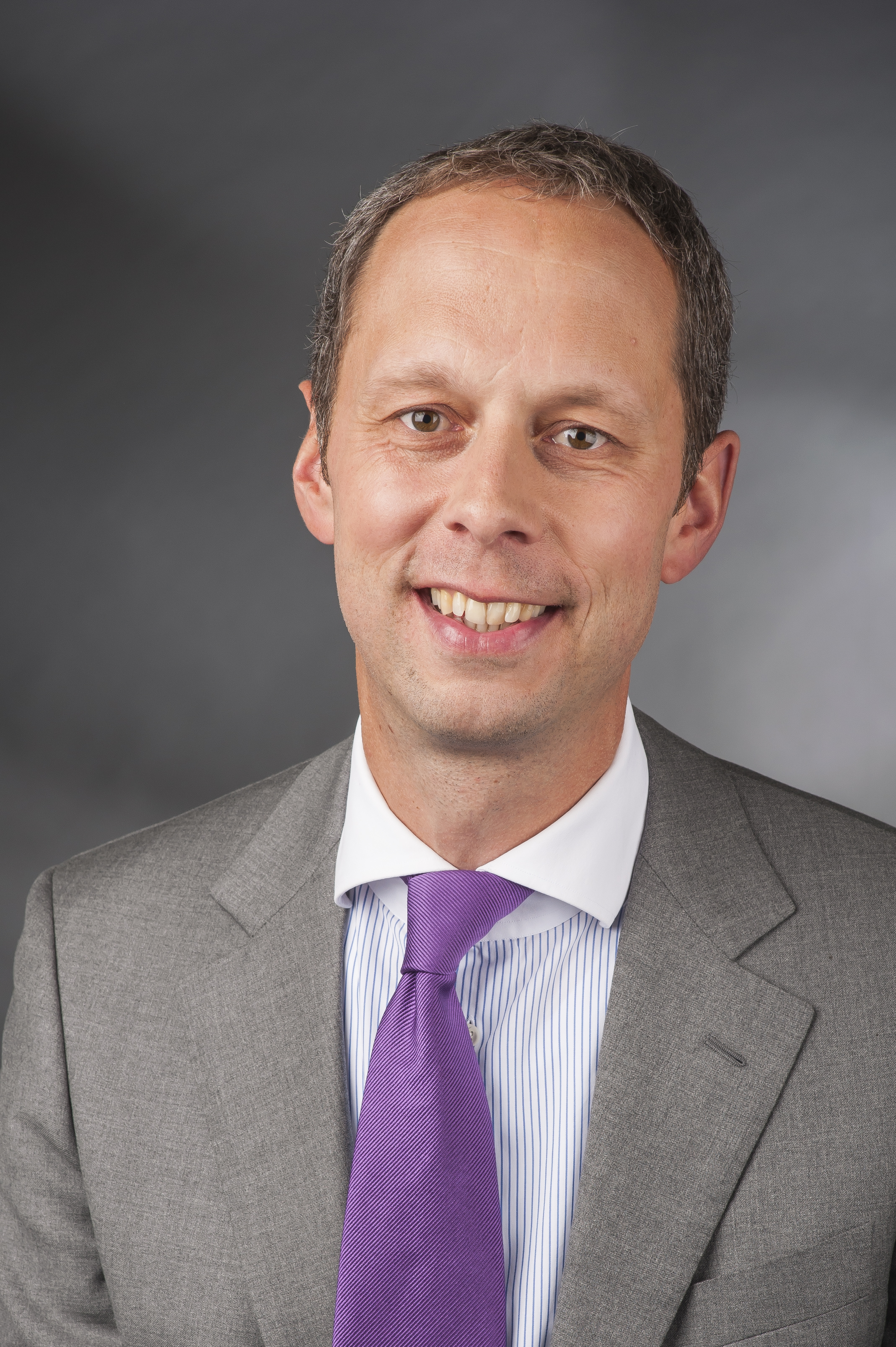
- Hoppenstedt in 2014

Minister of State for Bureaucracy Reduction and Federal-State Relations
- In office 14 March 2018 – 8 December 2021
- Chancellor: Angela Merkel
- Preceded by: Helge Braun
- Succeeded by: Sarah Ryglewski

Member of the Bundestag; from Lower Saxony
- Incumbent
- Assumed office 22 October 2013
- Preceded by: Caren Marks
- Constituency: Hannover-Land I (2013–2021); State list (2021–2025); Hannover-Land I (2025–present)

Personal details
- Born: 14 July 1972 (age 54) Großburgwedel, West Germany
- Party: Christian Democratic Union
- Children: 2
- Education: University of Passau; University of Lausanne; University of Würzburg

Hendrik Hoppenstedt (born 14 June 1972) is a German politician of the Christian Democratic Union (CDU) who has been serving as a member of the German parliament Bundestag since 2013, representing the Hannover-Land I constituency. Before he got elected in 2013, he was mayor of the city of Burgwedel in the northern German state of Lower Saxony.

== Education and early career ==
Hoppenstedt attended Gymnasium Großburgwedel and Abingdon School before studying law from 1993 until 1999. During his studies, he completed internships at the Bundesrat in Berlin and at the Embassy of Germany in Washington, D.C.

From 2002 to 2005, Hoppenstedt worked at Allianz.

== Member of the German Bundestag ==
In his first parliamentary term from 2013 until 2017, Hoppenstedt served as member of the Committee on Legal Affairs and Consumer Protection as well as on the Sub-Committee on European Union Law. Within the Committee on Legal Affairs and Consumer Protection, he was the CDU/CSU parliamentary group's rapporteur on foreign affairs and development policy. In addition, he was an alternate member of the Committee on Foreign Affairs and a full member of the Parliamentary Friendship Group for Relations with Arabic-Speaking States in the Middle East, which is in charge of maintaining inter-parliamentary relations with Bahrain, Irak, Yemen, Jordan, Qatar, Kuwait, Lebanon, Oman, Saudi Arabia, Syria, United Arab Emirates and the Palestinian territories.

In the negotiations to form a coalition government under the leadership of Chancellor Angela Merkel following the 2017 federal elections, Hoppenstedt was part of the working group on urban development, led by Bernd Althusmann, Kurt Gribl and Natascha Kohnen. In the formation of Merkel's fourth cabinet, he was appointed Minister of State for Bureaucracy Reduction and Federal-State Relations at the Federal Chancellery.

Amid the COVID-19 pandemic in Germany, Hoppenstedt co-chaired – alongside Silvia Breher, Tobias Hans, Yvonne Magwas and Paul Ziemiak – the CDU's first ever digital national convention in 2021. For the 2021 elections, he was elected to lead the CDU campaign in Lower Saxony.

In the negotiations to form a Grand Coalition under the leadership of Friedrich Merz's Christian Democrats (CDU together with the Bavarian CSU) and the Social Democrats (SPD) following the 2025 German elections, Hoppenstedt was part of the CDU/CSU delegation in the working group on government reform and cutting red tape, chaired by Philipp Amthor, Daniela Ludwig and Sonja Eichwede.

== Other activities ==
- Sparkasse Hannover, Member of the supervisory board (since 2011)
- BHW, Ombudsman (since 2016)

== Political positions ==
In June 2017, Hoppenstedt voted against his parliamentary group's majority and in favor of Germany's introduction of same-sex marriage.
