= Wietzenbruch =

- Stadtteil of Celle
- Interactive map of Wietzenbruch
- Location within Germany Location within Lower Saxony
- Coordinates: 52°35′54″N 10°00′31″E
- Country: Germany
- State: Lower Saxony
- District: Celle
- Town: Celle
- Elevation: 38 m (125 ft)

Population (2020-12-31)
  - Total: 4,811
- Time zone: UTC+01:00 (CET)
  - Summer (DST): UTC+02:00 (CEST)
- Postal codes: 29225
- Dialling codes: 05141

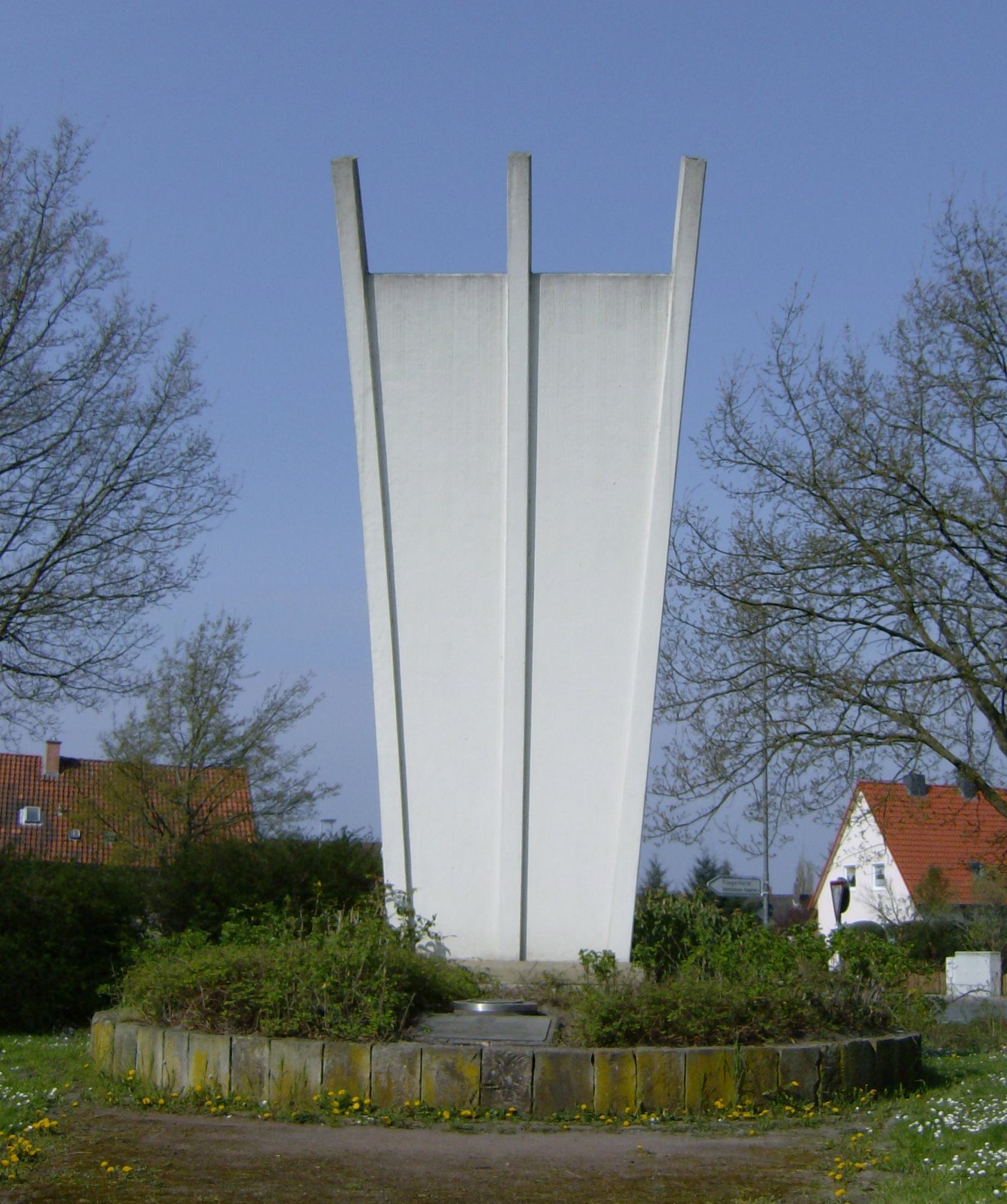
The Berlin airlift memorial in Wietzenbruch

Wietzenbruch is a suburb in the southwest of the Lower Saxon town of Celle, which was named after the fen wood (Bruchwald) bisected by the river Wietze. Originally, the centre of Wietzenbruch was a small estate farm (V. Anderten).

== Incorporation into Celle ==
Since 1974, Wietzenbruch has belonged entirely to the town of Celle (previously only part of it had been incorporated) and has become a popular housing development area.

== Points of interest ==
The Wietzenbruch is also a description for the adjacent bog-like area in the direction of Großburgwedel. It was through this region that the first high-speed line for trial and record-breaking runs by railway locomotives was built during the 1920s. The track is also known as the Hare Railway (Hasenbahn) in the common parlance; a reference to its long construction time (1913–1938). Today, it forms part of the Hanover–Hamburg railway.

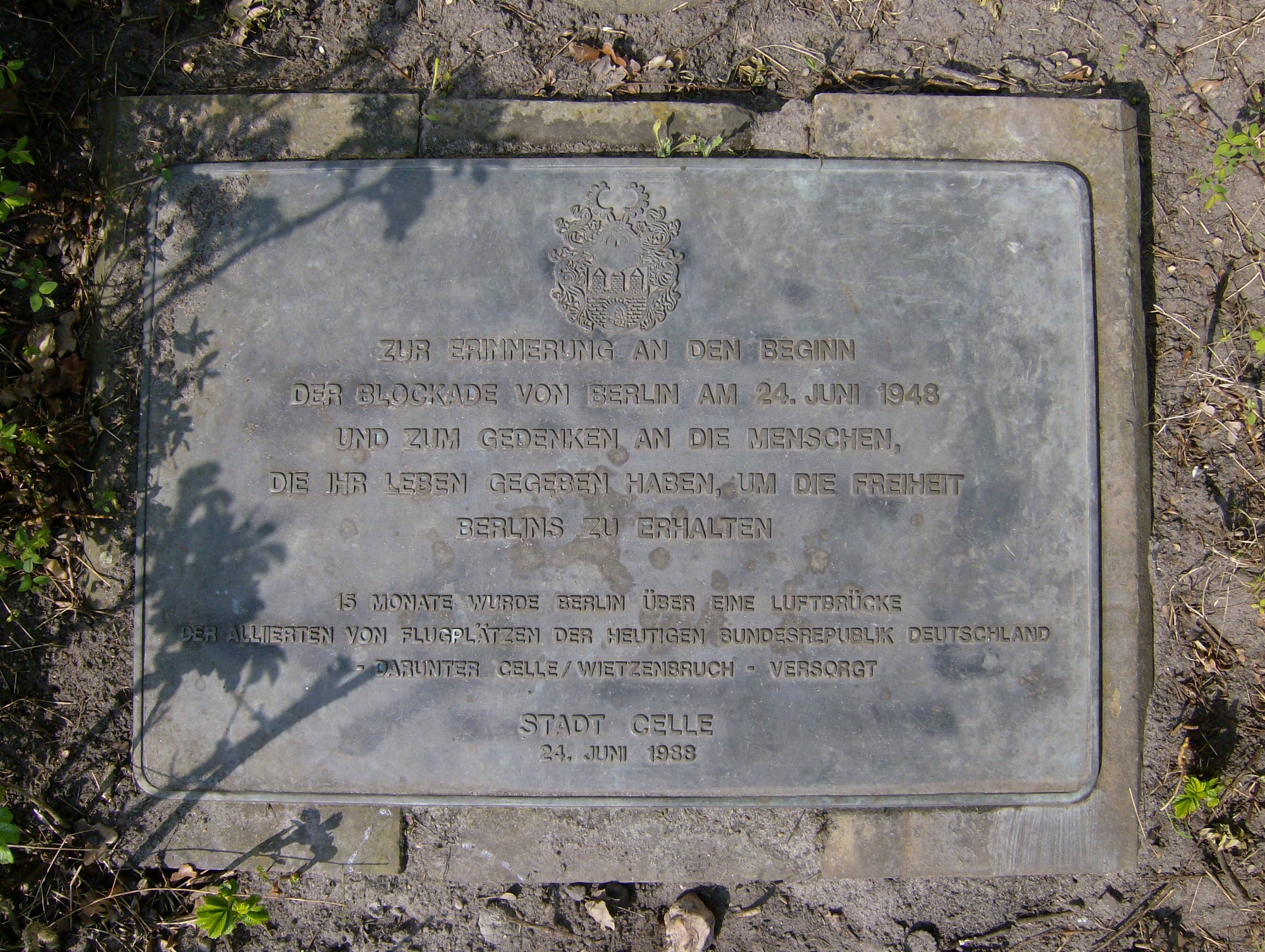
Memorial tablet at the foot of the airlift monument

The Army aviation airfield (Heeresflugplatz Celle or Immelmann-Kaserne) in Celle-Wietzenbruch gained renown in the 1940s as one of the departure airfields for supply aircraft during the Berlin Airlift. This event is commemorated by the Airbridge Memorial at the entrance to the site initiated in 1985 by the then Celle town councillor, Karl Duffner, and opened in 1988. Today, the aerodrome is the location for the Bundeswehr's Army Aviation Training Centre C, as well as the 100th Aviation Reconnaissance Squadron (Heeresfliegerverbindungs- und Aufklärungsstaffel 100).

== Politics ==
The head of the village council (Ortsbürgermeister) is Dr. Walter Jochim (CDU).
