= Isernhagen =

Municipality in Lower Saxony, Germany

- Municipality
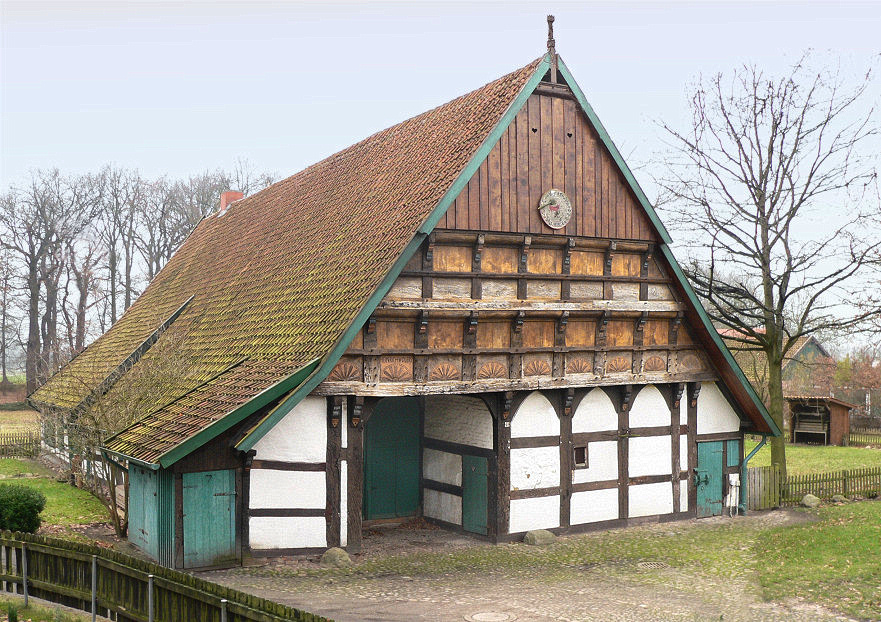
- Wöhler-Dusche-Hof, an agriculture-museum

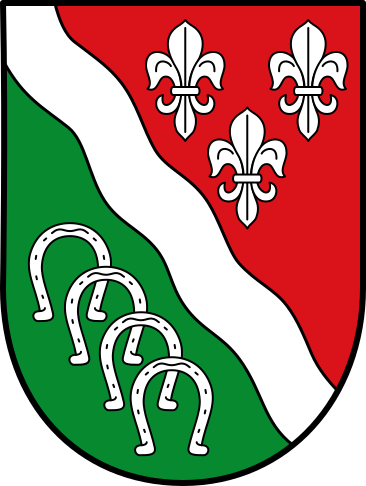
- Coat of arms

- Location of Isernhagen within Hanover district
- Interactive map of Isernhagen
- Location within Germany Location within Lower Saxony
- Coordinates: 52°26′03″N 09°51′26″E
- Country: Germany
- State: Lower Saxony
- District: Hanover
- Subdivisions: 7 districts

Government
  - Mayor (2021–26): Tim Mithöfer (CDU)

Area
  - Total: 59.85 km^{2} (23.11 sq mi)
- Elevation: 58 m (190 ft)

Population (2025-12-31)
  - Total: 23,979
  - Density: 400.7/km^{2} (1,038/sq mi)
- Time zone: UTC+01:00 (CET)
  - Summer (DST): UTC+02:00 (CEST)
- Postal codes: 30916
- Dialling codes: 0511, 05136, 05139
- Vehicle registration: H
- Website: www.isernhagen.de

Isernhagen (German pronunciation: [ˈiːzɐnˌhaːɡn̩]; Eastphalian: Isernhogen) is a municipality in the district of Hanover, in Lower Saxony, Germany. It is situated in the north-east of Hanover. According to the average income per capita it is the most affluent municipality in Lower Saxony. Bundesautobahn 7 passes through the municipality. It is adjacent to Burgwedel, Burgdorf, Lehrte, Hannover, Langenhagen and Wedemark.

== Division of the municipality ==
Isernhagen consists of 7 districts:

- Niedernhägener Bauerschaft (common abbreviation: NB)
- Kircher Bauerschaft (common abbreviation: KB)
- Farster Bauernschaft (common abbreviation: FB)
- Hohenhorster Bauerschaft (common abbreviation: HB)
- Altwarmbüchen
- Neuwarmbüchen, including Gartenstadt Lohne
- Kirchhorst, including Großhorst and Stelle

Twinned with Peacehaven in East Sussex, Épinay-sous-Sénart in France, Suchy Las in Poland and Tamási in Hungary.

== History ==
=== Name ===
The first part of the name Isernhagen derives from the word Yser or Yserne which means 'iron'. In the middle ages ironstone was found in the lowlands of the river Wietze. It was smelted on-site and used as construction material. The ending Hagene or Hagen describes a piece of woodlands or fencing of crop lands, common to keep away animals from the farmland.

=== Arms ===
The coat of arms was drafted by Walter Peitschmann. It was authorized by the district of Hannover on 9 January 1987.

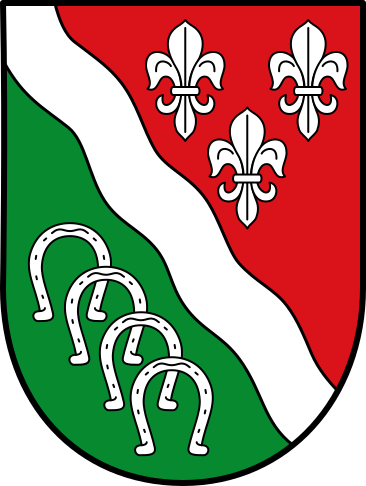

Description of coat of arms: "Separated by the silver diagonal wavy bar, top right three silver lilies on red (2:1), bottom left four silver horseshoes each other overlaying on green background."

Explanation of coat of arms: The three lilies on red in the top right half, are taken from the coat of arms of the once residential Barons of Cramm and they are symbols for the three local congregations of the former joint municipality Kirchwarmbüchen. The four Bauernschaften (peasantries), in which horse breeding was predominant, are symbolized by the four horseshoes. In between meanders the silver band of the river Wietze, which connects all villages of the joint municipality.

== Sights ==
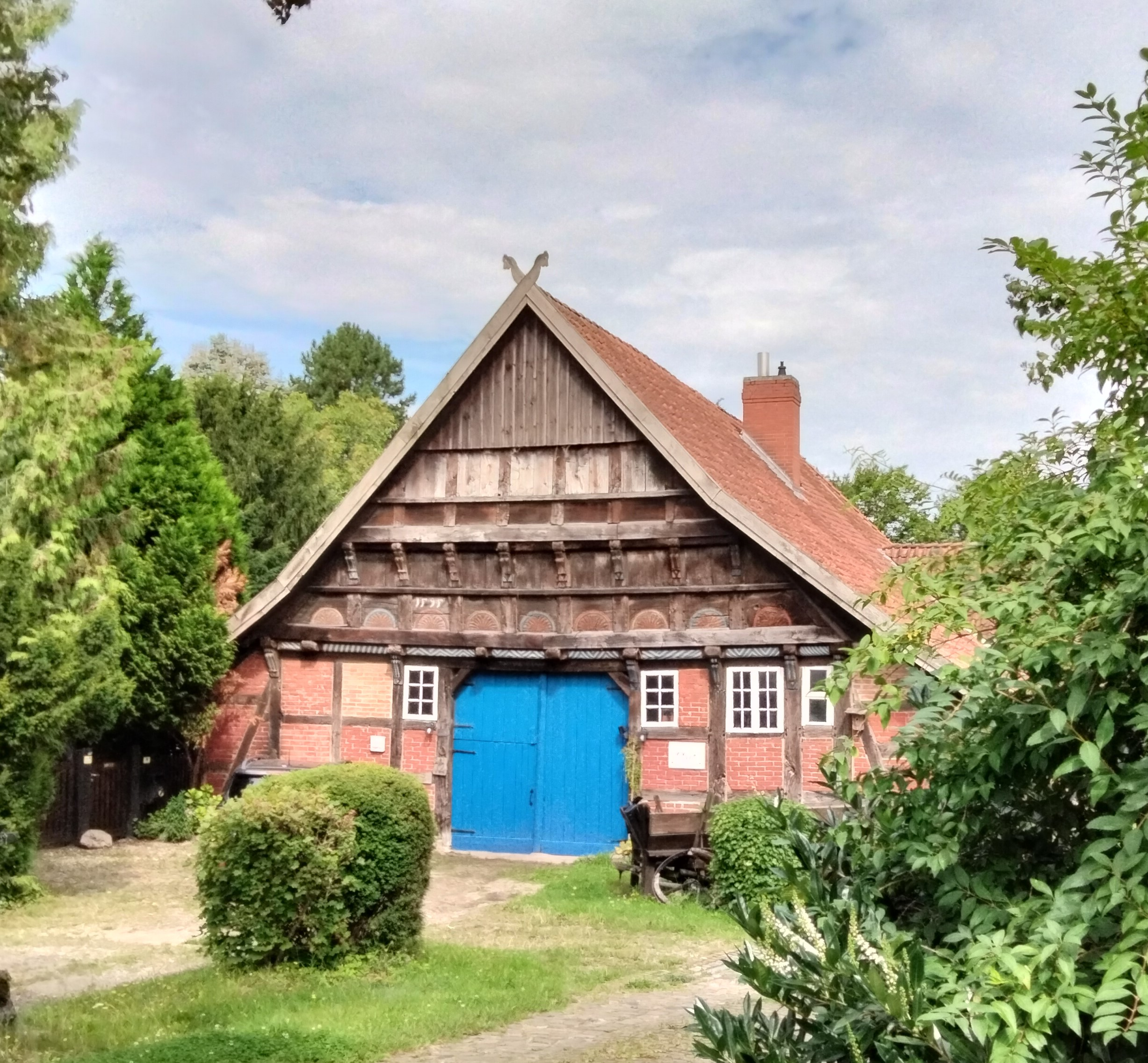
Half-timbered house dating from 1595

Various well-preserved half-timbered houses and farms can be visited in Isernhagen. House no. 72 in Hauptstraße in Farster Bauerschaft is considered to be one of the oldest buildings. It was built in 1595 in the renaissance style with wood carvings (rosettes) which show the typical design of the renaissance period.

== Twin towns – sister cities ==
Isernhagen is twinned with:

- Épinay-sous-Sénart, France
- Peacehaven, England, United Kingdom
- Suchy Las, Poland
- Tamási, Hungary
