= Meitze =

- Ortsteil of Wedemark
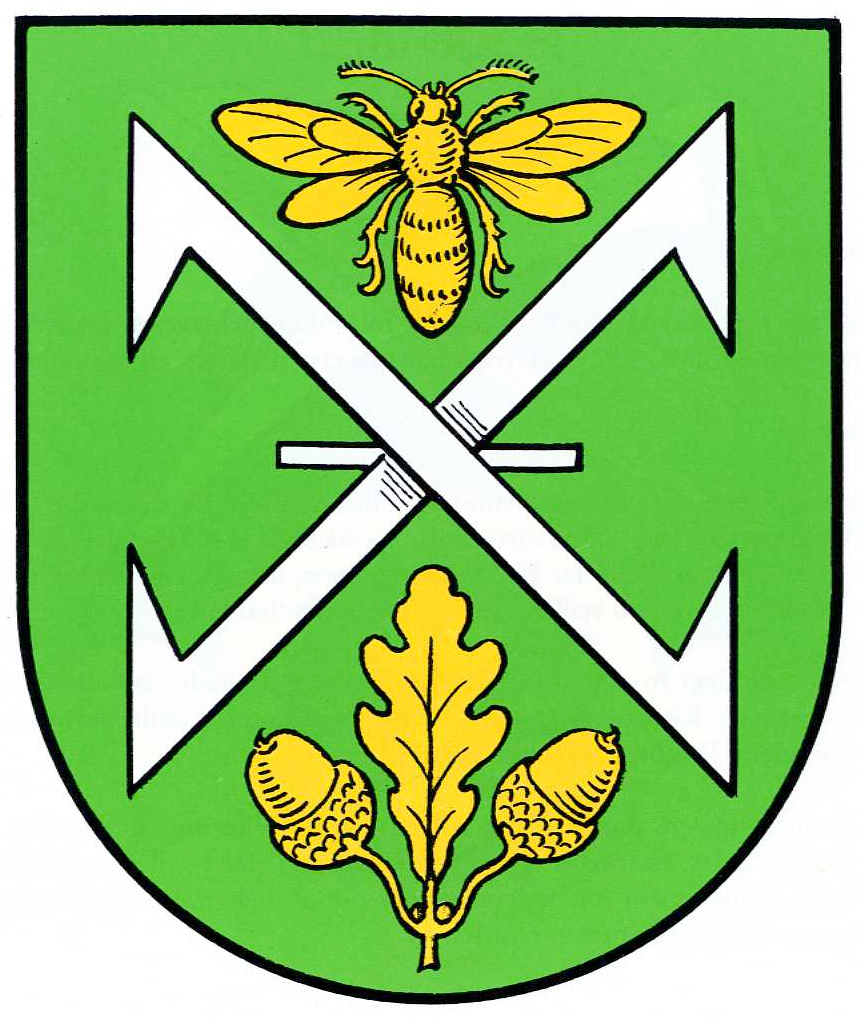
- Coat of arms
- Interactive map of Meitze
- Location within Germany Location within Lower Saxony
- Coordinates: 52°34′4″N 9°45′47″E
- Country: Germany
- State: Lower Saxony
- District: Hanover
- Town: Wedemark

Area
  - Total: 11 km^{2} (4.2 sq mi)
- Elevation: 42 m (138 ft)

Population (2019-12-31)
  - Total: 728
  - Density: 66/km^{2} (170/sq mi)
- Time zone: UTC+01:00 (CET)
  - Summer (DST): UTC+02:00 (CEST)
- Postal codes: 30900
- Dialling codes: 05130
- Vehicle registration: H

Meitze is a village in the municipality Wedemark, in Lower Saxony. Meitze covers about 11 square kilometres, including areas used for agriculture and forestry.

== General information ==
The village is mainly noted for the cobbled high street and a lot of old timber-framed houses in the centre.

In the North, there is a wind farm with twelve wind turbines.

== History ==
Meitze arose at the crossing point of two important trade routes, the "Hessenweg" and the "Bremerweg". On this intersection, Meitze developed as a well-known marketplace.

- The village was founded in 1330 as "Metce", according to documents.
- 1438 - Meitze was mentioned as "Metzenne" in a register.
- around 1791 the name of the town became "Meitze".
- 1921 - the local Schützenverein was founded
- 1930 - the volunteer fire brigade was established.
- 1959 - the new chapel was consecrated
- since 1974 Meitze has been a district of the Wedemark

On 29 April 1944, ten American airmen were killed when their Consolidated B-24 Liberator aircraft crashed near Meitze. The crew had been ordered to carry out a bombing mission over the German capital of Berlin, according to the U.S. military. Their remains were identified in 2011 and buried at Arlington National Cemetery.

== Infrastructure ==
About one kilometer (0.6 miles) away from Meitze passes the A7.

Meitze is directly connected with Mellendorf and Elze/Bennemühlen by the bus route 697.

Until 1967 Meitze also had an own elementary school, but it was closed because of a lack of students.
