= Lower Saxon Asparagus Road =

Tourist route in North Germany

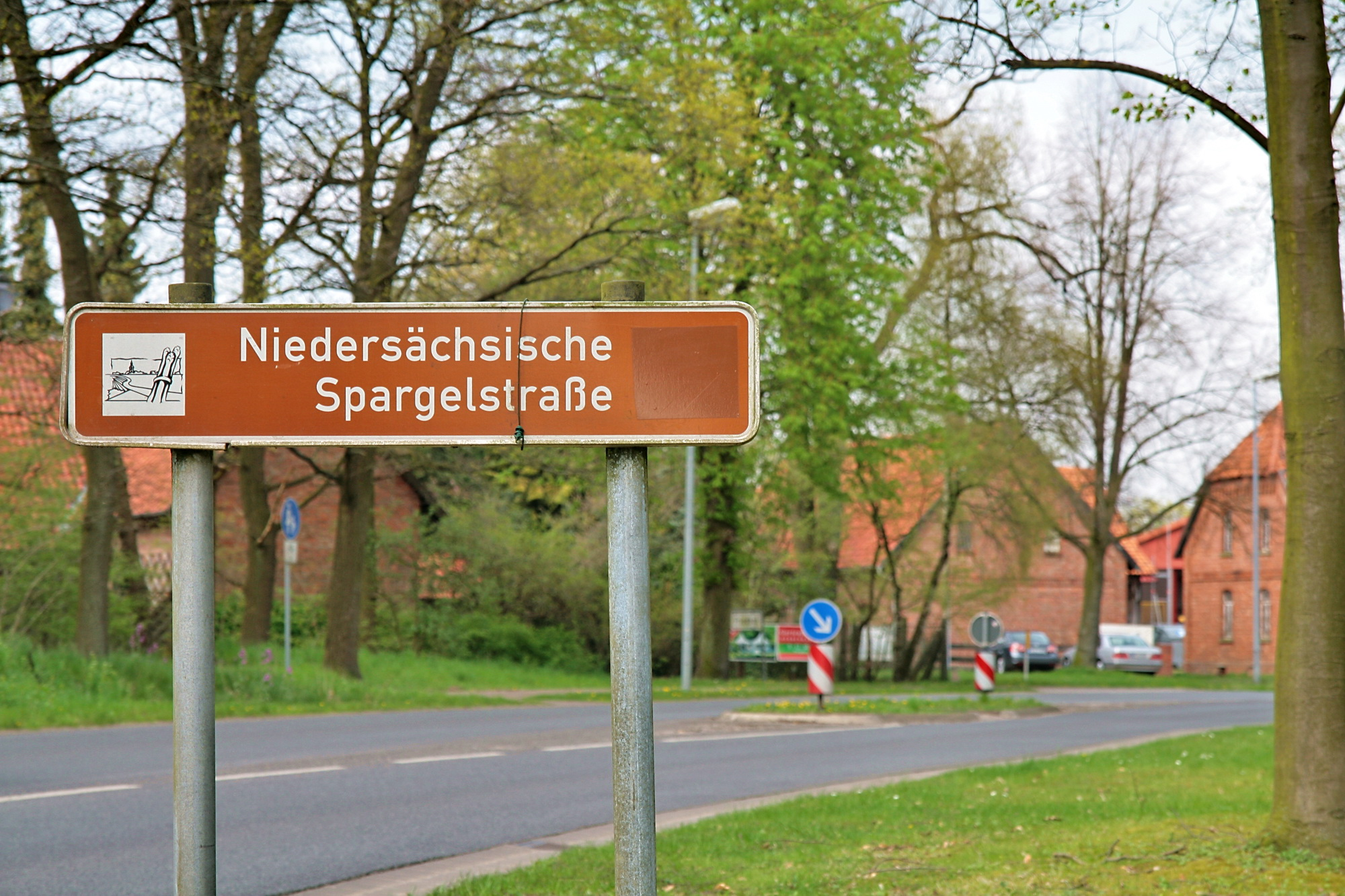
Sign for the Lower Saxon Asparagus Road just before the village of Ramlingen / Burgdorf

The Lower Saxon Asparagus Road (German: Niedersächsische Spargelstraße) is a tourist route in North Germany that confers recognition of the asparagus as a delicacy in the region. The vegetable is grown in the areas between Brunswick and Lüneburg, between Bremen, Cloppenburg and Vechta, and from Nienburg/Weser via Hoya to Soltau.

The Asparagus Road is about 750 kilometres (470 mi) long and links the tourist regions of the Lüneburg Heath, Hanover and its environs, Brunswick Land, Middle Weser and the Oldenburg Münsterland.

It was initiated by the Lower Saxon Asparagus Road Society (Verein Niedersächsische Spargelstraße) and is the equivalent of the German Wine Road, the Lower Saxon Mill Road or the German Fairy Tale Route.

Part of the Lower Saxon Asparagus Road runs from Burgdorf via Nienburg/Weser, Bruchhausen-Vilsen and Bassum to Sulingen. Since 2005 the Lower Saxon Asparagus Museum (Niedersächsische Spargelmuseum) has been located in Nienburg.

== Other asparagus roads ==
In Baden-Württemberg (Baden Asparagus Road) and in North Rhine-Westphalia there are other asparagus roads.

== Sources ==
- Dieter Hurcks: Entlang der Niedersächsischen Spargelstraße.

== See also ==
- Straße der Megalithkultur - tourist route from Osnabrück to Oldenburg via some 33 Megalithic sites.
