= Otto Wöhler =

German general (1894–1987)

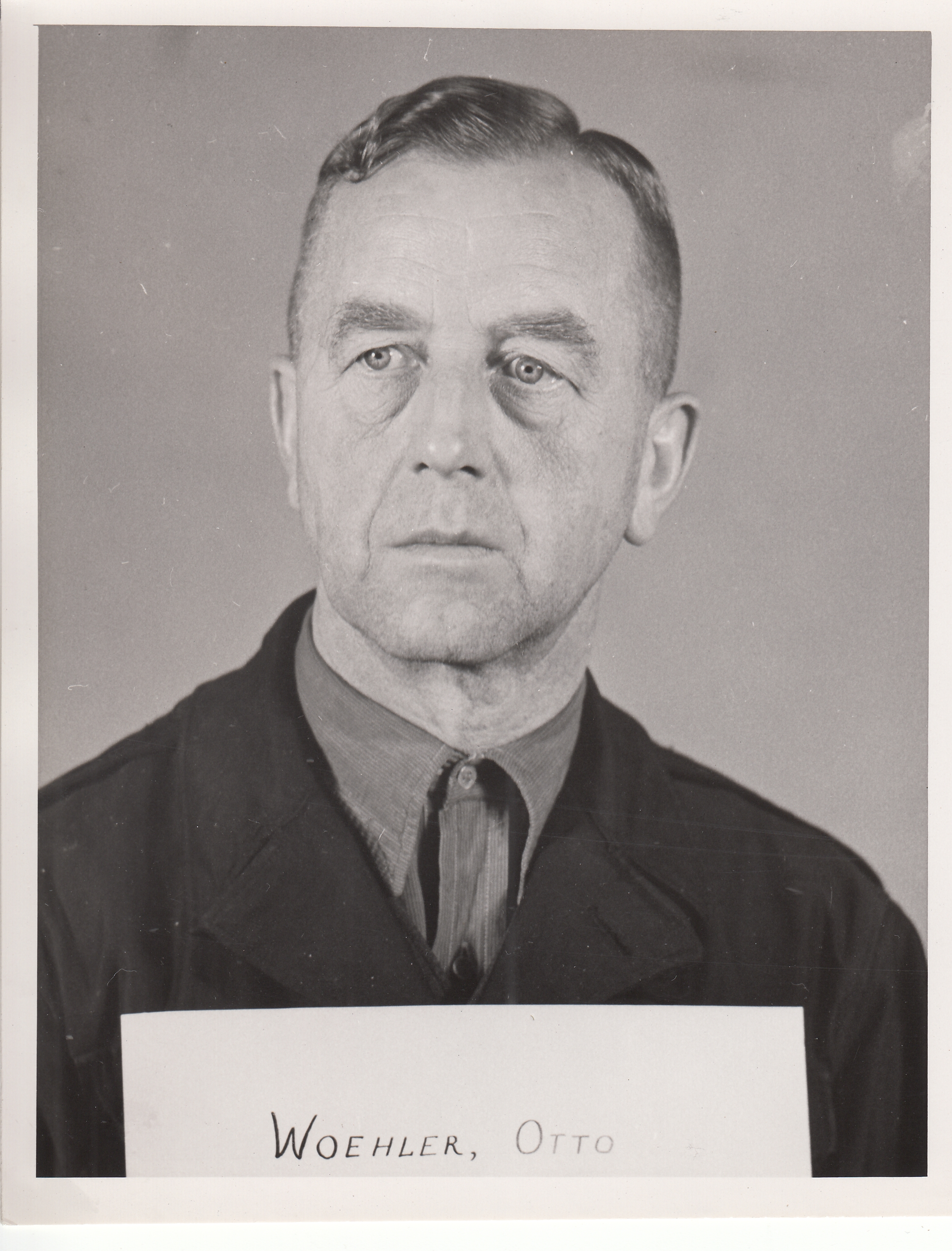
- Wöhler as a defendant in the High Command Trial, 1947-1948
- Born: 12 July 1894; Großburgwedel, German Empire
- Died: 5 February 1987 (aged 92); Großburgwedel, West Germany
- Military career
- Allegiance: German Empire; Weimar Republic; Nazi Germany
- Branch: German Army
- Service years: 1913–1945
- Rank: General der Infanterie
- Commands: I Army Corps; 8th Army; Army Group South
- Conflicts: World War I World War II
- Awards: Knight's Cross of the Iron Cross with Oak Leaves

Otto Wöhler (12 July 1894 – 5 February 1987) was a German general in the Wehrmacht during World War II. He rose to a corps and army level commander.

Wöhler was implicated in Einsatzgruppen activities while serving as Chief of Staff of the 11th Army in early 1942. After the war, he was convicted of war crimes and crimes against humanity in the High Command trial and sentenced to 8 years. He was released in February 1951.

== World War II ==
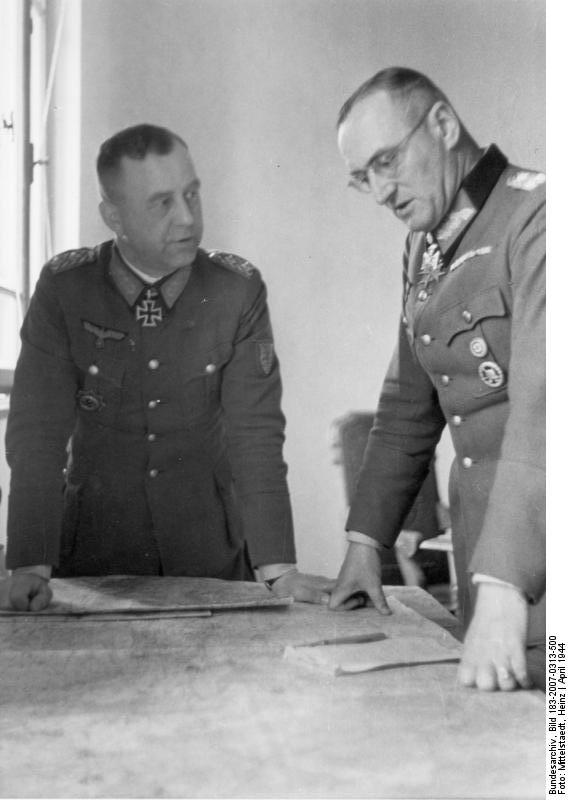
Wöhler with Generaloberst Ferdinand Schörner, April 1944

Wöhler fought in World War I and served in the post-war Reichswehr and in then the Wehrmacht in several staff roles. Between October 1940 and May 1942, Wöhler served as chief of staff of Field Marshal Erich von Manstein's 11th Army. In this capacity Wöhler cooperated closely with the Einsatzgruppe D under Otto Ohlendorf. At one point, he requested that all watches belonging to the killed Jews be turned over to the army.

Wöhler was then appointed chief of staff of Army Group Center under Field Marshal Günther von Kluge. Wöhler’s first combat command was I Army Corps which he led from February to August 1943, before being given command of the 8th Army in August 1943. In December 1944 he was appointed commander of Army Group South.

== Trial and conviction ==
Wöhler was investigated by the Allies after the war and was implicated in Einsatzgruppen activities while serving as Chief of Staff of the 11th Army in early 1942. In the pre-trial interrogations, he admitted that Manstein awarded Iron Crosses to Einsatzgruppen men and described the cooperation with the Einsatzgruppen as "generally free of friction".

He was tried by a U.S. Military Tribunal at Nuremberg ("High Command Trial" No. XII). At trial Wöhler denied knowledge of the Einsatzgruppen functions and any complicity in helping to carry their actions. He was convicted of implementing the Barbarossa Jurisdiction Order, which allowed the murder of civilians on the pretext of counteracting partisan activity Wöhler was also found guilty of deportations of civilians for slave labor and cooperation with Einsatzgruppen.

Wöhler was sentenced to eight years imprisonment in October 1948. During the 1949 sentence review, his sentence was confirmed with no changes. Based on the sentence having been backdated to 1945, he was released in February 1951 on good time credit grounds.

== Awards ==
- 1914 Iron Cross: 2nd Class (1914); 1st Class (1916)
- German Cross in Gold on 26 January 1942 as Oberst in the General Staff of AOK 11
- Knight's Cross of the Iron Cross with Oak Leaves
  - Knight's Cross on 14 August 1943 as General of the Infantry and commander of I Army Corps
  - Oak Leaves on 28 November 1944 as General of the Infantry and commander of the 8th Army

Military offices
Preceded by General der Kavallerie Philipp Kleffel	Commander of I. Armeekorps; 1 April 1943 – 15 August 1943	Succeeded by General der Kavallerie Philipp Kleffel
Preceded by General Johannes Blaskowitz	Commander of 8. Armee; 22 August 1943 – 27 December 1944	Succeeded by General Hans Kreysing
Preceded by Generaloberst Johannes Frießner	Commander of Heeresgruppe Süd; 28 December 1944 – 25 March 1945	Succeeded by Generaloberst Dr. Lothar Rendulic
