= Caren Marks =

German politician (born 1963)

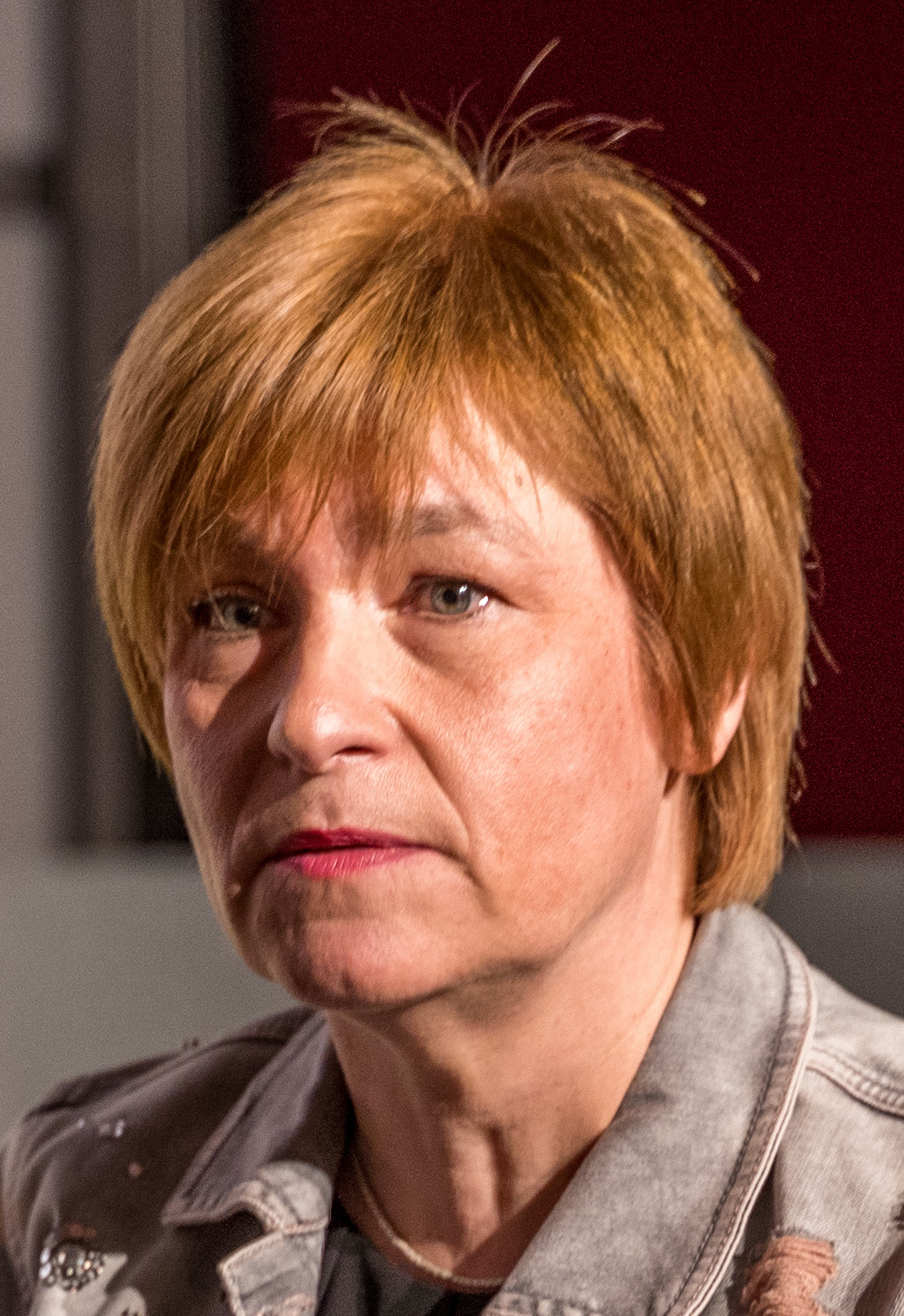
- Marks in 2019

Member of the Bundestag; from Lower Saxony
- In office 17 October 2002 – 26 October 2021
- Preceded by: Monika Ganseforth
- Succeeded by: Multi-member district
- Constituency: Hannover-Land I (2002–2013); State list (2013–2021)

Personal details
- Born: Caren Bayer; 25 September 1963 (age 63) Bad Pyrmont, West Germany
- Party: Social Democratic
- Children: 2
- Education: Leibniz University Hannover

Caren Marks (née Bayer; born 25 September 1963) is a German politician of the Social Democratic Party (SPD) who served as a member of the Bundestag from the state of Lower Saxony from 2002 until 2021. Since 2013, she has been serving as Parliamentary State Secretary at the Federal Ministry of Labour and Social Affairs in the government of Chancellor Angela Merkel.

She represented Hannover-Land I from 2002 to 2013.

== Political career ==
Marks first became a member of the Bundestag in the 2002 German federal election. She is Parliamentary State Secretary to the Federal Minister for Family Affairs, Senior Citizens, Women and Youth.

In the negotiations to form a fourth coalition government under Merkel's leadership following the 2017 federal elections, Marks was part of the working group on families, women, seniors and youth, led by Annette Widmann-Mauz, Angelika Niebler and Katarina Barley.

In July 2019, Marks announced that she would not stand in the 2021 federal elections but instead resign from active politics by the end of the parliamentary term.
