= Dietmar Friedhoff =

German politician (born 1966)

Member of the Bundestag
- Incumbent
- Assumed office 24 October 2017

Personal details
- Born: 18 June 1966 (age 59)
- Party: AfD

Dietmar Friedhoff (born 18 June 1966) is a German politician for the populist Alternative for Germany (AfD) and since 2017 member of the Bundestag.

== Life and politics ==
Friedhoff was born 1966 in the West German city of Hagen and studied electrical engineering and became a degreed engineer.

Friedhoff entered the newly founded AfD in 2013 and became member of the bundestag in 2017.

Friedhoff is considered to be part of the far right-wing of his party in his home state Lower Saxony.

Friedhoff denies the scientific consensus on climate change and polemicized against energy transition.
