= Bundesautobahn 37 =

Federal motorway in Germany

A 37
- Bundesautobahn 37

Route information
- Length: 11 km (6.8 mi)

Location
- Country: Germany
- States: Lower Saxony

Highway system
- Roads in Germany; Autobahns; List; Federal; List; State; E-roads
← A 36	→ A 38

Bundesautobahn 37 (translates from German as Federal Motorway 37, short form Autobahn 37, abbreviated as BAB 37 or A 37) is an autobahn in the Region Hannover, Germany. It consists of two parts, one connecting the borough of Hannover-Buchholz to Burgdorf via Altwarmbüchen, the other connecting the Hanover fairground to the A 7. The two parts are linked by the B 3, the whole system is known as the Messeschnellweg (fairground expressway).

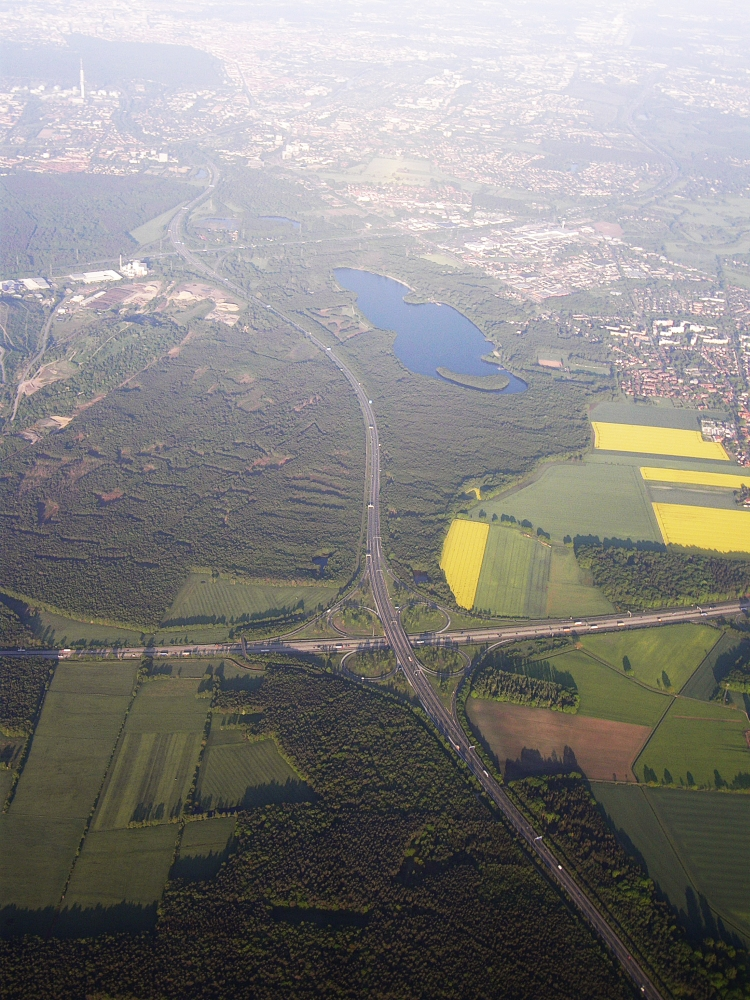
The A 37 crosses the A 2 and the A 7

During large fairs, for example CeBIT or Hannover Messe, the Messeschnellweg can be transformed to a four-lane one way road on the fly to allow for quicker travel to and from the fairground.

== Exit list ==
B 3 Celle
(2)	Burgdorf-Beinhorn
(3)	Hannover / Kirchhorst 4-way interchange A 7 E45
(4)	Hannover-Buchholz 4-way interchange A 2 E30
(5)	Hannover-Misburg
(11)	Hannover-Messegelände B 6
(12)	Hannover-Süd 3-way interchange A 7 E45
