= Großburgwedel =

- Stadtteil of Burgwedel
- Coat of arms
- Interactive map of Großburgwedel
- Location within Germany Location within Lower Saxony
- Coordinates: 52°29′32″N 09°51′18″E
- Country: Germany
- State: Lower Saxony
- District: Hanover
- Town: Burgwedel

Area
  - Total: 21.63 km^{2} (8.35 sq mi)
- Elevation: 50 m (160 ft)

Population (2020)
  - Total: 9,658
  - Density: 446.5/km^{2} (1,156/sq mi)
- Time zone: UTC+01:00 (CET)
  - Summer (DST): UTC+02:00 (CEST)
- Postal codes: 30938
- Dialling codes: 05139

Großburgwedel (German pronunciation: [ˈɡʁoːsbʊʁkˌveːdl̩], lit. 'Big Burgwedel', in contrast to "Little Burgwedel"; Low German: Groten Boorwee) is a village northeast of Hanover, Lower Saxony, Germany. Formerly an independent municipality, it is part of the town of Burgwedel since 1974. Großburgwedel is home to the town hall of Burgwedel and other town institutions such as the library, a hospital for the region of Hanover. It also has a grammar school, secondary school, secondary modern school and special needs school, as well as a builder's yard and open-air swimming pool.

== Church ==
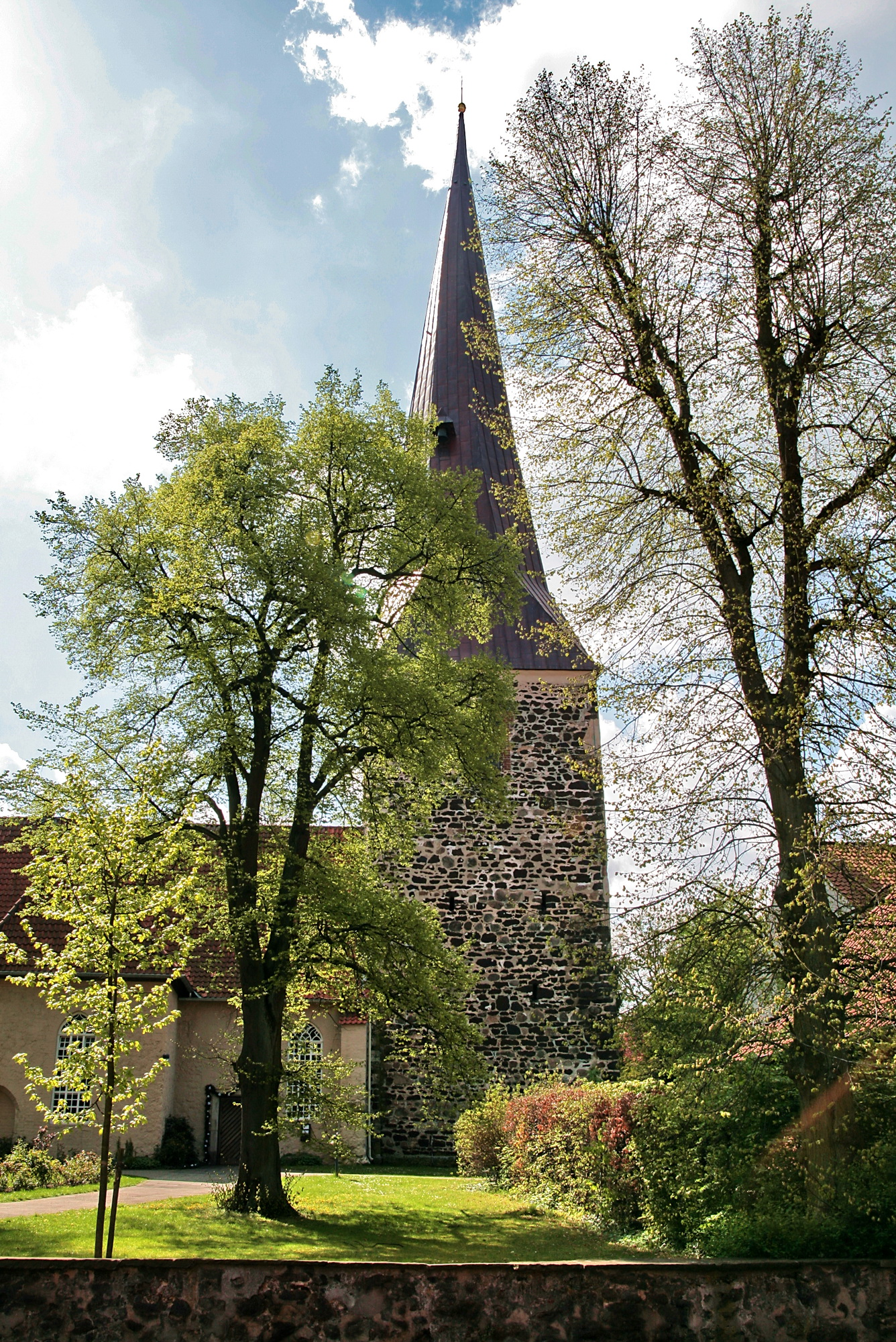
St Peters Church (Petrikirche) in Großburgwedel

In Großburgwedel is the parish of St. Peter, part of the Lutheran state church of Hanover. This supports the church itself and the parish hall as well as the vicarage and the parish gardens in Mitteldorf. In addition, Großburgwedel is the seat of the diocese of Burgdorfer Land, which is responsible for the parishes of Burgdorf and Burgwedel-Langenhagen.

== Transport ==
Großburgwedel has an autobahn junction (no. 54) on the A 7, that runs past Großburgwedel to the west. Furthermore, the village lies on the railway line from Hanover via Celle and Uelzen to Hamburg. All local trains operated by the Metronom Eisenbahngesellschaft stop at Großburgwedel station. The L 381 and L383 run through Großburgwedel. Between the L383 and L381, L381 and K113 as well as between the K113 and L383, there are ring roads.

== Economy ==
The headquarters of the chemist's chain Rossmann and the KIND Hearing Aids are located in Großburgwedel. In addition, it is home to a branch of the IKEA furniture group.

== Well-known personalities ==
- Otto Wöhler (b. 1894) was a Wehrmacht general.
- Bettina Zimmermann (b 1975), German actress
- Steve Cherundolo (b. 1979), American footballer
