= Burgdorf, Hanover =

Burgdorf
- Town
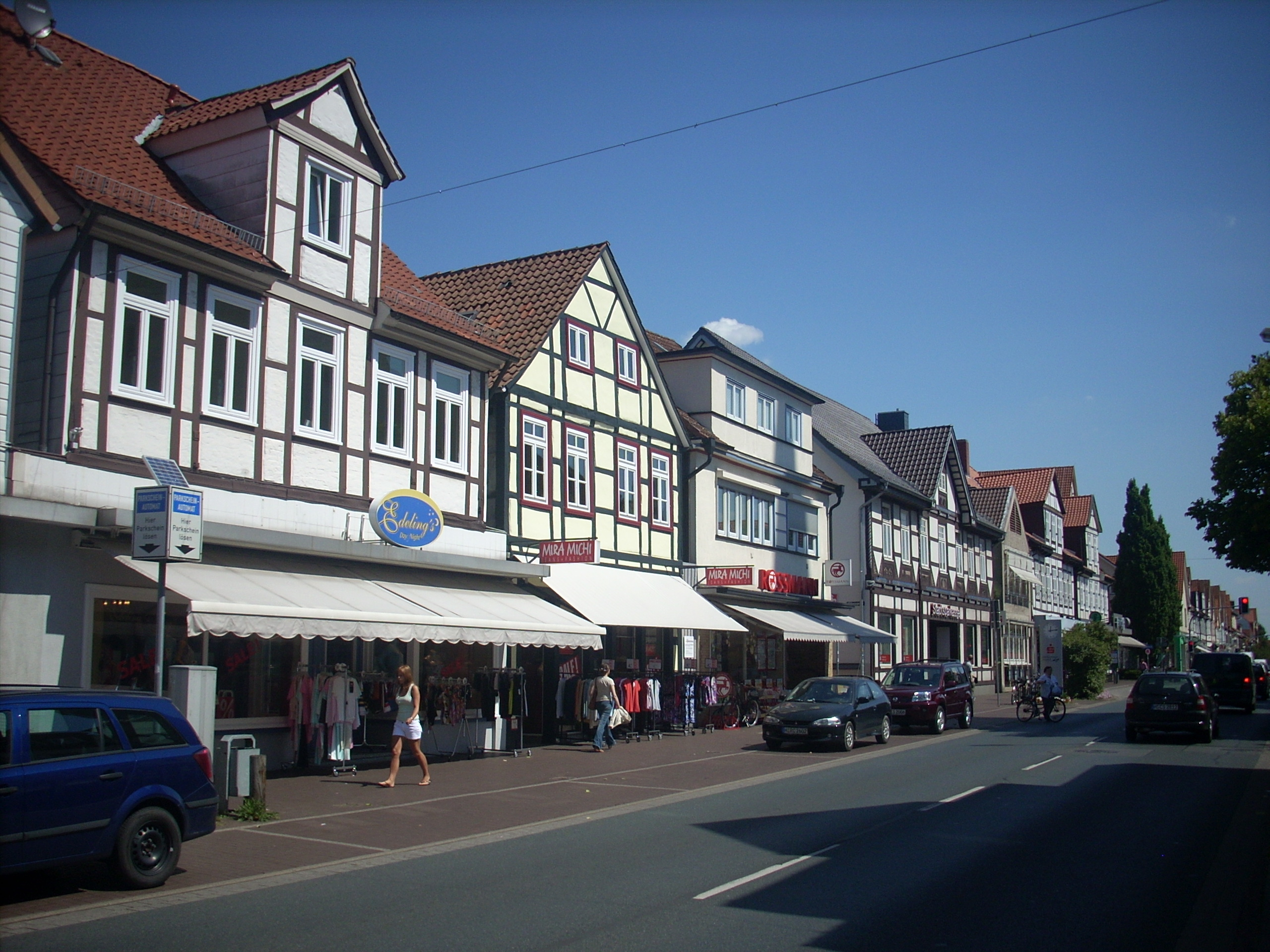

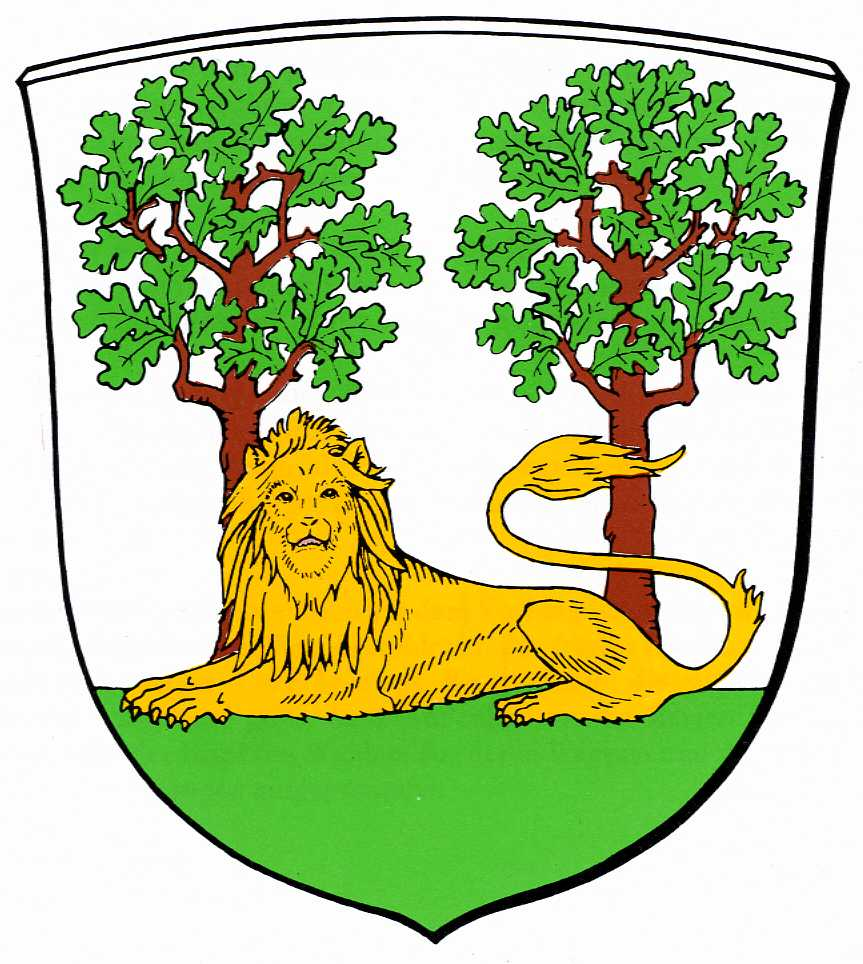
- Flag Coat of arms

- Location of Burgdorf within Hanover district
- Interactive map of Burgdorf
- Location within Germany Location within Lower Saxony
- Coordinates: 52°27′0″N 10°0′30″E
- Country: Germany
- State: Lower Saxony
- District: Hanover

Government
  - Mayor (2019–24): Armin Pollehn (CDU)

Area
  - Total: 112.56 km^{2} (43.46 sq mi)
- Elevation: 56 m (184 ft)

Population (2025-12-31)
  - Total: 31,059
  - Density: 275.93/km^{2} (714.66/sq mi)
- Time zone: UTC+01:00 (CET)
  - Summer (DST): UTC+02:00 (CEST)
- Postal codes: 31303
- Dialling codes: 05136, 05085
- Vehicle registration: H
- Website: www.burgdorf.de

Burgdorf (German pronunciation: [ˈbʊʁkˌdɔʁf]; Low German: Bortörp) is a town in the Hanover Region, in Lower Saxony, Germany. It is situated approximately 22 km northeast of Hanover. Until 1974, Burgdorf was the capital of the Burgdorf district. The town and its surrounding areas are known for the tradition of growing white Asparagus and for breeding Hanoverian horses. Burgdorf hosts a monthly horse market from April to September every year.

== Geography ==
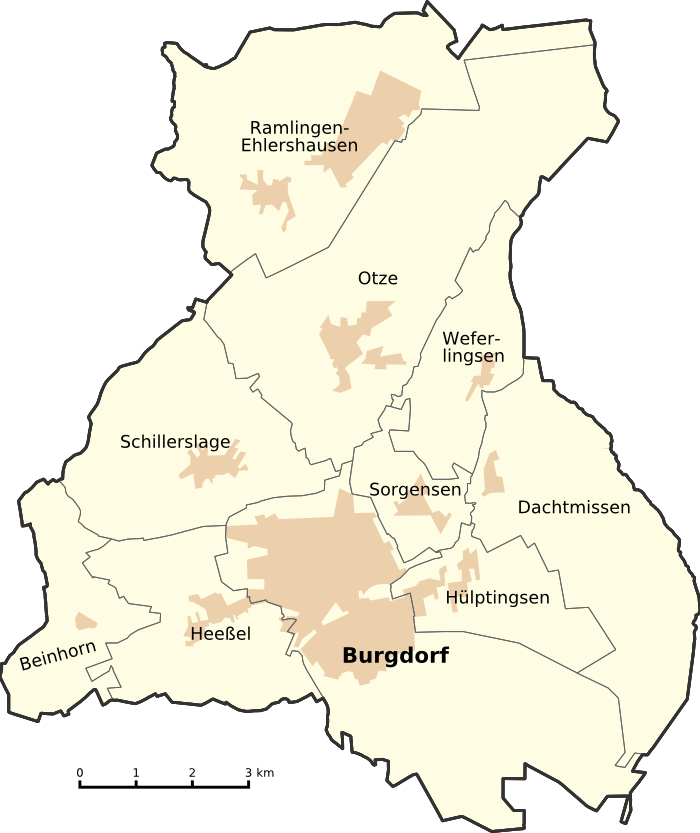
Burgdorf's division into localities

Burgdorf lies between the city of Hanover and the towns Celle and Peine. It shares borders with Uetze, Lehrte, Isernhagen, Burgwedel and the Celle district. The river Aue flows through the town. The landscape is shaped by the Burgdorf-Peine Geest, a mostly flat landscape with low hills and sandy soil. Forests consist mostly of Scots pines, birch trees and English oaks. The municipal area is surrounded by the Altwarmbüchener and Oldhorster Moor in the west, and the Burgdorfer Holz forest in the east.

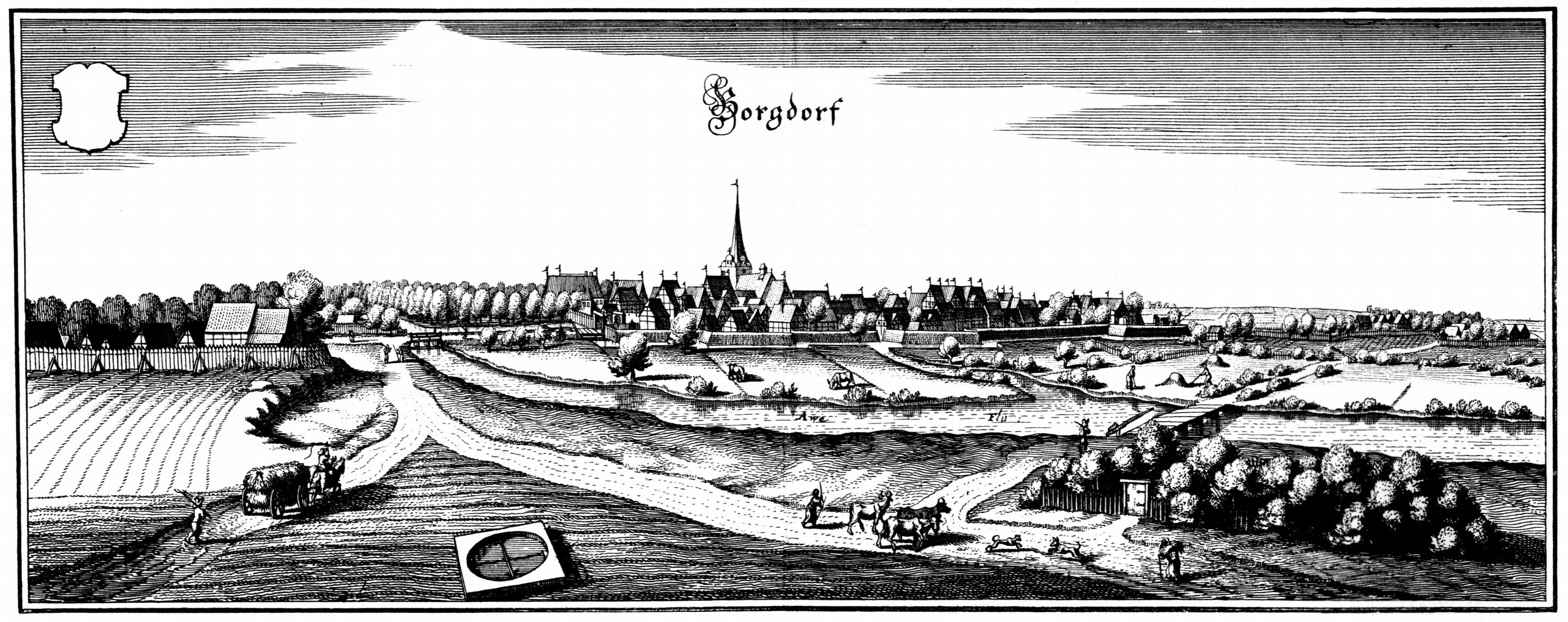
Burgdorf in the year 1654 on a Merian engraving

Burgdorf comprises the town proper and the villages Beinhorn, Dachtmissen, Heeßel, Hülptingsen, Otze, Ramlingen-Ehlershausen, Schillerslage, Sorgensen and Weferlingsen. Ramlingen-Ehlershausen consists of the villages Ramlingen and Ehlershausen. Heeßel also includes the hamlet Ahrbeck southwest of the town proper.

There is an informal division of the town into Weststadt (west of the railroad), Nordstadt (east of the railroad and north of Gartenstraße street) and Südstadt (west of the railroad and south of the river Aue; also including the formerly abandoned village of Eseringen). The remainder is referred to as Innenstadt (town center) or Altstadt (old town). Weststadt is referred to as "Burgdorf/Weststadt" on town signs, whereas the north, south and central portions are simply called "Burgdorf".

== History ==
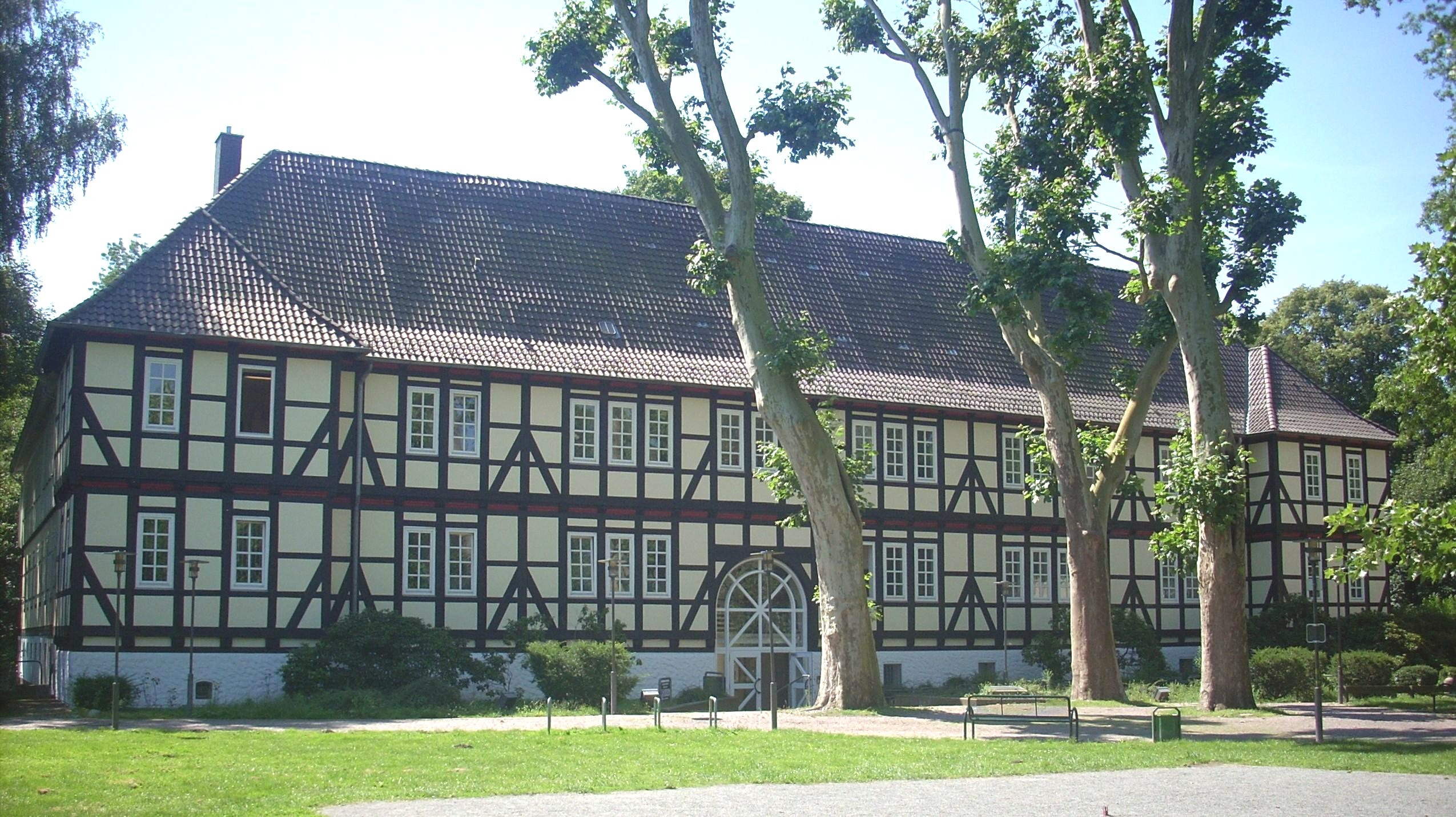
Burgdorfer Schloss (mansion)

Burgdorf was first mentioned in 1279. It was part of the Diocese of Hildesheim. The town was surrounded by a number of settlements that were lost during the middle ages. The names of the settlements were Eseringen (now part of Südstadt), Garvesse (between Burgdorf, Steinwedel and Immensen), Hetelingen (now in the woods of Burgdorfer Holz), Rälingsen (south of Hängisen) and Oensingen. After the Lesser Hildesheim Diocesan Feud (1420 to 1422), the place was given to the Dukes of Celle. Their territories later became part of the Duchy of Brunswick-Lüneburg and then the administrative region of Lüneburg. In 1433, the mansion of Burgdorf was rebuilt and fortified with a wall, three gates and two moats. Burgdorf was merely a village back then.

From the sixteenth century on, Burgdorf held the town seal and coat of arms with a lion resting between two oak trees. The colors and flag of the town, green and yellow, are derived from this coat of arms.

In the Thirty Years' War, there was a battle close to Dachtmissen. In 1637, citizens of Burgdorf rioted against the tributes imposed upon them. Fires destroyed large parts of the town in 1658 and 1809, but it was rebuilt each time. Brandende ("Fire's end") square in the old town still reminds of the place where the flames were finally subdued.

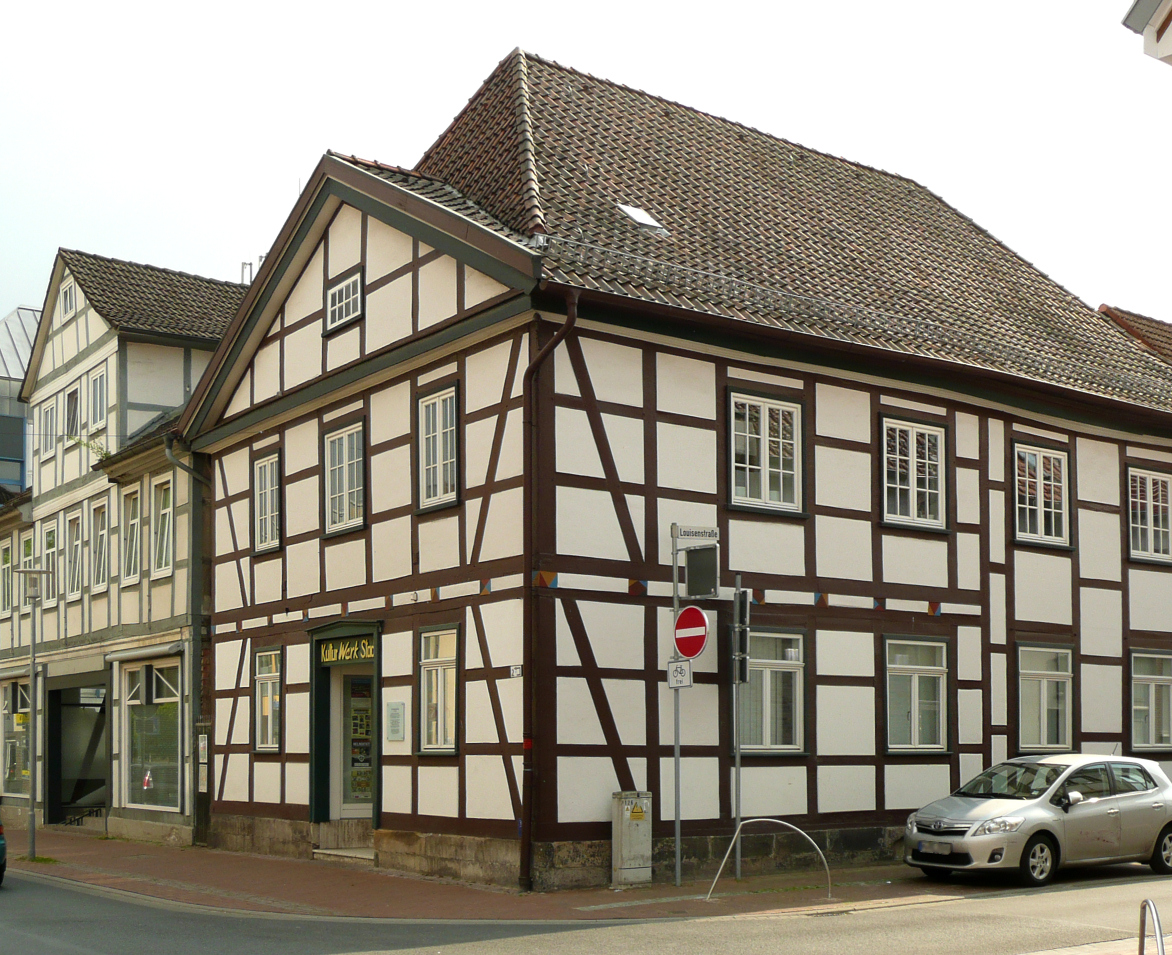
Synagogue of Burgdorf

In 1811, a new synagogue was built for the Jewish community in the town. They were forced to sell the building to the town in 1939. Hitlerjugend occupyed the building from 1941 on. It was used as a public library from 1944 to 1959. A businessman bought the building in 2007 and rented it to the town. Since 2008, it is used as a museum and cultural center.

Burgdorf became seat of the eponymous District in 1885. Despite resistance of the local population, it was merged with the Neustadt am Rübenberge, Springe and the old Hanover Districts to the new Hanover (district) in 1974. Thus Burgdorf moved from the administrative region of Lüneburg to that of Hanover. It was dissolved in the end of the year 2004 along with all other Lower Saxon administrative regions. The city and district of Hanover merged on November 1., 2001 to form Hanover Region.

== Culture ==
=== Sports ===
The most successful club from the town is TSV Hannover-Burgdorf, competing in the German Handball-Bundesliga ever since 2009.

=== Language ===
Historically, Burgdorf was part of the Eastphalian Low German language area. Standard German replaced Low German in the urban areas around Hanover from the 19th century on and nowadays the whole area is said to be speaking the purest form of Standard German. There are, however, a few peculiarities in the colloquial language, which can partially be explained by a Low German substratum. /l/ is often vocalized in the syllable coda, so that "mal" sounds like "ma" and "solche" like "Seuche". Short /ɪ/ merges with short /ʏ/ and lenition of intervocalic consonants is frequent, so that standard "bitte" sounds like "büdde" [ˈbʏ.də]. People from the area often say "ebent" instead of "eben". Adverbial tmesis is also frequent ("Da kann ich nichts für" instead of "Dafür kann ich nichts").

== Transport ==
Burgdorf is connected to Hanover via the A37 motorway, which passes into the B3 highway to Celle north of the town. The B188 bypasses the northern side of the town and connects it to Gifhorn and Wolfsburg. The B443 runs from north to south and connects Burgdorf to Lehrte and Sehnde.

Burgdorf has three train stations: Burgdorf (Hannover), Otze and Ehlershausen, which are all part of the Lehrte–Celle railway. They are served every half hour in both directions by the lines S6 and S7 of the Hanover S-Bahn. Burgdorf's train station also has bus terminals for various lines of the RegioBus Hannover and is part of the Großraum-Verkehr Hannover transport association ticketing system. The closest international airport is Hannover-Langenhagen Airport.

== Notable people ==
- Carl Sprengel (1787–1859), economist, farmer, professor, manufacturer and writer, was born in Schiller's location
- Heinrich Wilhelm Ferdinand Wackenroder (1798–1854), chemist and pharmacist
- Heinrich Breling (1849–1914), genre and historical painter
- Wilhelm Schönmann (1889–1970), chess master

=== Associated with Burgdorf ===
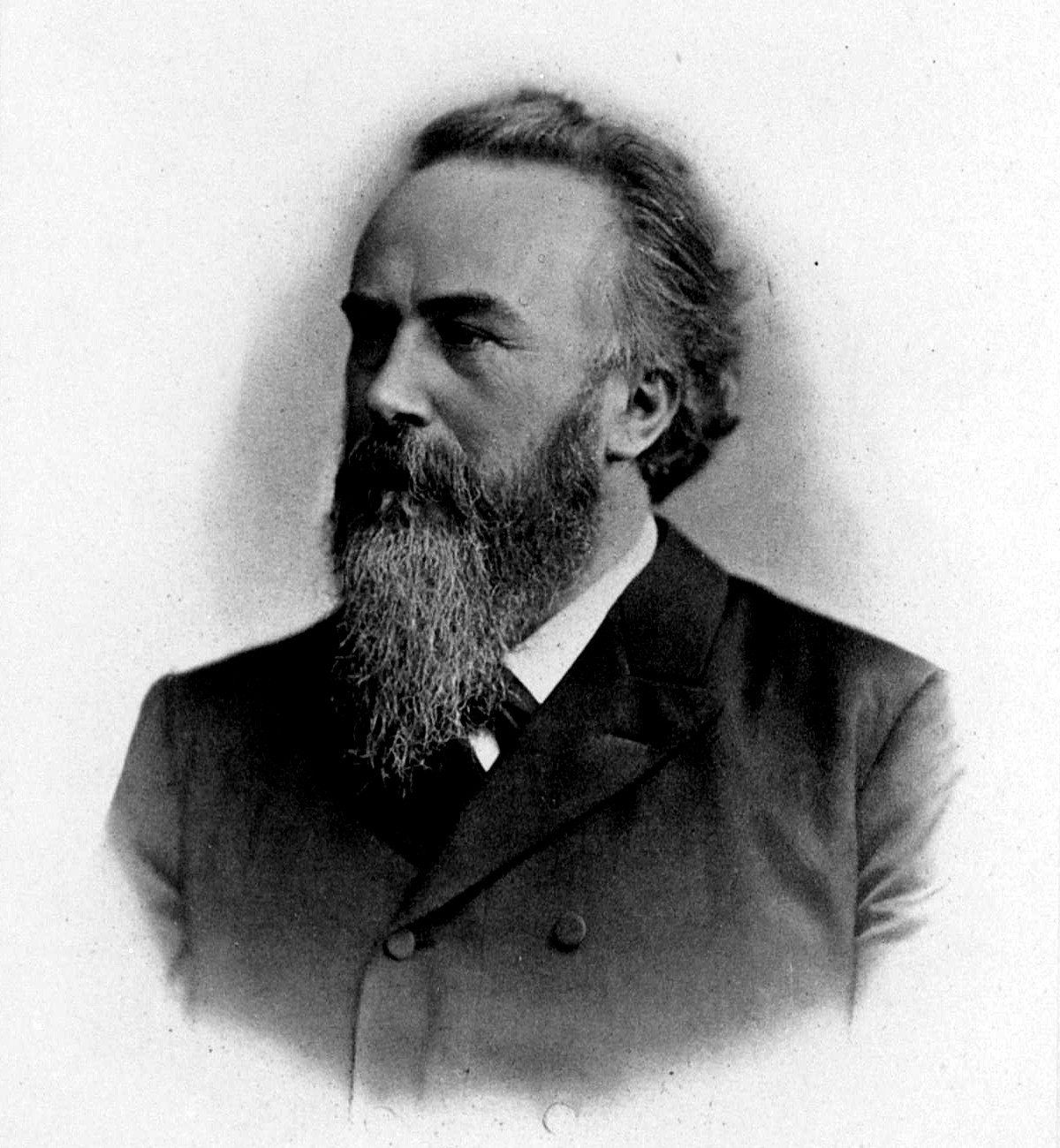
Philipp Spitta

- Philipp Spitta (1801–1859), Protestant religious poet
- Karl Heinrich Ulrichs (1825–1895), lawyer, first sexual researcher on homosexuality
- Arthur Dietzsch (1901–1974), Functional inmate and Kapo
- Ernst Albrecht (1930–2014), former Prime Minister and Minister of Justice of Lower Saxony (CDU), lived in Burgdorf-Beinhorn
- Burkhard Driest (born 1939), actor, writer and producer
- Bernd Lange (born 1955), politician (SPD), member of the European Parliament, lives in Burgdorf
- Heiko von der Leyen (born 1955), doctor and university lecturer, lives in Burgdorf-Beinhorn
- Ursula von der Leyen (born 1958), politician (CDU), resides in Burgdorf-Beinhorn
- Florian Meyer (born 1968), football referee

== Twin towns – sister cities ==
Burgdorf is twinned with:

- Burgdorf, Switzerland
- Calbe, Germany
