= Burgwedel =

- Town
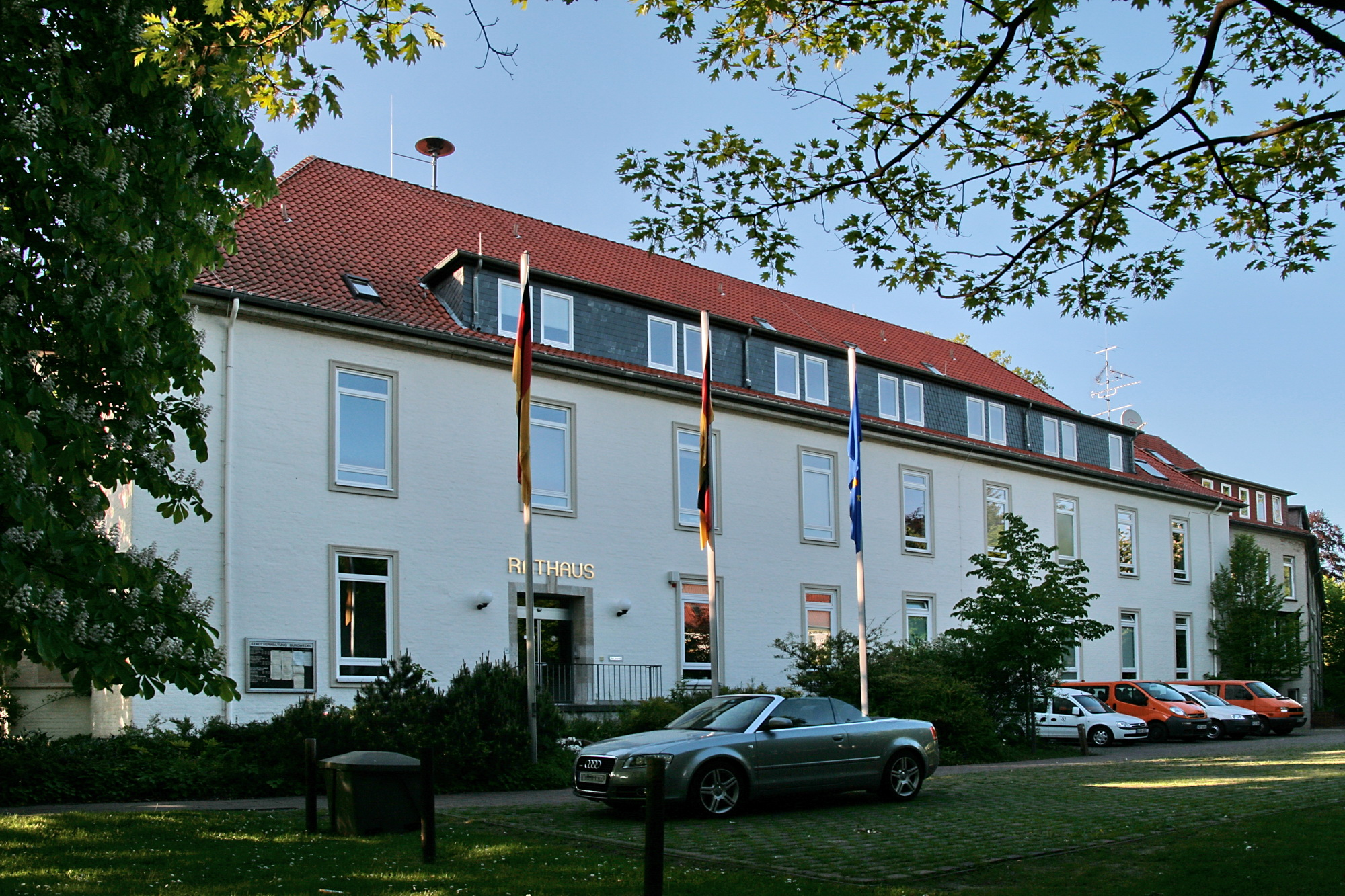
- Town hall

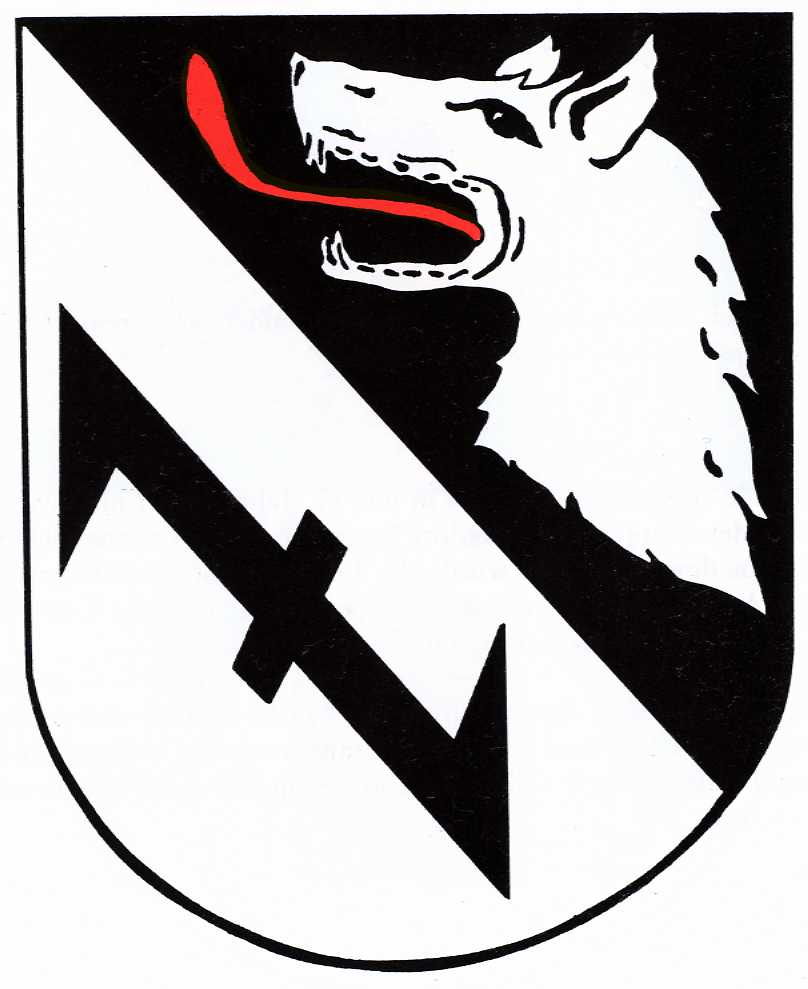
- Coat of arms

- Location of Burgwedel within Hanover district
- Interactive map of Burgwedel
- Location within Germany Location within Lower Saxony
- Coordinates: 52°29′36″N 09°51′31″E
- Country: Germany
- State: Lower Saxony
- District: Hanover
- Subdivisions: 7 districts

Government
  - Mayor (2021–26): Ortrud Wendt (CDU)

Area
  - Total: 152.85 km^{2} (59.02 sq mi)
- Elevation: 53 m (174 ft)

Population (2025-12-31)
  - Total: 20,328
  - Density: 132.99/km^{2} (344.45/sq mi)
- Time zone: UTC+01:00 (CET)
  - Summer (DST): UTC+02:00 (CEST)
- Postal codes: 30938
- Dialling codes: 05139, 05135 (Fuhrberg)
- Vehicle registration: H
- Website: www.burgwedel.de

Burgwedel (German pronunciation: [bʊʁkˈveːdl̩]) is a town in the district of Hanover, in Lower Saxony, Germany. It is situated approximately 15 km northeast of Hanover. It has a population of around 20,200.

== Politics and Administration ==
Burgwedel consists of the following boroughs:

- Engensen
- Fuhrberg
- Großburgwedel (administrative seat)
- Kleinburgwedel
- Oldhorst
- Thönse
- Wettmar

== Religion ==
=== Roman Catholic Church ===
The members of the Roman Catholic St. Paul's parish community Burgwedel make up the second largest religious community of the town. St. Paul's belongs to the diocese of Hildesheim, which is part of the ecclesiastical province of Hamburg.

== Economics ==
=== Companies ===
The headquarters of Rossmann, a major drugstore chain, are located in Burgwedel.

== Twin towns – sister cities ==
Burgwedel is twinned with:

- Domfront en Poiraie, France

== Personalities ==
=== Notable people ===
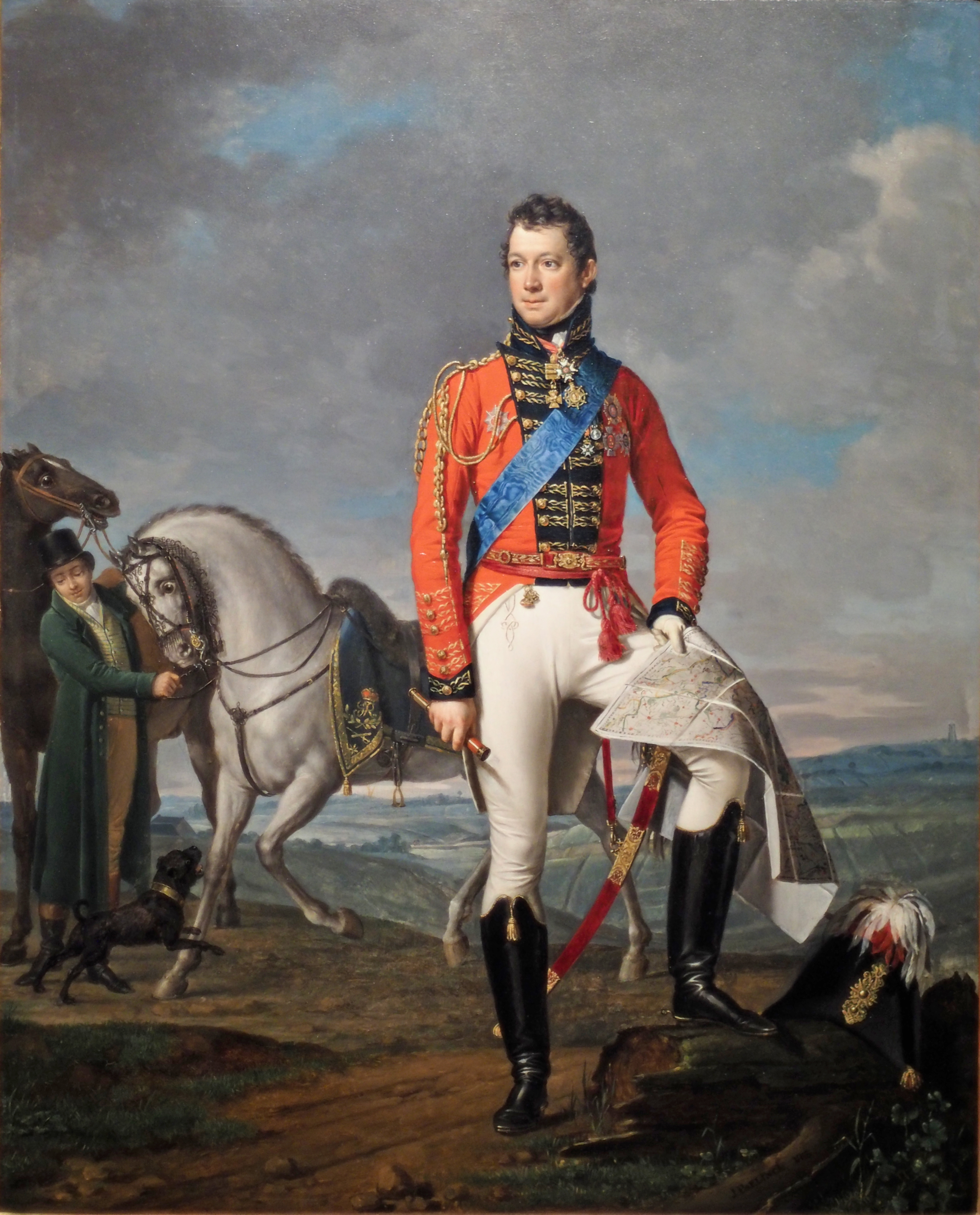
Charles, Count Alten

- Charles, Count Alten (1764-1840), German army officer and politician
- Otto Wöhler (1894-1987), General of the Wehrmacht and war criminal
- Valmir Sulejmani (born 1996), German footballer, played about 230 games

=== Notable residents ===
- Hermann Bahlsen (1927-2014), entrepreneur
- Dieter Schatzschneider (born 1958), soccer player, played 399 games
- Christian Wulff (born 1959), politician (CDU), former Federal President, former Lower Saxony Minister President
- Hendrik Hoppenstedt (born 1972), politician, (CDU), member of the Bundestag since 2013, previously local mayor
- Bettina Wulff (born 1973), wife of Christian Wulff
- Mike Hanke (born 1983), footballer, played 322 games and 12 for Germany
