= Wedemark =

- Municipality
- Flag Coat of arms

- Location of Wedemark within Hanover district
- Interactive map of Wedemark
- Location within Germany Location within Lower Saxony
- Coordinates: 52°32′N 9°43′E
- Country: Germany
- State: Lower Saxony
- District: Hanover
- Subdivisions: 16 districts

Government
  - Mayor (2021–26): Helge Zychlinski (SPD)

Area
  - Total: 174.27 km^{2} (67.29 sq mi)
- Elevation: 48 m (157 ft)

Population (2025-12-31)
  - Total: 29,647
  - Density: 170.12/km^{2} (440.61/sq mi)
- Time zone: UTC+01:00 (CET)
  - Summer (DST): UTC+02:00 (CEST)
- Postal codes: 30900
- Dialling codes: 05130, 05072, 05131
- Vehicle registration: H
- Website: www.wedemark.de

Wedemark (German pronunciation: [ˈveːdəmaʁk]; Eastphalian: Wiemark) is a municipality in the district of Hanover, in Lower Saxony, Germany. Wedemark is a historical landscape description for the area and is situated approximately 20 km north of Hanover. It ranks third on average per capita income in Lower Saxony.

== Geography ==
Wedemark's neighbors are the municipalities Burgwedel, Isernhagen, Langenhagen, Garbsen, Neustadt am Rübenberge, Lindwedel and Wietze (clockwise, beginning in the East).

== Division of the town ==
Wedemark consists of 16 formerly independent villages, with a total of nearly 30,000 inhabitants all together.

- Abbensen
- Bennemühlen
- Berkhof (with Plumhof and Sprockhof)
- Bissendorf, Westerfeldweg 8
- Brelingen
- Duden-Rodenbostel
- Elze
- Gailhof
- Hellendorf
- Meitze
- Mellendorf
- Negenborn
- Oegenbostel (with Bestenbostel and Ibsingen)
- Resse
- Scherenbostel (with Schlage-Ickhorst and Wiechendorf)
- Wennebostel (with Wennebostel-Wietze)

== Transport ==
=== Car ===
Motorway A7 (Hamburg – Hanover) marks the East border of Wedemark (motorway exits in Berkhof and Mellendorf), whereas to the South the A352 (motorway exit Langenhagen-Kaltenweide) runs towards the north-western edge of Hanover.

=== Train ===
There are three train stations in Wedemark, namely in Bennemühlen, Mellendorf and Bissendorf, with half-hourly services to Hanover during weekdays. In Mellendorf and Bennemühlen there are also connecting trains on local line to Hamburg, with the line running through the Lüneburg Heath, and the towns of Schwarmstedt, Hodenhagen, Walsrode, Bad Fallingbostel, Soltau and Schneverdingen along the line, taking a total of nearly three hours for 150 km.

== Twin towns – sister cities ==
Wedemark is twinned with:

- Roye, France
