= Celle – Uelzen =

Federal electoral district of Germany

44 Celle – Uelzen
- Electoral district for the Bundestag
- Celle – Uelzen in 2025
- State: Lower Saxony
- Population: 271,400 (2019)
- Electorate: 214,482 (2021)
- Major settlements: Celle; Uelzen
- Area: 3,013.4 km^{2}

Current electoral district
- Created: 1949
- Party: CDU
- Member: Henning Otte
- Elected: 2009, 2013, 2017, 2021, 2025

Celle – Uelzen is an electoral constituency (German: Wahlkreis) represented in the Bundestag. It elects one member via first-past-the-post voting. Under the current constituency numbering system, it is designated as constituency 44. It is located in eastern Lower Saxony, comprising the districts of Celle and Uelzen.

Celle – Uelzen was created for the inaugural 1949 federal election. Since 2009, it has been represented by Henning Otte of the Christian Democratic Union (CDU).

== Geography ==
Celle – Uelzen is located in eastern Lower Saxony. As of the 2021 federal election, it comprises the entirety of the districts of Celle and Uelzen.

== History ==
Celle – Uelzen was created in 1949, then known as Celle. It acquired its current name in the 1980 election. In the inaugural Bundestag election, it was Lower Saxony constituency 16 in the numbering system. From 1953 through 1961, it was number 38. From 1965 through 1998, it was number 39. In the 2002 and 2005 elections, it was number 44. In the 2009 election, it was number 45. Since the 2013 election, it has been number 44.

Originally, the constituency comprised the independent city of Celle, the district of Celle, and the municipalities of Burgdorf and Uetze from the Burgdorf district. In the 1965 election, it lost the Uetze municipality while acquiring the rest of the Burgdorf district. For the 1976 election, it comprised the Celle district and the municipalities of Burgdorf, Burgwedel, Isernhagen, Lehrte, Sehnde, and Wedemark from the Landkreis Hannover district. It acquired its current borders in the 1980 election.

Election	No.	Name	Borders
1949	16	Celle	Celle city; Celle district; Burgdorf district (only Burgdorf and Uetze municipalities)
1953	38	Celle	Celle city; Celle district; Burgdorf district (only Burgdorf and Uetze municipalities)
1957	38	Celle	Celle city; Celle district; Burgdorf district (only Burgdorf and Uetze municipalities)
1961	38	Celle	Celle city; Celle district; Burgdorf district (only Burgdorf and Uetze municipalities)
1965	39	Celle	Celle city; Celle district; Burgdorf district (excluding Uetze municipality)
1969	39	Celle	Celle city; Celle district; Burgdorf district (excluding Uetze municipality)
1972	39	Celle	Celle city; Celle district; Burgdorf district (excluding Uetze municipality)
1976	39	Celle	Celle district; Landkreis Hannover district (only Burgdorf, Burgwedel, Isernhagen, Lehrte, Sehnde, and Wedemark municipalities)
1980	39	Celle – Uelzen	Celle district; Uelzen district
1983	39	Celle – Uelzen	Celle district; Uelzen district
1987	39	Celle – Uelzen	Celle district; Uelzen district
1990	39	Celle – Uelzen	Celle district; Uelzen district
1994	39	Celle – Uelzen	Celle district; Uelzen district
1998	39	Celle – Uelzen	Celle district; Uelzen district
2002	44	Celle – Uelzen	Celle district; Uelzen district
2005	44	Celle – Uelzen	Celle district; Uelzen district
2009	45	Celle – Uelzen	Celle district; Uelzen district
2013	44	Celle – Uelzen	Celle district; Uelzen district
2017	44	Celle – Uelzen	Celle district; Uelzen district
2021	44	Celle – Uelzen	Celle district; Uelzen district
2025	44	Celle – Uelzen	Celle district; Uelzen district

== Members ==
The constituency was first held by Lisa Korspeter of the Social Democratic Party (SPD), who served from 1949 to 1957. Margot Kalinke of the German Party (DP) won in 1957 and served a single term. She was succeeded by Wilhelm Brese of the Christian Democratic Union (CDU), who served 1961 to 1969. Party fellow Hans Hubrig served from 1969 to 1972, when the SPD won the constituency. Klaus-Jürgen Hedrich served from 1972 to 1976, when Hubrig again won. He served until 1983. Olaf Sund of the CDU served from then until 1998, when the SPD's Peter Struck won the constituency. In 2009, Henning Otte of the CDU was elected representative. He was re-elected in 2013, 2017, and 2021.

Election	Member	Party	%
1949	Lisa Korspeter	SPD	27.9
1953	Lisa Korspeter	SPD	25.5
1957	Margot Kalinke	DP	39.4
1961	Wilhelm Brese	CDU	42.4
1965	Wilhelm Brese	CDU	49.3
1969	Hans Hubrig	CDU	48.3
1972	Olaf Sund	SPD	47.6
1976	Hans Hubrig	CDU	49.2
1980	Hans Hubrig	CDU	46.9
1983	Klaus-Jürgen Hedrich	CDU	53.3
1987	Klaus-Jürgen Hedrich	CDU	49.4
1990	Klaus-Jürgen Hedrich	CDU	51.3
1994	Klaus-Jürgen Hedrich	CDU	49.5
1998	Peter Struck	SPD	48.6
2002	Peter Struck	SPD	50.1
2005	Peter Struck	SPD	46.7
2009	Henning Otte	CDU	44.2
2013	Henning Otte	CDU	48.5
2017	Henning Otte	CDU	42.7
2021	Henning Otte	CDU	32.9
2025	Henning Otte	CDU	35.2

== Election results ==
=== 2025 election ===
Federal election (2025): Celle – Uelzen
Notes:	Blue background denotes the winner of the electorate vote. Pink background denotes a candidate elected from their party list. Yellow background denotes an electorate win by a list member, or other incumbent. A ✓ or ✗ denotes status of any incumbent, win or lose respectively.						
Party	Candidate	Votes	%	±%	Party votes	%	±%
CDU	✓ Henning Otte	61,114	35.2	▲2.3	51,631	29.7	▲3.7
SPD	Anna Hohmann	40,060	23.1	▼9.3	36,321	20.9	▼9.9
AfD	Thomas Ehrhorn	34,961	20.1	▲10.9	35,375	20.3	▲11.1
Greens	Daniel Beer	16,097	9.3	▼2.7	17,787	10.2	▼3.7
Left	Manuela Mast	10,277	5.9	▲3.1	12,190	7.0	▲4.0
BSW					6,281	3.6	
FDP	Anja Schulz	5,920	3.4	▼5.2	7,504	4.3	▼7.2
FW	Jan Müller	3,441	2.0	▼0.2	1,691	1.0	0.0
Tierschutzpartei					2,263	1.3	▼0.1
Volt	Wiktor Jaworowski	1,752	1.0		964	0.6	▲0.4
PARTEI					804	0.5	▼0.5
dieBasis					497	0.3	▼0.7
Pirates					282	0.2	▼0.2
BD					221	0.1	
Humanists					101	0.1	0.0
MLPD					28	0.0	0.0
Team Todenhöfer							▼0.1
ÖDP							▼0.1
Informal votes		1,288			970		
Total valid votes		173,622			173,940		
Turnout		174,910	82.4	▲8.7			
CDU hold	Majority	21,054	12.1				

=== 2021 election ===
Federal election (2021): Celle – Uelzen
Notes:	Blue background denotes the winner of the electorate vote. Pink background denotes a candidate elected from their party list. Yellow background denotes an electorate win by a list member, or other incumbent. A ✓ or ✗ denotes status of any incumbent, win or lose respectively.						
Party	Candidate	Votes	%	±%	Party votes	%	±%
CDU	✓ Henning Otte	51,504	32.9	▼9.8	40,993	26.1	▼10.4
SPD	Dirk-Ulrich Mende	50,635	32.3	▲2.4	48,332	30.8	▲5.4
Greens	Markus Jordan	18,773	12.0	▲6.2	21,882	14.0	▲6.2
AfD	Thomas Ehrhorn	14,498	9.3	▼0.8	14,423	9.2	▼1.7
FDP	Anja Schulz	13,412	8.6	▲3.1	17,990	11.5	▲1.3
Left	Christoph Podstawa	4,357	2.8	▼2.1	4,680	3.0	▼2.8
Tierschutzpartei					2,169	1.4	▲0.5
dieBasis					1,592	1.0	
FW	Philip Siebold	3,399	2.2	▲1.1	1,578	1.0	▲0.5
PARTEI					1,454	0.9	▲0.1
Pirates					566	0.4	▲0.1
Volt					266	0.2	
Team Todenhöfer					225	0.1	
NPD					176	0.1	▼0.2
ÖDP					128	0.1	0.0
V-Partei3					124	0.1	0.0
Humanists					99	0.1	
du.					75	0.0	
Independent	Andrew Schlüter	56	0.0				
DKP					34	0.0	0.0
LKR					28	0.0	
MLPD					16	0.0	0.0
Informal votes		1,388			1,192		
Total valid votes		156,634			156,830		
Turnout		158,022	73.7	▼1.9			
CDU hold	Majority	869	0.6	▼12.1			

=== 2017 election ===
Federal election (2017): Celle – Uelzen
Notes:	Blue background denotes the winner of the electorate vote. Pink background denotes a candidate elected from their party list. Yellow background denotes an electorate win by a list member, or other incumbent. A ✓ or ✗ denotes status of any incumbent, win or lose respectively.						
Party	Candidate	Votes	%	±%	Party votes	%	±%
CDU	✓ Henning Otte	68,655	42.7	▼5.8	58,858	36.6	▼7.5
SPD	Kirsten Lühmann	48,189	30.0	▼4.3	40,899	25.4	▼4.7
AfD	Thomas Ehrhorn	16,199	10.1	▲5.8	17,554	10.9	▲5.9
Greens	Heiko Wundram	9,266	5.8	▼0.4	12,478	7.8	0.0
FDP	Anja Schulz	8,830	5.5	▲4.1	16,334	10.1	▲6.0
Left	Paul Stern	7,901	4.9	▲1.3	9,297	5.8	▲1.2
FW		1,756	1.1	▲0.2	888	0.6	▼0.1
Tierschutzpartei					1,436	0.9	▲0.1
PARTEI					1,331	0.8	
Pirates					476	0.3	▼1.4
NPD					438	0.3	▼0.7
DM					232	0.1	
BGE					217	0.1	
DiB					176	0.1	
V-Partei³					176	0.1	
ÖDP					145	0.1	
MLPD					49	0.0	0.0
DKP					22	0.0	
Informal votes		1,349			1,139		
Total valid votes		160,796			161,006		
Turnout		162,145	75.6	▲2.6			
CDU hold	Majority	20,466	12.7	▼1.6			

=== 2013 election ===
Federal election (2013): Celle – Uelzen
Notes:	Blue background denotes the winner of the electorate vote. Pink background denotes a candidate elected from their party list. Yellow background denotes an electorate win by a list member, or other incumbent. A ✓ or ✗ denotes status of any incumbent, win or lose respectively.						
Party	Candidate	Votes	%	±%	Party votes	%	±%
CDU	✓ Henning Otte	75,369	48.5	▲4.3	68,568	44.0	▲8.4
SPD	Kirsten Lühmann	53,237	34.2	▲1.9	46,931	30.1	▲2.9
Greens	Bernd Ebeling	9,563	6.1	▼0.8	12,071	7.8	▼1.7
AfD	Thomas Ehrhorn	6,591	4.2		7,722	5.0	
Left	Behiye Uca	5,655	3.6	▼2.9	7,085	4.6	▼3.0
FDP	Ralf Josef Überheim	2,091	1.3	▼6.0	6,478	4.2	▼10.2
Pirates					2,673	1.7	▼0.2
NPD	Joachim Nahtz	1,677	1.1	▼0.5	1,511	1.0	▼0.5
FW	Klaus Prigge	1,313	0.8		982	0.6	
Tierschutzpartei					1,173	0.8	0.0
PBC					183	0.1	
PRO					144	0.1	
REP					149	0.1	
MLPD					27	0.0	0.0
Informal votes		1,562			1,361		
Total valid votes		155,496			155,697		
Turnout		157,058	73.0	▲0.6			
CDU hold	Majority	22,132	14.3	▲2.4			

=== 2009 election ===
Federal election (2009): Celle – Uelzen
Notes:	Blue background denotes the winner of the electorate vote. Pink background denotes a candidate elected from their party list. Yellow background denotes an electorate win by a list member, or other incumbent. A ✓ or ✗ denotes status of any incumbent, win or lose respectively.						
Party	Candidate	Votes	%	±%	Party votes	%	±%
CDU	Henning Otte	68,572	44.2	▲2.7	55,393	35.6	▼0.7
SPD	Kirsten Lühmann	50,107	32.3	▼14.4	42,402	27.3	▼13.3
FDP	Ralf Überheim	11,351	7.3	▲3.7	22,295	14.3	▲4.8
Greens	Sabine Brunke-Reubold	10,801	7.0	▲3.9	14,770	9.5	▲3.0
Left	Enrico Schülbe	10,130	6.5	▲3.3	11,765	7.6	▲3.4
Pirates					2,957	1.9	
NPD	Manfred Börm	2,501	1.6	▲0.1	2,291	1.5	▼0.1
RRP	Margarete Rose	1,684	1.1		2,023	1.3	
Tierschutzpartei					1,130	0.7	▲0.1
ÖDP					190	0.1	
DVU					180	0.1	
MLPD					40	0.0	0.0
Informal votes		1,991			1,701		
Total valid votes		155,146			155,436		
Turnout		157,137	72.3	▼6.7			
CDU gain from SPD	Majority	18,465	11.9				

=== 2005 election ===
Federal election (2005):Celle – Uelzen
Notes:	Blue background denotes the winner of the electorate vote. Pink background denotes a candidate elected from their party list. Yellow background denotes an electorate win by a list member, or other incumbent. A ✓ or ✗ denotes status of any incumbent, win or lose respectively.						
Party	Candidate	Votes	%	±%	Party votes	%	±%
SPD	✓ Peter Struck	79,449	46.7	▼3.4	69,053	40.5	▼3.8
CDU	Henning Otte	70,623	41.5	▲1.6	61,932	36.4	▼1.8
FDP	Albrecht Hoppenstedt	6,156	3.6	▼1.2	16,195	9.5	▲2.4
Left	Gert Brandes	5,477	3.2	▲2.2	7,086	4.2	▲3.2
Greens	Annegret Pfützner	5,275	3.1	0.0	11,021	6.5	▼0.1
NPD	Joachim Nathz	2,489	1.5		2,614	1.5	▲1.3
Tierschutzpartei					1,000	0.6	▲0.2
PBC	Gabriele von Rumohr	748	0.4	0.0	560	0.3	0.0
GRAUEN					579	0.3	▲0.2
Pro German Center – Pro D-Mark Initiative					136	0.1	
BüSo					77	0.0	0.0
MLPD					52	0.0	
Informal votes		2,006			1,918		
Total valid votes		170,217			170,305		
Turnout		172,223	79.0	▼1.2			
SPD hold	Majority	8,826	5.2				
