= Gifhorn – Peine =

Federal electoral district of Germany

45 Gifhorn – Peine
- Electoral district for the Bundestag
- Gifhorn – Peine in 2025
- State: Lower Saxony
- Population: 284,800 (2019)
- Electorate: 219,966 (2021)
- Major settlements: Peine; Gifhorn
- Area: 1,819.6 km^{2}

Current electoral district
- Created: 1949
- Party: SPD
- Member: Hubertus Heil
- Elected: 1998, 2002, 2005, 2009, 2013, 2017, 2021, 2025

Gifhorn – Peine is an electoral constituency (German: Wahlkreis) represented in the Bundestag. It elects one member via first-past-the-post voting. Under the current constituency numbering system, it is designated as constituency 45. It is located in eastern Lower Saxony, comprising the Peine district and most of the Gifhorn district.

Gifhorn – Peine was created for the inaugural 1949 federal election. Since 1998, it has been represented by Hubertus Heil of the Social Democratic Party (SPD).

== Geography ==
Gifhorn – Peine is located in eastern Lower Saxony. As of the 2021 federal election, it comprises the district of Peine and the district of Gifhorn with the exception of the Samtgemeinden of Boldecker Land and Brome, as well as the Giebel area.

== History ==
Gifhorn – Peine was created in 1949, then known as Peine – Gifhorn. In the 1965 through 1976 elections, it was named Gifhorn. It acquired its current name in the 1980 election. In the inaugural Bundestag election, it was Lower Saxony constituency 32 in the numbering system. From 1953 through 1961, it was number 54. From 1965 through 1998, it was number 40. In the 2002 and 2005 elections, it was number 45. In the 2009 election, it was number 46. Since the 2013 election, it has been number 45.

Originally, the constituency comprised the Peine district, the independent city of Wolfsburg, and the municipalities of Gifhorn and Meine and the Samtgemeinden of Isenbüttel and Meinersen from the Gifhorn district. From the 1965 through 1972 elections, it comprised the districts of Gifhorn and Peine and the municipality of Uetze from the district of Burgdorf. In the 1976 election, Uetze became part of the district of Landkreis Hannover, though the borders of Gifhorn constituency did not change. In the 1980 through 1998 elections, the constituency comprised the entirety of the Gifhorn and Peine districts. It acquired its current borders in the 2002 election.

Election	No.	Name	Borders
1949	32	Peine – Gifhorn	Peine district; Wolfsburg city; Gifhorn district (only the Gifhorn and Meine municipalities and the Isenbüttel and Meinersen Samtgemeinden)
1953	54	Peine – Gifhorn	Peine district; Wolfsburg city; Gifhorn district (only the Gifhorn and Meine municipalities and the Isenbüttel and Meinersen Samtgemeinden)
1957	54	Peine – Gifhorn	Peine district; Wolfsburg city; Gifhorn district (only the Gifhorn and Meine municipalities and the Isenbüttel and Meinersen Samtgemeinden)
1961	54	Peine – Gifhorn	Peine district; Wolfsburg city; Gifhorn district (only the Gifhorn and Meine municipalities and the Isenbüttel and Meinersen Samtgemeinden)
1965	40	Gifhorn	Gifhorn district; Peine district; Burgdorf district (only Uetze municipality)
1969	40	Gifhorn	Gifhorn district; Peine district; Burgdorf district (only Uetze municipality)
1972	40	Gifhorn	Gifhorn district; Peine district; Burgdorf district (only Uetze municipality)
1976	40	Gifhorn	Gifhorn district; Peine district; Landkreis Hannover district (only Uetze municipality)
1980	40	Gifhorn – Peine	Gifhorn district; Peine district
1983	40	Gifhorn – Peine	Gifhorn district; Peine district
1987	40	Gifhorn – Peine	Gifhorn district; Peine district
1990	40	Gifhorn – Peine	Gifhorn district; Peine district
1994	40	Gifhorn – Peine	Gifhorn district; Peine district
1998	40	Gifhorn – Peine	Gifhorn district; Peine district
2002	45	Gifhorn – Peine	Peine district; Gifhorn district (excluding Boldecker Land and Brome Samtgemeinden and the Giebel area)
2005	45	Gifhorn – Peine	Peine district; Gifhorn district (excluding Boldecker Land and Brome Samtgemeinden and the Giebel area)
2009	46	Gifhorn – Peine	Peine district; Gifhorn district (excluding Boldecker Land and Brome Samtgemeinden and the Giebel area)
2013	45	Gifhorn – Peine	Peine district; Gifhorn district (excluding Boldecker Land and Brome Samtgemeinden and the Giebel area)
2017	45	Gifhorn – Peine	Peine district; Gifhorn district (excluding Boldecker Land and Brome Samtgemeinden and the Giebel area)
2021	45	Gifhorn – Peine	Peine district; Gifhorn district (excluding Boldecker Land and Brome Samtgemeinden and the Giebel area)
2025	45	Gifhorn – Peine	Peine district; Gifhorn district (excluding Boldecker Land and Brome Samtgemeinden and the Giebel area)

== Members ==
The constituency was first held by Joachim Schöne of the Social Democratic Party (SPD), who served from 1949 to 1957. Arthur Enk of the Christian Democratic Union (CDU) won in 1957 and served a single term. Uwe-Jens Nissen of the SPD won the constituency in 1961, but Enk returned in 1965. In 1969, Philipp von Bismarck replaced Enk as CDU candidate and won. Hermann Barche of the SPD was elected in 1972, but served only a single term before von Bismarck returned as representative in 1976. In 1980, the SPD regained the constituency again, this time with candidate Adolf Stockleben. In 1983, Engelbert Nelle of the CDU won, and served until 1998. In 1998, Hubertus Heil of the SPD was elected representative. He was re-elected in 2002, 2005, 2009, 2013, 2017, and 2021.

Election	Member	Party	%
1949	Joachim Schöne	SPD	34.3
1953	Joachim Schöne	SPD	30.0
1957	Arthur Enk	CDU	38.1
1961	Uwe-Jens Nissen	SPD	43.0
1965	Arthur Enk	CDU	48.1
1969	Philipp von Bismarck	CDU	48.6
1972	Hermann Barche	SPD	50.4
1976	Philipp von Bismarck	CDU	48.3
1980	Adolf Stockleben	SPD	48.7
1983	Engelbert Nelle	CDU	50.7
1987	Engelbert Nelle	CDU	45.8
1990	Engelbert Nelle	CDU	48.3
1994	Engelbert Nelle	CDU	45.7
1998	Hubertus Heil	SPD	53.4
2002	Hubertus Heil	SPD	54.2
2005	Hubertus Heil	SPD	51.1
2009	Hubertus Heil	SPD	40.5
2013	Hubertus Heil	SPD	43.3
2017	Hubertus Heil	SPD	37.8
2021	Hubertus Heil	SPD	43.7
2025	Hubertus Heil	SPD	33.9

== Election results ==
=== 2025 election ===
Federal election (2025): Gifhorn – Peine
Notes:	Blue background denotes the winner of the electorate vote. Pink background denotes a candidate elected from their party list. Yellow background denotes an electorate win by a list member, or other incumbent. A ✓ or ✗ denotes status of any incumbent, win or lose respectively.						
Party	Candidate	Votes	%	±%	Party votes	%	±%
SPD	✓ Hubertus Heil	61,985	33.9	▼9.8	43,689	23.9	▼11.8
CDU	Marian Meyer	50,970	27.9	▲3.5	50,192	27.4	▲4.5
AfD	Robert Preuß	38,892	21.3	▲12.0	38,988	21.3	▲11.6
Greens	Danny Prieske	11,760	6.4	▼3.1	17,417	9.5	▼3.8
Left	Victor Sherazee	9,063	5.0	▲2.8	11,869	6.5	▲4.0
BSW					6,986	3.8	
FDP	Dirk-Heinrich Heuer	4,714	2.6	▼3.9	6,809	3.7	▼6.1
FW	Matthias Laue	2,663	1.5	▲0.2	1,399	0.8	▼0.2
Tierschutzpartei					2,313	1.3	▼0.1
Volt	Anna-Marie Herrmann	1,656	0.9		1,045	0.6	▲0.3
BD	Siegfried Colberg	913	0.5		360	0.2	
PARTEI					804	0.4	▼0.5
dieBasis					554	0.3	▼0.9
Pirates					286	0.2	▼0.2
Humanists					141	0.1	0.0
MLPD					43	0.0	0.0
Informal votes		1,228			949		
Total valid votes		182,616			182,895		
Turnout		183,844	84.7	▲9.0			
SPD hold	Majority	11,015	6.0	▼13.3			

=== 2021 election ===
Federal election (2021): Gifhorn – Peine
Notes:	Blue background denotes the winner of the electorate vote. Pink background denotes a candidate elected from their party list. Yellow background denotes an electorate win by a list member, or other incumbent. A ✓ or ✗ denotes status of any incumbent, win or lose respectively.						
Party	Candidate	Votes	%	±%	Party votes	%	±%
SPD	✓ Hubertus Heil	72,113	43.7	▲5.9	58,846	35.7	▲5.6
CDU	Ingrid Pahlmann	40,279	24.4	▼11.6	37,839	23.0	▼10.8
Greens	Henrik Werner	15,762	9.6	▲4.0	21,960	13.3	▲6.1
AfD	Stefan Marzischewski-Drewes	15,346	9.3	▼0.6	16,048	9.7	▼1.2
FDP	Thomas Schellhorn	10,738	6.5	▲1.7	16,238	9.9	▲1.5
Left	Andreas Mantzke	3,619	2.2	▼3.1	4,147	2.5	▼3.6
Tierschutzpartei	Marika Orend	2,820	1.7		2,256	1.4	▲0.4
FW	Wolfgang Gemba	2,084	1.3		1,627	1.0	▲0.6
dieBasis	Marita Draheim	2,016	1.2		1,942	1.2	
PARTEI					1,429	0.9	0.0
Pirates					642	0.4	0.0
Team Todenhöfer					582	0.4	
Volt					415	0.3	
ÖDP					184	0.1	0.0
NPD					174	0.1	▼0.2
Humanists					133	0.1	
du.					121	0.1	
V-Partei3					113	0.1	▼0.1
Independent	Ute Vibeke Neumann	103	0.1				
LKR	Nadine Schladebeck	120	0.1		74	0.0	
DKP					32	0.0	0.0
MLPD					28	0.0	0.0
Independent	Angela Kunick	24	0.0				
Informal votes		1,568			1,762		
Total valid votes		165,024			164,830		
Turnout		166,592	75.7	▼1.5			
SPD hold	Majority	31,834	19.3	▲17.6			

=== 2017 election ===
Federal election (2017): Gifhorn – Peine
Notes:	Blue background denotes the winner of the electorate vote. Pink background denotes a candidate elected from their party list. Yellow background denotes an electorate win by a list member, or other incumbent. A ✓ or ✗ denotes status of any incumbent, win or lose respectively.						
Party	Candidate	Votes	%	±%	Party votes	%	±%
SPD	✓ Hubertus Heil	63,294	37.8	▼5.4	50,445	30.1	▼6.0
CDU	Ingrid Pahlmann	60,345	36.1	▼6.0	56,567	33.8	▼6.4
AfD	Rupert Ostrowski	16,501	9.9		18,289	10.9	▲7.3
Greens	Stefanie Maria Weigand	9,342	5.6	▲0.8	12,094	7.2	▼0.2
Left	Klaus Brinkmann	8,827	5.3	▲1.0	10,166	6.3	▲1.3
FDP	Holger Flöge	8,062	4.8	▲3.4	14,004	8.4	▲4.8
Tierschutzpartei					1,591	0.9	▲0.2
PARTEI					1,454	0.9	
Bündnis C	Klaus-Dieter Schlottmann	725	0.4				
Pirates					663	0.4	▼1.4
FW					581	0.3	▼0.1
NPD					463	0.3	▼0.7
DM					367	0.2	
V-Partei³					259	0.2	
MLPD	Peter Volker Kunick	277	0.2		97	0.1	0.0
BGE					208	0.1	
DiB					185	0.1	
ÖDP					123	0.1	
DKP					17	0.0	
Informal votes		1,488			1,288		
Total valid votes		167,373			167,573		
Turnout		168,861	77.3	▲2.7			
SPD hold	Majority	2,949	1.7	▲0.6			

=== 2013 election ===
Federal election (2013): Gifhorn – Peine
Notes:	Blue background denotes the winner of the electorate vote. Pink background denotes a candidate elected from their party list. Yellow background denotes an electorate win by a list member, or other incumbent. A ✓ or ✗ denotes status of any incumbent, win or lose respectively.						
Party	Candidate	Votes	%	±%	Party votes	%	±%
SPD	✓ Hubertus Heil	69,259	43.2	▲2.8	57,875	36.1	▲3.2
CDU	Ingrid Pahlmann	67,368	42.1	▲5.1	64,451	40.2	▲6.8
Greens	Monika Berkhan	7,666	4.8	▼1.2	11,855	7.4	▼1.5
Left	Jürgen Eggers	6,810	4.3	▼3.1	7,575	4.7	▼3.6
AfD					5,786	3.6	
Pirates	Matthias Stoll	3,063	1.9		2,833	1.8	▼0.3
FDP	Ernst Schreiber	2,266	1.4	▼4.9	5,648	3.5	▼7.7
NPD	David Grahn	1,937	1.2	▼0.1	1,524	0.9	▼0.2
Tierschutzpartei					1,242	0.8	0.0
FW	Mathias Djelassi	934	0.6		671	0.4	
PBC	Klaus-Dieter Schlottmann	850	0.5	0.0	616	0.4	
PRO					212	0.1	
REP					134	0.1	
MLPD					46	0.0	0.0
Informal votes		1,788			1,473		
Total valid votes		160,153			160,468		
Turnout		161,941	74.5	▲0.3			
SPD hold	Majority	1,891	1.1	▼2.4			

=== 2009 election ===
Federal election (2009): Gifhorn – Peine
Notes:	Blue background denotes the winner of the electorate vote. Pink background denotes a candidate elected from their party list. Yellow background denotes an electorate win by a list member, or other incumbent. A ✓ or ✗ denotes status of any incumbent, win or lose respectively.						
Party	Candidate	Votes	%	±%	Party votes	%	±%
SPD	✓ Hubertus Heil	64,365	40.5	▼10.6	52,292	32.8	▼13.5
CDU	Ewa Klamt	58,827	37.0	▲0.2	53,085	33.3	▲1.0
Left	Jürgen Eggers	11,663	7.3	▲3.9	13,314	8.4	▲4.2
FDP	Holger Flöge	10,073	6.3	▲3.2	17,875	11.2	▲3.1
Greens	Rolf Bräuer	9,476	6.0	▲2.7	14,217	8.9	▲2.8
Pirates					3,359	2.1	
NPD	Uwe Kallweit	2,029	1.3	0.0	1,882	1.2	▼0.1
RRP	Detlef Haar	1,346	0.8		1,497	0.9	
Tierschutzpartei					1,297	0.8	▲0.2
PBC	Klaus-Dieter Schlottmann	838	0.5	▼0.1			
Independent	Ute Vibeke Neumann	388	0.2				
ÖDP					181	0.1	
DVU					155	0.1	
MLPD					41	0.0	0.0
Informal votes		2,012			1,822		
Total valid votes		159,005			159,195		
Turnout		161,017	74.2	▼6.6			
SPD hold	Majority	5,538	3.5	▼10.8			

=== 2005 election ===
Federal election (2005):Gifhorn – Peine
Notes:	Blue background denotes the winner of the electorate vote. Pink background denotes a candidate elected from their party list. Yellow background denotes an electorate win by a list member, or other incumbent. A ✓ or ✗ denotes status of any incumbent, win or lose respectively.						
Party	Candidate	Votes	%	±%	Party votes	%	±%
SPD	✓ Hubertus Heil	87,957	51.1	▼3.2	79,969	46.4	▼5.1
CDU	Eva Möllring	63,355	36.8	0.0	55,810	32.4	▼1.2
Left	Mathias Schwang	5,984	3.5	▲2.6	7,193	4.2	▲3.4
Greens	Reinhard Wolf	5,645	3.3	▼0.2	10,509	6.1	▲0.3
FDP	Holge Flöge	5,354	3.1	▼0.8	14,026	8.1	▲2.0
NPD	Andreas Hollstein	2,192	1.3		2,232	1.3	▲1.0
PBC	Klaus-Dieter Schlottmann	1,138	0.7	▲0.1	851	0.5	▲0.1
Tierschutzpartei					1,037	0.6	▲0.3
GRAUEN					559	0.3	▲0.2
Alliance for Health, Peace and Social Justice	Ute Neumann	570	0.3				
Pro German Center – Pro D-Mark Initiative					117	0.1	
BüSo					92	0.01	0.0
MLPD					67	0.0	
Informal votes		2,478			2,211		
Total valid votes		172,195			172,462		
Turnout		174,673	80.8	▼1.4			
SPD hold	Majority	24,602	14.3				
