= Hannover-Land II =

Federal electoral district of Germany

47 Hannover-Land II
- Electoral district for the Bundestag
- Hannover-Land II in 2025
- State: Lower Saxony
- Population: 313,800 (2019)
- Electorate: 238,323 (2021)
- Major settlements: Lehrte; Laatzen; Seelze
- Area: 957.1 km^{2}

Current electoral district
- Created: 1949
- Party: SPD
- Member: Matthias Miersch
- Elected: 2005, 2009, 2013, 2017, 2021, 2025

Hannover-Land II is an electoral constituency (German: Wahlkreis) represented in the Bundestag. It elects one member via first-past-the-post voting. Under the current constituency numbering system, it is designated as constituency 47. It is located in central Lower Saxony, comprising the southern part of the Hanover Region.

Hannover-Land II was created for the inaugural 1949 federal election. Since 2005, it has been represented by Matthias Miersch of the Social Democratic Party (SPD).

== Geography ==
Hannover-Land II is located in central Lower Saxony. As of the 2021 federal election, it comprises the northern part of the Hanover Region, specifically the municipalities of Barsinghausen, Gehrden, Hemmingen, Laatzen, Lehrte, Pattensen, Ronnenberg, Seelze, Sehnde, Springe, Uetze, and Wennigsen.

== History ==
Hannover-Land II was created in 1949, then known as Hannover-Land. In the 1965 through 1976 elections, it was named Hannover III. It acquired its current name in the 1980 election. In the inaugural Bundestag election, it was Lower Saxony constituency 20 in the numbering system. From 1953 through 1961, it was number 42. From 1965 through 1976, it was number 38. From 1980 through 1998, it was number 42. In the 2002 and 2005 elections, it was number 47. In the 2009 election, it was number 48. Since the 2013 election, it has been number 47.

Originally, the constituency comprised the entirety of the now-abolished Landkreis Hannover district, as well as the municipalities of Lehrte and Sehnde from the Burgdorf district. In the 1965 through 1976 elections, it comprised the Landkreis Hannover district and the quarters of Döhren, Wülfel, Kirchrode, Bemerode, and Wülferode from the independent city of Hanover. After administrative boundaries were redrawn, from the 1980 election the constituency comprised the municipalities of Barsinghausen, Gehrden, Hemmingen, Laatzen, Pattensen, Ronnenberg, Seelze, Sehnde, Springe, Wennigsen, and Wunstorf from the Landkreis Hannover district. In the 2002 election, it lost Wunstorf while gaining Uetze und Lehrte.

Election	No.	Name	Borders
1949	20	Hannover-Land	Landkreis Hannover district; Burgdorf district (only Lehrte and Sehnde municipalities)
1953	42	Hannover-Land	Landkreis Hannover district; Burgdorf district (only Lehrte and Sehnde municipalities)
1957	42	Hannover-Land	Landkreis Hannover district; Burgdorf district (only Lehrte and Sehnde municipalities)
1961	42	Hannover-Land	Landkreis Hannover district; Burgdorf district (only Lehrte and Sehnde municipalities)
1965	38	Hannover III	Landkreis Hannover district; Hanover city (only Döhren, Wülfel, Kirchrode, Bemerode, and Wülferode quarters)
1969	38	Hannover III	Landkreis Hannover district; Hanover city (only Döhren, Wülfel, Kirchrode, Bemerode, and Wülferode quarters)
1972	38	Hannover III	Landkreis Hannover district; Hanover city (only Döhren, Wülfel, Kirchrode, Bemerode, and Wülferode quarters)
1976	38	Hannover III	Landkreis Hannover district; Hanover city (only Döhren, Wülfel, Kirchrode, Bemerode, and Wülferode quarters)
1980	42	Hannover-Land II	Landkreis Hannover district (only Barsinghausen, Gehrden, Hemmingen, Laatzen, Pattensen, Ronnenberg, Seelze, Sehnde, Springe, Wennigsen, and Wunstorf municipalities)
1983	42	Hannover-Land II	Landkreis Hannover district (only Barsinghausen, Gehrden, Hemmingen, Laatzen, Pattensen, Ronnenberg, Seelze, Sehnde, Springe, Wennigsen, and Wunstorf municipalities)
1987	42	Hannover-Land II	Landkreis Hannover district (only Barsinghausen, Gehrden, Hemmingen, Laatzen, Pattensen, Ronnenberg, Seelze, Sehnde, Springe, Wennigsen, and Wunstorf municipalities)
1990	42	Hannover-Land II	Landkreis Hannover district (only Barsinghausen, Gehrden, Hemmingen, Laatzen, Pattensen, Ronnenberg, Seelze, Sehnde, Springe, Wennigsen, and Wunstorf municipalities)
1994	42	Hannover-Land II	Landkreis Hannover district (only Barsinghausen, Gehrden, Hemmingen, Laatzen, Pattensen, Ronnenberg, Seelze, Sehnde, Springe, Wennigsen, and Wunstorf municipalities)
1998	42	Hannover-Land II	Landkreis Hannover district (only Barsinghausen, Gehrden, Hemmingen, Laatzen, Pattensen, Ronnenberg, Seelze, Sehnde, Springe, Wennigsen, and Wunstorf municipalities)
2002	47	Hannover-Land II	Hanover Region (only Barsinghausen, Gehrden, Hemmingen, Laatzen, Lehrte, Pattensen, Ronnenberg, Seelze, Sehnde, Springe, Wennigsen, and Uetze municipalities)
2005	47	Hannover-Land II	Hanover Region (only Barsinghausen, Gehrden, Hemmingen, Laatzen, Lehrte, Pattensen, Ronnenberg, Seelze, Sehnde, Springe, Wennigsen, and Uetze municipalities)
2009	48	Hannover-Land II	Hanover Region (only Barsinghausen, Gehrden, Hemmingen, Laatzen, Lehrte, Pattensen, Ronnenberg, Seelze, Sehnde, Springe, Wennigsen, and Uetze municipalities)
2013	47	Hannover-Land II	Hanover Region (only Barsinghausen, Gehrden, Hemmingen, Laatzen, Lehrte, Pattensen, Ronnenberg, Seelze, Sehnde, Springe, Wennigsen, and Uetze municipalities)
2017	47	Hannover-Land II	Hanover Region (only Barsinghausen, Gehrden, Hemmingen, Laatzen, Lehrte, Pattensen, Ronnenberg, Seelze, Sehnde, Springe, Wennigsen, and Uetze municipalities)
2021	47	Hannover-Land II	Hanover Region (only Barsinghausen, Gehrden, Hemmingen, Laatzen, Lehrte, Pattensen, Ronnenberg, Seelze, Sehnde, Springe, Wennigsen, and Uetze municipalities)
2025	47	Hannover-Land II	Hanover Region (only Barsinghausen, Gehrden, Hemmingen, Laatzen, Lehrte, Pattensen, Ronnenberg, Seelze, Sehnde, Springe, Wennigsen, and Uetze municipalities)

== Members ==
The constituency has been held by the Social Democratic Party (SPD) during all but three Bundestag terms since its creation. Its first representative was Hans Jahn of the SPD, who served from 1949 to 1961. He was succeeded by fellow SPD member Werner Marquardt, who served until 1976. The SPD's Günter Kiehm served a single term before the constituency was won by Herbert Lattmann of the CDU in 1983. Kiehm regained it in 1987, but Lattmann was elected in 1990 and again in 1994. In 1998, Horst Schild of the SPD won the constituency and served two terms as representative. He was succeeded in 2005 by Matthias Miersch, who was re-elected in 2009, 2013, 2017, and 2021.

Election	Member	Party	%
1949	Hans Jahn	SPD	45.9
1953	Hans Jahn	SPD	43.6
1957	Hans Jahn	SPD	44.1
1961	Werner Marquardt	SPD	49.0
1965	Werner Marquardt	SPD	48.0
1969	Werner Marquardt	SPD	51.9
1972	Werner Marquardt	SPD	55.7
1976	Werner Marquardt	SPD	49.2
1980	Günter Kiehm	SPD	50.8
1983	Herbert Lattmann	CDU	46.6
1987	Günter Kiehm	SPD	45.1
1990	Herbert Lattmann	CDU	44.9
1994	Herbert Lattmann	CDU	44.8
1998	Horst Schild	SPD	55.2
2002	Horst Schild	SPD	54.2
2005	Matthias Miersch	SPD	51.5
2009	Matthias Miersch	SPD	40.4
2013	Matthias Miersch	SPD	43.4
2017	Matthias Miersch	SPD	37.0
2021	Matthias Miersch	SPD	40.7
2025	Matthias Miersch	SPD	31.8

== Election results ==
=== 2025 election ===
Federal election (2025): Hannover-Land II
Notes:	Blue background denotes the winner of the electorate vote. Pink background denotes a candidate elected from their party list. Yellow background denotes an electorate win by a list member, or other incumbent. A ✓ or ✗ denotes status of any incumbent, win or lose respectively.						
Party	Candidate	Votes	%	±%	Party votes	%	±%
SPD	✓ Matthias Miersch	62,395	31.8	▼8.9	47,478	24.1	▼10.5
CDU	Tilman Kuban	59,006	30.0	▲4.6	53,994	27.5	▲4.8
AfD	Stefan Henze	33,775	17.2	▲9.7	34,337	17.5	▲9.7
Greens	Michael Steinke	17,550	8.9	▼3.5	23,995	12.2	▼4.1
Left	Dirk Tegtmeyer	10,882	5.5	▲3.3	14,602	7.4	▲4.6
BSW					7,547	3.8	
FDP	Annette Strum- Werner	4,924	2.5	▼4.1	7,840	4.0	▼6.2
Tierschutzpartei	Uwe Hillmann	3,346	1.7	▲0.2	2,426	1.2	▼0.2
FW	Sven Peterhänsel	2,208	1.1	0.0	1,386	0.7	▼0.2
Volt	Konstantin Kühnel	1,453	0.7		1,032	0.5	▲0.3
Pirates	Uwe Kopec	933	0.5	▼0.1	448	0.2	▼0.3
PARTEI				▼0.9	770	0.4	▼0.4
dieBasis				▼	414	0.2	▼0.7
BD					205	0.1	
Humanists					158	0.1	0.0
MLPD					49	0.0	0.0
Team Todenhöfer							▼0.4
ÖDP							▼0.1
Informal votes		1,288			1,079		
Total valid votes		197,472			196,681		
Turnout		197,760	84.5	▲8.5			
SPD hold	Majority	3,389	1.8				

=== 2021 election ===
Federal election (2021): Hannover-Land II
Notes:	Blue background denotes the winner of the electorate vote. Pink background denotes a candidate elected from their party list. Yellow background denotes an electorate win by a list member, or other incumbent. A ✓ or ✗ denotes status of any incumbent, win or lose respectively.						
Party	Candidate	Votes	%	±%	Party votes	%	±%
SPD	✓ Matthias Miersch	73,088	40.7	▲3.7	62,024	34.6	▲5.1
CDU	Tilman Kuban	45,721	25.5	▼9.8	40,612	22.7	▼8.9
Greens	Simone Meyer	22,283	12.4	▲6.7	29,201	16.3	▲7.6
AfD	Dirk Brandes	13,377	7.5	▼2.0	13,850	7.7	▼2.6
FDP	Nadin Zaya	11,883	6.6	▲1.2	18,320	10.2	▲0.6
Left	Thorsten Kuhn	4,095	2.3	▼3.1	4,994	2.8	▼3.8
Tierschutzpartei	Claudia Klitz	2,618	1.5		2,535	1.4	▲0.6
FW	Moritz Krienke	1,978	1.1	▲0.2	1,672	0.9	▲0.5
PARTEI	Lisa-Marie Rosien	1,701	0.9		1,432	0.8	▼0.1
dieBasis	Eva-Maria Görres	1,635	0.9		1,650	0.9	
Pirates	Uwe Kopec	1,119	0.6	▼0.3	867	0.5	0.0
Team Todenhöfer					752	0.4	
Volt					421	0.2	
NPD					169	0.1	▼0.2
Humanists					158	0.1	
V-Partei3					125	0.1	▼0.1
ÖDP					113	0.1	0.0
du.					86	0.0	
Independent	Wolfgang Göller	50	0.0				
LKR					40	0.0	
DKP					36	0.0	0.0
MLPD					35	0.0	0.0
Informal votes		1,654			2,110		
Total valid votes		179,548			179,092		
Turnout		181,202	76.0	▼2.5			
SPD hold	Majority	27,367	15.2	▲13.4			

=== 2017 election ===
Federal election (2017): Hannover-Land II
Notes:	Blue background denotes the winner of the electorate vote. Pink background denotes a candidate elected from their party list. Yellow background denotes an electorate win by a list member, or other incumbent. A ✓ or ✗ denotes status of any incumbent, win or lose respectively.						
Party	Candidate	Votes	%	±%	Party votes	%	±%
SPD	✓ Matthias Miersch	69,104	37.0	▼6.4	55,161	29.5	▼6.5
CDU	Maria Flachsbarth	65,815	35.2	▼6.6	58,984	31.5	▼6.9
AfD	Sabine Ehrke	17,570	9.4		19,392	10.4	▲6.5
Greens	Roland Christoph Panter	10,693	5.7	▲0.5	16,290	8.7	▼0.2
Left	Jessica Kaußen	10,124	5.4	▲1.4	12,305	6.6	▲1.8
FDP	Harald Klotz	10,092	5.4	▲4.0	17,925	9.6	▲5.6
FW	Beate Julitta Lange	1,691	0.9	▼0.2	822	0.4	▼0.1
PARTEI					1,679	0.9	
Pirates	Gerhard Posywio	1,677	0.9	▼0.8	936	0.5	▼1.0
Tierschutzpartei					1,556	0.8	0.0
NPD					508	0.3	▼0.6
DM					396	0.2	
DiB					312	0.2	
BGE					250	0.1	
V-Partei³					237	0.1	
ÖDP					163	0.1	
MLPD					66	0.0	0.0
DKP					34	0.0	
Informal votes		1,729			1,479		
Total valid votes		186,766			187,016		
Turnout		188,495	78.6	▲2.5			
SPD hold	Majority	3,289	1.8	▲0.3			

=== 2013 election ===
Federal election (2013): Hannover-Land II
Notes:	Blue background denotes the winner of the electorate vote. Pink background denotes a candidate elected from their party list. Yellow background denotes an electorate win by a list member, or other incumbent. A ✓ or ✗ denotes status of any incumbent, win or lose respectively.						
Party	Candidate	Votes	%	±%	Party votes	%	±%
SPD	✓ Matthias Miersch	78,433	43.4	▲2.9	65,169	35.9	▲3.1
CDU	Maria Flachsbarth	75,761	41.9	▲5.7	69,644	38.4	▲6.9
Greens	Abdulselam Dogan	9,422	5.2	▼1.7	16,212	8.9	▼1.5
Left	Agnes Hasenjäger	7,350	4.1	▼2.6	8,669	4.8	▼2.9
AfD					6,958	3.8	
Pirates	Thomas Gundelbacher	3,144	1.7		2,737	1.5	▼0.4
FDP	Dirk Weissleder	2,567	1.4	▼5.8	7,228	4.0	▼8.1
NPD	Sebastian Wolf	2,247	1.2	▼0.3	1,499	0.8	▼0.6
FW	Arno Ulrichs	1,972	1.1		1,044	0.6	
Tierschutzpartei					1,429	0.8	0.0
PRO					309	0.2	
REP					172	0.1	
PBC					168	0.1	
MLPD					53	0.0	0.0
Informal votes		2,067			1,672		
Total valid votes		180,896			181,291		
Turnout		182,963	76.1	▼0.5			
SPD hold	Majority	2,672	1.5	▼2.7			

=== 2009 election ===
Federal election (2009): Hannover-Land II
Notes:	Blue background denotes the winner of the electorate vote. Pink background denotes a candidate elected from their party list. Yellow background denotes an electorate win by a list member, or other incumbent. A ✓ or ✗ denotes status of any incumbent, win or lose respectively.						
Party	Candidate	Votes	%	±%	Party votes	%	±%
SPD	✓ Matthias Miersch	73,215	40.4	▼11.0	59,493	32.8	▼14.0
CDU	Maria Flachsbarth	65,573	36.2	▲0.1	57,144	31.5	▲1.1
FDP	Dirk Weissleder	12,982	7.2	▲3.7	22,004	12.1	▲3.6
Greens	Dorota Szymanska	12,533	6.9	▲2.8	18,936	10.4	▲2.7
Left	Gerhard-Walter Schulz	11,976	6.6	▲3.3	13,908	7.7	▲4.0
Pirates					3,528	1.9	
NPD	Karin Hollack	2,853	1.6	▲0.1	2,534	1.4	0.0
RRP	Walter Heinrich Christian Mehring	1,422	0.8		1,767	1.0	
Tierschutzpartei					1,513	0.8	▲0.2
Independent	Jorg Böttcher	502	0.3				
ÖDP					248	0.1	
DVU					181	0.1	
MLPD					53	0.0	0.0
Informal votes		2,258			2,005		
Total valid votes		181,056			181,309		
Turnout		183,314	76.6	▼5.5			
SPD hold	Majority	7,642	4.2	▼11.1			

=== 2005 election ===
Federal election (2005):Hannover-Land II
Notes:	Blue background denotes the winner of the electorate vote. Pink background denotes a candidate elected from their party list. Yellow background denotes an electorate win by a list member, or other incumbent. A ✓ or ✗ denotes status of any incumbent, win or lose respectively.						
Party	Candidate	Votes	%	±%	Party votes	%	±%
SPD	Matthias Miersch	99,465	51.5	▼2.7	90,630	46.8	▼5.2
CDU	Maria Flachsbarth	69,840	36.1	▲2.6	58,796	30.4	▼0.5
Greens	Dieter Albrecht	8,000	4.1	▼0.7	15,028	7.8	▲0.6
FDP	Peter Kimmel	6,658	3.4	▼1.2	16,590	8.6	▲2.0
Left	Stefan Müller	6,429	3.3	▲2.4	7,164	3.7	▲2.8
NPD	Frank Blome	2,834	1.5		2,634	1.4	▲1.1
Tierschutzpartei					1,157	0.6	▲0.3
GRAUEN					815	0.4	▲0.2
PBC					385	0.2	0.0
Pro German Center – Pro D-Mark Initiative					155	0.1	
BüSo					101	0.1	0.0
MLPD					83	0.0	
Informal votes		2,637			2,325		
Total valid votes		193,226			193,538		
Turnout		195,863	82.1	▼1.7			
SPD hold	Majority	29,625	15.4				
