= Matthias Miersch =

German politician (SPD)

Matthias Miersch MdB
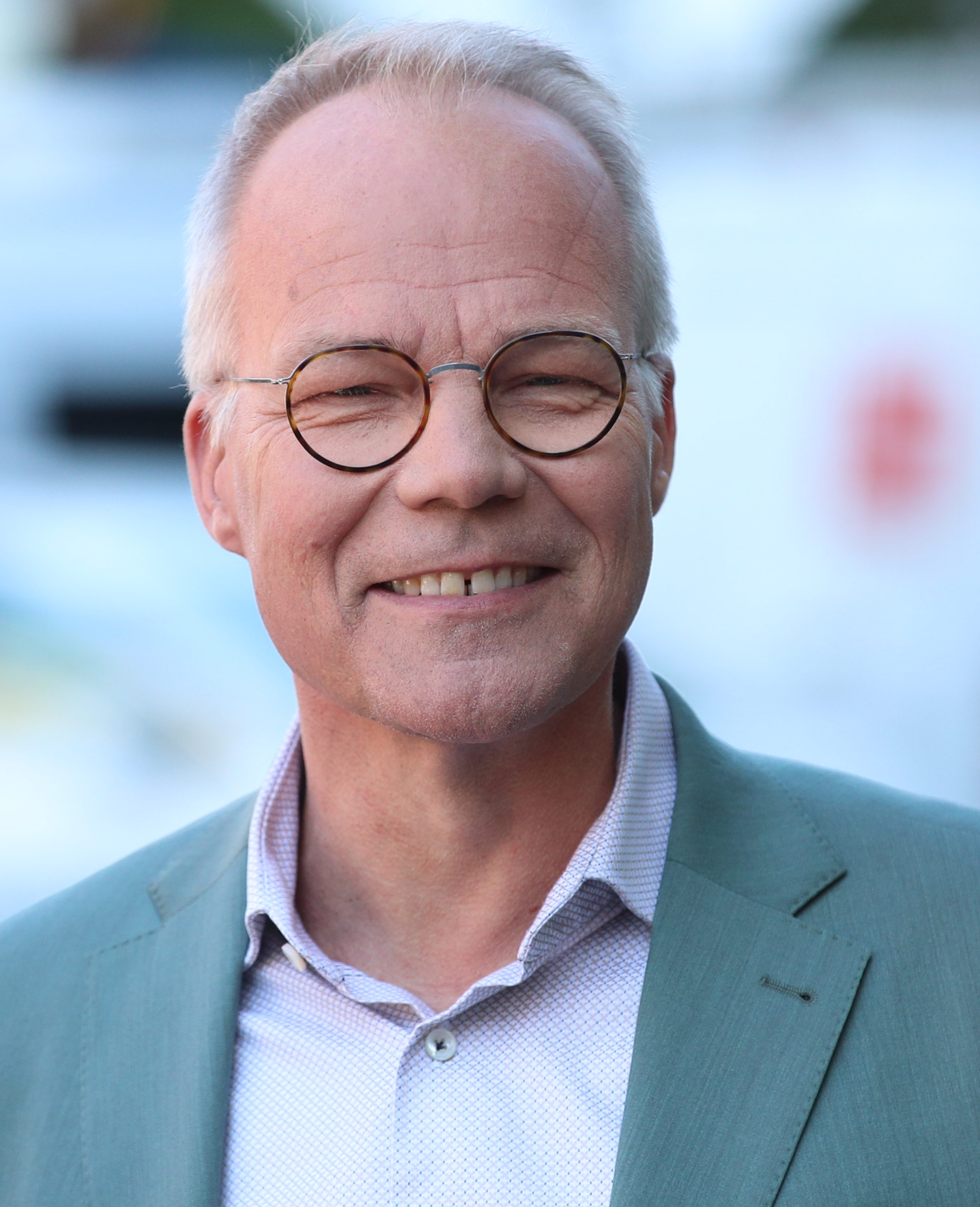
- Miersch in 2025

Leader of the Social Democratic Party in the Bundestag
- Incumbent
- Assumed office 7 May 2025
- Preceded by: Lars Klingbeil

General Secretary of the Social Democratic Party
- Acting
- In office 8 October 2024 – May 2025
- Leader: Saskia Esken; Lars Klingbeil
- Preceded by: Kevin Kühnert
- Succeeded by: Tim Klüssendorf

Member of the Bundestag; for Hannover-Land II
- Incumbent
- Assumed office 18 October 2005
- Preceded by: Horst Schild

Personal details
- Born: 19 December 1968 (age 57) Hannover, West Germany
- Party: Social Democratic (since 1990)
- Education: Leibniz University Hannover
- Occupation: Criminal defense lawyer Politician

Matthias Miersch (born 19 December 1968) is a German criminal defense lawyer and politician of the Social Democratic Party (SPD) who has been serving as Member of the Bundestag since the 2005 German federal election, representing the Hannover-Land II district. Since 2025, he has been chairing his party's parliamentary group.

From 2013 to 2025, was a member of the party's executive board under successive chairpersons Sigmar Gabriel (2013–2017), Martin Schulz (2017–2018), Andrea Nahles (2018–2019), Norbert Walter-Borjans (2019–2021), Saskia Esken (2019–2024) and Lars Klingbeil (2021–2024). On 8 October 2024 Miersch was appointed as provisional secretary general of the Social Democratic Party. After the Scholz cabinet collapsed on 7 November 2024, he led the party's campaign for the 2025 German federal election.

== Early life and education ==
Born in Hannover, Miersch studied law at the Leibniz University Hannover and the German University of Administrative Sciences Speyer. From 1988 until 1995, he volunteered for the St. John Accident Assistance.

== Political career ==
Miersch has been a member of the German Bundestag since the 2005 national election. In parliament, he initially focused on environmental policy and served on the Committee on the Environment, Nature Conservation and Nuclear Safety (2005–2017) as well as on the Committee on Legal Affairs (2005–2009).

In addition, Miersch was a member of the Parliamentary Advisory Board for Sustainable Development (2006-2009) and the Parliamentary Commission on the Disposal of Radioactive Waste (2014-2016). In 2014, he joined the parliamentary body in charge of appointing judges to the Highest Courts of Justice, namely the Federal Court of Justice (BGH), the Federal Administrative Court (BVerwG), the Federal Fiscal Court (BFH), the Federal Labour Court (BAG), and the Federal Social Court (BSG).

In the negotiations to form a Grand Coalition of the Christian Democrats (CDU together with the Bavarian CSU) and the SPD following the 2013 federal elections, Miersch was part of the SPD delegation in the working group on the environment and agriculture, led by Katherina Reiche and Ute Vogt. The Third Merkel cabinet governed until 2017, and also the Fourth Merkel cabinet was a Grand Coalition. From 2014 to 2016, Miersch was one of the members of the country's temporary National Commission on the Disposal of Radioactive Waste, chaired by Ursula Heinen-Esser and Michael Müller.

Within his parliamentary group, Miersch belongs to the Parliamentary Left, a left-wing movement. He served as spokesperson on environmental policy between 2009 and 2013. In 2015, he was elected to the parliamentary group's executive board under the leadership of chairman Thomas Oppermann. Since 2017, he has been the group's deputy chairman, under successive chairs Andrea Nahles (2017-2019) and Rolf Mützenich (since 2019).

In 2019, Miersch succeeded Stefan Schostok as chairman of the SPD in Hannover.

In the negotiations to form a so-called traffic light coalition of the SPD, the Green Party and the FDP following the 2021 federal elections, Miersch led his party's delegation in the working group on environmental policy; his co-chairs from the other parties were Oliver Krischer and Lukas Köhler.

== Other activities ==
- Business Forum of the Social Democratic Party of Germany, Member of the Political Advisory Board (since 2018)
- Evangelical Church in Germany (EKD), Member of the Committee on Sustainable Development (since 2016)
- Deutsche Bundesstiftung Umwelt (DBU), Member of the Board of Trustees (since 2009)
- Bundesstiftung Magnus Hirschfeld, Substitute Member of the Board of Trustees (since 2009)
- Deutsche Umweltstiftung, Member of the Advisory Board
- spw – Zeitschrift für sozialistische Politik und Wirtschaft, Member of the Editorial Board
- Nature and Biodiversity Conservation Union (NABU), Member
- Young Men's Christian Association (YMCA), Member

== Personal life ==
Miersch is openly homosexual and married to his partner.
