= Kirsten Lühmann =

German politician

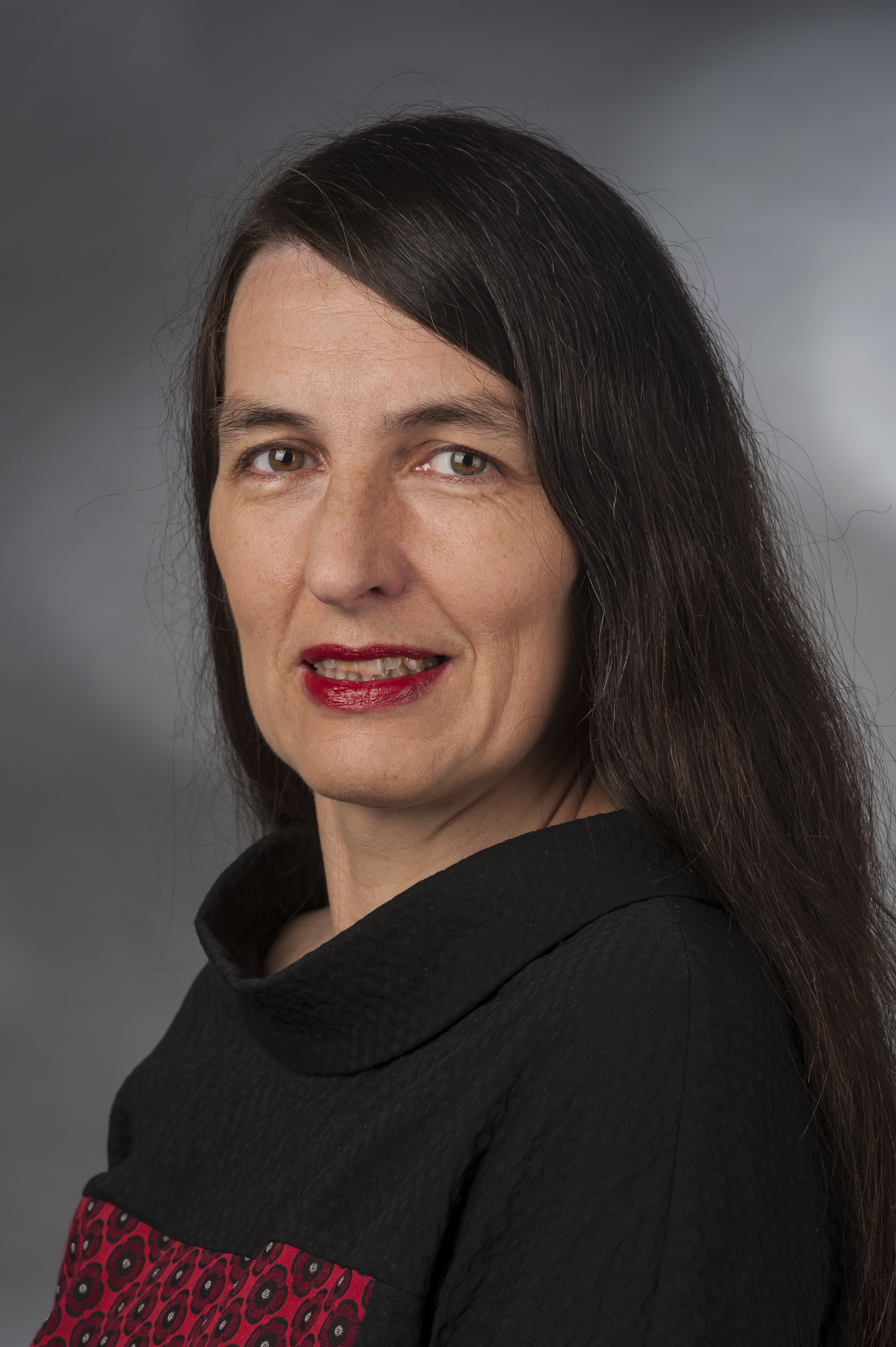

Member of the Bundestag
- Incumbent
- Assumed office 2009

Personal details
- Born: 28 April 1964 (age 62) Oldenburg, Germany
- Party: SPD

Kirsten Lühmann (born 1964) is a German politician of the Social Democratic Party (SPD), deputy federal chairwoman of the German Civil Service Federation and, since the German federal elections of 2009, a member of parliament for the SPD.

== Early life and education ==
Lühmann was born on 28 April 1964 in Oldenburg in North Germany. She lives in Hermannsburg in the district of Celle. In 1983 she completed her A levels (Abitur) and became the first policewoman to join the Lower Saxony Police, rising to the rank of senior police commissioner (Polizeioberkommissarin).

== Political career ==
Lühmann is the deputy chairman of the SPD sub-district of Celle, chairman of the SPD party on Celle District Council and a member of the parish council of Hermannsburg. In the federal elections of 2009, she ran for the constituency of Celle – Uelzen as the successor to Peter Struck who, after 29 years in the Bundestag, no longer wished to seek re-election. With 32.3% of the vote, she was unable to secure the direct mandate and the constituency went to Henning Otte of the CDU. However, Lühmann entered the Bundestag by getting onto the state list.

Since joining the Bundestag, Lühmann's focus has been on employment and social politics and an energy policy firmly committed to ending nuclear power. She has been a member of the Committee on Transport since 2009. She is also an alternate member of the Committee on Home Affairs; most notably, she refuses to support the deployment of the Bundeswehr at home. In 2014, she became the SPD parliamentary group's spokeswoman for transport and digital infrastructure. In addition to her committee assignments, she has been a member of the German delegation to the Franco-German Parliamentary Assembly since 2019.

Since 2014, Lühmann has been part of the parliamentary group’s leadership under chairman Thomas Oppermann. Within the parliamentary group, she was a member of the working group on gender equality and the Afghanistan/Pakistan task force from 2009 to 2013.

In the negotiations to form a coalition government under the leadership of Chancellor Angela Merkel following the 2017 federal elections, Lührmann was part of the working group on transport and infrastructure, led by Michael Kretschmer, Alexander Dobrindt and Sören Bartol.

In addition to her parliamentary work, Lühmann is the deputy federal chairwoman of the German Civil Service Federation (DBB Beamtenbund und Tarifunion), since 1998 a member of the executive board of the women's delegation (Bundesfrauenvertretung) to the Federation and a member of the federal executive board of the Commission for Staff and Worker Participation (Bundeshauptvorstandskommission Personalvertretung und Mitbestimmung), as well as a member of the Experts' Commission for Internal Security. Furthermore, she is the deputy chairman of the German Police Union in Lower Saxony. At the same time she belongs to the European Confederation of Independent Trade Unions, where since 2005 she has been chairman of the Special Commission for Women's Rights and Sexual Equality (FEMM). She is also a member of the Special Commission for Employment and Social Affairs (SOC). She represents the dbb on the executive board of the network, the European Movement in Germany.

In 2019, Lührmann announced her candidacy for the position as chair of the German Police Trade Union. In August 2020, she also announced that she would not stand in the 2021 federal elections but instead resign from active politics by the end of the parliamentary term.

== Other activities (selection) ==
=== Regulatory agencies ===
- Federal Network Agency for Electricity, Gas, Telecommunications, Posts and Railway (BNetzA), Alternate Member of the Rail Infrastructure Advisory Council (since 2014)

=== Corporate boards ===
- Deutsche Bahn, Member of the Supervisory Board (since 2015)
- Deutsche Flugsicherung (DFS), Member of the Advisory Board
- Nürnberger Beamten Lebensversicherung AG, Member of the Supervisory Board

=== Non-profit organizations ===
- Business Forum of the Social Democratic Party of Germany, Member of the Political Advisory Board (since 2018)
- European Network of Policewomen (ENP), Member
- German Military Reserve Association, Member
- German War Graves Commission (VDK), Member
- International Association of Women Police (IAWP), Member

== Personal life ==
Lühmann has been married since 1988 and has three daughters.
