= Maria Flachsbarth =

German politician and vet (born 1963)

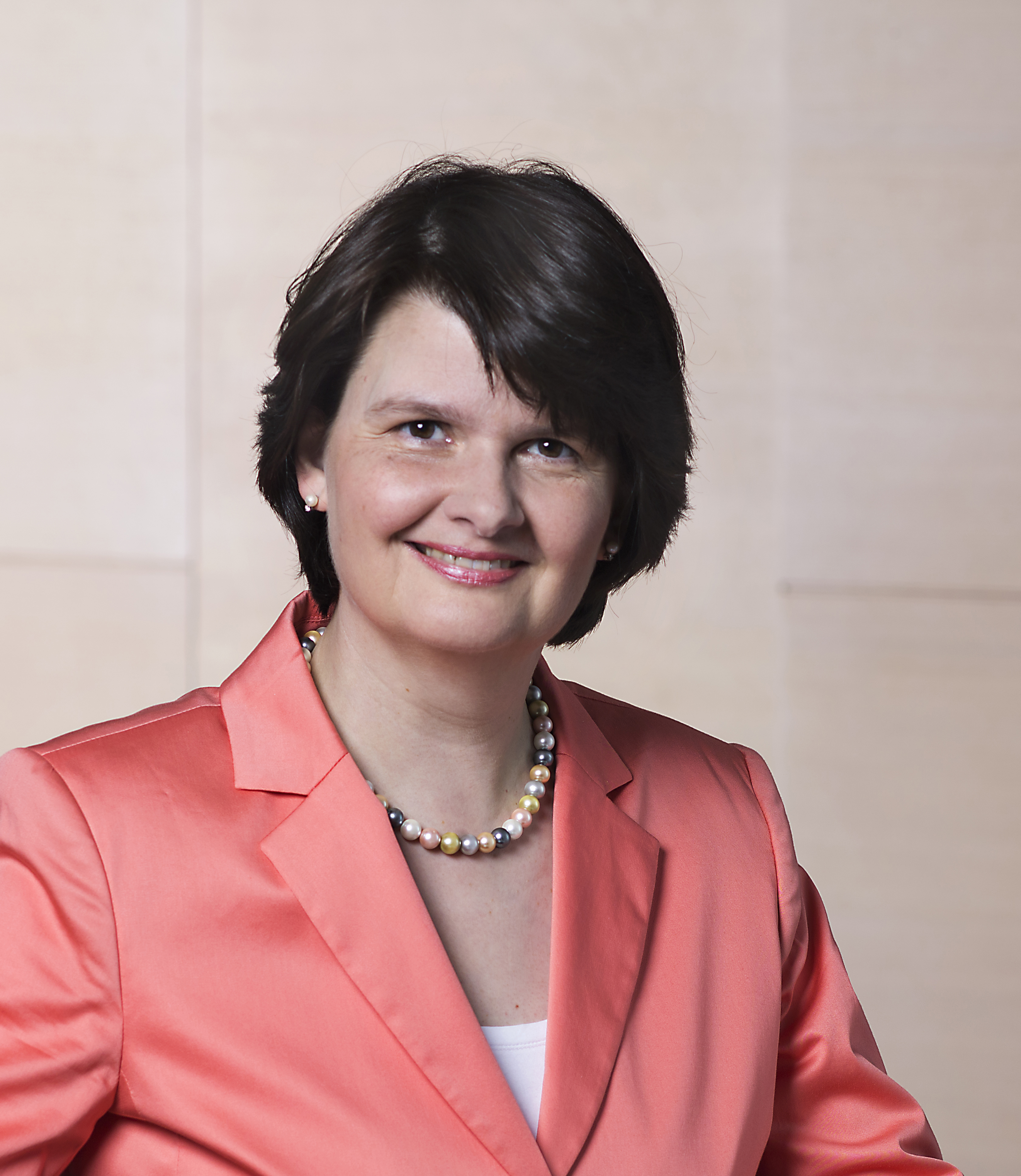

Member of the Bundestag
- In office 2002–2021

Personal details
- Born: 2 June 1963 (age 63) Lünen, Lower Saxony, West Germany
- Party: CDU
- Children: 2
- Occupation: Politician; veterinarian

Maria Franziska Flachsbarth (née Füßmann; born 2 June 1963) is a German veterinarian and politician of the Christian Democratic Union of Germany (CDU) who served as Parliamentary State Secretary in the Federal Ministry for Economic Cooperation and Development in the fourth coalition government of Chancellor Angela Merkel from 2018 to 2021. Since 2011, she has also served as the president of the German Catholic Women's Association.

== Early life and education ==
Flachsbarth was born 1963 in Lünen, and studied veterinary medicine at the University of Veterinary Medicine Hanover. On a scholarship of the Konrad Adenauer Foundation, she received her PhD in 1990, with a thesis on cats.

== Political career ==
=== Early beginnings ===
Flachsbarth joined the Young Union in 1975, before also becoming a member of the CDU in 1991.

=== Member of the German Parliament, 2002–2021 ===
Flachsbarth first became a member of the German Bundestag in the 2002 elections, representing the Hanover Land ll constituency. From 2002 until 2013, she served on the Committee on the Environment, Nature Conservation, Building, and Nuclear Safety. In this capacity, she was her parliamentary group's rapporteur on the management of high-level nuclear waste at the Asse II mine, among others. She also joined the parliament's Council of Elders, which – among other duties – determines daily legislative agenda items and assigns committee chairperson, based on party representation.

Ahead of the 2005 state elections in Schleswig-Holstein, Peter Harry Carstensen included Flachsbarth in his shadow cabinet for the Christian Democrats' campaign to unseat incumbent Heide Simonis as Minister-President. During the campaign, Flachsbarth served as shadow minister for social affairs.

Within her CDU/CSU parliamentary group, Flachsbarth co-ordinated relations with churches and religious communities from 2009 until 2013.

In the negotiations to form a Grand Coalition of Chancellor Angela Merkel's Christian Democrats (CDU, together with the Bavarian CSU) and the Social Democrats (SPD) following the 2013 federal elections, Flachsbarth was part of the CDU/CSU delegation in the working group on energy policy, led by Peter Altmaier and Hannelore Kraft. From 2014 to 2018, Flachsbarth served as Parliamentary State Secretary at the Federal Ministry of Food and Agriculture, under the leadership of minister Christian Schmidt, in Merkel's third cabinet. During that time, she unsuccessfully ran for the office of president of the Central Committee of German Catholics (ZdK) in 2015; the post instead went to Thomas Sternberg.

In the negotiations to form a coalition government following the 2017 federal elections, Flachsbarth was part of the working group on agriculture, led by Julia Klöckner, Christian Schmidt, and Anke Rehlinger. With the formation of the fourth Grand Coalition under Merkel, in 2018, Flachsbarth became – alongside Norbert Barthle – one of two Parliamentary State Secretaries at the Federal Ministry of Economic Cooperation and Development, this time under the leadership of minister Gerd Müller.

In May 2020, Flachsbarth announced that she would not stand in the 2021 federal elections, but instead resign from active politics by the end of the parliamentary term.

=== Role in state politics ===
Since 2006, Flachsbarth has been the deputy chairwoman of the CDU in Lower Saxony, under the leadership of successive chairmen Christian Wulff (2006-2008), David McAllister (2008-2016), and Bernd Althusmann (since 2016).

Following the 2017 state elections in Lower Saxony, Flachsbarth was part of the CDU team in the negotiations with Stephan Weil's Social Democrats on a coalition agreement.

== Other activities ==
=== International organizations ===
- African Development Bank (AfDB), Ex-Officio Member of the Board of Governors (2018–2021)

=== Corporate boards ===
- German Energy Agency (DENA), Ex-Officio Member of the Supervisory Board (2015-2018)

=== Non-profit organizations ===
- World Vision Germany, Member of the Board of Trustees (since 2021)
- Development and Peace Foundation (SEF), Member of the Board of Trustees (since 2019)
- Aid by Trade Foundation, Member of the Board of Trustees (since 2018)
- German Foundation for Peace Research (DSF), Ex-Officio Member of the Board (2018–2021)
- Central Committee of German Catholics (ZdK), Member (since 2011)
- German Catholic Women's Association (KFDB), President (since 2011)
- Norddeutscher Rundfunk (NDR), Member of the Broadcasting Council (2013-2018)
- German Renewable Energy Federation (BEE), Member of the Parliamentary Advisory Board (2009-2013)
- German Bishops' Conference, Member of the Working Group on Ecology (2009-2011)

== Political positions ==
In June 2017, Flachsbarth voted against Germany's introduction of same-sex marriage.

In 2019, Flachsbarth joined 14 members of her parliamentary group who, in an open letter, called for the party to rally around Merkel and party chairwoman Annegret Kramp-Karrenbauer, amid criticism voiced by conservatives Friedrich Merz and Roland Koch.

== Personal life ==
Flachsbarth is married, and has two children.
