= Federalism commission (Germany) =

Working group on constitutional politics

The federalism commission is a German commission composed of members of the upper and lower houses. It has existed three times in German history.

== History ==
=== The independent Federalism commission 1991-1992 ===
After the German reunification of Germany the Bundesrat decided on the 20 of June 1991 to create a commission composed of an equal number of members of all represented parties of the two legislative houses. Its objective was to examine and propose which federal authorities should be introduced into the newly reunified federal states. It was presided by Bernhard Vogel (politician).

=== Commission on the modernization of the federal state (2003-2004) ===
The commission was created to reform the division of powers between federal and state authorities. The reform was considered necessary due to the fact that up to 60% of federally voted laws needed to be approved by the federal states through a vote of the Bundesrat. The commission was composed of 16 members of the Bundestag and 16 members of the Bundesrat and was presided by co-presidents. Edmund Stoiber representing the states and Franz Münterfering representing the Federation. In addition to these full members there were also non-voting representatives of the federal government, the state legislatures, local government and academics. Although not initially accepted by the regional states, the proposals (except reform of financial relations) were finally voted by a 2/3 majority on 1 September 2006.

=== Bundestag and Bundesrat Commission on the modernization of financial relations between federal and state governments (Federalism commission II 2007 - 2009) ===
The commission was constituted to agree reforms that could initially not be agreed by the 2003 commission.;

- Financial relations between state and regions: Division of tax income between the parties, responsibilities of federal government and laws impacting the finances of regional states and municipal government.
- reform of the 30 billion euro Financial equalization payments from rich to poor regional states.
- Processes to control federal debt growth

The commission was composed of 16 members of each of the two legislative assemblies. The co-presidents were Peter Struck for the Bundestag and Günther Oettinger for the Bundesrat. The first meeting was held on 8 March 2007, and the final meeting in March 2009.

== See also ==
- Federalism in Germany
- Politics of Germany
