= Katensen, Uetze =

Katensen
- Ortsteil of Uetze
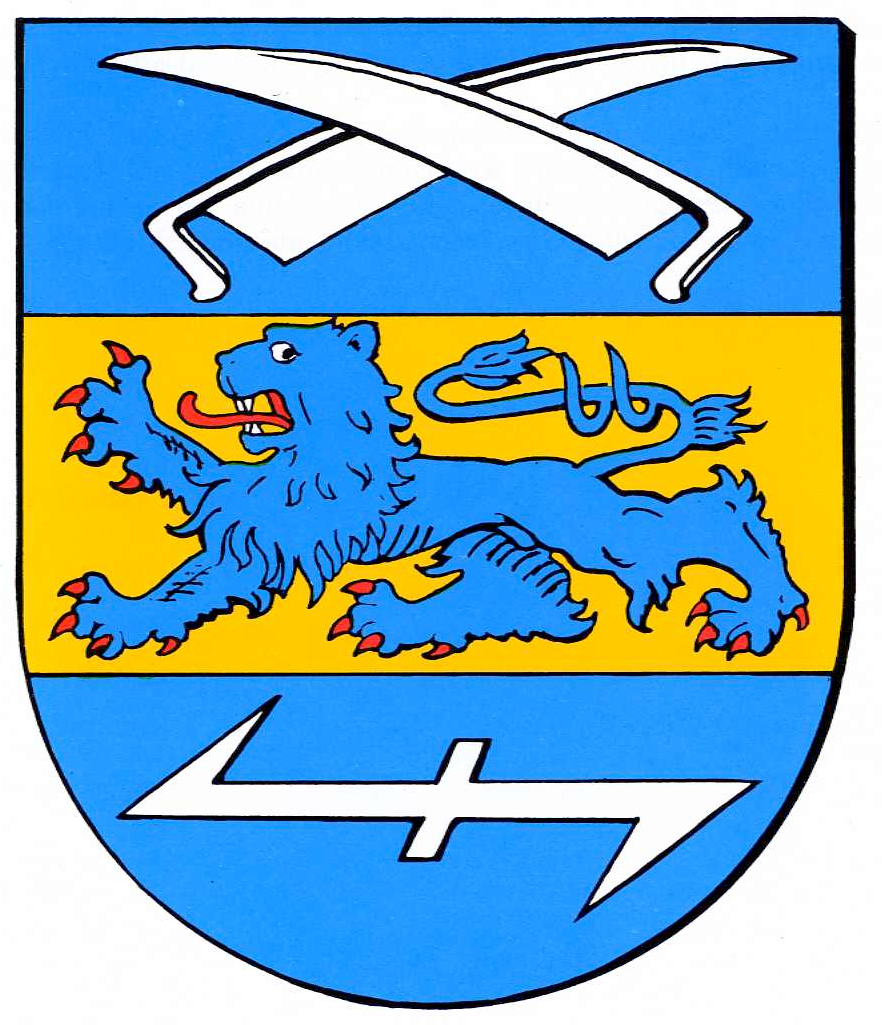
- Coat of arms
- Interactive map of Katensen
- Location within Germany Location within Lower Saxony
- Coordinates: 52°26′07″N 10°10′06″E
- Country: Germany
- State: Lower Saxony
- District: Hanover
- Municipality: Uetze
- First mentioned: 1265

Government
  - Mayor: Olaf Reese
- Elevation: 56 m (184 ft)

Population (2021)
  - Total: 763
- Time zone: UTC+01:00 (CET)
  - Summer (DST): UTC+02:00 (CEST)
- Postal codes: 31311
- Dialling codes: 05173
- Vehicle registration: H
- Website: katensen.de

Katensen is a small village in Lower Saxony that is part of the town Uetze, the village is located about 30 km East of Hanover. not to be confused with Katensen (Offen)

== History ==
Katensen was first recorded in 1265 in the Document Bishop Otto of Hildesheim, in September 2015 it celebrated its 750th Birthday.

== Coat of Arms ==
The coat of arms is divided into three parts. In the upper blue field it contains two crossed scythes (as a reference to agriculture), below that in a yellow field a blue red-armored Brunswick lion (because of the affiliation to the former Brunswick-Lüneburg region). The final part is a blue field rounded off towards the bottom with a silver old Germanic wolf's tang as a reminder of the affiliation to the district of Burgdorf.

== History ==
Inhabitants
Year	Inhabitants
2021	763 (+2)
2020	761
2017	789 (-2)

== Culture and sights ==
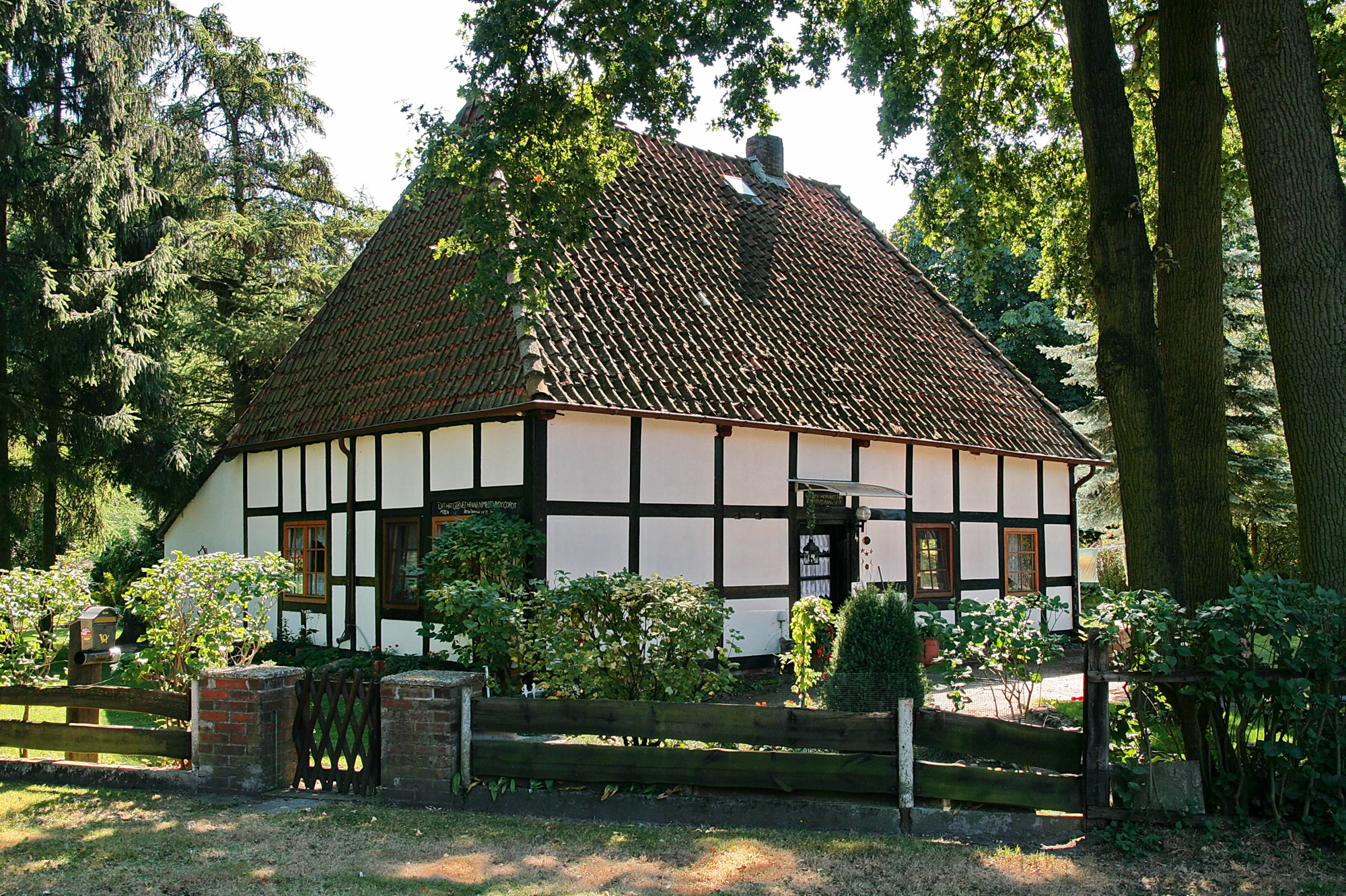
A Traditional Half Timered House

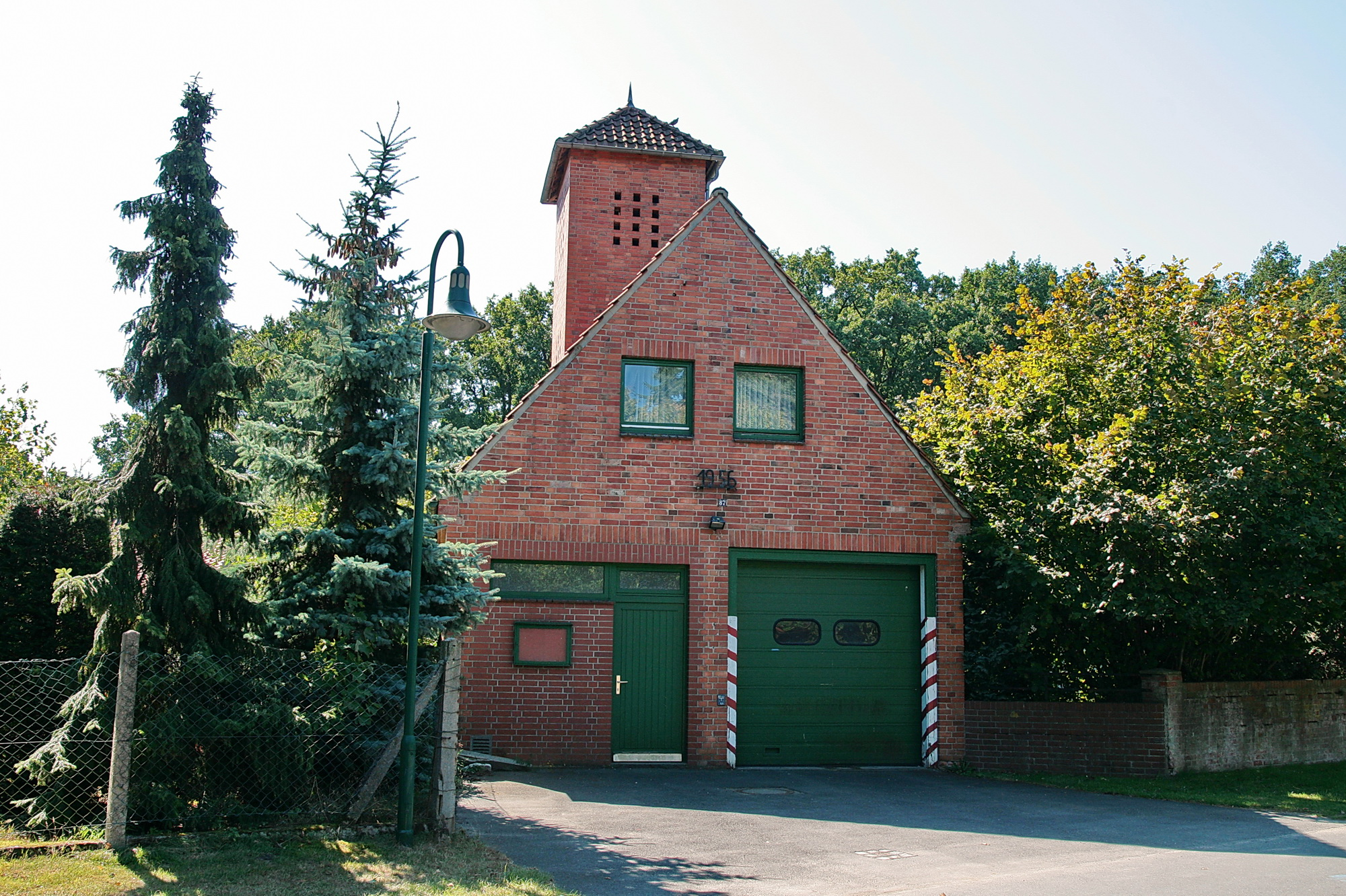
Old Firestation

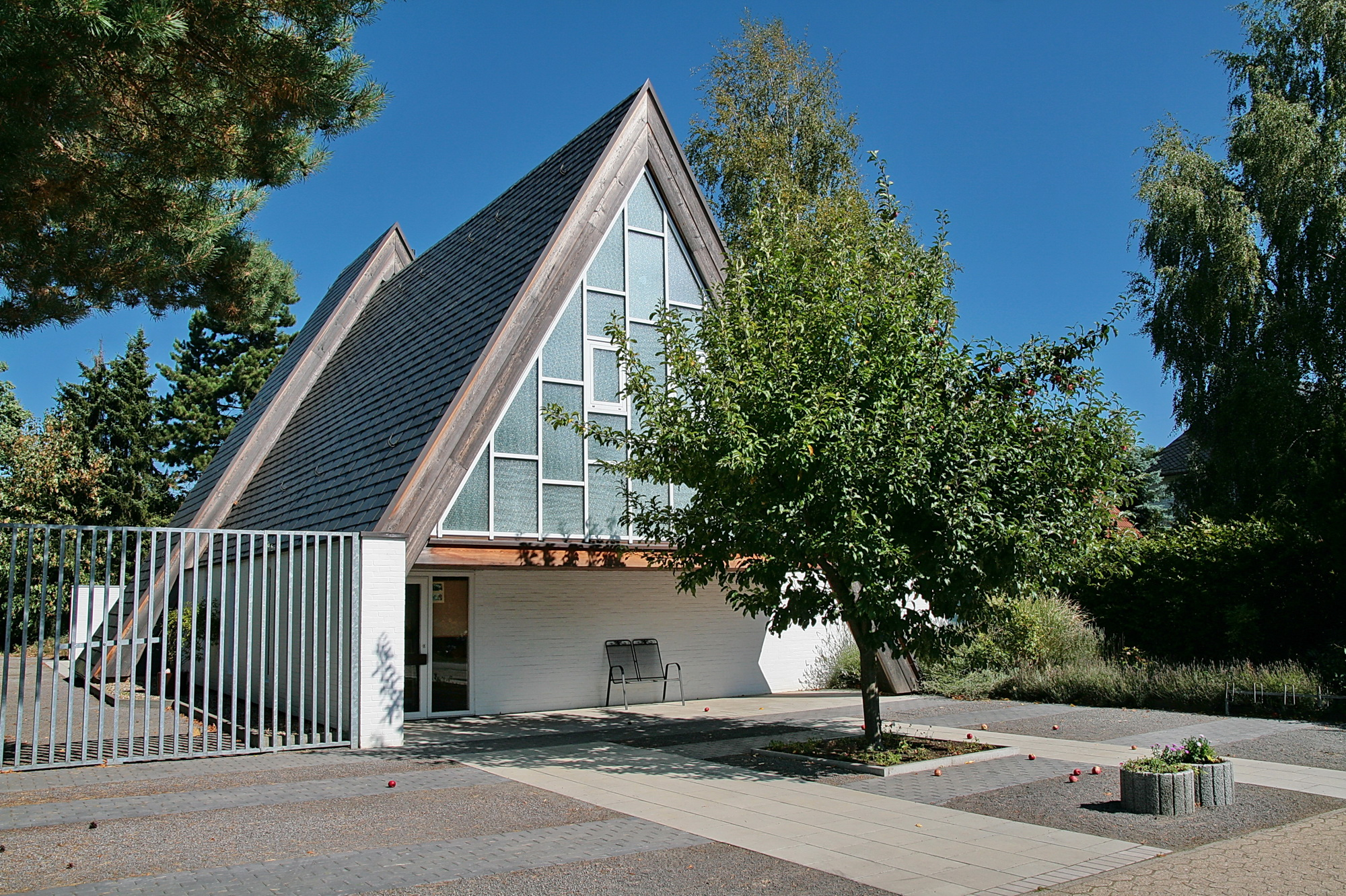
Local Church

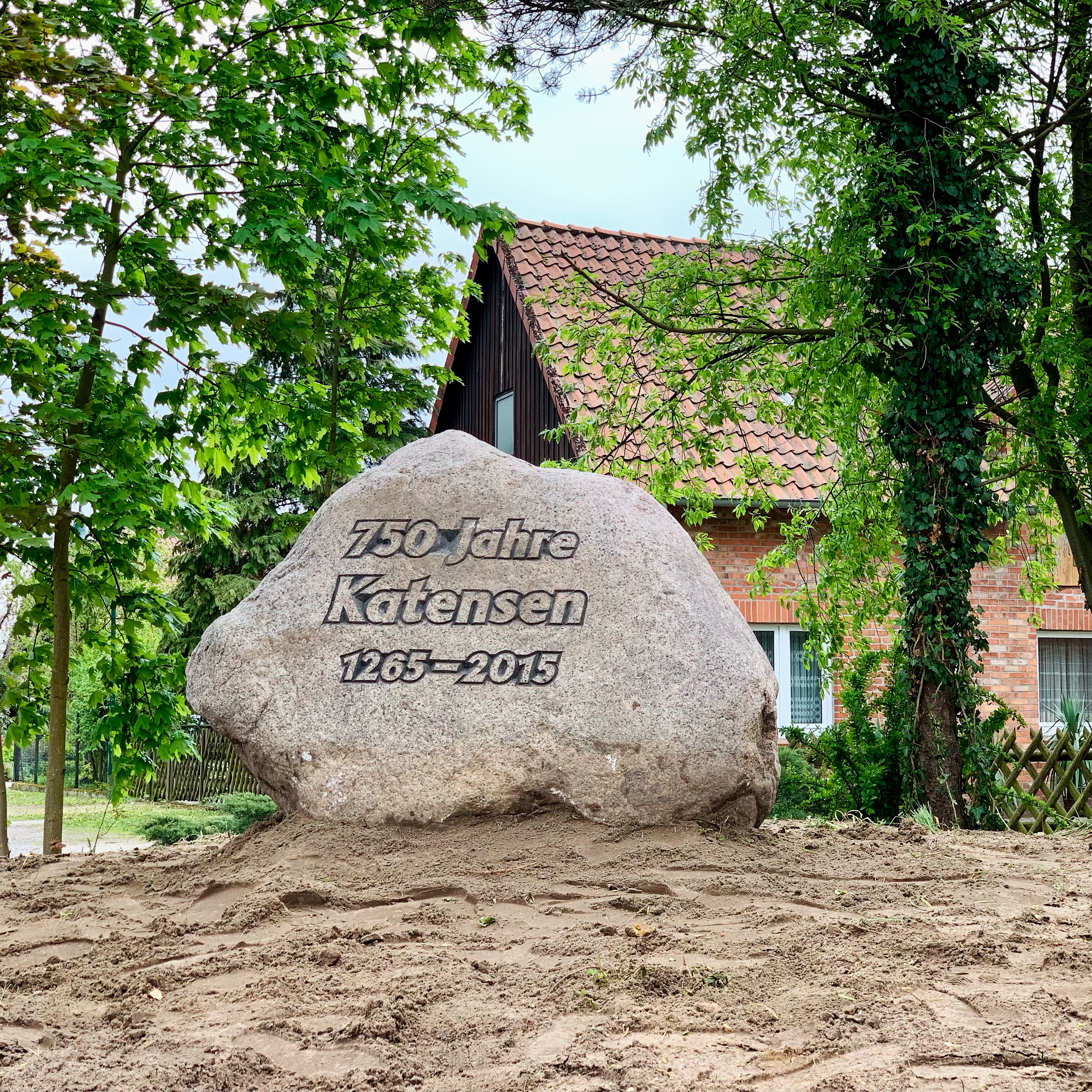
750 Memorial Stone

== Clubs ==
Sports Club - TSV Katensen - http://www.tsv-katensen.de/

Shooting Club - Schützenverein - http://www.sv-katensen.de/

Volunteer fire department inc. Youth - Freiwilligen Feuerwehr - http://www.feuerwehr-katensen.de/

Horse Riding Club - Reit- und Fahrverein - http://www.rv-uetze.de/

== Transport ==
=== Airport ===
Katensen has a small private airport with a Grass Landing strip suitable for light aircraft

=== Bus ===
There are 2 Bus Stops in the Village, which is on the Line 950, operated by GVH

=== Train ===
The closest train station to Katensen is in the Village of Dollbergen, the Train Station is on the Berlin-Lehrte line. The RE30 route links the City of Wolfsburg to the east and Hanover to the West and is operated by the company Metronom

== Politics ==
=== Local Council ===
The local council of Katensen consists of five councillors of the following parties:

- Freie Wählergemeinschaft Katensen: 5 seats

=== Mayor ===
The Town Mayor is Olaf Reese from the party "Freie Wählergemeinschaft Katensen"
