= Philipp von Bismarck =

German politician (1913–2006)

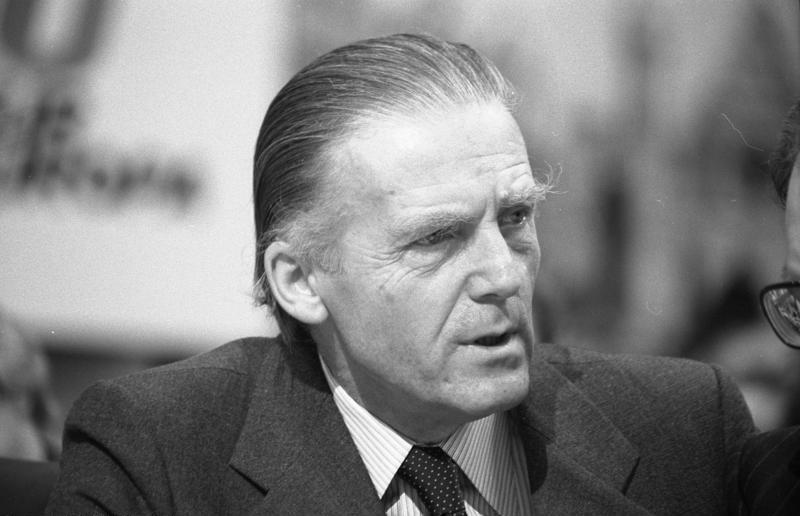
- Philipp von Bismarck at the 1978 CDU federal party conference

Member of the European Parliament; for Germany
- In office 10 June 1979 – 15 June 1989
- Preceded by: Constituency established
- Succeeded by: Multi-member district

Member of the Bundestag; from Lower Saxony
- In office 20 October 1969 – 6 September 1979
- Preceded by: Arthur Enk
- Succeeded by: Martin Oldenstädt
- Constituency: Gifhorn (1969–1972); State list (1972–1976); Gifhorn (1976–1979)

Personal details
- Born: 19 August 1913 Jarchlin, Pomerania, Germany
- Died: 20 July 2006 (aged 92) Obernholz, Germany
- Party: Christian Democratic Union
- Children: 6
- Relatives: Bismarck family

Philipp von Bismarck (19 August 1913 – 20 July 2006) was a German farmer and politician of the Christian Democratic Union (CDU) and former member of the German Bundestag.

== Political career ==
He was elected to the German Bundestag in 1969 for the CDU via a direct mandate in the Gifhorn constituency of Lower Saxony and was a member of the German Bundestag from 20 October 1969 until his resignation on 6 September 1979 (three terms). On 10 June 1979, Bismarck was for the first time elected directly by the citizens to the European Parliament, of which he had been a member since 1978 (elected by the Bundestag).

From 1970 to 1983 he was Chairman of the CDU Economic Council, whose Honorary Chairman he subsequently became.

== Literature ==
Herbst, Ludolf; Jahn, Bruno (2002). Vierhaus, Rudolf (ed.). Biographisches Handbuch der Mitglieder des Deutschen Bundestages. 1949–2002 [Biographical Handbook of the Members of the German Bundestag. 1949–2002] (in German). München: De Gruyter - De Gruyter Saur. p. 1715. ISBN 978-3-11-184511-1.
