= Hans Jahn =

German politician (1885–1960)

Member of the Bundestag; for Hannover-Land
- In office 7 September 1949 – 10 July 1960
- Preceded by: Constituency established
- Succeeded by: Ernst Rodiek

Personal details
- Born: 29 August 1885 Hartha, Germany
- Died: 10 July 1960 (aged 74) Frankfurt, West Germany
- Party: Social Democratic

Johannes Jahn (29 August 1885 – 10 July 1960) was a German trade unionist, politician and anti-Nazi activist.

Jahn became a smelter, and then in 1909 began working for a trade union. By 1930, he was serving on the national executive of the United Union of German Railway Workers, and was an outspoken opponent of the Nazis. He opposed the dissolution of the unions in 1933, and managed to salvage a list of former union members in the Ruhr. This enabled him to set up a labour resistance group in the area, working closely with the International Transport Workers' Federation (ITF).

Jahn was arrested three times by the Nazis, the last being in 1935, after they discovered his resistance group. He fled to Prague, then on to Amsterdam, where from 1936 to 1938, he published a journal for German railway workers in opposition to the Nazis. In 1940, he escaped to London, travelling via Spain and Portugal, where he set up a group of German trade unionists which later affiliated to the National Group of German Labor Unionists in Britain, and also served on the council of the ITF.

At the end of World War II, Jahn returned to Germany, and was a leading figure in reconstructing the trade unions. In 1949, he was elected as the first president of the new German Railwaymen's Federation, serving until 1958. From 1956, he was president of the ITF, while from 1949 he served in the Bundestag, representing Hannover-Land for the Social Democratic Party of Germany.

Trade union offices
Preceded by New position	President of the German Railwaymen's Federation; 1949–1958	Succeeded by Philipp Seibert
Preceded by Arthur Deakin	President of the International Transport Workers' Federation; 1956–1958	Succeeded by Frank Cousins
