= Peter Struck (politician) =

German politician (1943–2012)

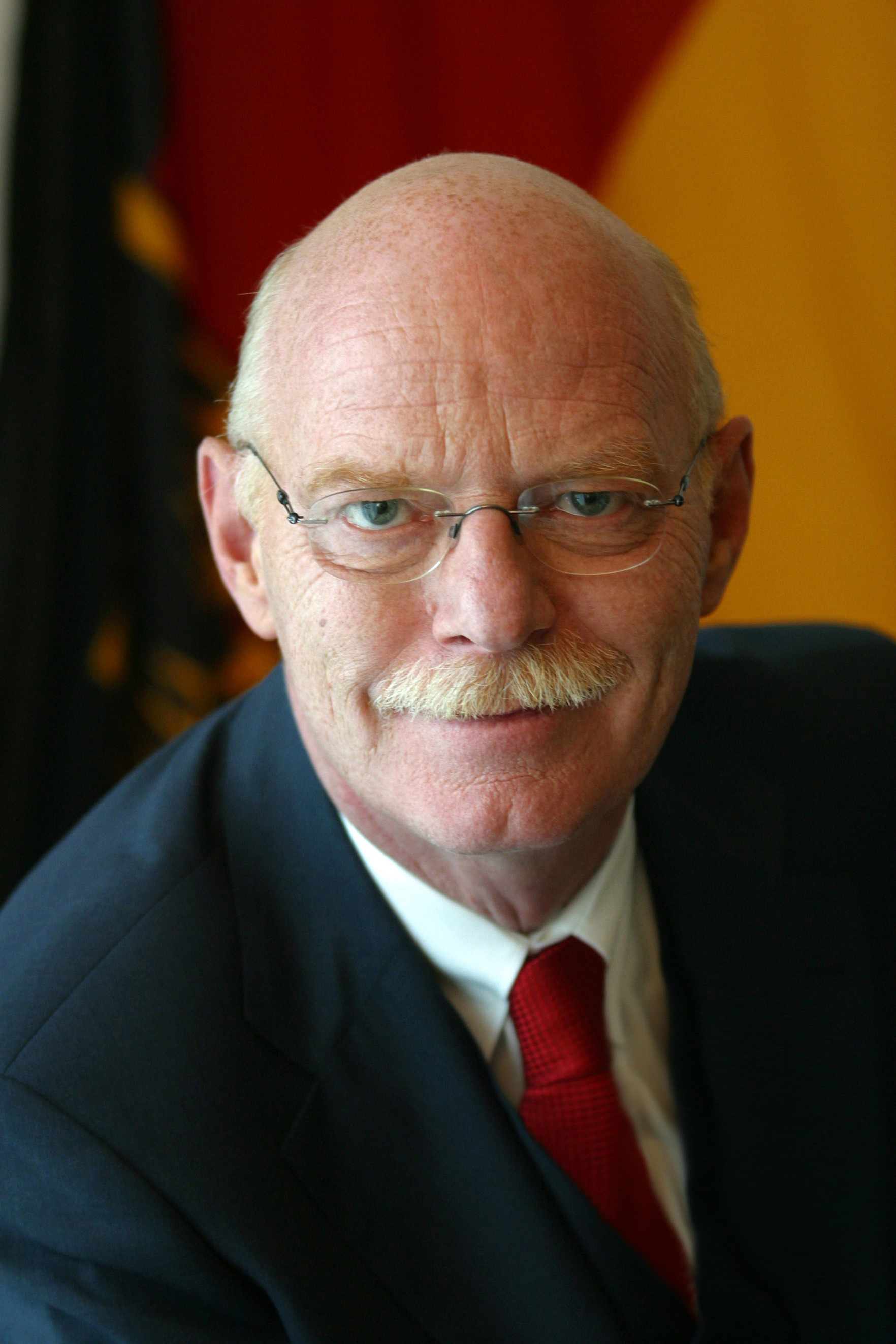
- Struck in 2010

Leader of the Social Democratic Party in the Bundestag
- In office 22 November 2005 – 27 September 2009
- Chief Whip: Olaf Scholz; Thomas Oppermann
- Preceded by: Franz Müntefering
- Succeeded by: Frank-Walter Steinmeier
- In office 27 October 1998 – 19 July 2002
- Chief Whip: Wilhelm Schmidt
- Preceded by: Rudolf Scharping
- Succeeded by: Ludwig Stiegler

Minister of Defence
- In office 19 July 2002 – 22 November 2005
- Chancellor: Gerhard Schröder
- Preceded by: Rudolf Scharping
- Succeeded by: Franz-Josef Jung

Member of the Bundestag; from Lower Saxony
- In office 4 November 1980 – 27 October 2009
- Preceded by: Multi-member district
- Succeeded by: Henning Otte
- Constituency: State list (1980–1998); Celle – Uelzen (1998–2009)

Personal details
- Born: 24 January 1943 Göttingen, Germany
- Died: 19 December 2012 (aged 69) Berlin, Germany
- Party: Social Democratic
- Children: 3
- Education: University of Göttingen; University of Hamburg
- Profession: Lawyer
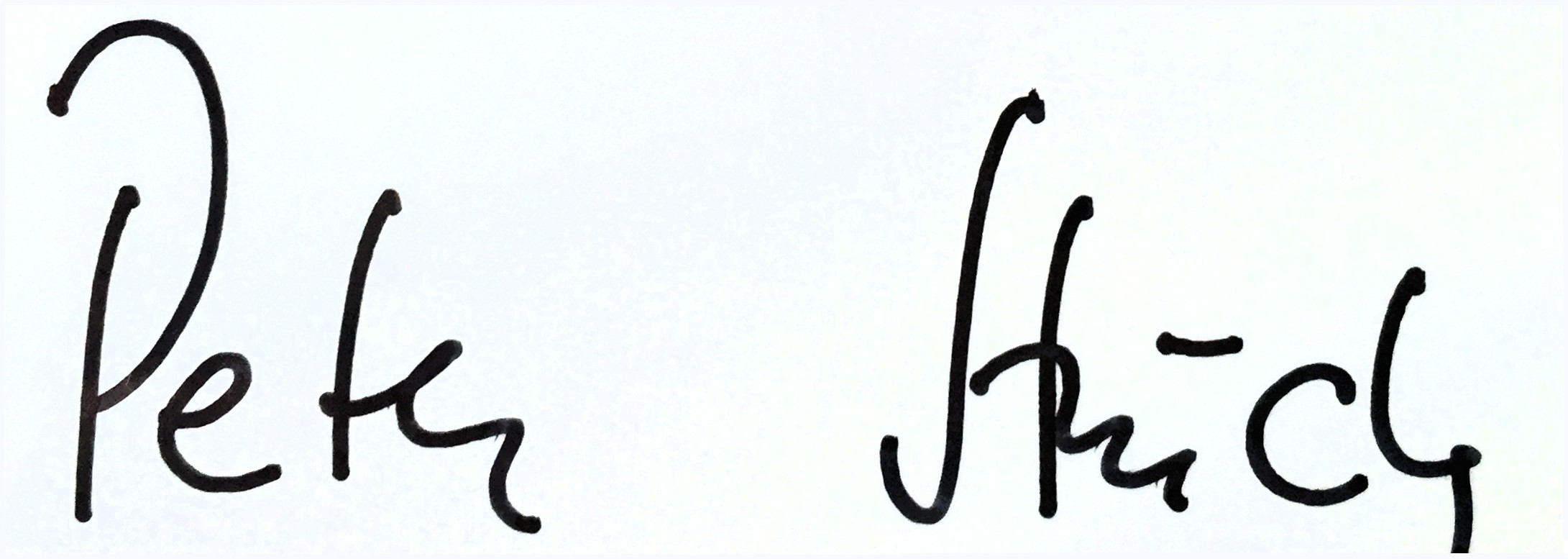
- Signature

Peter Struck (24 January 1943 – 19 December 2012) was the German Minister of Defence under chancellor Gerhard Schröder from 2002 to 2005. A lawyer, Struck was a member of the Social Democratic Party.

== Education ==
- 1962: Abitur
- 1964: Member of the SPD

Struck studied law at the universities of Göttingen and Hamburg. In 1971 he graduated to Dr. iur. (Doctor of Laws).

== Political career ==
Peter Struck was a member of the Bundestag from 1980 until 2009. He first became a member of the Bundestag in the 1980 West German elections, via the party list, for the constituency of Celle-Uelzen. Due to his growing popularity, in the years 1998, 2002 and 2005, Struck was directly elected. From 1990 to 1998 he was whip (Parlamentarischer Geschäftsführer) of the SPD parliamentary group. From 1998 to 2002 he was chairman of the SPD parliamentary group.

=== Federal Minister of Defence (2002–2005) ===
In 2002 Struck succeeded Rudolf Scharping as Federal Minister of Defence, and served in that position until 2005.

During Struck's tenure, Germany was trying to revamp its military into a nimbler fighting force capable of responding to smaller, regional conflicts. While being a strong supporter of conscription, Struck announced in 2003 that Germany would reduce its military by more than 10 percent by 2010, leaving 250,000 troops. Also, he ordered a reduction in Germany's inventory of heavy Leopard 2 tanks from almost 2,000 to 350. At the time, he said the cuts were necessary because of strained finances and a need to adapt to new security needs; in 2003, he had to work with a defence budget of a mere 1.48 percent of Germany's gross domestic product, compared with the 2 percent average of his European Union counterparts. Under Struck's plan, the military's civilian work force was to be reduced by 45,000, to 75,000, and as many as 100 military bases closed.

During his time at the Defence Ministry, Struck oversaw the early years of Germany's engagement in Afghanistan, famously coining the phrase that "German security is being defended in the Hindu Kush". In 2004, he said “there will be a clear no from the German side” to any request to place the NATO-led International Security Assistance Force and Operation Enduring Freedom under a unified command, expressing fears a unified command could be a step towards merging the two forces and that political opposition and military dangers could increase if their soldiers were identified with the US-led coalition.

After Germany joined with France in April 2003 to announce the creation of a European Union defense group with a military planning unit separate from NATO, Struck later held that no separate headquarters was necessary and that a planning staff for eventual operations under solely European auspices should be attached to NATO.

In 2003, Struck dismissed General Reinhard Günzel, the commander of a German special forces army unit, after he praised Martin Hohmann, a conservative member of Parliament, for a speech that had been widely criticized as anti-Semitic; Struck called Günzel a "lone, confused general who agreed with an even more confused statement."

After accusations began appearing in the German press that conscripts in the German Army had been physically abused by trainers at some of the country's army bases, Struck announced in December 2004 that 30 or 40 trainers were being investigated.

Following a 2004 trip to the Middle East and the Horn of Africa, Struck was hospitalized with a mild stroke.

=== Chairman of the SPD Parliamentary Group (2005–2009) ===
After the 2005 elections, Struck became Fraktionschef (chairman) of the SPD parliamentary group once again, until his retirement in 2009.

Between 2007 and 2009, Struck served as co-chair (alongside Günther Oettinger) of the Second Commission on the modernization of the federal state (Föderalismuskommission II), which had been established to reform the division of powers between federal and state authorities in Germany.

After retiring from active politics following the 2009 elections, Struck served as chairman of the Friedrich Ebert Foundation, a political think tank with connections to the SPD.

== Death ==
Struck suffered from poor health in the last several years of his career and died of a heart attack in the Charité hospital in Berlin on 19 December 2012. Funeral guests included the President of the Bundestag, Norbert Lammert, former chancellors Helmut Schmidt and Gerhard Schröder, the Minister-President of North Rhine-Westphalia Hannelore Kraft, SPD chairman Sigmar Gabriel, former Finance Minister Peer Steinbrück, and the chairman of the CDU/CSU parliamentary group in the Bundestag, Volker Kauder. Thomas de Maizière, Frank-Walter Steinmeier and General Wolfgang Schneiderhan gave eulogies.

== Controversies ==
When an elderly man was severely beaten up in Munich by two immigrant youths, Struck claimed that his political opponent, Roland Koch, was probably happy for the beating because now Koch could start a supposedly polemic discussion about problems with young violent immigrants. When Koch demanded an apology, Struck replied "Bite me!". In a Parliament debate some days later, Jürgen Gehb, CDU Speaker for law politics, said that "we will try to continue working with you, but with minimal contact to your backside".

At a 2002 meeting of NATO defense ministers in Warsaw, United States Secretary of Defense Donald H. Rumsfeld refused to meet Struck after Chancellor Gerhard Schröder had won narrow re-election in part by opposing the American-led Iraq War.

== Quotes ==
Peter Struck is famous for two quotes:

- "The security of the Federal Republic of Germany is being defended in the Hindu Kush too".

as Minister of Defence, reconciling the traditional view of the Bundeswehr as defence-only army with the problems of asymmetric war.

- "Legislation always obeys the First Struckian Law: No bill comes out of Parliament in the form it came into Parliament."

as SPD whip, rather humorously describing the legislative process.

== See also ==
- Politics of Germany

Political offices
Preceded by Rudolf Scharping	Defence Minister of Germany; 19 July 2002–22 November 2005	Succeeded by Franz Josef Jung
