= Wilhelm Brese =

German politician (1896–1994)

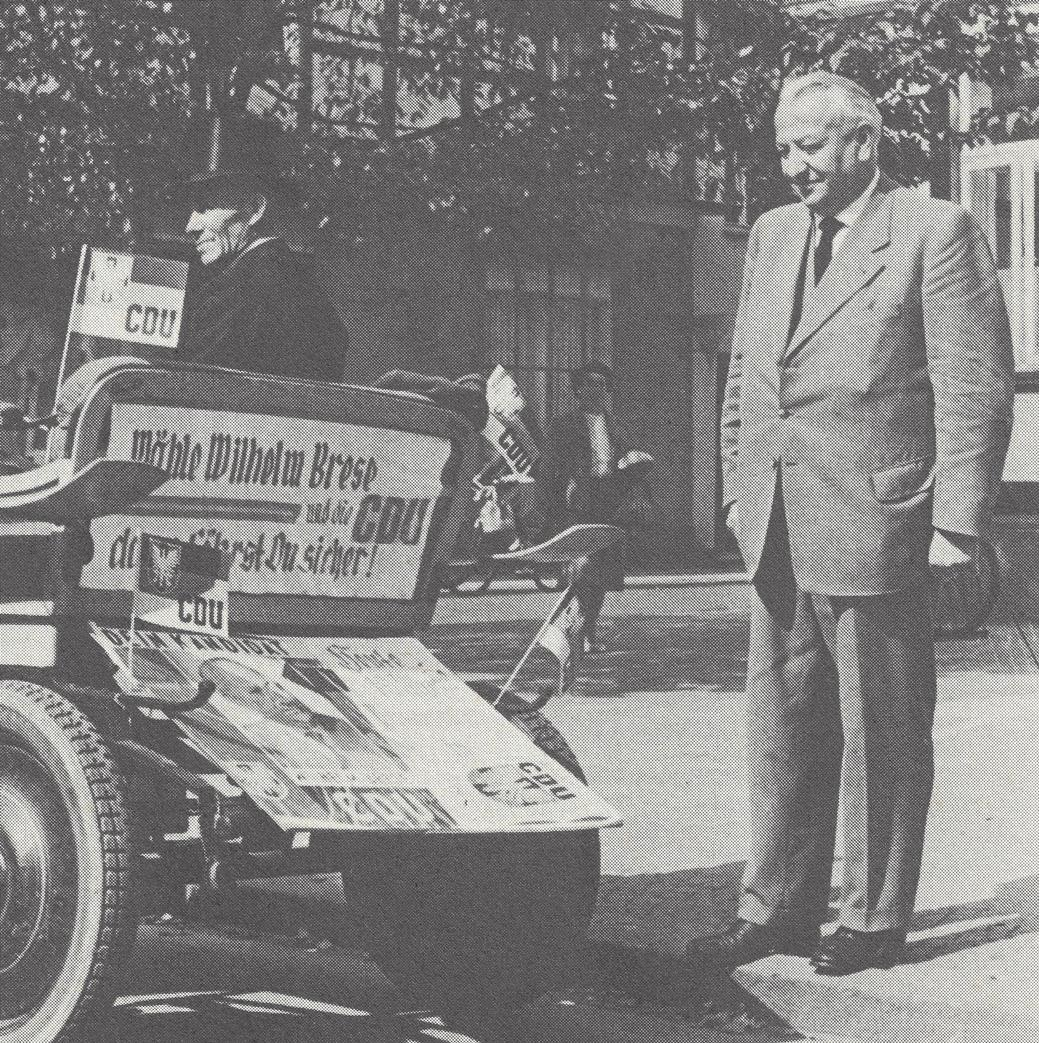
- Brese in 1952

Member of the Bundestag; from Lower Saxony
- In office 7 September 1949 – 20 October 1969
- Preceded by: Constituency established
- Succeeded by: Hans Hubrig
- Constituency: State list (1949–1961); Celle (1961–1969)

Personal details
- Born: 28 December 1896 Scharnhorst, Germany
- Died: 9 March 1994 (aged 97) Celle, Germany
- Party: Christian Democratic Union

Wilhelm Brese (28 December 1896 – 9 March 1994) was a German politician of the Christian Democratic Union (CDU) and former member of the German Bundestag.

== Political career ==
In 1945 Brese participated in the foundation of the CDU in the administrative district of Celle and was there from 1946 to 1966 also district chairman as well as temporarily district chairman in the district association Lüneburg. He was a member of the German Bundestag from 1949 to 1969. In the first three federal elections he entered parliament via the state list of the CDU in Lower Saxony. In 1961 and 1965 he won the direct mandate in the constituency of Celle.

== Literature ==
Herbst, Ludolf; Jahn, Bruno (2002). Vierhaus, Rudolf (ed.). Biographisches Handbuch der Mitglieder des Deutschen Bundestages. 1949–2002 [Biographical Handbook of the Members of the German Bundestag. 1949–2002] (in German). München: De Gruyter - De Gruyter Saur. p. 1715. ISBN 978-3-11-184511-1.
