= Margot Kalinke =

German politician (1909–1981)

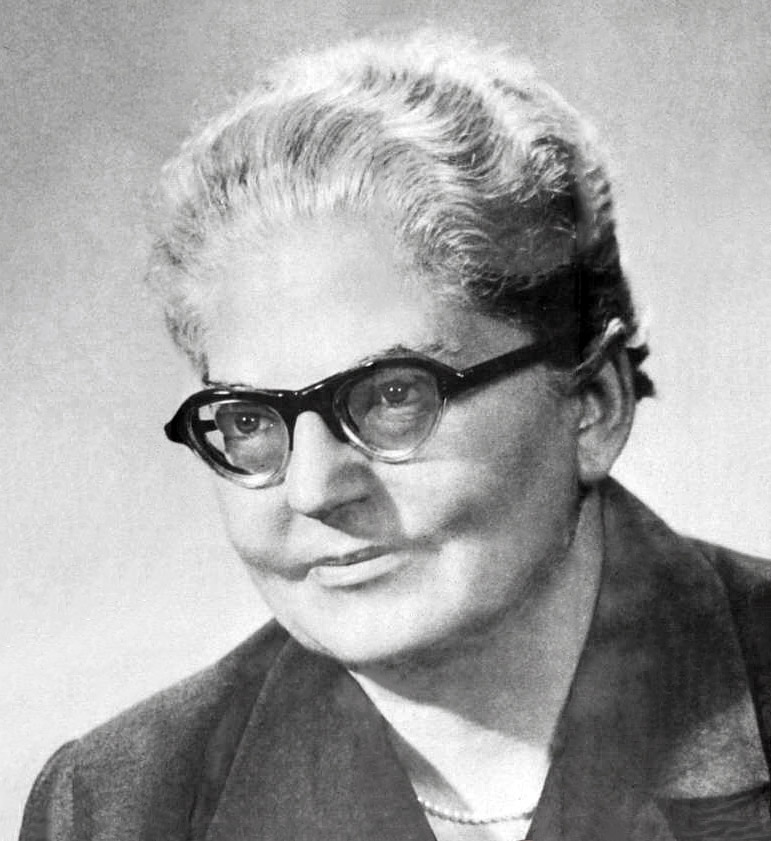
- Kalinke in 1965

Member of the Bundestag; from Lower Saxony
- In office 3 June 1955 – 13 December 1972
- Preceded by: Heinrich Hellwege
- Succeeded by: Multi-member district
- Constituency: Stade – Bremervörde (1955–1957); Celle (1957–1961); State list (1961–1972)
- In office 7 September 1949 – 6 October 1953
- Preceded by: Constituency established
- Succeeded by: Multi-member district
- Constituency: State list

Member of the Landtag of Lower Saxony
- In office May 1947 – 21 November 1949
- Preceded by: Multi-member district
- Succeeded by: Warner Bruns
- Constituency: State list

Personal details
- Born: 23 April 1909 Barcin, Poland
- Died: 25 November 1981 (aged 72) Munich, West Germany
- Party: Christian Democratic Union (after 1960)
- Other political affiliations: DP (1946–1960)

Margot Kalinke (23 April 1909 – 25 November 1981) was a German politician of the German Party and later the Christian Democratic Union (CDU).

== Early life and career ==
Margot Kalinke was Protestant by faith. She was expelled from Poland in 1925. From 1937 to 1952 she was managing director of a Angestelltenkrankenkasse ("Employee Health Insurance Company") in Hanover. In 1946 she became a founder of the Verband Weiblicher Angestellter (VWA, "Association of Women Employees") having been active in a predecessor organisation since 1933. From 1949 until her death, she was chair of the VWA. From 1953 to 1974, she was director of the Office of Private Health Insurance. She belonged briefly to the Executive Board of the Bundesversicherungsanstalt für Angestellte ("Federal Insuranceoffice for Employees") and in the 1950s, was a member of the Advisory Council for Reorganisation of Social Services at the office of the Ministry of Labour.

== Political career ==
From 1946 to 1949, Kalinke was a member of the Lower Saxony State Parliament. In 1947 and 1948, she was also a member of the Zonenbeirat ("Area Advisory Board").

From 1949 to 1953, and then from 1955 until 1972, she was a member of the German Bundestag, winning the election in the Celle constituency in 1957. Together with Ernst August Farke, she represented the Arbeitnehmerflügel ("Worker's Wing") of the German Party in parliament. From 1955 to 1957, she was deputy chair of the Bundestag Committee for Public Welfare. From 1957 until her exit from the party on 1 June 1960, she was vice chair of the German Party.

She joined the Christian Democratic Union on 20 September 1960, and from 1969 to 1971 she was Landesvorsitzende ("State President") of the women's union in Lower Saxony.

== Equal rights ==
Unlike most women in her party, Margot Kalinke opposed the "Stitch Ruling" (pertaining to the rights of the husband in marital disputes). Together with Elisabeth Schwarzhaupt she orchestrated support for an opposition amendment to her own party's bill. The Gesetz über die Gleichstellung von Mann und Frau auf dem Gebiet des bürgerlichen Rechts ("Law of Equality between Man and Woman in Civil Law") was enacted on 18 June 1957 without the Stitch Clause.
