= Burgdorf (district) =

- District
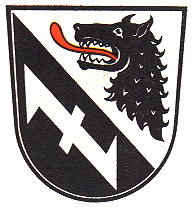
- Coat of arms

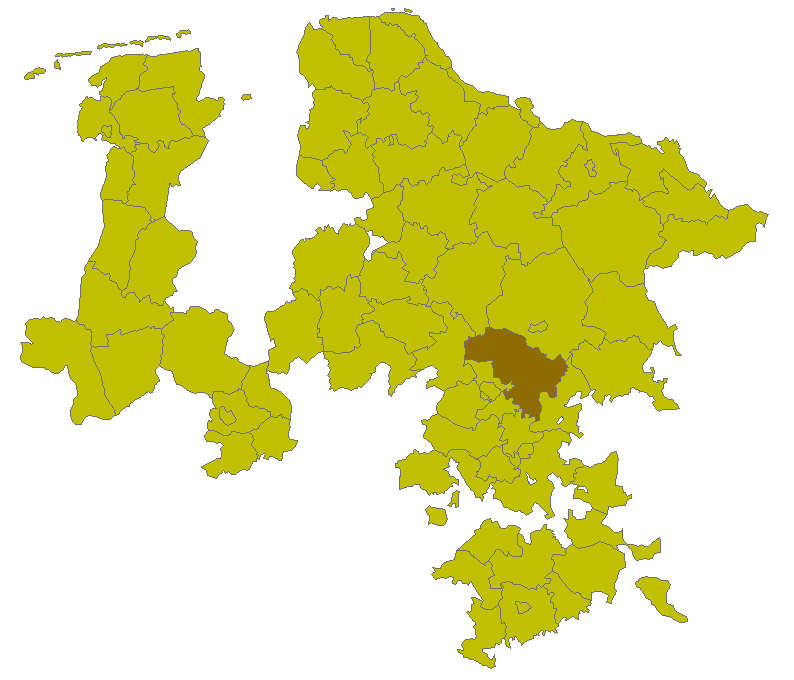
- Country: Germany
- State: Lower Saxony
- Disbanded: 1974
- Capital: Burgdorf

Area
  - Total: 825.05 km^{2} (318.55 sq mi)

Population (1973)
  - Total: 148,100
  - Density: 179.5/km^{2} (464.9/sq mi)
- Time zone: UTC+01:00 (CET)
  - Summer (DST): UTC+02:00 (CEST)
- Vehicle registration: BU

The Burgdorf District is a former district (Landkreis) in Germany. It existed from 1885 to 1974, when it was absorbed in the Hanover District and subsequently in the Hanover Region. Its area corresponds roughly to the present day municipalities of Wedemark, Isernhagen, Burgwedel, Burgdorf, Uetze, Lehrte and Sehnde.

== Geography ==
The district comprised the localities of the present day cities

- Burgdorf,
- Burgwedel,
- Lehrte (without Hämelerwald),
- Sehnde (without the villages Bolzum, Müllingen, Wassel, Wehmingen and Wirringen)

and the present-day municipalities

- Isernhagen,
- Uetze (without the villages Dedenhausen and Eltze),
- Wedemark

as well as Oelerse (today part of Edemissen), Harber (today part of Hohenhameln), Landwehr and Röhrse (today part of Peine) as well as Isernhagen-Süd (today part of Hannover).
