= Horst Schild =

German politician (1942–2024)

Horst Schild (4 April 1942 – 14 December 2024) was a German SPD politician. He was a member of the Bundestag, representing the Hannover-Land II constituency from 1994 to 2005. Schild died on 14 December 2024, at the age of 82.
