= Henning Otte =

German politician

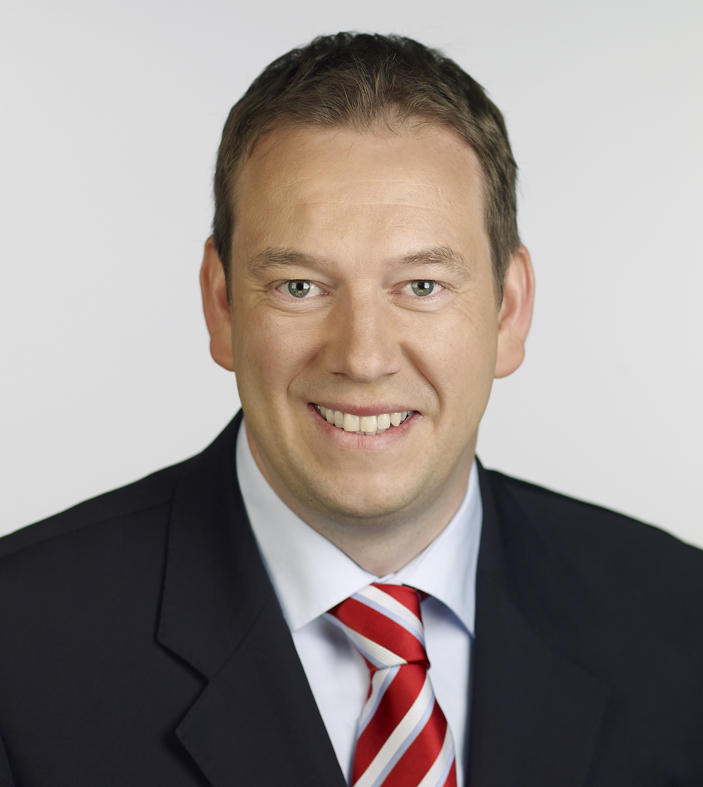
- Otte in 2009

Armed Forces Commissioner of the Bundestag
- Incumbent
- Assumed office 21 May 2025
- Nominated by: CDU
- President: Julia Klöckner
- Preceded by: Eva Högl

Member of the Bundestag; from Lower Saxony
- In office 18 October 2005 – 5 June 2025
- Preceded by: Multi-member district
- Succeeded by: Seat vacant
- Constituency: State list (2005–2009); Celle – Uelzen (2009–2025)

Personal details
- Born: Henning Rudolf Helmut Otte; 27 October 1968 (age 58) Celle, West Germany
- Party: Christian Democratic Union
- Children: 4
- Education: University of Hamburg

Henning Otte (born 27 October 1968) is a German politician and member of the Christian Democratic Union of Germany (CDU) who has been serving as Parliamentary Commissioner for the Armed Forces of Germany since 2025.

== Early life and career ==
Otte was born on 27 October 1968 in Celle, Lower Saxony. After taking his A levels (Abitur) in the Christian Gymnasium in Hermannsburg Otte did his military service as a short service volunteer with the Bundeswehr and also underwent training as a reserve officer. Subsequently, he passed his training as a banker with Sparkasse Celle before studying law at the University of Hamburg. Otte was last employed as a company lawyer (Prokurist) in a medium-sized steel construction firm.

== Political career ==
Otte joined the CDU in 1994 and has belonged since 1999 to the board of the CDU district association in Celle. Since 2006, he has been a member of the board of the European People's Party (EVP) and has been deputy chairman of the CDU District Association of Northeast Lower Saxony since 2007.

Since 1996, Otte has been a town councillor (Stadtrat) for Bergen, a parish councillor (Ortsrat) for Eversen and a member of the district council (Kreistag) for the district or county of Celle. He is currently the deputy head of the district authority (Landrat) for the district of Celle.

=== Member of Parliament (2005–2025) ===
In the 2005 elections, Otte first became a member of parliament in the German Bundestag, where he was on the state list for Lower Saxony. In 2009 he was given the direct mandate for the constituency of Celle – Uelzen with 44.2% of first votes, defeating Kirsten Lühmann of the Social Democratic Party who has since entered the Bundestag on the Lower Saxon state list.

In parliament, Otte was a member of the Defence Committee and deputy member of the Committee on Foreign Affairs. He also served as the CDU/CSU group's spokesperson on defence policy.

In addition to his committee assignments, Otte served as a member of the German delegation to the NATO Parliamentary Assembly from 2014 to 2025, where he was part of the Defence and Security Committee. Between 2009 and 2013, he was also part of the Parliamentary Friendship Group for Relations with the Baltic States as well as of the Parliamentary Friendship Group for Relations with the States of South America. From 2019, he was a member of the German delegation to the Franco-German Parliamentary Assembly.

In the negotiations to form a coalition government following the 2013 federal elections, Otte was part of the CDU/CSU delegation in the working group on foreign affairs, defense policy and development cooperation, led by Thomas de Maizière and Frank-Walter Steinmeier. In the coalition talks following the 2017 federal elections, he was again appointed to the working group on foreign policy, defense and development, this time led by Ursula von der Leyen, Gerd Müller and Sigmar Gabriel.

In his capacity as member of the Defence Committee, Otte traveled extensively to visit Bundeswehr troops on their missions abroad, including in Kabul (2012), Mazar-i-Sharif (2012, 2013) and Gao (2016) and at the Incirlik Air Base (2016). In 2015, he accompanied German Minister of Defence Ursula von der Leyen to meetings with King Abdullah II of Jordan and President Beji Caid Essebsi of Tunisia, among others.

== Other activities ==
- German Association for Defence Technology (DWT), Deputy Chairman
- Association of the German Army (FKH), Member of the Presidium
- Soldiers and Veterans Foundation (SVS), Member of the Board of Trustees
- Saint Barbara Foundation for Land Mine Victims, Member of the Board of Trustees
- Celle General Hospital (AKH), Deputy Member of the Supervisory Board

== Personal life ==
Otte is protestant, married and a father of four.
