= Harber =

Harber is a surname. Notable people with the surname include:

- Aaron Harber, American talk show host
- Anton Harber, South African journalist
- Denzil Dean Harber (1909–1966), British Trotsykist and ornithologist
- Giles B. Harber (1849–1925), United States Navy admiral
- Jane Harber, Australian actress
- John Harber (1889–1962), English cricketer

== See also ==
- Harber (DJ) (born 1997), American musician
