= Thomas Ehrhorn =

German politician (born 1959)

Member of the Bundestag
- Incumbent
- Assumed office 24 October 2017

Personal details
- Born: 20 March 1959 (age 67)
- Party: AfD

Thomas Ehrhorn (born 20 March 1959) is a German politician for the Alternative for Germany (AfD) and since 2017 a member of the Bundestag, the federal legislative body.

== Life and career ==
Ehrhorn was born in 1959 in the west German town of Helmstedt and became an aircraft pilot.

Ehrhorn entered the newly founded populist AfD in 2013 and became vice chairman of his party in the federal state of Lower Saxony.

After the 2017 German federal election he became a member of the Bundestag.
