= Anja Schulz =

German politician (born 1985)

Member of the Bundestag
- In office 2021–2025

Personal details
- Born: 28 October 1985 (age 40) Uelzen
- Party: Free Democratic Party

Anja Schulz (born 28 October 1985) is a German politician of the Free Democratic Party (FDP) who served as a member of the Bundestag from 2021 to 2025.

== Biography ==
Schulz was born in the West German town of Uelzen and became a bank accountant.

Schulz became member of the Bundestag in 2021.
