= Uetze =

- Municipality
- Coat of arms

- Location of Uetze within Hanover district
- Interactive map of Uetze
- Location within Germany Location within Lower Saxony
- Coordinates: 52°27′58″N 10°12′14″E
- Country: Germany
- State: Lower Saxony
- District: Hanover

Government
  - Mayor (2021–26): Florian Gahre (SPD)

Area
  - Total: 140.85 km^{2} (54.38 sq mi)
- Elevation: 51 m (167 ft)

Population (2025-12-31)
  - Total: 20,107
  - Density: 142.75/km^{2} (369.73/sq mi)
- Time zone: UTC+01:00 (CET)
  - Summer (DST): UTC+02:00 (CEST)
- Postal codes: 31311
- Dialling codes: 05147, 05173 (Uetze), 05177, 05175
- Vehicle registration: H
- Website: www.uetze.de

Uetze (German pronunciation: [ˈʏtsə]) is a municipality in the district of Hanover, in Lower Saxony, Germany. It is situated on the river Fuhse, approximately 35 km (22 mi) east of Hanover.

== Geography ==
Uetze is the easternmost municipality in the Hanover Region. It is bordered by the districts of Celle, Gifhorn and Peine as well as the towns Lehrte and Burgdorf, which are both part of the Hanover Region. Uetze consists of nine villages which used to be autonomous municipalities. Those villages are Altmerdingsen (including Krausenburg and Krätze), Dedenhausen, Dollbergen, Eltze, Hänigsen, Katensen, Obershagen, Schwüblingsen and the market town and municipality seat Uetze. Uetze is the largest settlement at about 7200 inhabitants, followed by Hänigsen at about 6000.

== History ==
Uetze was first mentioned in 1022 as "Utisson". The name is derived from the ruling house "von Uttensen". From 1552 to 1885, Uetze was protectorate of a Vogt in the department of Meinersen. Uetze was designated a market town in 1695. In the afternoon of 21 April 1863, almost all of Uetze proper was destroyed in a fire. The volunteer fire department was founded on 5 June 1880. In 1885, Uetze became part of the Burgdorf District, the Hanover District in 1974 and Hanover Region in 2001. Uetze used to be part of the Eastphalian Low German language area, but Standard German has all but replaced the language. There is still an active community of Low German speakers in Eltze. A dictionary for the village's dialect is available in Standard German.

== Transport ==
Highway B 188 traverses the area from east to west, connecting Uetze proper and Altmerdingsen to Burgdorf and Gifhorn. The highways B 214 and B 444 connect to Celle, Braunschweig and Peine. The villages Dollbergen and Dedenhausen both have a train station on the Berlin-Lehrte Railway which are served by regional express line RE 30 from Hanover to Wolfsburg. The municipality is connected to Burgdorf and Lehrte via RegioBus lines 910, 920, 930 and 946. Lines 938 and 950 operate within the municipal limits.
