= Steffen Krach =

German politician (born 1979)

Steffen Krach MdA
- Krach in 2026

President of the Hanover Region
- Incumbent
- Assumed office 1 November 2021
- Preceded by: Hauke Jagau

State Secretary for Science of Berlin
- In office 13 December 2014 – 31 October 2021
- Governing Mayor: Michael Müller
- Preceded by: Knut Nevermann
- Succeeded by: Armaghan Naghipour

Leader of the Social Democratic Party in Berlin
- Incumbent
- Assumed office 8 May 2026 Serving with Bettina König
- Deputy: Cansel Kiziltepe; Mathias Schulz; Sinem Taşan-Funke; Rona Tietje
- Preceded by: Martin Hikel; Nicola Böcker-Giannini

Leader of the SPD in the Abgeordnetenhaus of Berlin
- Incumbent
- Assumed office 30 September 2026 Serving with Derya Caglar
- Preceded by: Raed Saleh

Member of the Abgeordnetenhaus of Berlin
- Incumbent
- Assumed office 21 September 2026
- Constituency: Social Democratic Party List

Personal details
- Born: 7 August 1979 (age 47) Hanover, West Germany
- Party: SPD (since 1998)
- Children: 3
- Education: University of Göttingen; Otto Suhr Institute for Political Science

Steffen Krach (born 7 August 1979) is a German politician serving as co-chair of the Social Democratic Party (SPD) in Berlin since May 2026 as well as concurrently serving as president of the Hanover Region since 2021. Most prominently, he is known for serving as the Berlin SPD’s lead candidate in the 2026 Berlin state election, in which the party suffered its worst ever result, due to scandal and perceivable unpopularity with the party’s tenure as the junior coalition partner in the Wegner senate’s government of Berlin. From 2014 to 2021, he served as state secretary of science of Berlin.
