= Dudensen =

- Ortsteil of Neustadt am Rübenberge
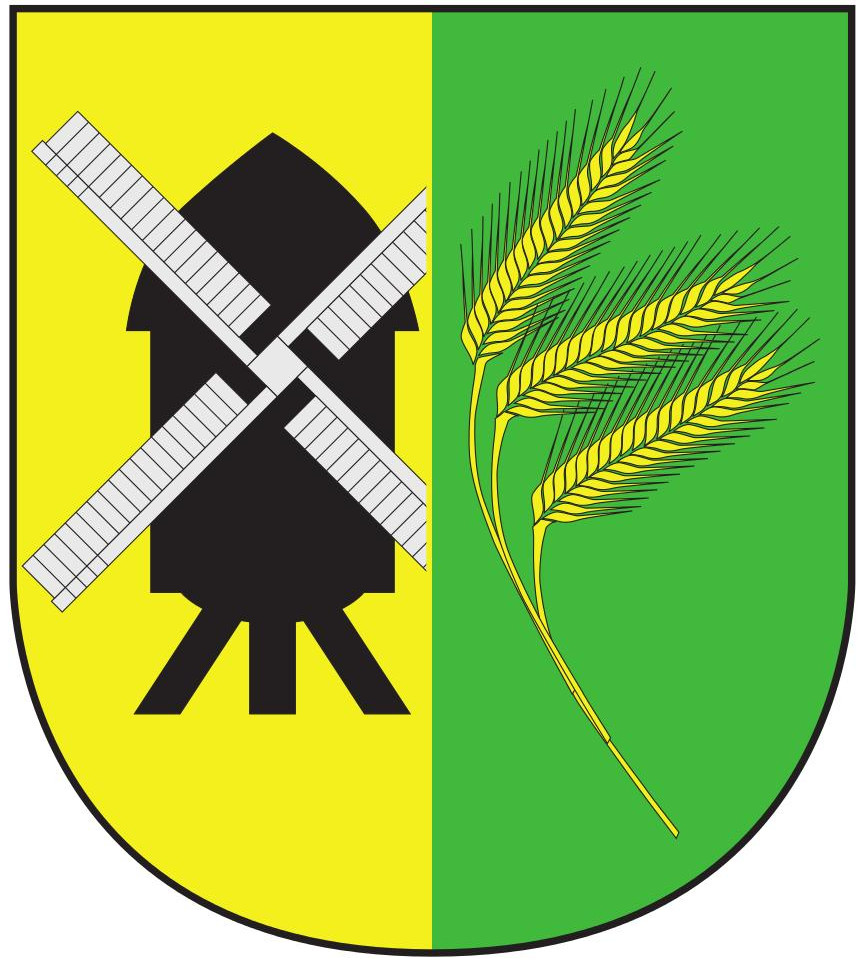
- Coat of arms
- Interactive map of Dudensen
- Location within Germany Location within Lower Saxony
- Coordinates: 52°35′56″N 9°26′36″E
- Country: Germany
- State: Lower Saxony
- District: Hanover
- Town: Neustadt am Rübenberge

Area
  - Total: 9.72 km^{2} (3.75 sq mi)
- Elevation: 36 m (118 ft)

Population (2021)
  - Total: 530
  - Density: 55/km^{2} (140/sq mi)
- Time zone: UTC+01:00 (CET)
  - Summer (DST): UTC+02:00 (CEST)
- Postal codes: 31535
- Dialling codes: 05034

Dudensen is a village of Neustadt am Rübenberge in the district of Hanover, Lower Saxony in Germany. It had a population of 530 in 2021.

== Toponymy ==
The abandoned villages Holinbeke and Sesenhusen are in the Dudensen district. Both are each named in a deed of donation, the former from 1033, the second 1186. Both deserts can be found with Seenser Feld and Hollenheide still in today's names.

In her work on names of places in Neustadt am Rübenberge, Tanja Weiß uses two different names. Already in 1128 there is a documentary recorded Duotdenhusen. In a document from 1228 finally appears the name Dudenhusen. There are also two other secondary sources that indicate the year 1228 as the date of the first documentary mention of the place Dudensen under the name Dudenhusen. However, two other sources indicate the year 1261 for the first written mention. In contrast, however, the entry in the Hoyer Lehnsregister around the year 1250 states that Count Heinrich von Hoya in Dudenhusen owned two Hufe. Still in the year 1859 the place is officially listed as Duensen, as it still occurs in the linguistic usage.

== Governance ==
Due to the territorial reform in 1974 Dudensen was a district of Neustadt am Rübenberge. and since then forms with Borstel, Hagen and Nöpke a village that is represented by a local council. The name of the borough has been Mühlenfelder Land since November 2011. The local council is made up of a councilwoman and ten councilors. The local council also has 17 advisory members.

== Geography ==
Dudensen is about 12 kilometres (7.5 mi) north of Neustadt's main part of the city. West of Dudensen in the western part of Dudenser bog is located the source of the creek called Alpe.

The place belongs together with Nöpke, Borstel and Hagen to Mühlenfelder Land.

== Religion ==
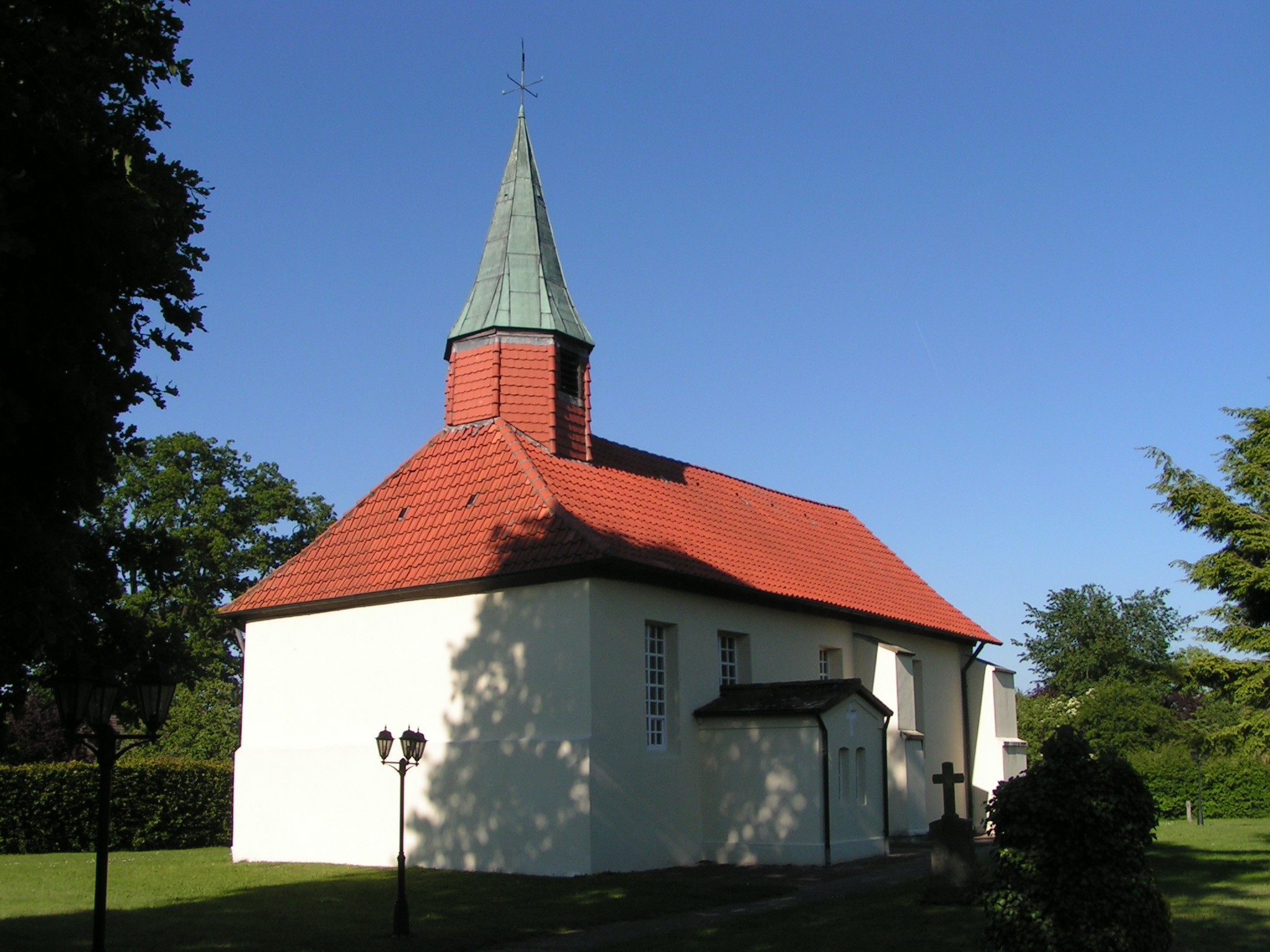
St.-Ursula-Church

In a decree of May 17, 1811, the district In den Meyerhöfen, which until then belonged to the parish Mandelsloh, was incorporated into Dudensen. In 1824 Dudensen is listed as a parish village, that means in the village a pastor had his seat. In 1871, 476 of the inhabitants, 475 were Protestant and one Catholic.
