= Kloster Mariensee =

Convent in Mariensee, Lower Saxony, Germany

Mariensee convent
- Kloster Mariensee
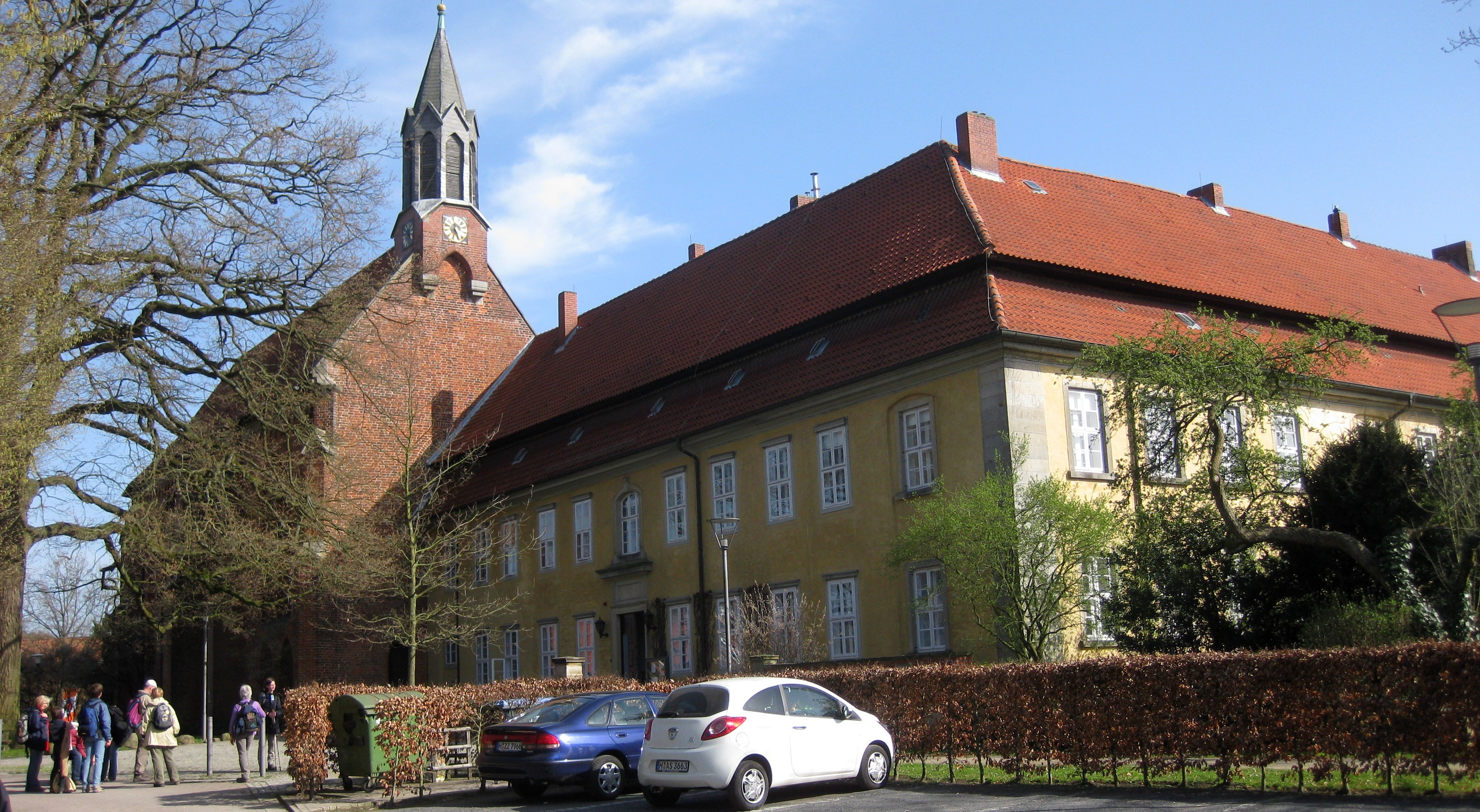
- Interactive map of Mariensee convent

Monastery information
- Denomination: Catholic (until 1543); Protestant (from 1543)
- Established: c. 1213–14

Site
- Location: Mariensee, Neustadt am Rübenberge, Hanover
- Country: Germany
- Coordinates: 52.5586°N 9.4867°E
- Website: www.kloster-mariensee.de

The Mariensee convent (Kloster Mariensee) is an Evangelical Lutheran women's convent in Mariensee, a district of Neustadt am Rübenberge northwest of Hanover. It is one of five Calenberg Convents, which are administered by the Hanover Monastic Chamber.

== History ==
The Mariensee convent was founded around 1213–14 as a Cistercian women's monastery by Bernard II, Count of Wölpe, and endowed with a vast landownership.

== Furnishings ==
The Judgment Day (Das Jüngste Gericht) tapestry.

== General references ==
- Matthäus Merian; Martin Zeiler (1654). Topographia und Eigentliche Beschreibung Der Vornembsten Stäte, Schlösser auch anderer Plätze und Örter in denen Hertzogthümer Braunschweig und Lüneburg und denen dazu gehörende Grafschafften Herzschafften und Landen (in German). Frankfurt am Main: Matthäus Merian the Elder. p. 152. OCLC 84587628. OL 26498788M. Wikidata Q19230666.
- Ernst Andreas Friedrich: Wenn Steine reden könnten. Band IV. Landbuch-Verlag, Hannover 1998, ISBN 3-7842-0558-5
- Bärbel Görcke: Kloster Mariensee. In: Evangelische Klöster in Niedersachsen. Rostock 2008, ISBN 978-3-356-01249-1
- Wilhelm von Hodenberg (Hrsg.): Archiv des Klosters Mariensee (= Calenberger Urkundenbuch; 5. Abtheilung). Jänecke, Hannover 1858 (uni-goettingen.de)
