= Hauke Jagau =

German politician

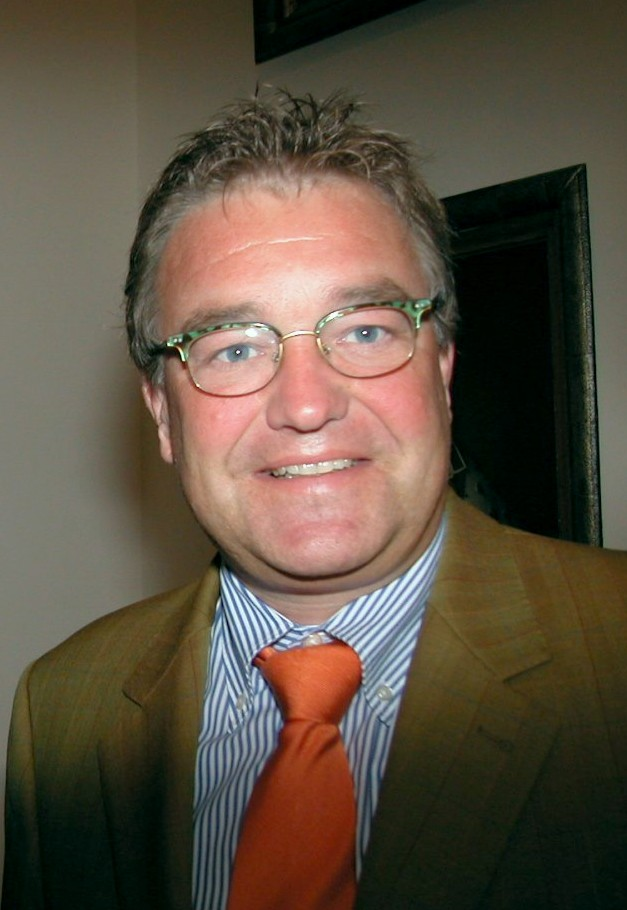
- Hauke Jagau
- Born: 1961; Hannover, West Germany
- Occupation: German politician
- Website: http://www.hauke-jagau.de

Hauke Jagau (born 1961 in Hanover, West Germany) is a German politician (SPD).

== Career ==
Before being mayor of Laatzen the lawyer worked for SPD-Landtagsfraktion Niedersachsen, the State Ministry of Justice and the State Chancellery in the government of Minister-President Gerhard Schröder.

Since 2006, Jagau has been serving as the president of the Region Hannover. In September 2020, he announced that he would not stand for re-election in 2021 but instead resign from active politics by the end of his term.

In addition, Jagau is the vice-chairman of the SPD in Lower Saxony under the leadership of Stephan Weil as well as member of the managing committee of SPD-Bezirk Hannover.

== Other activities ==
=== Corporate boards ===
- Sparkasse Hannover, Chairman of the Supervisory Board
- Commerzbank, Member of the Regional Advisory Board
- Norddeutsche Landesbank (NORD/LB), Member of the Advisory Board

=== Non-profits ===
- Robert Enke Foundation, Member of the Board of Trustees (since 2017)
- German Life Saving Association (DLRG), Member

Preceded by	Mayor of Laatzen; 1996-2006	Succeeded by Thomas Prinz (SPD)
Preceded by Michael Arndt (SPD)	Regionspräsident Hannover; 2006	Succeeded by Incumbent
