= Quevilly =

Quevilly may refer to:

- Le Grand-Quevilly, French commune in Normandy
- Le Petit-Quevilly, French commune in Normandy
- US Quevilly-Rouen Métropole, football club from Le Petit-Quevilly
