= Rethen (Leine) =

- Ortsteil of Laatzen
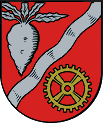
- Coat of arms
- Interactive map of Rethen
- Location within Germany Location within Lower Saxony
- Coordinates: 52°17′10″N 09°49′30″E
- Country: Germany
- State: Lower Saxony
- District: Hannover
- Town: Laatzen
- Elevation: 60–70 m (200–230 ft)

Population (2017)
  - Total: 9,231
- Time zone: UTC+01:00 (CET)
  - Summer (DST): UTC+02:00 (CEST)
- Postal codes: 30880
- Dialling codes: 05102
- Vehicle registration: H
- Website: www.laatzen.de

Rethen (Leine) is a part of the town of Laatzen in the district of Hanover, in Lower Saxony, Germany. It is situated south of both Hanover and the center of Laatzen.

== History ==
The name derives probably from the middle low German language and means "House of the Reed (Reed)" or "Reed home" ("Ret" = Reed; "Hen" = home). Rethen was first mentioned in 1250 as a district of Gleidingen. The first chapel of the bishopric of Hildesheim was built 1448. In 1523, Rethen coincided with the Koldingen Office to the Duchy of Calenberg. In 1592, a school was established in Rethen. The construction of the railway line Hanover-Kassel (operation 1853) brought a significant upswing, which intensified again from March 22, 1899, by the inclusion of the tram from Hanover to Hildesheim. The modern transportation promoted several industrial settlements, including the sugar factory in 1876, which had a long time national significance.

In 1974 Rethen lost its independency and was merged with the towns of Gleidingen, Grasdorf, Alt-Laatzen, Laatzen Mitte and Ingeln-Oesselse to the city of Laatzen.

== See also ==
- Metropolitan region Hannover-Braunschweig-Göttingen-Wolfsburg
- Laatzen
