= Gleidingen =

- Stadtteil of Laatzen
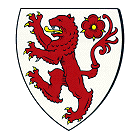
- Coat of arms
- Interactive map of Gleidingen
- Location within Germany Location within Lower Saxony
- Coordinates: 52°16′30″N 09°50′20″E
- Country: Germany
- State: Lower Saxony
- District: Hanover
- Town: Laatzen
- Elevation: 65–70 m (213–230 ft)

Population (2021)
  - Total: 4,360
- Time zone: UTC+01:00 (CET)
  - Summer (DST): UTC+02:00 (CEST)
- Postal codes: 30880
- Dialling codes: 05102
- Vehicle registration: H
- Website: www.laatzen.de

Gleidingen is a part of the town of Laatzen in the district of Hanover, in Lower Saxony, Germany. It is situated south of both Hanover and the center of Laatzen.

== History ==
Gleidingen is the oldest part of the town of Laatzen. Its existence is proved by documents since 983 when „Hrothger de Glethingi“ and others proved the borders between the bishoprics of Hildesheim and Minden.

In 1974 Gleidingen lost its independency and was merged with the towns of Rethen/Leine, Grasdorf, Alt-Laatzen, Laatzen Mitte and Ingeln-Oesselse to the city of Laatzen.

== Culture and sights ==
The origins of the St. Gertruden-Kirche (St Gertrud Church) in Gleidingen date back to the 12th century. The building on Hildesheimer Strasse was changed multiple times afterwards. The Baroque spire was added c1720, further alterations inside were made in 18th and 19th centuries, e. g. the opulent Baroque pulpit. The church is a listed building.

A memorial for Danish-Norwegian Vice-Admiral Peter Wessel, called Tordenskiold (lit. "Thundershield"), has been erected near the site of the duel in which he was killed by the Swedishman Jakob Axel Staël von Holstein in 1720.

An old Jewish cemetery still in use is to be found on the south-east edge of the village.

== See also ==
- Metropolitan region Hannover-Braunschweig-Göttingen-Wolfsburg
- Laatzen
