= County of Wölpe =

Coordinates: 52°39′44″N 9°15′11″E

The County of Wölpe (green area inside red circle) c. 1250

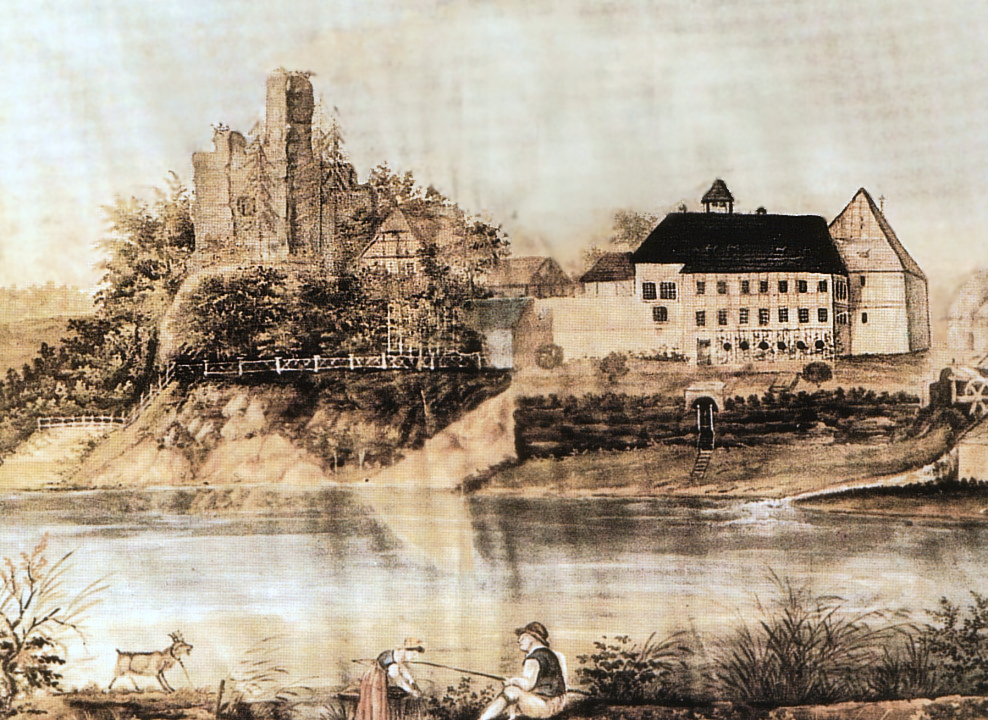
Painting of Schloss Wölpe in 1823. Left: its original site as a motte and bailey castle

The County of Wölpe (German: Grafschaft Wölpe) was the territorial lordship of a noble family in the Middle Ages in the Middle Weser Region near Nienburg/Weser which folded in 1302. The seat of the counts of Wölpe was the castle site at Erichshagen-Wölpe on the Wölpe stream in the borough of Nienburg in north Germany. The castle itself no longer exists.

== Important representatives ==
- Bernard II of Wölpe (1176–1221), founder of Neustadt am Rübenberge and Mariensee Abbey
- Iso of Wölpe (1167–1231), Prince-Bishop of Verden

== Sources ==
- Marcus René Duensing: Die Chronik der County of Wölpe, Diepenau 1999, ISBN 3-929793-69-5
- Ernst Andreas Friedrich: Wenn Steine reden könnten. Band IV, Landbuch-Verlag, Hannover 1998, ISBN 3-7842-0558-5
- Dieter Riemer: counts und Herren im Erzstift Bremen im Spiegel der Geschichte Lehes, Bremerhaven/Hamburg 1995 (Diss. phil. Oldenburg) S. 141 ff ISBN 3-923725-89-2
