= Alpe (Aller) =

River in Germany

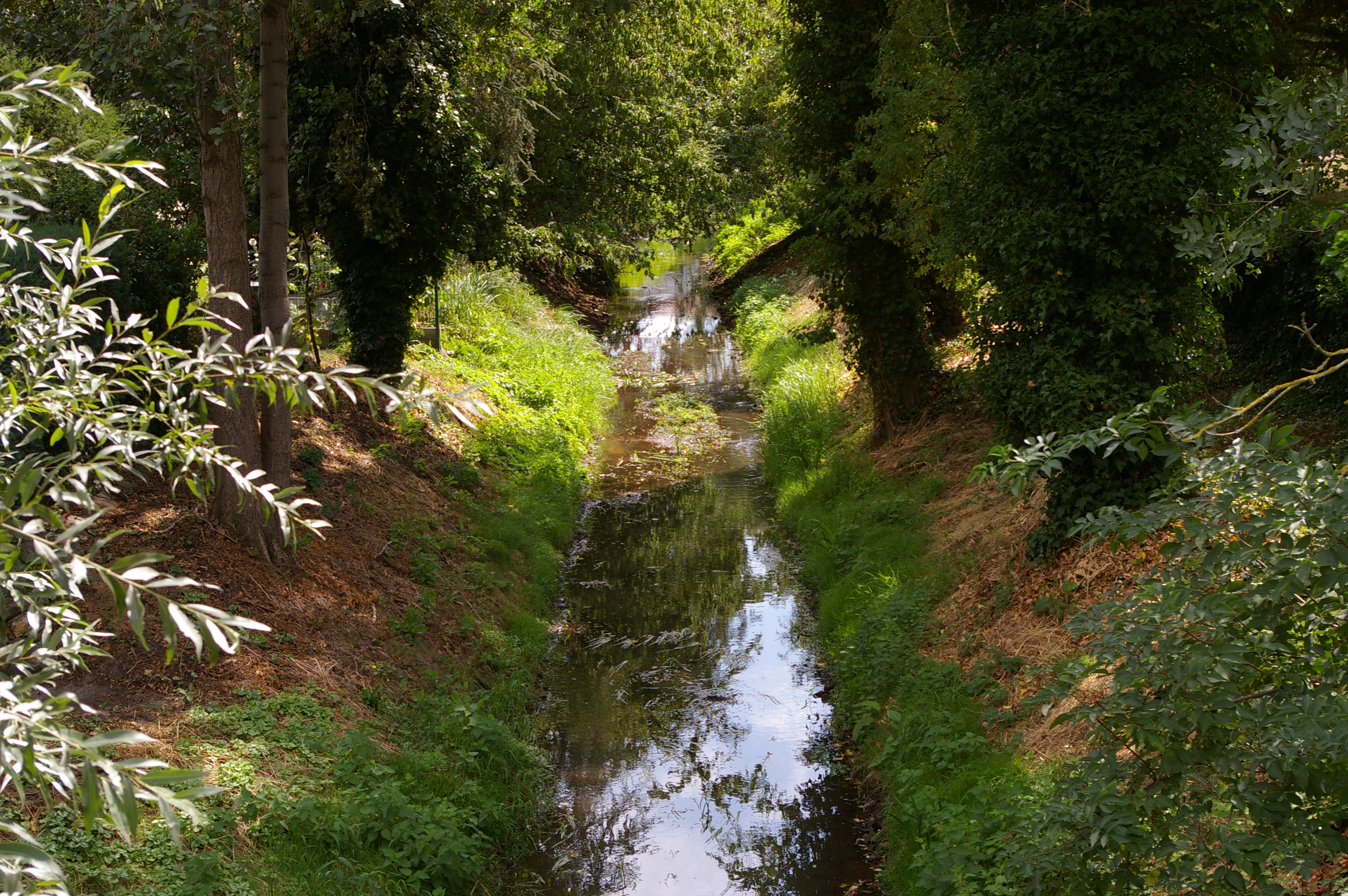

- Location of mouth in Lower Saxony

Location
- Country: Germany
- State: Lower Saxony

Physical characteristics
- Source
  - location: southwest of Dudensen
  - coordinates: 52°35′34″N 9°25′12″E
  - elevation: 46 m above sea level (NN)
- Mouth
  - location: in Rethem into the Aller
  - coordinates: 52°47′40″N 9°21′47″E
  - elevation: 18 m above sea level (NN)
- Length: 30.5 km (19.0 mi)
- Basin size: 252 km^{2} (97 sq mi)

Basin features
- Progression: Aller→ Weser→ North Sea
- Landmarks: Small towns: Rethem; Villages: Dudensen, Laderholz
- Tributaries
  - left: Laderholzer Moorgraben, Steimbker Dorfgraben, Moorbeeke, Alpengraben, Wölpe
  - right: Lutterer Bach, Neuer Eilter Graben, Schotengraben

The Alpe is a river of Lower Saxony, Germany.

The Alpe is a left tributary of the Aller. Its source lies between the villages of Dudensen and Nöpke, both within the town of Neustadt am Rübenberge. It initially crosses the Dudensen Bog and flows along the edge of the Bog Lichtenmoor and past Rethem Bog. In the 1970s it lost its natural character as it was straightened and, in places, canalised. The Steimbker Dorfgraben, a drainage ditch joining it from the left, is very heavily polluted (water quality class III–IV). The Alpe itself has a good overall water quality (class II = moderately polluted). Before the town of Rethem, the Weiße Graben ("White Ditch") joins the Alpe along with the Wölpe. In Rethem, the Alpe discharges into the Aller.

== See also ==
- List of rivers of Lower Saxony
