= Mandelsloh =

Borough of Neustadt am Rübenberge, Germany

Coordinates: 52.6006°N 9.5650°E

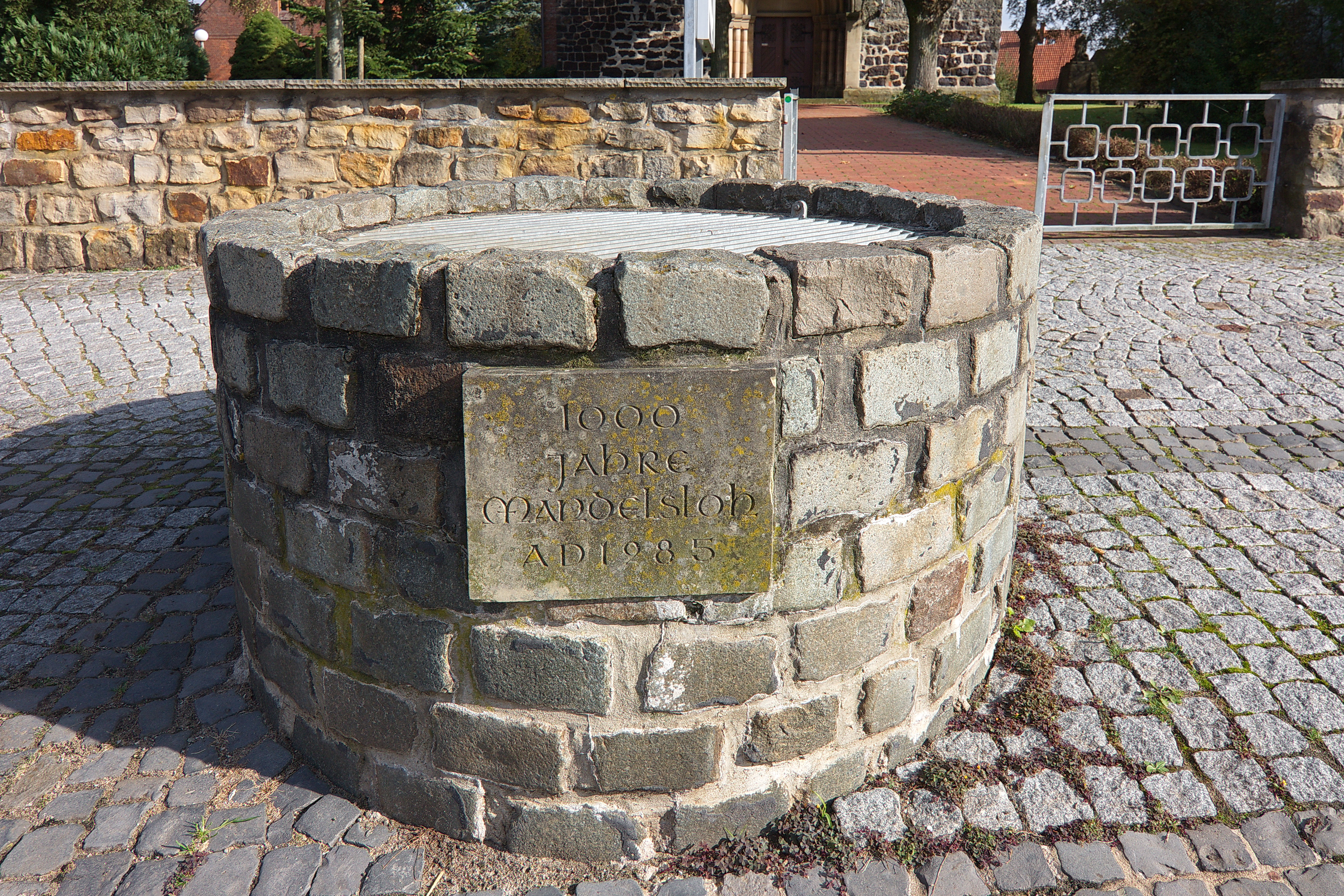
Plaque for 1000 years Mandelsloh

Mandelsloh is a borough of Neustadt am Rübenberge in the district of Hanover, in Lower Saxony, Germany. The village is close to the river Leine in a region known as the Hanoverian Moor Geest.

== Significant buildings ==
- The basilica St. Osdag was probably built by Henry the Lion around 1180. However, it was named after the Burgundian earl Osdag, who was killed in the Battle of Lüneburg Heath against Norsemen on 2 February 880 near Ebstorf, 1146 years ago. That year, or shortly after, his sister founded the church in his honour, and eventually laid him to rest within it, at the site the horses pulling the wagon with Osdag's remains she had recovered would go no further.
- After the fire of 1899 of the old Mandelsloh mill, a new Dutch windmill was erected in 1906, which was operated by wind power until 1954 and by electricity until 1964. In 1992 it was converted for domestic purposes.
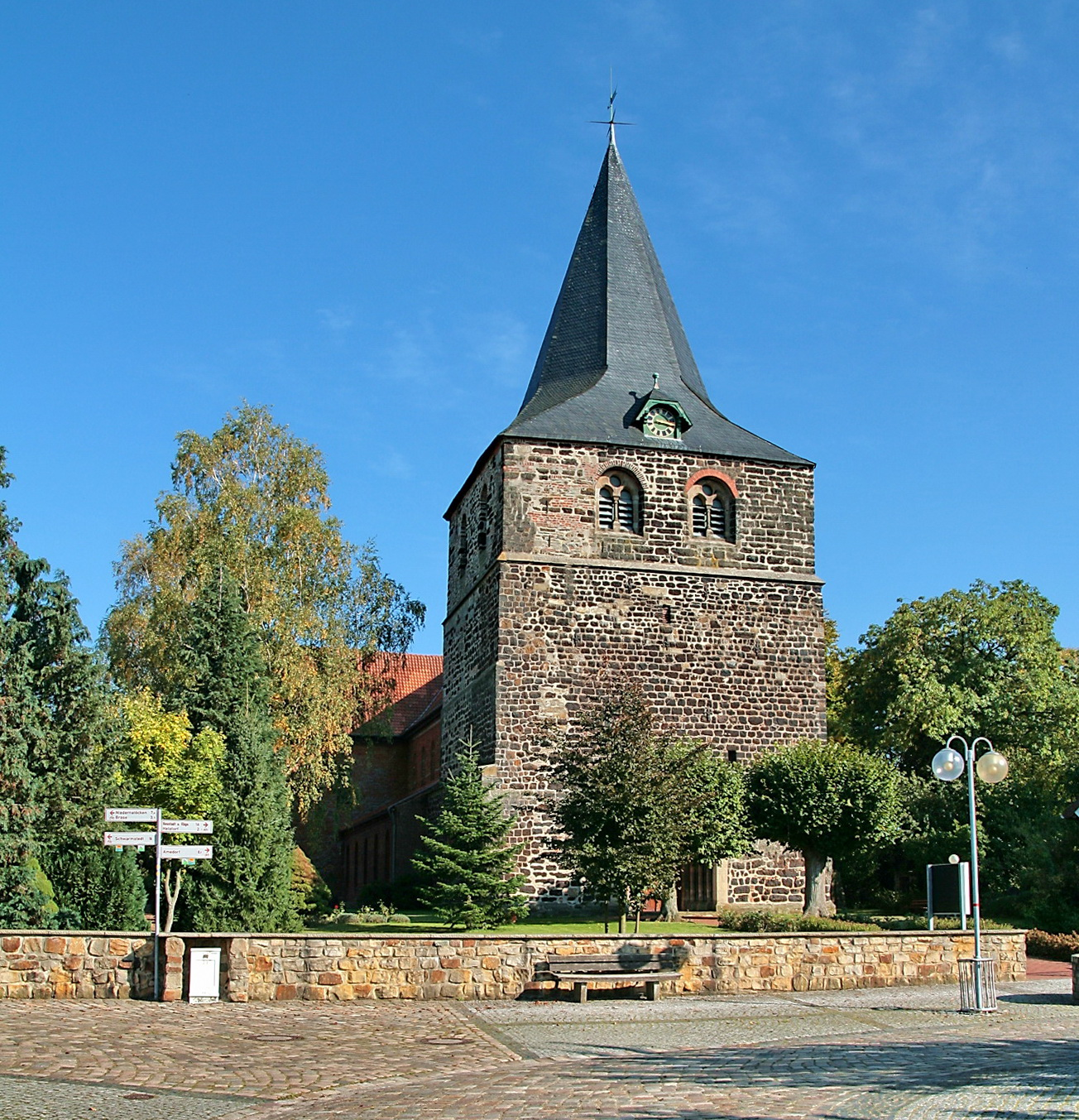
Basilika St. Osdag

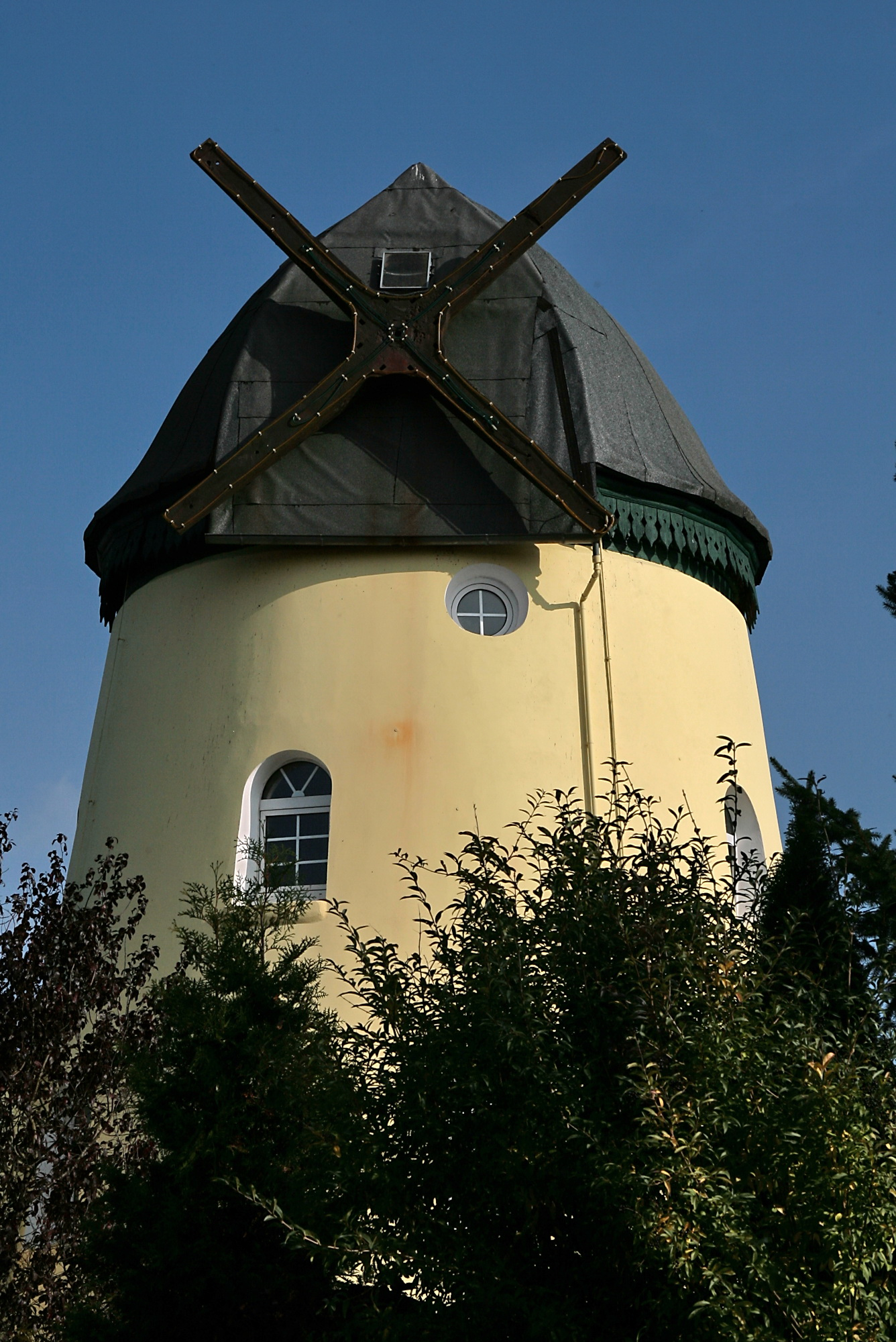
Dutch wind mill

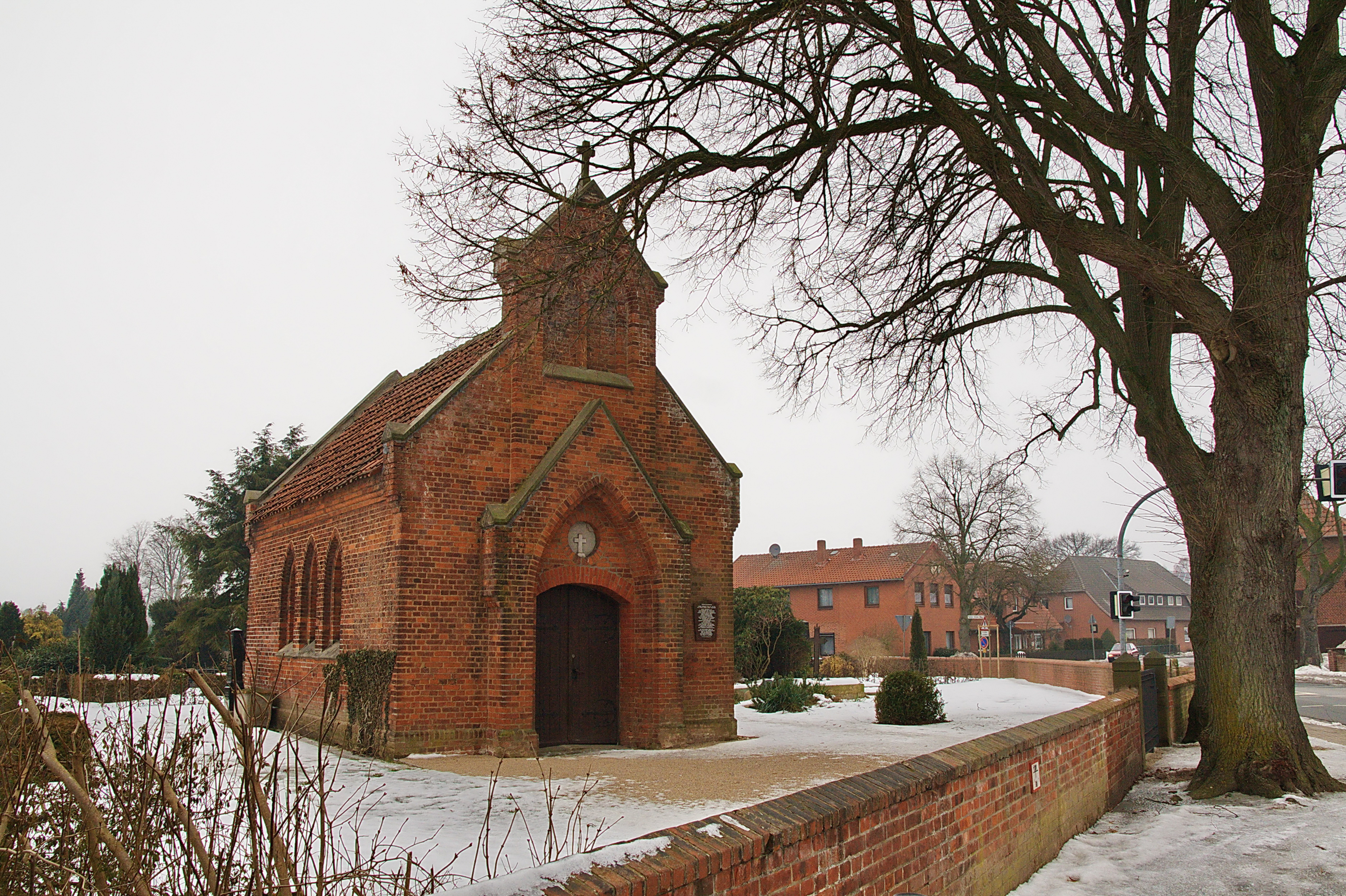
Chapel of the cemetery

== Sport ==
The Mandelsloh Knights are a well known Inline-Skaterhockey team who became German vice champions in 2002.
