= Mariensee (Neustadt am Rübenberge) =

Borough of Neustadt am Rübenberge, Germany

- Ortsteil of Neustadt am Rübenberge
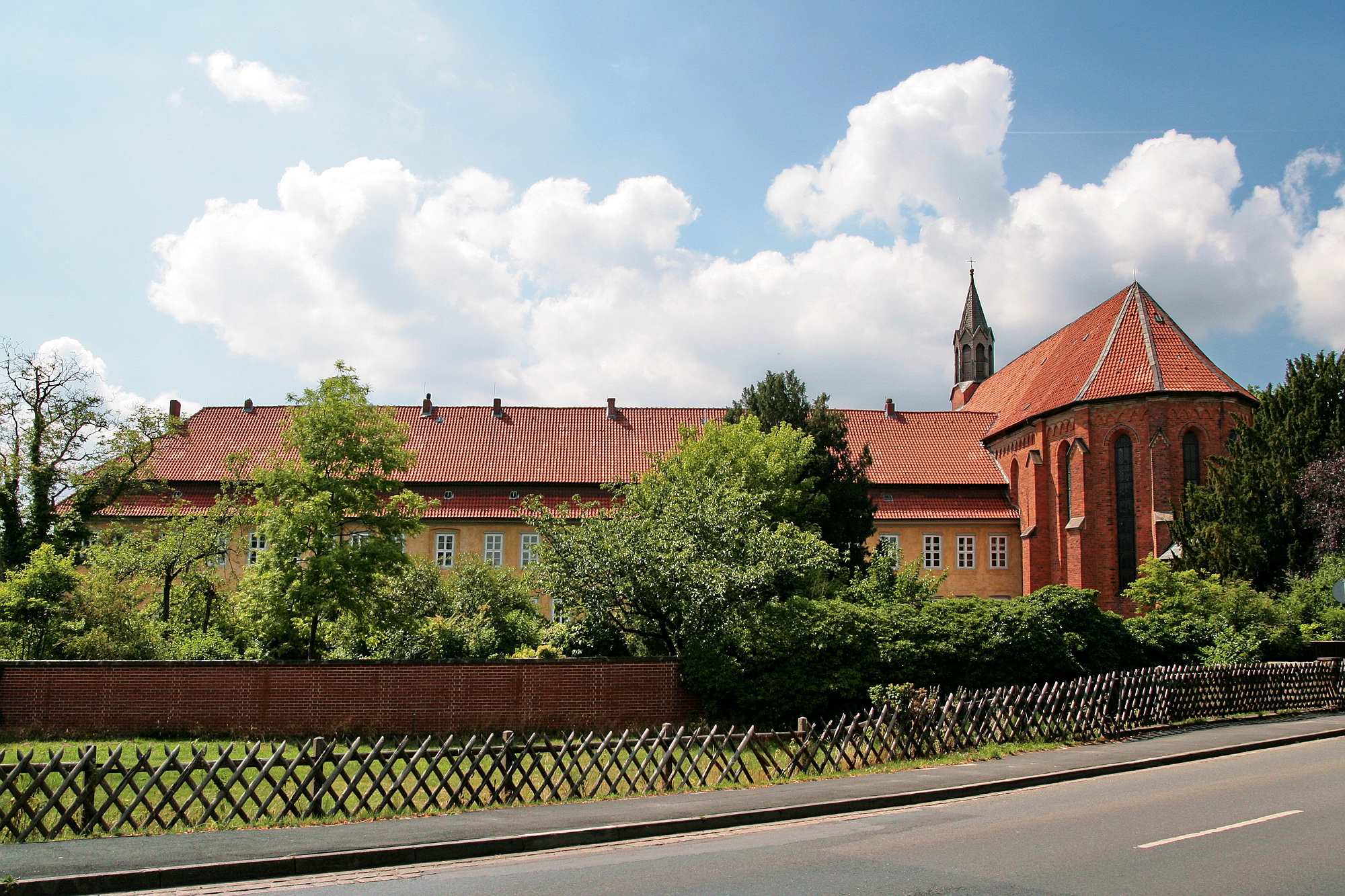
- Kloster Mariensee

- Coat of arms
- Interactive map of Mariensee
- Location within Germany Location within Lower Saxony
- Coordinates: 52°33′47″N 9°29′12″E
- Country: Germany
- State: Lower Saxony
- District: Hanover
- Town: Neustadt am Rübenberge

Area
  - Total: 9.52 km^{2} (3.68 sq mi)
- Elevation: 41 m (135 ft)

Population (2021)
  - Total: 1,095
  - Density: 115/km^{2} (298/sq mi)
- Time zone: UTC+01:00 (CET)
  - Summer (DST): UTC+02:00 (CEST)
- Postal codes: 31535
- Dialling codes: 05034

Mariensee (German pronunciation: [maˈʁiːənˌzeː]) is a village in Lower Saxony, Germany, and a borough (Stadtteil, lit. 'city part') of Neustadt am Rübenberge. Its population was 1195 in April 2021.

Originally called Catenhusen, it became Mariensee (lit. 'Mary's lake') when, according to legend, a statue of the Virgin Mary washing up during a flood of the Leine was considered a divine sign. The first known written record of the new name dates to 1207, albeit in, as was customary at the time, Latin as lacus sancte Marie (lit. 'Saint Mary's lake'). Mariensee convent founded around 1213–14 still dominates Mariensee architecturally.
