= Melanie Brinkmann =

German virologist

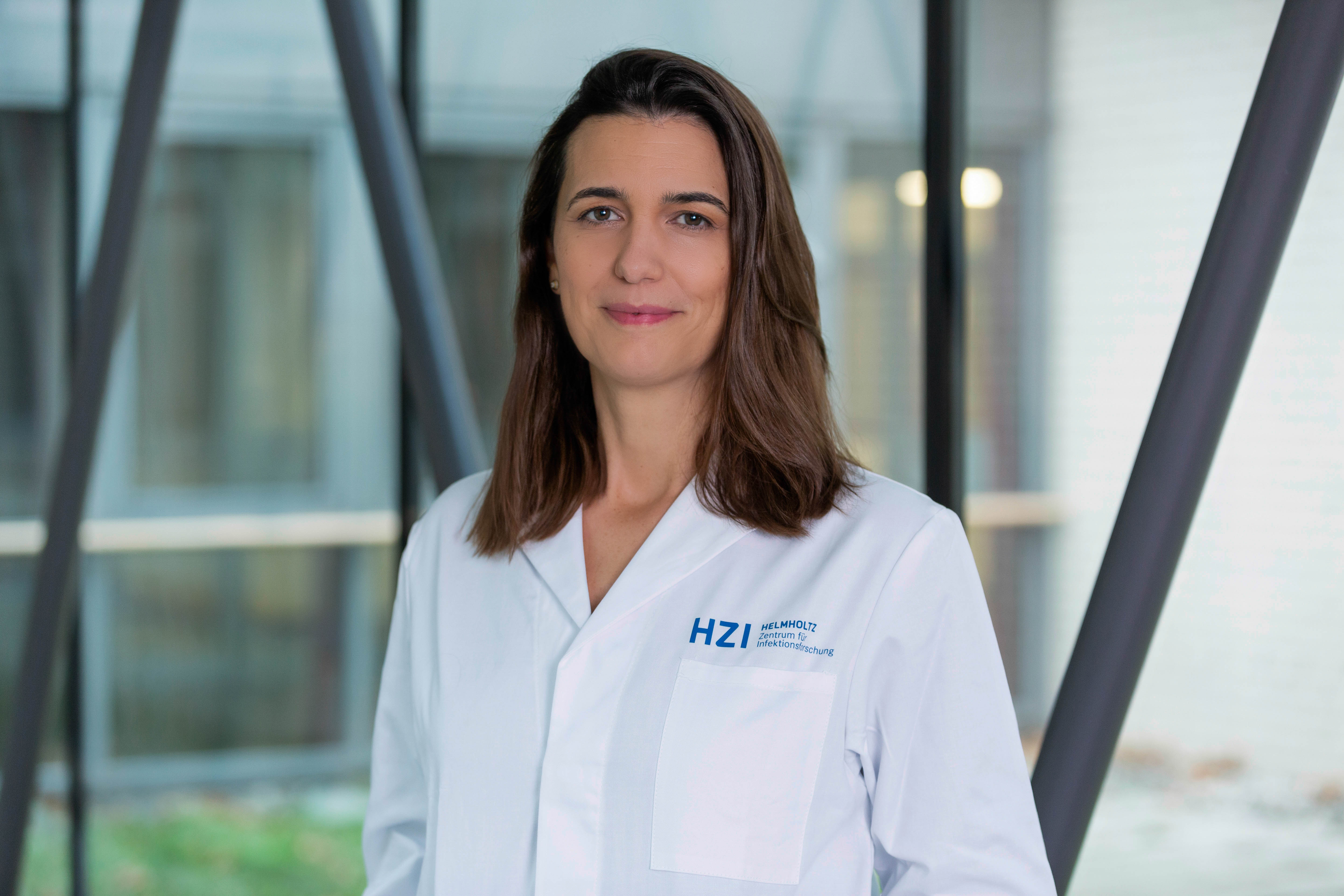
Melanie Brinkmann (2020)

Melanie Brinkmann is a German virologist. Until 2019 she was probably best known in connection with her work on the Cytomegalovirus. During 2020 she emerged as a much consulted expert-pundit for media commentators keen to discuss the COVID-19 pandemic. Brinkmann took a robust public position in the campaign against pandemic misinformation: she described the so-called "virus of false information" as "more deadly than the [COVID-19] virus itself".

== Early life and education ==
Melanie Margarete Brinkmann was born at Neustadt am Rübenberge, a town near Hanover, and attended school in nearby Garbsen. In 1993 she enrolled at the University of Hanover where for a year she studied Anglistics and Sociology. In 1994 she transferred to Göttingen, emerging two years later with a first degree in Biology. Following a formal 'very good' (sehr gut) commendation in recognition of her exam grades Brinkmann moved on again, this time to Berlin, still studying biology. However, it was from the University of Hanover that in 2004 she received her doctorate, for which she was supervised by Thomas F. Schulz. Her dissertation concerned the "Functional properties of proteins encoded by the K15 gene of the Kaposi's sarcoma-associated herpesvirus". As well as the doctorate, this work earned her a "summa cum laude" commendation and the doctorates prize awarded by the Hannover Medical School. In 2007 she received a postdoctoral research prize for Virology from the Berlin-based Robert Koch Foundation.

== Career ==
Supported by a research grant from the Bonn-based DFG, between 2006 and 2010 Brinkmann worked as a postdoctoral researcher with Hidde Ploegh at the Whitehead Institute for Biomedical Research in Cambridge, Massachusetts. Her research focus was on Toll-like receptors (TLRs).

In July 2010 Brinkmann took on the leadership of the "Immunotherapy Successor Group" ("Nachwuchsgruppe: Virale Immunmodulation") at the Helmholtz Centre for Infection Research (HZI) in Braunschweig. She has since been involved in several virology and immunology research projects backed by the DFG. The work she undertook between 2005 and 2008 in Massachusetts on TLRs was one of these: the project had as its objective the investigation of Herpesvirales immune escape. Since 2010 she has been co-leader of the DFG project on Modulation of the Immune Response through the Gammaherpesvirinae-linked Kaposi's sarcoma, associated with the Herpesviridae and the Murines Herpesvirus 68 (BO3).

Since 2018 Brinkmann has held a Level W2 professorship in Virus Genetics at the Genetics Institute of the "Technical University of Braunschweig" (TUB), in which she oversees the "Infections and Active Elements" ("Infektionen und Wirkstoffe") research speciality.

=== Media profile ===
During the spread of the COVID-19 pandemic Brinkmann became a frequent media presence, principally in Germany. In May 2020 she was co-organiser and a co-signatory, with Christian Drosten of the Charité, of an open letter from 100 doctors, nurses and health experts calling for stronger action to be taken by providers of media platforms/services against pandemic misinformation. Billed, by this time, as "Germany's best known virologist", she shared these concerns in a television interview on 7 May 2020, insisting on the importance to virologists that infected people should not use false information as the basis for decisions that could imperil their lives or the lives of others: "We must ensure that information that has not yet been adequately evaluated by experts does not become widely disseminated".

== Other activities ==
- Heinrich Pette Institute, Member of the Scientific Advisory Board

== Recognition ==
In 2016 Brinkmann received the Science Award - donated by Biomol GmbH of Hamburg - from the Hanover-based Signal transduction Society.
