= Bettina König =

German politician (born 1978)

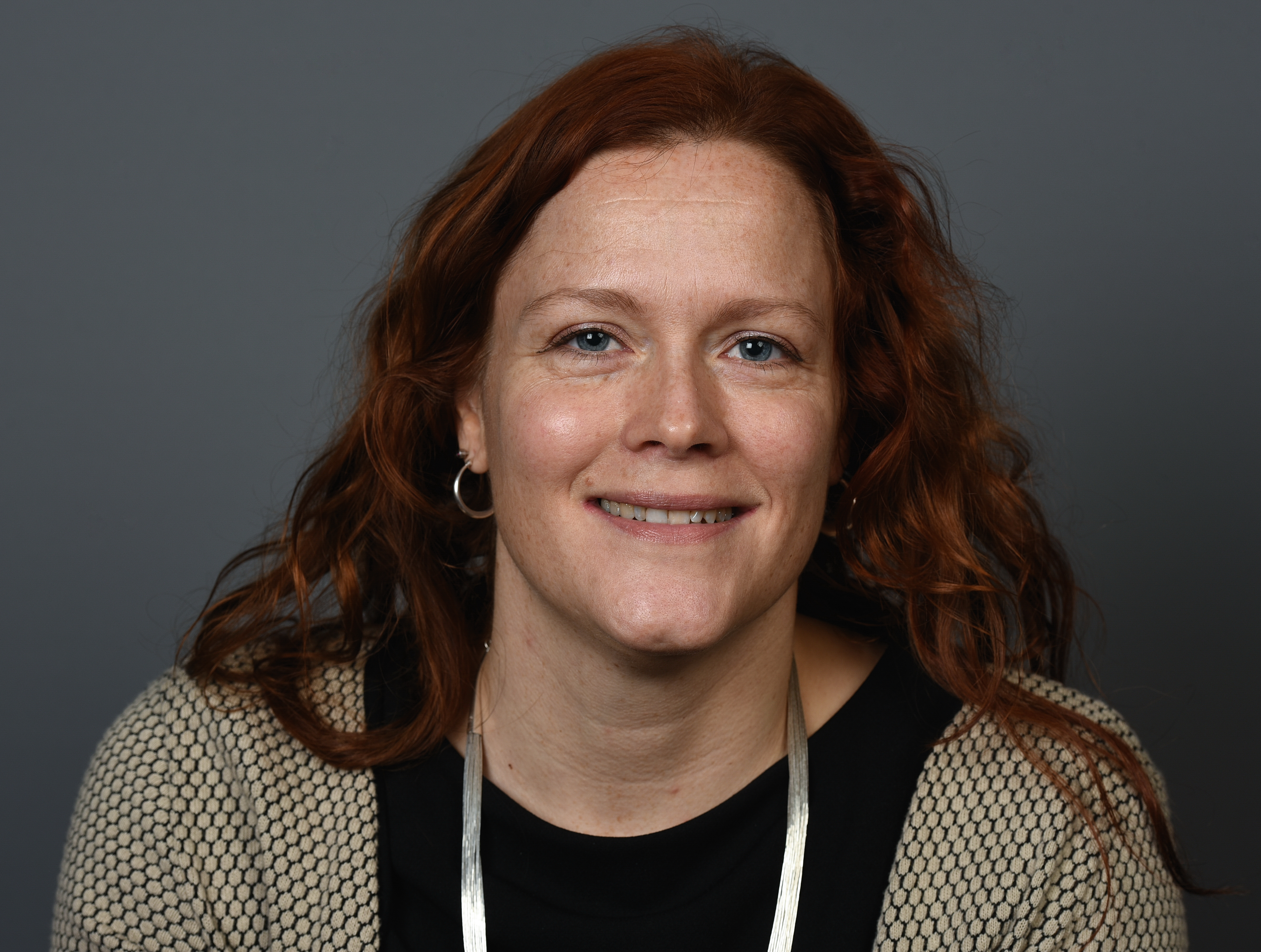
- König in 2017

Leader of the Social Democratic Party in Berlin
- Incumbent
- Assumed office May 2026 Serving with Steffen Krach
- Preceded by: Nicola Böcker-Giannini

Member of the Abgeordnetenhaus of Berlin
- Incumbent
- Assumed office 27 October 2016

Personal details
- Born: 24 November 1978 (age 47)
- Party: Social Democratic Party (since 2007)

Bettina König (born 24 November 1978) is a German politician a German politician who serves as co-chair of the Social Democratic Party in Berlin since May 2026 alongside her fellow co-chair Steffen Krach, who is also the party’s lead candidate in the 2026 Berlin state election. She has been a member of the Abgeordnetenhaus of Berlin since 2016.
