= Nicola Böcker-Giannini =

German politician (born 1975)

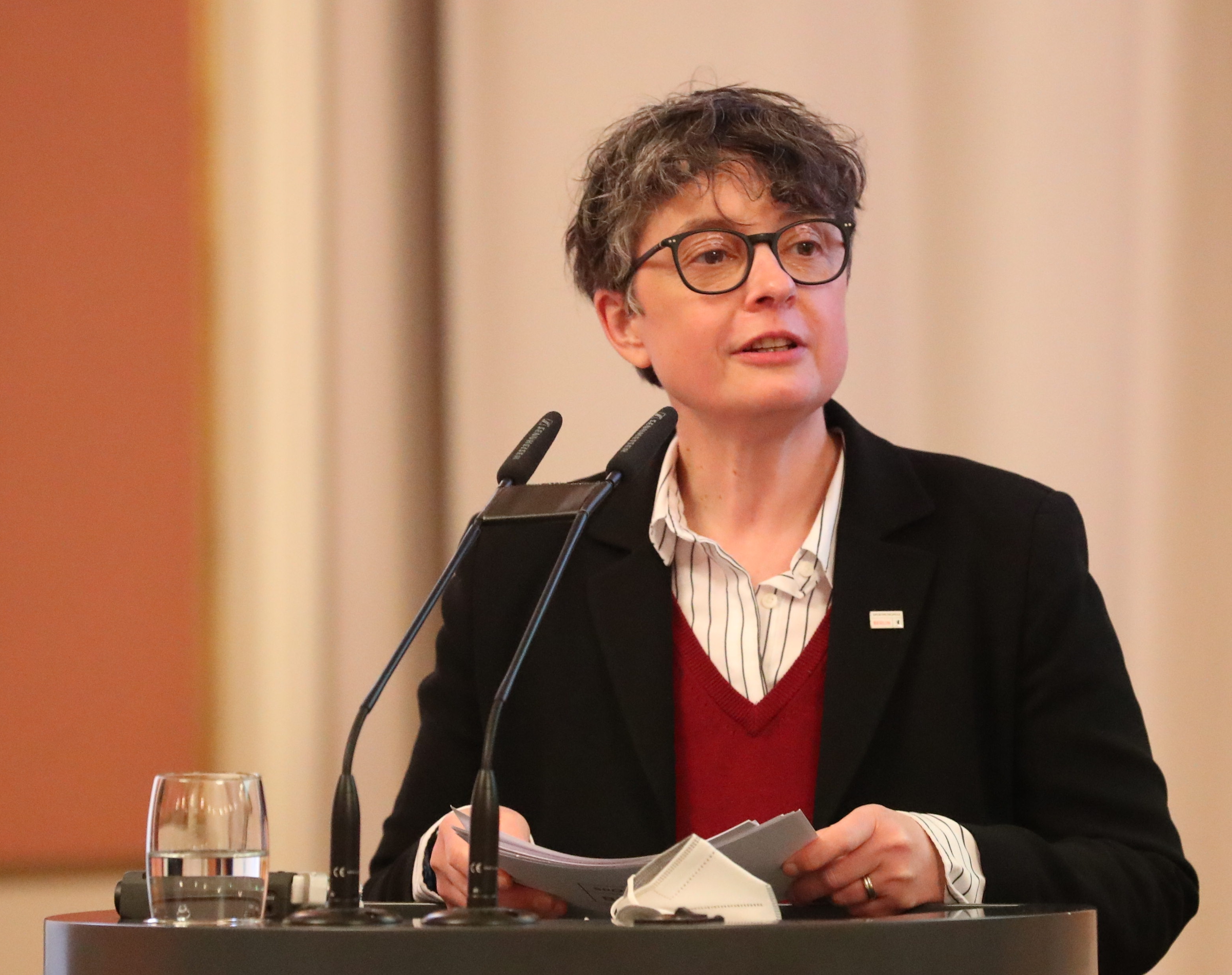
- Böcker-Giannini in 2022

Leader of the Social Democratic Party in Berlin
- In office May 2024 – May 2026 Serving with Martin Hikel
- Preceded by: Franziska Giffey; Raed Saleh
- Succeeded by: Bettina König; Steffen Krach

Member of the Abgeordnetenhaus of Berlin
- In office 6 March 2018 – 4 November 2021
- Preceded by: Karin Korte

Personal details
- Born: 1975 (age 50–51) Ratingen
- Party: Social Democratic Party (since 1998)

Nicola Böcker-Giannini (born 1975 in Ratingen) is a German politician who served as co-chair of the Social Democratic Party in Berlin from May 2024 to May 2026, during the party’s tenure as the junior partner in the Wegner senate’s government of Berlin. She and her co-chair Hikel announced their resignations in November 2025 due to irreconcilable differences with party officials in the district associations. One of her eventual co-replacements Steffen Krach went on to become the party’s lead candidate in the following 2026 Berlin state election. From 2018 to 2021, she was a member of the Abgeordnetenhaus of Berlin.
