= Hôtel de Ville, Le Grand-Quevilly =

Town hall in Le Grand-Quevilly, France

Hôtel de Ville
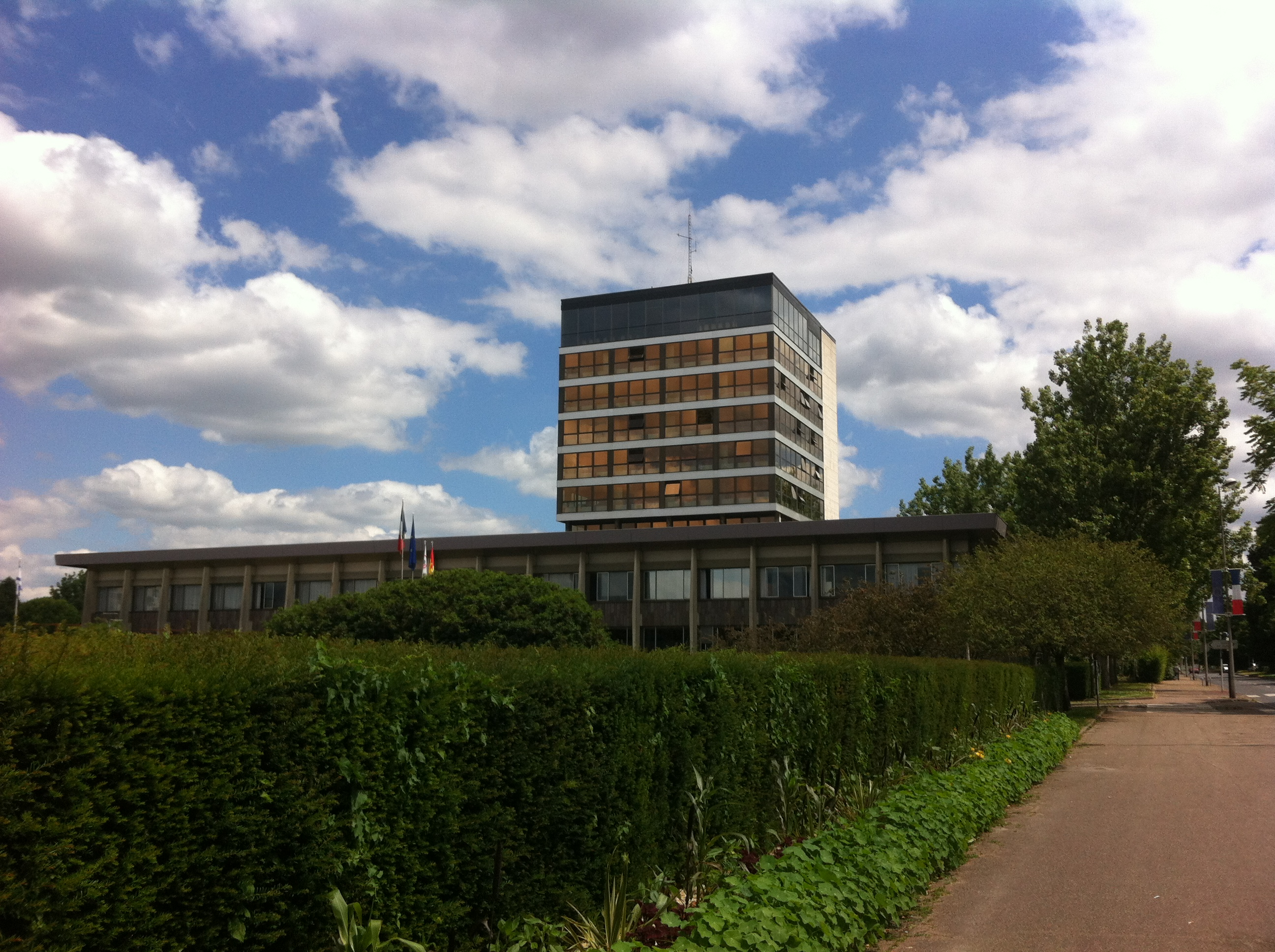
- The main frontage of the Hôtel de Ville in June 2014
- Interactive map of the Hôtel de Ville area

General information
- Type: City hall
- Architectural style: Modern style
- Location: Le Grand-Quevilly, France
- Coordinates: 49.4066°N 1.0525°E
- Completed: 1974

Design and construction
- Architect: Henri Tougard

The Hôtel de Ville (French pronunciation: [otɛl də vil], City Hall) is a municipal building in Le Grand-Quevilly, Seine-Maritime, in northern France, standing on Avenue Léon Blum.

== History ==
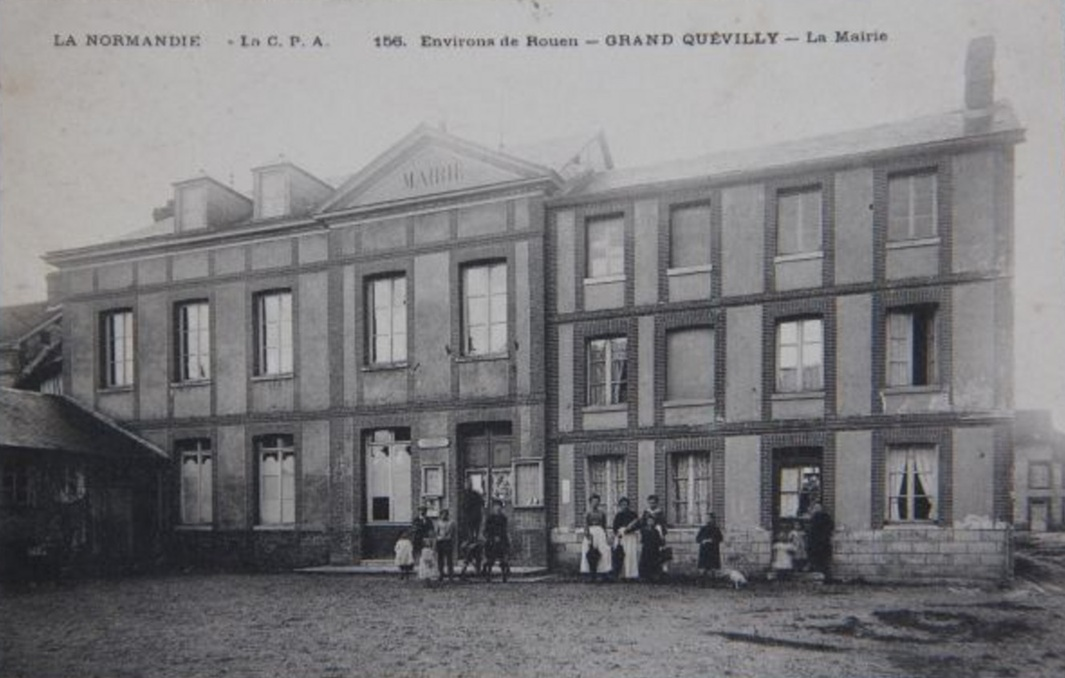
The first town hall

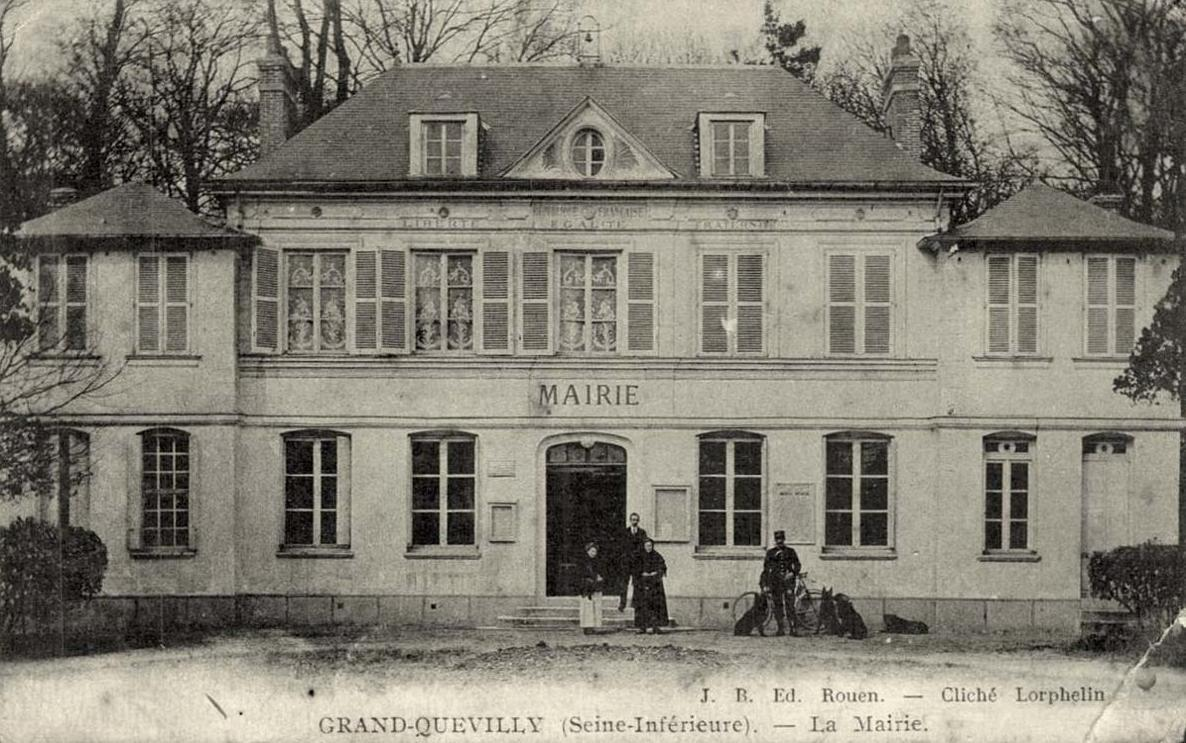
The second town hall

Following the French Revolution, the new town council initially met at the house of the mayor at the time. This arrangement continued until 1842 when the council established a "Maison Commune" on the east side of the Church of Saint-Pierre, between Rue de la République and Rue Sadi Carnot. This building was quite basic and also accommodated the local boys' school. It was designed in the neoclassical style and built in ashlar stone. The design involved a main frontage of nine bays with a pediment across the two central bays.

In 1914, after the first town hall became dilapidated, the town council decided to acquire a more substantial property. The building it selected was a private house belonging to the Lavoisier family on what is now Place Gabriel-Péri. The building was also designed in the neoclassical style and built in ashlar stone. The design involved an asymmetrical main frontage of nine bays facing onto Place Gabriel-Péri with the last two bays at both ends projected forward as pavilions. The central bay featured a segmental headed window on the ground floor, a casement window on the first floor and a small pediment containing an oriel window at attic level. The other bays were fenestrated in a similar style.

In the mid-1930s, after the second town hall also became dilapidated, the council led by the mayor, Tony Larue, decided to demolish it and to commission a new town hall on the same site. The third town hall was designed by Émile Thomas in the Art Deco style, built in reinforced concrete and was officially opened by the future minister of interior, Marx Dormoy, on 14 November 1937.

The design of the third town hall involved an asymmetrical main frontage of eight bays facing onto Place Gabriel-Péri with the first five bays projected forward. The first bay on the left featured a tall clock tower with a narrow window extending most of its height. The second bay contained a doorway on the ground floor and a casement window, which was surmounted by a statue of Marianne by the sculptor, Pierre Fournier des Corats, on the first floor. The next three bays were fenestrated by round headed windows on the ground floor, by tall casement windows on the first floor and by square shaped windows on the second floor. These bays were flanked by columns which spanned the first and second floors. The right-hand section of three bays contained the foyer to the main hall. After the building was no longer required for municipal use, it was converted for use as a cultural centre. In 2002, the building was designated a structure which exhibited "Architecture contemporaine remarquable" (Remarkable Contemporary Architecture).

In the early 1970s, following significant population growth, the council decided to commission a modern town hall. The site they selected was on the north side of Avenue Léon Blum. The new building was designed by Henri Tougard in the modern style, built in concrete and glass and was completed in 1974. The design involved a seven-storey tower surmounted on a two storey podium. Internally, the principal rooms in the building included the Salle Panorama (Panorama Room) on the 9th floor.
