= Wölpe =

River in Germany

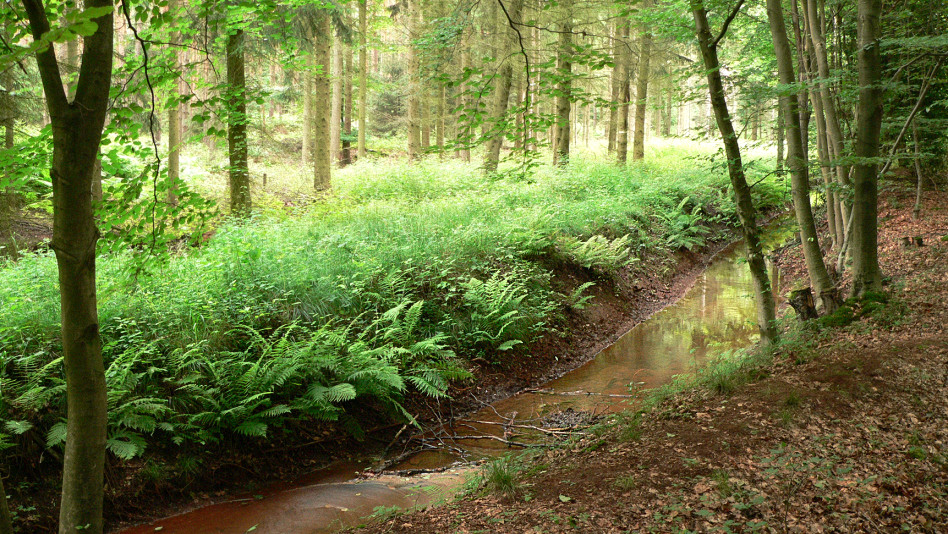
- The Wölpe near the castle Brunsburg at Heemsen

Location
- Country: Germany
- State: Lower Saxony

Physical characteristics
- Source
  - location: east of Nienburg
  - coordinates: 52°39′26″N 9°14′58″E
  - elevation: 26 m above sea level (NN)
- Mouth
  - location: near Rethem into the Aller
  - coordinates: 52°46′38″N 9°21′52″E
  - elevation: 18 m above sea level (NN)
- Length: 16.6 km (10.3 mi)

Basin features
- Progression: Alpe→ Aller→ Weser→ North Sea
- Landmarks: Small towns: Nienburg, Rethem; Villages: Anderten, Stöcken
- Tributaries
  - left: Schipsegraben (branches off again)
  - right: Schwarze Riede, Weißer Graben

The Wölpe is a river of Lower Saxony, Germany. It is about 17 km (11 mi) long and a left tributary of the Alpe.

The Wölpe has its source in a depression southeast of Erichshagen-Wölpe, a village in the borough of Nienburg and flows towards the northeast. In front of Rethem the Weiße Graben ("White Ditch") links the Wölpe with the Alpe. The Alpe-Wolpe-Umfluter then discharges into the Aller near Wohlendorf in the borough of Rethem. The waterway has been considerably straightened. It flows through woods, grassland and cultivated fields. According to the 2000 Water Quality Chart issued by the NLWKN it is critically polluted throughout (quality class II−III).

== History ==
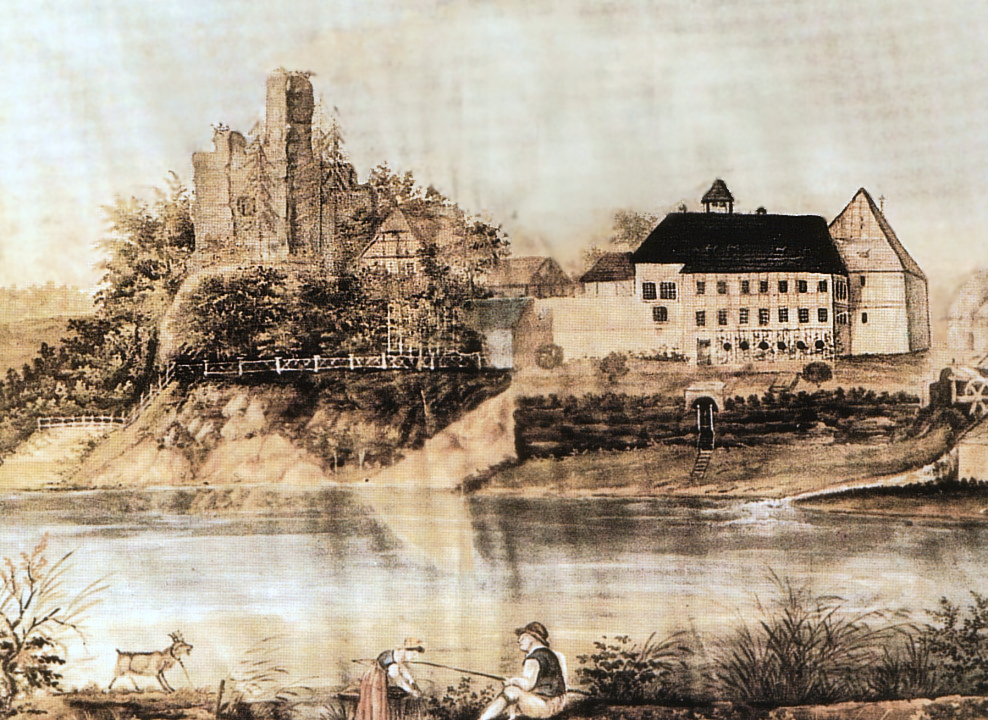
Painting of Wölpe Castle in 1823, with the Wölpe in front widened to a moat

At about 0.8 kilometres (0.5 mi) from the source near the Nienburg village of Erichshagen-Wölpe the Wölpe flows by the mound on which the former castle of the counts of Wölpe stood. During the Middle Ages the waterway was widened into a moat for the security of the fortified position and flowed around the castle built in the 12th century. After the destruction of the site in the 17th century, the castle moat and the Wölpe were filled with rubble.

About 4 km (2.5 mi) further on near Heemsen the Wölpe flows into the wooded area by the site of the 9th century Brunsburg castle. Here, too, the stream was probably used as part of the defences.

== See also ==
- List of rivers of Lower Saxony
