= Burgdorf-Peine Geest =

Coordinates: 52.3800°N 10.0644°E

The Burgdorf-Peine Geest (German: Burgdorf-Peiner Geest) is a geest landscape, dominated by end and ground moraines, between Hanover and Brunswick in North Germany, with an area of about 550 square kilometres (210 sq mi). Its natural borders are the Aller depression in the north, the Hildesheim Börde and, in places, the Mittelland Canal in the south the Oker valley in the east and the Hanoverian Moor Geest in the west.

Today it is bordered by the cities of Hanover and Brunswick and the towns of Burgdorf, Uetze, Vechelde, Peine and Lehrte. The whole geest region with its rural settlements has a distinctly rural character, with the exception of the town of Peine. The area is crossed from east to west by the Mittelland Canal, the A 2 motorway and the B 188 federal road. This area, also called the Burgdorf-Peine Geest (or Sand) Plateaus, belongs to the Lower Saxon geest countryside, that covers large parts of the North German Plain. The surface of the Burgdorf-Peine Geest is gently rolling. It is divided into depressions like the Fuhse (running from north to south) and valleys with fen country. In many areas the original forests have been cleared to make way for agriculture. One remaining large area of woodland is the Hämeler Forest near Hämelerwald. The landscape is dominated by arable fields, in which rye, oats and potatoes produce good returns. Asparagus is also widely grown on the dry, sandy soils, Burgdorf Asparagus (Burgdorfer Spargel) being particularly well known in Germany as a whole. The grazing of cattle is also a common mode of farming due to the poor soils. Near Hänigsen a loamy ground moraine rises close to the surface which improves the soil quality. The sandy parts of the geest are mainly covered with pine woods exploited by the forestry industry. Deciduous woods occur here and there in the shape of English oak and birch woods.
