= Laatzen =

- Town
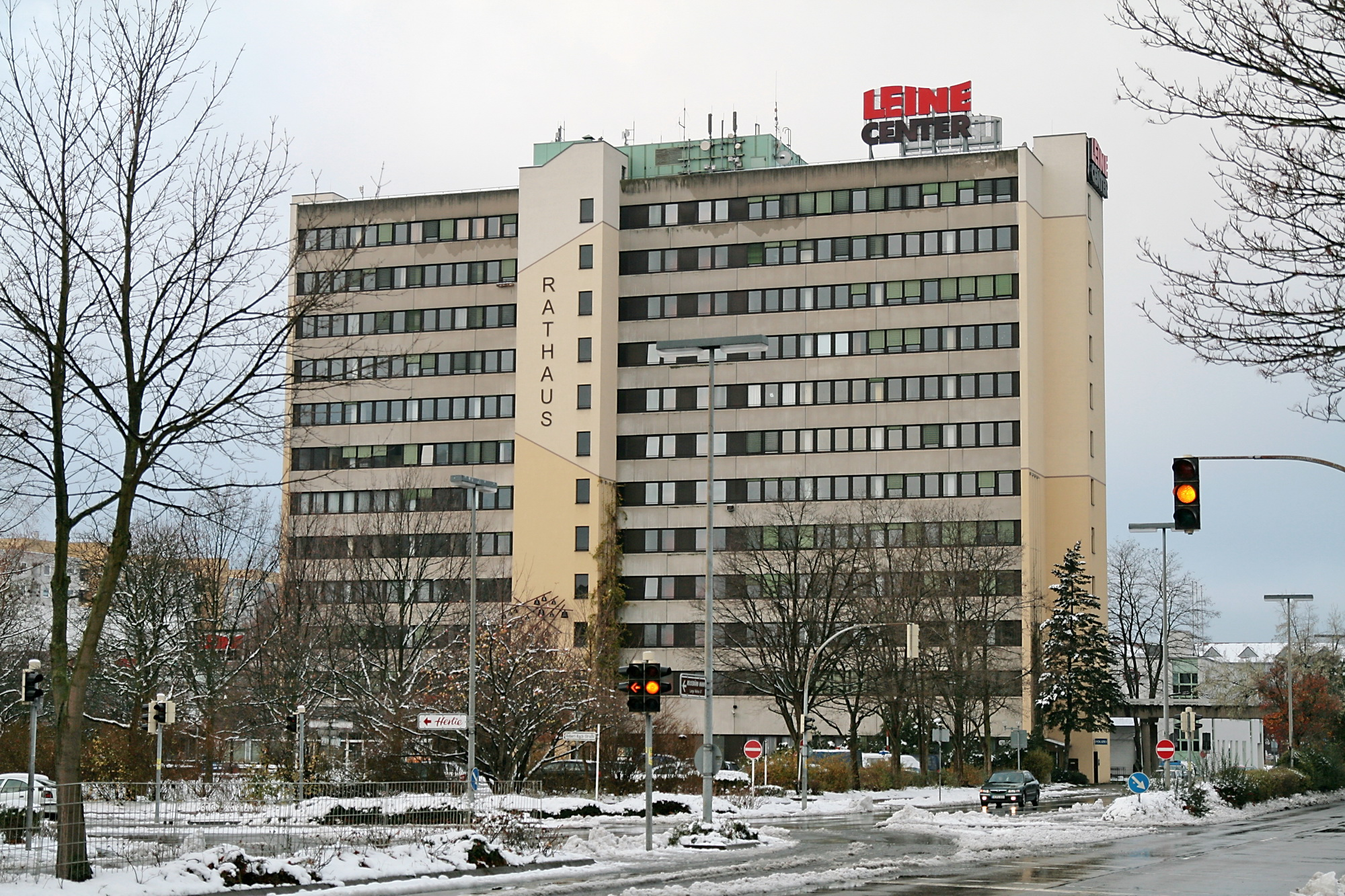
- Town hall

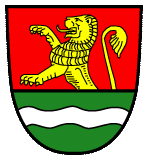
- Coat of arms

- Location of Laatzen within Hanover district
- Interactive map of Laatzen
- Location within Germany Location within Lower Saxony
- Coordinates: 52°19′N 09°48′E
- Country: Germany
- State: Lower Saxony
- District: Hanover

Government
  - Mayor (2021–26): Kai Eggert (SPD)

Area
  - Total: 34.16 km^{2} (13.19 sq mi)
- Elevation: 46–63 m (151–207 ft)

Population (2025-12-31)
  - Total: 41,724
  - Density: 1,221/km^{2} (3,163/sq mi)
- Time zone: UTC+01:00 (CET)
  - Summer (DST): UTC+02:00 (CEST)
- Postal codes: 30880
- Dialling codes: 0511, 05102
- Vehicle registration: H
- Website: www.laatzen.de

Laatzen (German pronunciation: [ˈlaːtsn̩]) is a town in Hanover Region, in Lower Saxony, Germany. It is situated directly south of Hanover.

== Division of the town ==
In 1964, the municipalities of Laatzen (nowadays about 22,000 inhabitants) and Grasdorf (3,500 inh.) were merged into the town of Laatzen. In 1974, the towns of Rethen (8,100 inh.), Gleidingen (4,300 inh.) and Ingeln-Oesselse (3,700 inh.) were joined to the town.

== Twin towns – sister cities ==
Laatzen is twinned with:

- Le Grand-Quevilly, France
- Gubin, Poland
- Waidhofen an der Ybbs, Austria

== See also ==
- Metropolitan region Hannover-Braunschweig-Göttingen-Wolfsburg
