= Hanoverian Moor Geest =

Landscape between Hanover and Nienburg in Lower Saxony, Germany

Coordinates: 52.4861°N 9.7686°E

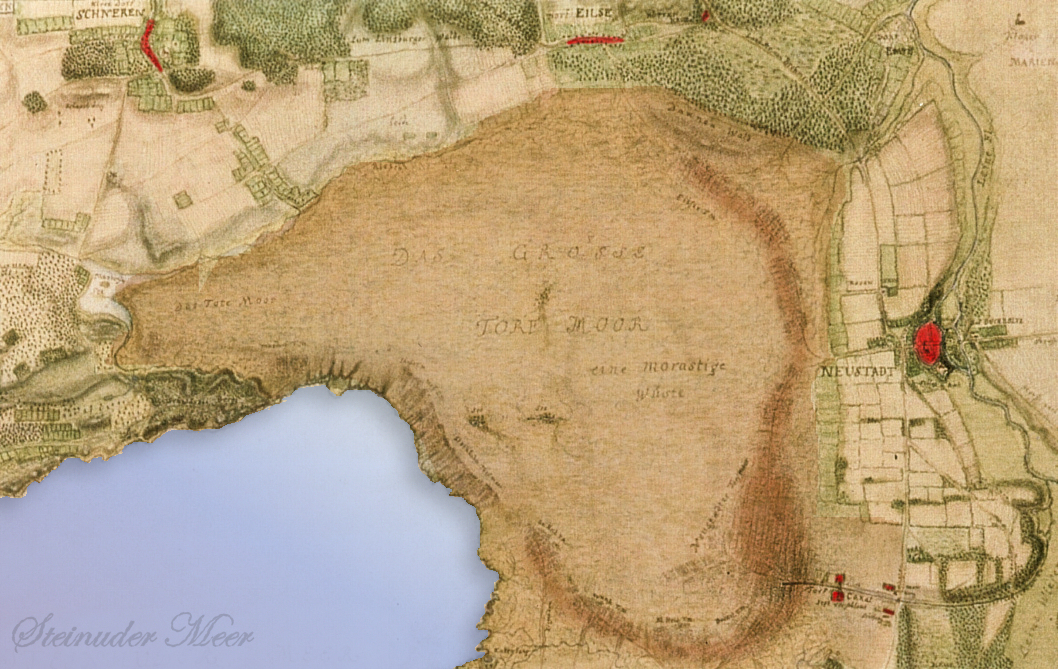
A 1770 map of the Totes Moor by Lake Steinhude

The Hanoverian Moor Geest (German: Hannoversche Moorgeest) is a gently rolling landscape between Hanover and Nienburg in the German state of Lower Saxony covering an area of around 800 square kilometres (310 sq mi). It belongs to the raised bog regions of northwest Germany, which cover the geest terrain formed during the ice age and which stretch from the Netherlands to the eastern border of Lower Saxony. The geest tract on the Hanoverian Moor Geest consists of a ground moraine plateau with a height of 50–85 metres (164–279 ft) above sea level that is dominated by bog. Its natural boundaries are the Aller glacial valley to the north and the Burgdorf-Peine Geest to the east.

This geest terrain, with its small villages, has a distinctly rural character. The exception is the town of Neustadt am Rübenberge. Within the region's borders lies Lake Steinhude, a lake 30 square kilometres (12 sq mi) in area, in a shallow basin. Originally this inland water was three times the size as can be seen from its boggy fringes to the west and southwest.

Much of the rest of the area used to consist of raised bogs. These were, however, frequently harvested for peat and cultivated for agricultural purposes. Most of the bogs that have been preserved have been much reduced in size, such as the Altwarmbüchen Moor, the Bissendorf Moor, the Helstorf Moor, the Schwarzes Moor, the Totes Moor and the Otternhagen Moor. Peat-cutting has resulted in artificial arable fields that have a boggy character. This makes their agricultural use quite limited. The forests consist mainly of pine trees used by the forestry industry. Deciduous woods occur occasionally on the end moraines. The depressions are extensively used by farmers for grassland. Whilst most of the bogs are under conservation protection today, the Totes Moor near Neustadt will still be used to harvest industrial peat on a large scale until about 2019.

== Conservation project ==
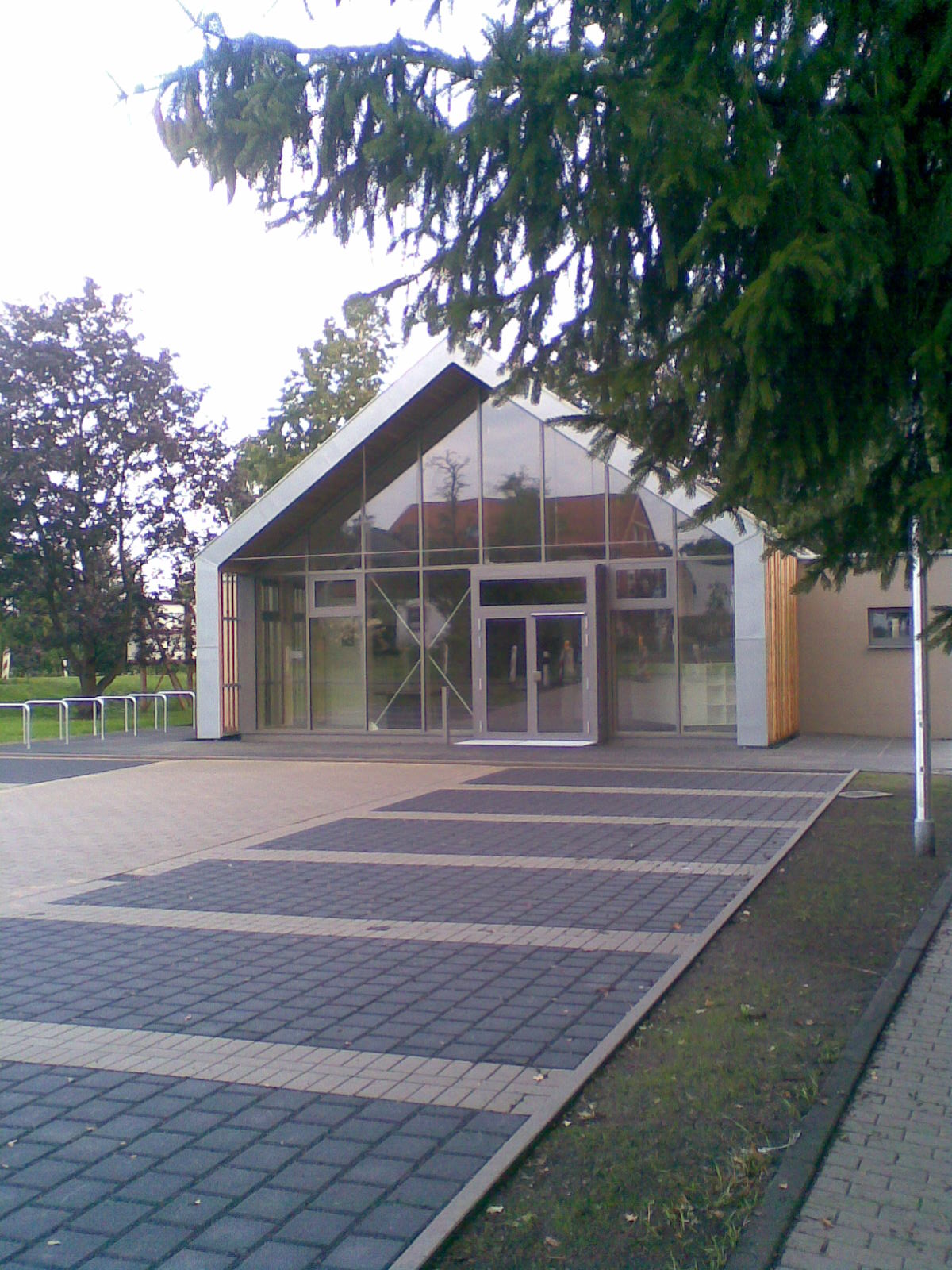
MOORiZ Moor Information Centre in Resse

From 2006 to 2016, the Hanover Region ran a nature conservation project, the Hannoversche Moorgeest, under which the four moors of the moor geest are to be permanently protected: Bissendorf Moor, Helstorf Moor, Otternhagen Moor and the Black Moor.

Since August 2011, the moor information centre, MOORiZ, of the Hanover Region has been located in Resse. On an area of around 350 square metres (3,800 sq ft), a permanent exhibition is presented with the focus on the moors – and here in particular on the Hanoverian Moor Geest. Lectures, meetings and readings can be held in a lecture room, primarily on the subject of moors and nature, but also from other cultural areas. Interested groups and organizations are given the opportunity to present themselves in the MOORiZ.
