= Raed Saleh =

German politician

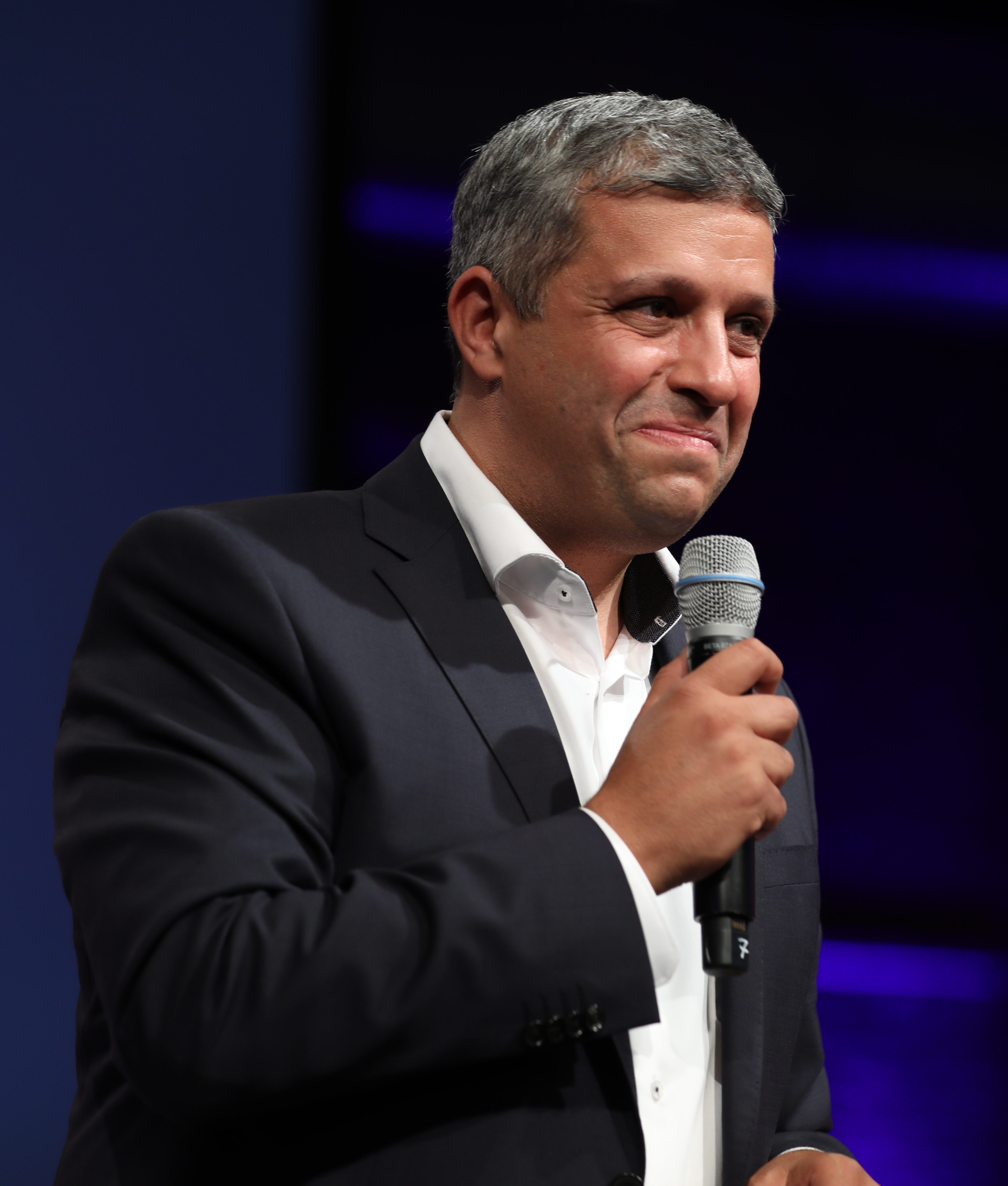
- Saleh in 2021

Leader of the Social Democratic Party in Berlin
- In office 28 November 2020 – May 2024 Serving with Franziska Giffey
- Preceded by: Michael Müller
- Succeeded by: Nicola Böcker-Giannini; Martin Hikel

Leader of the Social Democratic Party in the Abgeordnetenhaus of Berlin
- Incumbent
- Assumed office 1 December 2011
- Preceded by: Michael Müller

Member of the Abgeordnetenhaus of Berlin
- Incumbent
- Assumed office 17 September 2006

Personal details
- Born: Raed Saleh; 10 June 1977 (age 49) Sebastia, West Bank, Palestine
- Party: SPD

Raed Saleh (born 10 June 1977) is a German politician of the Social Democratic Party (SPD). He is serving as parliamentary leader of the SPD in the Abgeordnetenhaus of Berlin since 2011, and co-leader of the Berlin branch of the SPD since 2020.

== Life ==
Saleh was born in Palestine, in the town of Sebastia in the West Bank. His family moved to Germany in 1982, when Raed was five years old. His father found work in a wholesale bakery and his mother took care of their nine children. Saleh attended the Birkenhain elementary school and the Lily-Braun-Gymnasium in Spandau, from which he graduated in 1997.

While in school, Saleh began working at Burger King and, after dropping out of medical school, worked his way up from grill to management. After graduating from high school, he advanced to operations management at Mitrovski Fast Food GmbH in 1997, where he was a group executive from 2001 to 2006.

He is the founder and co-owner of the online print shop Mandaro Media Company in Hakenfelde, founded in 2005.

Saleh is married and has two sons. He is an avowed Muslim.

== Political career ==
Saleh joined the Social Democratic Party in 1995 at the age of seventeen. In 2002, he was elected to the executive committee of the Spandau branch of the party, and in 2008 became chairman. He was elected to the Abgeordnetenhaus of Berlin in 2006, winning the constituency of Spandau 2. In December 2011, he succeeded Michael Müller as parliamentary leader of the SPD in the Abgeordnetenhaus.

After Klaus Wowereit announced his resignation as Governing Mayor of Berlin in August 2014, Saleh ran in the contest to succeed him. He competed against state chairman Jan Stöß and Senator for Urban Development Michael Müller. Saleh placed third with 19.6% of votes to Stöß's 20.8% and Müller's 59.1%.

On 28 November 2020, Saleh was elected co-leader of the Berlin SPD alongside Franziska Giffey. He was approved with 68.7% of votes while Giffey won 89.4%. In the 2021 Berlin state election, Giffey was lead candidate and candidate for Governing Mayor, while Saleh was re-elected to a fourth term in the Spandau 2 constituency.
