= Le Grand-Quevilly =

- Commune
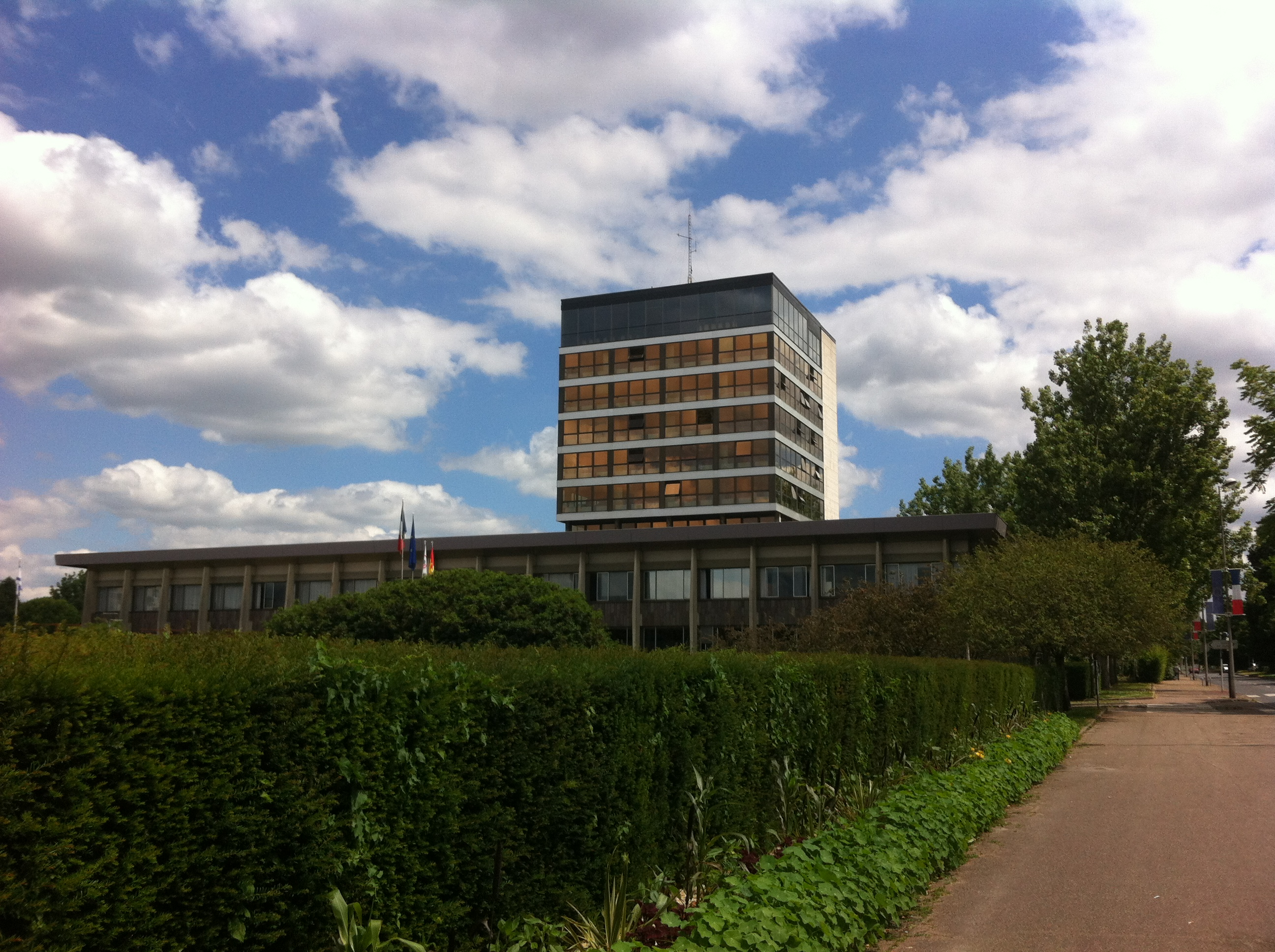
- The Hôtel de Ville

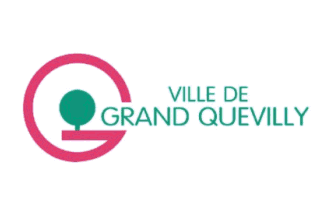
- Flag Coat of arms
- Location of Le Grand-Quevilly
- Location within France Location within Normandy
- Coordinates: 49°24′26″N 1°03′11″E
- Country: France
- Region: Normandy
- Department: Seine-Maritime
- Arrondissement: Rouen
- Canton: Le Grand-Quevilly
- Intercommunality: Métropole Rouen Normandie

Government
  - Mayor (2026–32): Nicolas Rouly
- Area^{1}: 11.11 km^{2} (4.29 sq mi)
- Elevation: 42 m (138 ft)
- Highest elevation: 68 m (223 ft)
- Lowest elevation: 1 m (3.3 ft)
- Population (2023): 25,789
  - Density: 2,321/km^{2} (6,012/sq mi)
- Time zone: UTC+01:00 (CET)
  - Summer (DST): UTC+02:00 (CEST)
- INSEE/Postal code: 76322 /76120
- Website: grandquevilly.fr
- ^{1} French Land Register data, which excludes lakes, ponds, glaciers > 1 km^{2} (0.386 sq mi or 247 acres) and river estuaries.

Le Grand-Quevilly [lə ɡʁɑ̃ kəviji, keviji] is a commune in the Seine-Maritime department in the Normandy region in north-western France.

== History ==
The Hôtel de Ville was completed in 1974.

== Geography ==
The town is third largest suburb of Rouen, a port with considerable light industry and chemical industry situated just 3 miles (5 kilometres) southwest of the centre of Rouen, at the junction of the D 3, D 492 and the D 338 roads.

== Population ==
Historical population

Year	Pop.	±% p.a.
1793	1,241	—
1800	1,235	−0.07%
1806	1,278	+0.57%
1821	1,460	+0.89%
1831	1,578	+0.78%
1836	1,440	−1.81%
1841	1,585	+1.94%
1846	1,598	+0.16%
1851	1,555	−0.54%
1856	1,557	+0.03%
1861	1,548	−0.12%
1866	1,519	−0.38%
1872	1,613	+1.01%
1876	1,618	+0.08%
1881	1,731	+1.36%
1886	1,813	+0.93%
1891	1,773	−0.45%
1896	2,132	+3.76%
1901	2,048	−0.80%

Year	Pop.	±% p.a.
1906	2,209	+1.53%
1911	2,458	+2.16%
1921	4,120	+5.30%
1926	6,264	+8.74%
1931	7,683	+4.17%
1936	8,942	+3.08%
1946	9,857	+0.98%
1954	13,565	+4.07%
1962	18,727	+4.11%
1968	25,611	+5.36%
1975	31,963	+3.22%
1982	31,650	−0.14%
1990	27,658	−1.67%
1999	26,679	−0.40%
2007	26,162	−0.24%
2012	24,563	−1.25%
2017	25,698	+0.91%
2023	25,789	+0.06%

Source: EHESS and INSEE (1968-2023)

== Heraldry ==
Arms of Grand-Quevilly	the arms of Grand-Quevilly are blazoned : Gules, on a fess sable an escallop between two crosses bottony fitchy argent; all between a leopard Or armed and langued azure and the point of queville Or.

== Places of interest ==
- The Zénith de Rouen concert hall.
- The fifteenth-century manor house at Grand Aulnay.
- The church of Saint-Pierre, dating from the sixteenth century.

== Sport ==
The commune has a football team, Grand-Quevilly FC who play at the stade Marc-Massion.

== International relations ==
Le Grand-Quevilly is twinned with:

- Ness Ziona, Israel since 1964,
- Morondava, Madagascar, since 1964,
- Laatzen, Germany, since 1966,
- Lévis, Canada, since 1969,
- Hinckley, England since 1976.

== Notable people ==
- Laurent Fabius, politician.
- Franck Dubosc, actor and comedian.
- Philippe Torreton, actor and politician

== See also ==
- Communes of the Seine-Maritime department
