= Zero Hour (Grabenhorst novel) =

1928 novel by Georg Grabenhorst

- Title page for Zero Hour (2006 edition)
- Author: Georg Grabenhorst
- Original title: Fahnenjunker Volkenborn
- Language: German
- Publication date: 1928
- Publication place: Germany
- English publication date: 1939

Zero Hour (originally published as Fahnenjunker Volkenborn) is an autobiographical war novel by German author Georg Grabenhorst. The book was initially published in Leipzig Germany in 1928 and was translated into English the following year. Zero Hour was later re-published by the University of South Carolina Press in 2006, with an introduction by Robert Cowley.

The book has been compared to All Quiet on the Western Front.

== Synopsis ==
The book follows Hans Volkenborn's experiences in the German army during World War I. He initially goes into the war with some enthusiasm, taking pleasure in the camaraderie with his fellow soldiers. This eventually turns sour as he goes through the toil and bloodshed of war.

== Reception ==
Initial reception in 1928 was mixed to positive, with the book garnering positive reviews from the Daily Sketch and the Daily News. The Miami News stated that it "does for a German officer what "All Quiet" did for the common soldier", while a reviewer for The Window commented that "one feels that the author's memory of details is defective".
