= Neustadt am Rübenberge =

- Town
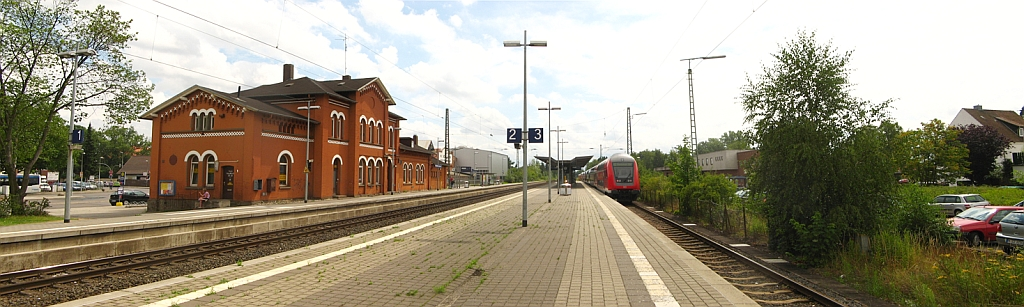
- Railway station

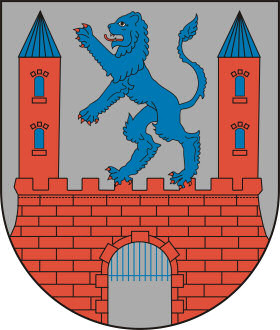
- Coat of arms

- Location of Neustadt am Rübenberge within Hanover district
- Interactive map of Neustadt am Rübenberge
- Location within Germany Location within Lower Saxony
- Coordinates: 52°30′N 9°28′E
- Country: Germany
- State: Lower Saxony
- District: Hanover
- Subdivisions: 34 districts

Government
  - Mayor (2019–24): Dominic Herbst (Greens)

Area
  - Total: 358.96 km^{2} (138.60 sq mi)
- Elevation: 36 m (118 ft)

Population (2025-12-31)
  - Total: 44,696
  - Density: 124.52/km^{2} (322.49/sq mi)
- Time zone: UTC+01:00 (CET)
  - Summer (DST): UTC+02:00 (CEST)
- Postal codes: 31535
- Dialling codes: 05032, 05034, 05036, 05072, 05073 and 05074
- Vehicle registration: H
- Website: www.neustadt-a-rbge.de

Neustadt am Rübenberge (German pronunciation: [ˈnɔʏʃtat ʔam ˈʁyːbn̩bɛʁɡə]; Low German: Niestadt) is a town in the district of Hannover, in Lower Saxony, Germany. At 357 km^{2} (138 sq mi), it is the 9th largest settlement in Germany by area (following Berlin, Hamburg and Cologne), though only about 45,000 inhabitants live there. It is in a region known as the Hanoverian Moor Geest.

== Founding ==
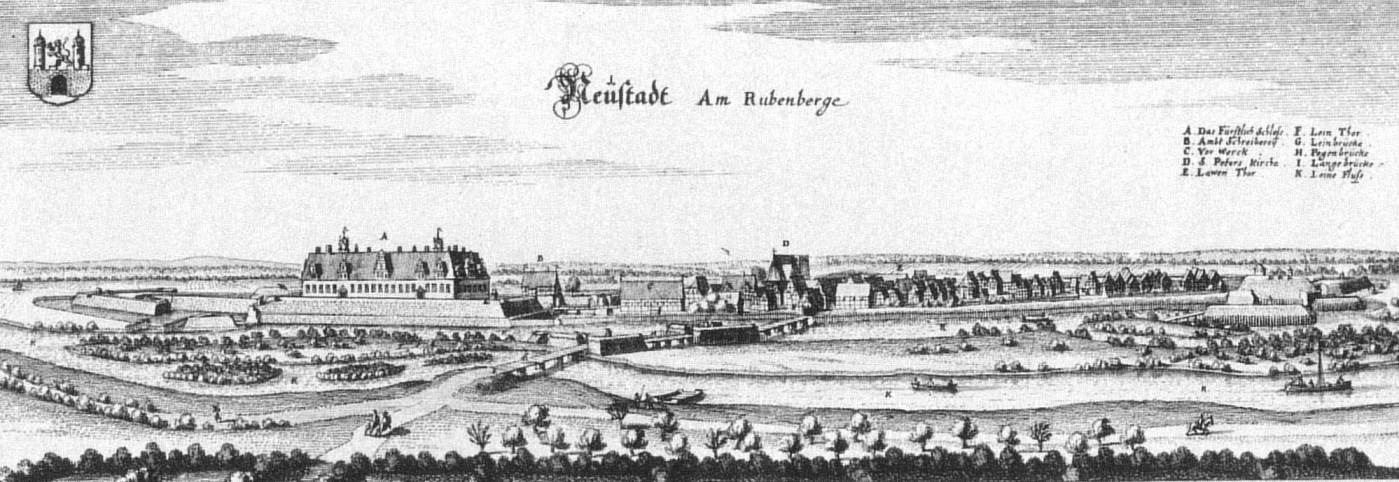
Copper engraving by Matthäus Merian, c. 1650

Neustadt am Rübenberge was founded around 1200, and recorded as a nova civitas (lit. 'new city') in 1215. In 1426 it was recorded as Nienstadt vor dem Rouwenberge und in 1523 as Nygestadt.

== Boroughs ==
- Amedorf
- Averhoy
- Basse
- Bevensen
- Bordenau
- Borstel
- Brase
- Büren
- Dudensen
- Eilvese
- Empede
- Esperke
- Evensen
- Hagen
- Helstorf
- Laderholz
- Lutter
- Luttmersen
- Mandelsloh
- Mardorf
- Mariensee
- Metel
- Niedernstöcken
- Nöpke
- Otternhagen
- Poggenhagen
- Scharrel
- Schneeren
- Stöckendrebber
- Suttorf
- Vesbeck
- Welze
- Wulfelade

== Mayor ==
Dominic Herbst (Alliance 90/The Greens) has served as mayor since 2019. He succeeded Uwe Sternbeck (Alliance 90/The Greens), who had been the mayor from 2004.

== Economy ==
=== Construction ===
- IKN GmbH (Ingenieurbüro-Kühlerbau-Neustadt GmbH), design and manufacturing of coolers and pyro lines

== Twin towns – sister cities ==
Neustadt am Rübenberge is twinned with:

- La Ferté-Macé, France (1980)

== Notable people ==
- Friedrich Dedekind (c. 1524 – 1598), humanist, theologian and writer
- Euricius Dedekind (1554–1619), composer
- Georg Caspar Schürmann (1672–1751), composer, singer
- Ludwig Christoph Heinrich Hölty (1748–1776), poet of ballads.
- Gerhard von Scharnhorst (1755–1813), Prussian General and army reformer.
- Georg Grabenhorst (1899–1997), author of Zero Hour
- Melanie Brinkmann (born 1974), virologist, worked on the Cytomegalovirus.
- Sami Haddadin (born 1980), electrical engineer, computer scientist and university professor re. robotics and artificial intelligence

=== Sport ===
- Robert Enke (1977–2009), football goalkeeper, died here; played 287 games and 8 for Germany
- Deniz Aycicek (born 1990), footballer, played over 200 games
- Sebastian Ernst (born 1995), footballer, played over 250 games

== See also ==
- Eilvese transmitter (demolished in 1931)
