= Hanover Region =

District in Lower Saxony, Germany

Coordinates: 52°25′12″N 9°43′12″E

Hanover
- District
- Flag Coat of arms
- Country: Germany
- State: Lower Saxony
- Capital: Hanover

Government
  - District admin.: Steffen Krach (SPD)

Area
  - Total: 2,290 km^{2} (880 sq mi)

Population (31 December 2023)
  - Total: 1,138,943
  - Density: 497/km^{2} (1,290/sq mi)
- Time zone: UTC+01:00 (CET)
  - Summer (DST): UTC+02:00 (CEST)
- Vehicle registration: H
- Website: www.region-hannover.de

Hanover Region (German: Region Hannover) is a district in Lower Saxony, Germany. It is bounded by (from the north and clockwise) the districts of Heidekreis, Celle, Gifhorn, Peine, Hildesheim, Hameln-Pyrmont, Schaumburg and Nienburg.

The Hanover Region district has a unique legal status among the districts of Lower Saxony. It includes the city of Hanover (the state capital) which has the same privileges as a kreisfreie Stadt, a city that is not part of a district. As a consequence, the district is much larger in population than any other district of the state. Its administrative body is the regional parliament (Regionsparlament), headed by the regional president (Regionspräsident), which since 2021 is Steffen Krach (SPD). The members of the regional parliament are elected once every five years and the regional president is elected also every five years in local elections.

== History ==
The city of Hanover was not part of the district until 2001, when the old Hanover District (Landkreis Hannover) and the city then known officially as District-free City of Hanover (kreisfreie Stadt Hannover) were merged in order to form the new Hanover Region district, not to be confused with the former governmental district of Hanover (Regierungsbezirk Hannover).

During World War II, Hanover was the headquarters (Hauptquartier) of Military District XI (Wehrkreis XI), which was responsible for Braunschweig, Anhalt, and part of Hanover. It was also the garrison town for the 71st Infantry Division of the German Army.

== Geography ==
The district surrounds the city of Hanover and includes the outskirts of its metropolitan area. The Leine river enters the district in the south, runs through Hanover and leaves to the north. In the northwest is the Steinhuder Meer, a lake with an area of 32 km^{2} (12 sq mi), within the region known as the Hanoverian Moor Geest.

== Coat of arms ==
The coat of arms was granted on May 1, 2003. The cloverleaf is from the arms of the city of Hanover. The lion was the heraldic animal of the Welfen family, which ruled the region from the Middle Ages until 1866.

== Towns and municipalities ==
Clickable map of towns and municipalities in the district

=== Towns ===
Town	Capital	Area (km^{2})	Population (2015)	Location
Barsinghausen	Barsinghausen	102.65 km^{2}	33,608	
Burgdorf	Burgdorf	112.26 km^{2}	30,147	
Burgwedel	Burgwedel	151.96 km^{2}	20,654	
Garbsen	Garbsen	79.31 km^{2}	60,590	
Gehrden	Gehrden	42.97 km^{2}	14,624	
Hanover	Hanover	204.01 km^{2}	532,163	
Hemmingen	Hemmingen	31.65 km^{2}	18,793	
Laatzen	Laatzen	34.05 km^{2}	40,939	
Langenhagen	Langenhagen	71.99 km^{2}	53,323	
Lehrte	Lehrte	127 km^{2}	43,639	
Neustadt am Rübenberge	Neustadt am Rübenberge	357 km^{2}	43,931	
Pattensen	Pattensen	67 km^{2}	14,324	
Ronnenberg	Ronnenberg	37.78 km^{2}	23,752	
Seelze	Seelze	54 km^{2}	33,283	
Sehnde	Sehnde	103.44 km^{2}	23,489	
Springe	Springe	159.78 km^{2}	28,682	
Wunstorf	Wunstorf	126.60 km^{2}	41,251	

=== Municipalities ===
Municipalities	Capital	Area /km^{2}	Population (2015)	Location
Isernhagen	Isernhagen	59.72 km^{2}	23,792	
Uetze	Uetze	140.56 km^{2}	20,103	
Wennigsen	Wennigsen	53.78 km^{2}	14,036	
Wedemark	Wedemark	173 km^{2}	29,358	

Election results for the Regional Assembly since 2001

Parties and voter associations		Prozent 2021	Sitze 2021	Prozent 2016	Sitze 2016	Prozent 2011	Sitze 2011	Prozent 2006	Sitze 2006	Prozent 2001	Sitze 2001
SPD	Sozialdemokratische Partei Deutschlands	29,9	25	32,3	26	36,4	31	39,7	33	42,4	37
CDU	Christlich Demokratische Union Deutschlands	26,2	22	29,0	24	31,0	26	35,2	30	36,2	31
Grüne	Bündnis 90/Die Grünen	21,3	18	13,6	12	19,0	16	10,9	9	9,1	8
FDP	Freie Demokratische Partei	6,5	5	5,4	5	3,1	3	7,3	6	6,3	5
AfD	Alternative für Deutschland	5,1	4	10,1	9	–	–	–	–	–	–
Linke	Die Linke	3,6	3	4,8	4	2,5	3	–	–	1,4	1
Tierschutz	Partei Mensch Umwelt Tierschutz	1,7	1	–	–	–	–	–	–	–	–
PARTEI	Partei für Arbeit, Rechtsstaat, Tierschutz, Elitenförderung und basisdemokratische Initiative	1,6	1	0,9	1	–	–	–	–	–	–
Basis	Grassroots Democratic Party of Germany (Basisdemokratische Partei Deutschland)	1,0	1	–	–	–	–	–	–	–	–
Piraten	Piratenpartei Deutschland	0,9	1	1,6	1	3,0	2	–	–	–	–
HAN	The Hanoverians	0,8	1	1,9	2	2,7	2	–	–	–	–
FW	Free Voters (Freie Wähler)	0,8	1	–	–	–	–	–	–	–	–
Volt	Volt Deutschland	0,6	1	–	–	–	–	–	–	–	–
BF	BürgerForum	–	–	–	–	1,1	1	1,1	1	–	–
BSG	Bündnis für Soziale Gerechtigkeit	–	–	–	–	0,6	0	0,7	1	–	–
REP	Die Republikaner	–	–	–	–	–	–	1,5	1	1,4	1
Sonstige		0,2	0	1,5	0	1,6	0	3,8	3	3,1	1
Gesamt		100 %	84	100 %	84	100 %	84	100 %	84	100 %	84
Voter turnout		54,7 %		54,6 %		49,7 %		47,0 %		52,3 %	

=== Inhabitants ===
Year	Residents
2001	1,122,038
2005	1,128,543
2010	1,132,130
2015	1,144,481
2017	1,153,063
2018	1,157,624

== See also ==
- Metropolitan region Hannover-Braunschweig-Göttingen-Wolfsburg
