= Rehburg Hills =

Hill range in Lower Saxony, Germany

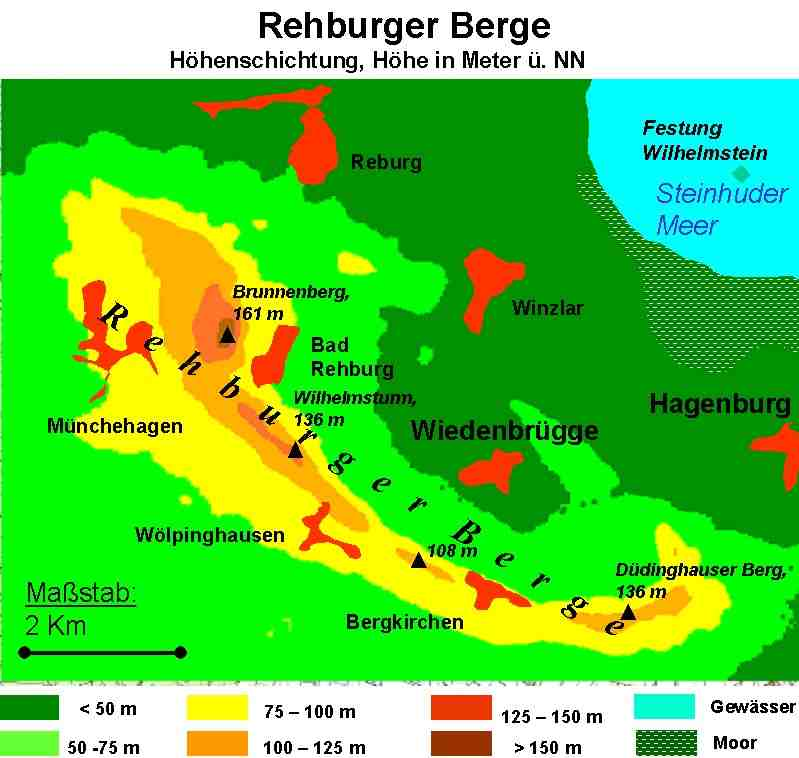

Highest point
- Peak: Brunnenberg
- Elevation: 161.4 m above NN

Geography
- Location: Nienburg and Schaumburg districts
- Country: Germany
- State: Lower Saxony
- Range coordinates: 52°26′33″N 9°12′37″E

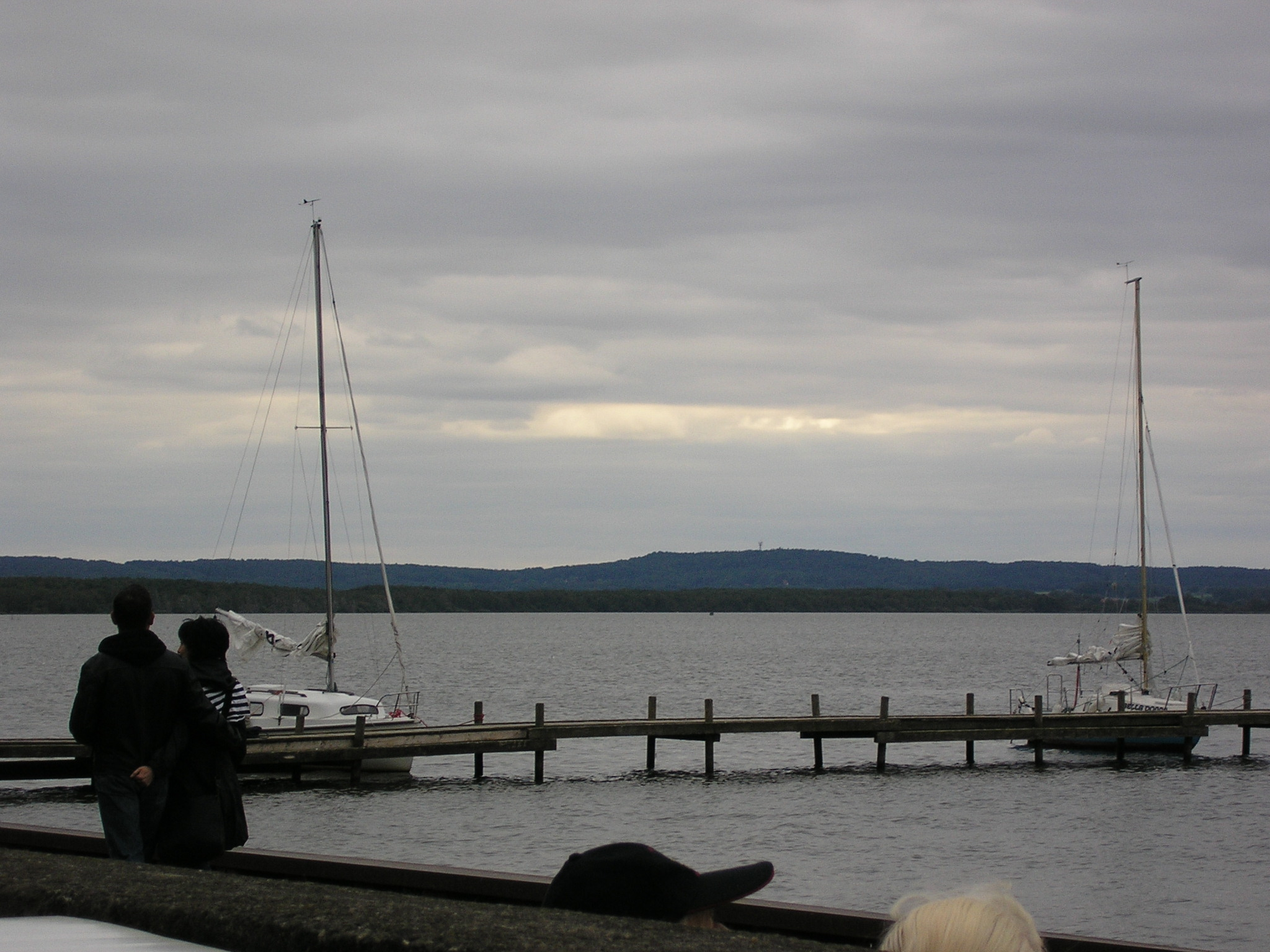
The Rehburg Hills from the southern shore of Lake Steinhude near Steinhude

The Rehburg Hills (German: Rehburger Berge) are a hill range, up to 161.4 m above sea level (NN), in the districts of Nienburg and Schaumburg in Lower Saxony, Germany.

== Origin of the name ==
The Rehburg Hills and their foothills give the impression of being several small neighbouring hills. The little village of Bad Rehburg was a well-known spa and bathing resort in the 18th and 19th centuries. As a result, they have been referred to for centuries as the Rehburger Berge or Rehburg Hills.

== Geography ==
=== Geographical location ===
The Rehburg Hills occupy the southern part of the district of Nienburg and northern part of the district of Schaumburg on the southwestern edge of the Steinhuder Meer Nature Park. They lie between Rehburg-Loccum (to the northwest), Hagenburg (to the east) and Sachsenhagen (to the south) and run close by the village of Bad Rehburg that gives them their name. The latter, like the settlements of Loccum, Rehburg, Münchehagen in the west and Winzlar in the east belong to the borough of Rehburg-Loccum. The municipalities of Wölpinghausen (including Bergkirchen) and Auhagen (including Düdinghausen) in the south also lie on the ridge. Away to the south is the Schaumburg Forest, whilst to the northeast is Lake Steinhude (Steinhuder Meer).

Not far to the north of the Rehburg Hills runs a section of the stream known as the Steinhuder Meerbach; to the south is part of the Mittelland Canal, to the west is part of the upper course of the Fulde and about 10 kilometres (6.2 mi) west of the ridge are the middle reaches of the River Weser.

=== Individual hills ===
The highest elevation in the Rehburg Hills is the Brunnenberg at 161.4 m above sea level (NN). Other summits include the Wölpinghauser Berg (136 m or 446 ft; with its Wilhelm Tower), in the far east, the Düdinghäuser Berg (121 m or 397 ft), the Loccumer Berg (118.7 m or 389 ft) and the Atgeberg (101.0 m or 331.4 ft).

From the high points of the Rehburg Hills there are views across to the River Weser, Lake Steinhude, the Deister, Bückeberg, Schaumburg Forest, Stemweder Berg and Wiehen Hills.

== Geology ==
The bowl-shaped Rehburg Hills were formed by relief inversion. They fall steeply away to the north, but its southern slopes are more gently. The ridge is, from a geological viewpoint, a saddle (the Rehburg Saddle or Rehburger Sattel), which consists of solid rock.

The bulging of the saddle occurred as a result of the movement of Malm Salt (not Zechstein Salt) deep underground that forced the overlying, younger layers of solid rock upwards. In later times the softer rocks in the centre of the saddle (clay and marl, Upper Jurassic) weathered away, creating a morphological depression (relief inversion). The weather-resistant sandstones (Wealden Sandstones of the Lower Cretaceous) form the flanks of the saddle and produce a bowl-shaped ridge.

In the Wealden Sandstone there are coal deposits of low quality and thickness. After 1945 some of this coal was mined. Sandstone was quarried in Düdinghausen and to a large extent near Münchehagen.

The Rehburger Berge are covered by a mixed woodland of beech and spruce and surrounded by large areas of moor and lowland. Of the many small streams and becks that drain the ridge, the most notable are the Hülsebeeke in the west near Loccum and the Winzlaer Grenzgraben in the west.

== Points of interest ==
Amongst the points of interest in the area are the:

- Münchehagen Dinosaur Park: numerous giant dinosaur tracks near Münchehagen
- 800-year-old Cistercian abbey at Loccum, founded in 1163
- Late Romanesque, 13th century church in Loccum, visible from afar
- ecological conservation station of Steinhuder Meer (ÖSSM) in Winzlar
- Wilhelm Tower on the Wölpinghäuser Berg, built in 1848
- Holländer windmill near Bergkirchen, worked from 1850 to 1955
- Evangelical church of St. Catharine in Bergkirchen, built around 1150
- Quarry and coal shaft near Düdinghausen
- Historic spa resort of Bad Rehburg from the Romantic period
- Chapel of St. Friederike, Bad Rehburg
- Foundations of an old abbey near the abandoned village of Asbeke from the 11th century
- Ringwall site of Düsselburg probably from the Early Middle Ages, 3 kilometres (1.9 mi) northwest of Rehburg
