= Bückeberg =

Hill range in Germany

Bückeberg / Bückeberge
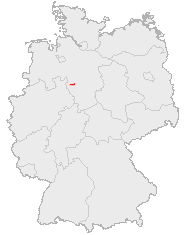
- Location of the Bückeberg ridge in Germany

Highest point
- Peak: Diebische Ecke
- Elevation: 375 m above NHN

Geography
- State(s): Between Bad Eilsen and Bad Nenndorf; Schaumburg; Lower Saxony (Germany)
- Range coordinates: 52°15′36″N 9°12′42″E
- Parent range: Calenberg Uplands

Geology
- Rock type(s): Limestone, sandstone, shale, stone coal

The Bückeberg (German pronunciation: [ˈbʏkəˌbɛʁk]; also the Bückeberge) is a small hill range, up to 375 metres (1,230 ft) high, in the Calenberg Uplands between the Harrl and the Deister in central Germany, and is often considered part of the Weser Uplands. It lies in the district of Schaumburg, and stretches for some 20 km (12 mi) from west to east from Bückeburg and the village of Bad Eilsen towards Bad Nenndorf.

== Topography ==
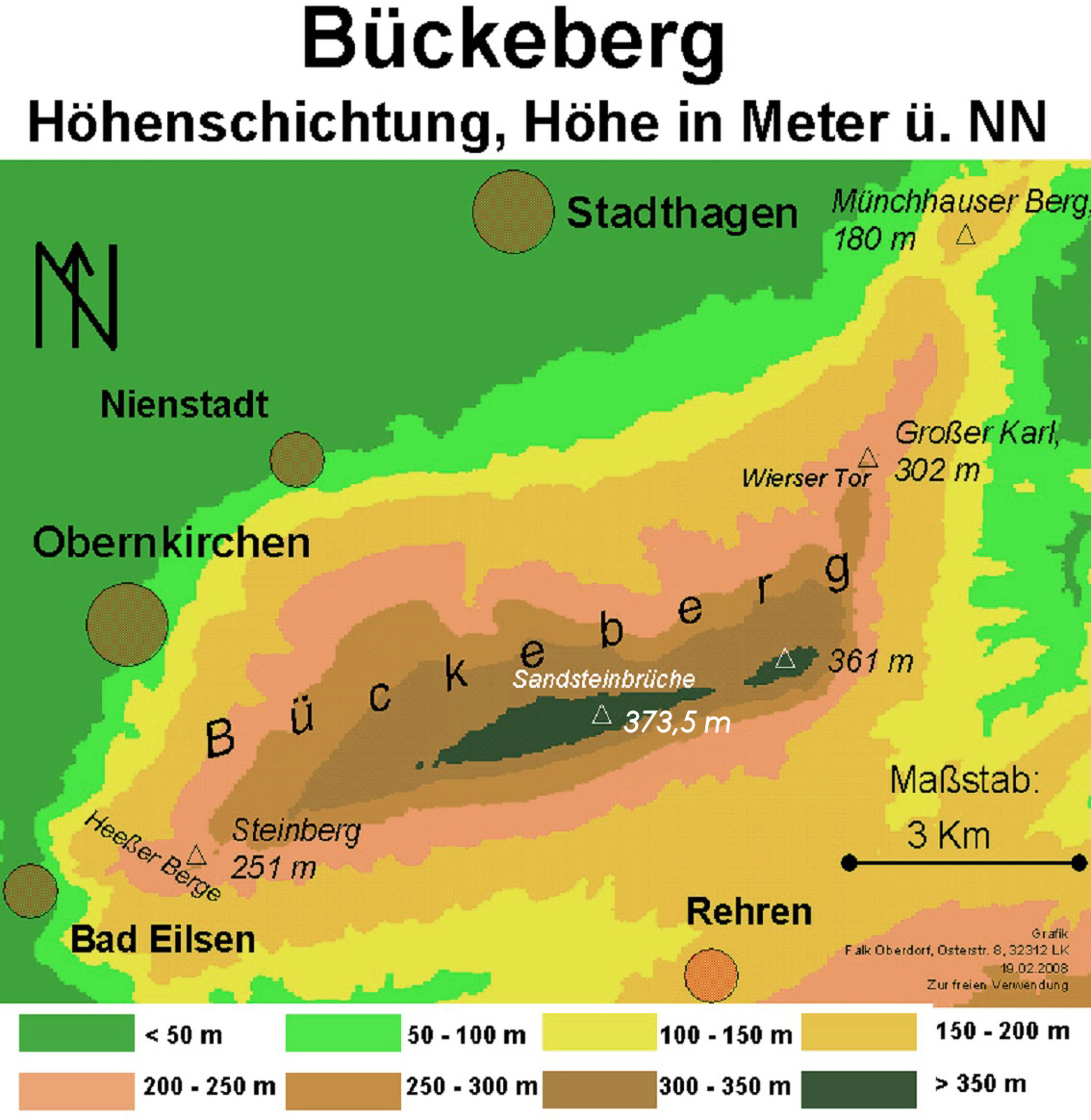
Physical map of the Bückeberg hills

The ridge runs from southwest to northeast for about 20 kilometres (12 mi) at heights of 200 m (660 ft) to about 75 m (246 ft). It only has a few summits, like the Bückeberg (or Diebische Ecke) (ca. 375 metres (1,230 ft)), east of the track junction on the Eulenburg Way, and the Großer Karl (301.7 metres (990 ft)) near Reinsdorf. Here its course swings north and ends with the foothills of Münchhausener Berg and Heisterberg near Beckedorf. The gentle northern dip slope descends into the North German Plain, whilst the steeper southern scarp slope drops into the Aue valley, through which the A 2 autobahn runs. The Heeßer Berge in the west is a nature reserve.

The ridge is cut through in two places: at Bad Eilsen near the western end, where the river Aue has cut a gap in the ridge, and at the Reinser Paß (pass) near the eastern end.

== Geology ==
The crest of the Bückeberg consists of a hard, light sandstone known as Obernkirchen sandstone, which is one of the best in Europe and, because of its transshipment through Bremen, is known internationally as "Bremen Sandstone". The western Bückeberg contains clay and anthracite that used to be mined here. In the eastern section, there are Jurassic limestones with halite (rock salt) deposits. It is here near Soldorf that the brine springs emerge which extend to the spa town of Bad Nenndorf, where they are used for bathing.

== Hills in the Bückeberg ==
The hills and high points of the Bückeberg include the following − sorted by height in metres (m) above sea level (Normalhöhennull or NHN):

- Diebische Ecke (375 m (1,230 ft) m), between Liekwegen and Rehren
- unnamed summit (361.3 m (1,185 ft); see Military use section), between Hörkamp and Altenhagen
- Großer Karl (301.7 m (990 ft)), between Hörkamp, Reinsdorf and Sundern
- Steinberg (260.3 m (854 ft)), between Krainhagen and Rolfshagen
- Heeßer Berge (240 m (790 ft)), between Bad Eilsen, Krainhagen and Rolfshagen
- Harrlberg (213 m (699 ft)), on the Harrl ridge between Bad Eilsen and Bückeburg
- Münchhausener Berg (185.1 m (607 ft)), between Heuerßen and Groß Hegesdorf
- Heisterberg (168 m (551 ft)), southwest of Beckedorf

== Streams ==
Numerous streams drain the Bückeberg and feed the Aue (Bückeburger Aue) and the Rodenberger Aue. Several of them are only winterbournes.

- Hühnerbach
- Kalterbach
- Krebshäger Bach
- Flothbach
- Bornau
- Vornhäger Bach
- Hessbach
- Flahbach
- Salzbach
- Riesbach
- Tiefersicksbeeke

== Flora and fauna ==
The Bückeberg is covered in mixed woods of beech and spruce, but there are also many other types of tree like the coast Douglas-fir, birch, maple, and hornbeam. In addition there are many species of wild flower including the spring snowflake, mezereon, common broom, and various ferns and fungi.

The Bückeberg is home to the roe deer, mouflon, and wild boar. More rarely seen are the barn owl, common kestrel, red kite, pine marten, and stone marten.

== Economic utilisation ==
In addition to forestry, quarrying plays an important role. The Obernkirchen sandstone of the Bückeberg has been used in many well-known buildings, such as Cologne Cathedral, the town halls in Bremen, and Antwerp and the stock exchange in Bergen, Norway. Coal has also been mined in Bückeberg for centuries.

== Military use ==
On the Bückeberg near Obernkirchen at the northeastern end of the ridgeway is a former NATO anti-aircraft missile station. The terrain, which has grown wild since the withdrawal of Dutch soldiers, is surrounded by fencing and, today, is almost solely used for landing exercises by helicopters from the nearby School of Army Aviation in Bückeburg. Occasionally, tented exercises lasting several days by Training Group (Lehrgruppe) B take place on the site.

== Leisure activities ==
There are a number of scenic walking trails on the Bückeberg with views over the valleys, but also many gloomy forestry tracks without any signing. When walking it is advisable to take maps and the relevant information. On the Bückeberg near Obernkirchen there is the Youth Training Leisure Centre (Jugend-Bildung-Freizeit-Zentrum or JBF-Zentrum).

== Forest restaurants in and around the Bückeberg ==
- Süße Mutter - forest restaurant in Auetal-Rolfshagen- open again since June 2006.
- Gasthaus Walter (from 1870 to 1996 in the ownership of the Walter family) was reopened in June 2008 as "Rainer Ballin's Event-Gasthof Walter zum Bückeberg".

== Towns and villages of the Bückeberg ==
- Ahnsen
- Apelern
- Auetal
- Bad Eilsen
- Bad Nenndorf
- Beckedorf
- Heeßen
- Heuerßen
- Nienstädt
- Obernkirchen
- Rodenberg
- Stadthagen

== History ==
- In the quarries, there are many traces of dinosaurs. Paleontological discoveries in September 2008 caused a worldwide sensation. In the quarry on the Bückeberg, dinosaur tracks were found including those of raptors, which were of great scientific importance. Five footprint casts of an iguanodon may be seen today in Bad Nenndorf near the castle. Similar casts from the Bückeberg may also be viewed in Bückeburg, Obernkirchen and other locations.
- At Hühnerbach near Obernkirchen are the ruins of an old Saxon fortress, the Bückeburg with its circular ramparts.
- On the Heisterberg near Beckedorf is the Heisterschlösschen, a circular rampart with a 65 metres (213 ft) diameter dating to the 10th century.

== Etymology ==
On several maps the hills are called the "Bückeberge" ("Bücke hills"). In the Lower Saxon dialect it is not unusual to treat such a name as singular (Wir gehen zum Bückeberge = "we are going to the Bückeberge"). In the Nazi era, attempts were made to rename the Bückeberg in Schaumburg as the "Bückeburg Forest" or "Bückeberge", in order to distinguish it from the hills of the same name near Hagenohsen, where the Reich's harvest festival was celebrated. Occasionally, the plural is found even before 1933 in old maps. On official maps the plural form was first used in 1961. The Lower Saxony State Survey Department (Landesvermessungsamt Niedersachsen or LGN) laid down in 2005 that the name Bückeberg would be used for the ridge in its fullest extent, so that the traditional name, used for centuries, has now been adopted on the maps. The Bückeberg lies in the old Germanic district (Gau) of Bukkigau (Bukki = beech), and therefore means the "hill in the beeches" (Berg im Bukki) or the "Beech Hill" (Buchen-Berg).

== Myths ==
Old folk tales tell of the so-called "Böxenwolf", a type of werewolf, which ambushed lone travellers walking through the Bückeberg, or even between the surrounding villages, at night. It would jump on their back and then jump off again after a while.
