= Schaumburg Forest =

Coordinates: 52°21′N 9°05′E

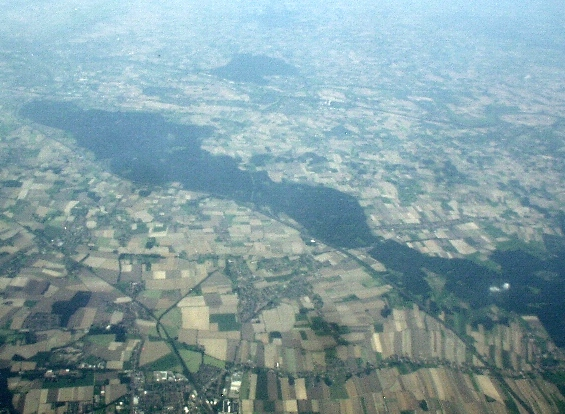
Schaumburg Forest. Below left: Stadthagen

The Schaumburg Forest (German: Schaumburger Wald, pronounced [ˈʃaʊmbʊʁgɐ ˈvalt]) is a wooded region, about 80 m above sea level (NN) with an area of around 40 km², in the district of Schaumburg in the German federal state of Lower Saxony.

== Location ==
The Schaumburg Forest lies immediately east of the Lower Saxony's state border with North Rhine-Westphalia in the northwestern part of the district of Schaumburg not far east of the River Weser, south of the Rehburg Hills and northwest of the Mittelland Canal. It extends from Wölpinghausen in the north, to Pollhagen and Meerbeck in the east (on the far side and east of the county town of Stadthagen and the town of Obernkirchen), to Bückeburg in the south, to the town of Minden in the southwest and the town of Petershagen and municipality of Wiedensahl in the west. To the north it almost borders, with the Rehburg Hills, on the district of Nienburg.

The Schaumburg Forest, which is 19.5 km long and up to 4 km wide, lies on the North German Plain at between about 45 and 80 m above NN; its highest point is west of the L 371 state road (Landesstraße) from Wölpinghausen in the north to Pollhagen in the south. The boundary of Minden-Lübbecke district which lies in North Rhine-Westphalia, runs almost exactly along the northwest border of the forest. That said, several tongues of wood project into Westphalian territory, (e.g. south of Petershagen-Borstel). In addition the numerous nearby copses in the vicinity of the town of Petershagen may be counted as part of the Schaumburg Forest in a broader sense, so that Minden-Lübbecke can claim part of the forest for itself.

A wide track called the Landwehrallee runs through the eastern areas of the central part of the Schaumburg Forest roughly parallel to the Mittelland Canal and close to the edge of the forest. The track runs from Mittelbrink-Landwehr (part of Niedernwöhren) in the northeast to Rusbend (part of Bückeburg) in the southeast.

== History ==
In earlier times, the Schaumburg Forest was a border area between the Principality of Schaumburg-Lippe and Prussia; today parts of its western perimeter form part of the border with North Rhine-Westphalia. A boundary embankment, the Schaumburger Landwehr, runs for about 25 km through the Schaumburg Forest. It once extended as far as Lake Steinhude and, in the Middle Ages, marked the border of Schaumburg-Lippe with Westphalia. The Schaumburg Forest is the western remnant of the historic Dülwald forest that once extended from Minden to Lake Steinhude and was a border forest of the old Saxon districts or Gaue.

In the middle of the forest, on the road connecting Petershagen to Bückeburg, is the Baum Hunting Lodge and a small mausoleum, the final resting place of the Schaumburg count, William and his family.

There is another mausoleum in the southern part of the Schaumburg Forest about 1 km north of the road connecting Meinsen and Cammer (both part of Bückeburg). It contains the coffins of the founder of Bad Eilsen, Princess Juliana of Schaumburg-Lippe (1761-1799), and her mother. Juliana had become a widow early and the grave of her secret lover, the Prince's senior forester, Clemens August von Kaas (1760-1832), is very well hidden in the forest east of Baum Castle.

Schaumburg Forest became of cultural and historical significance because the artist, Wilhelm Busch, often drew and painted at sites along its forest edges and in its glades. His birthplace, Wiedensahl, where he later often stayed, was close to the western edge of the forest.

== Flora and fauna ==
Schaumburg Forest forms about half of the timber forest in Bückeburg belonging to Alexander, Prince of Schaumburg-Lippe. The other half of the forest, that is, the entire woodland area north of the L 372 road from Wiedensahl to Niedernwöhren, is owned by the state of Lower Saxony. Schaumburg Forest is a mixed forest, predominantly of oak and beech with remnants of old oak wood pasture. Since time immemorial, the great oaks were the most important economic factor in the Schaumburg Forest.

The forest is very popular with cyclists because of its spacious and shady woodland trails that on flat terrain that often stretch for miles. There are also two tourist-oriented cycleways through the Schaumburg Forest with thematic information by the trackside, route maps and directions: the "Wilhelm Busch Route" and the "Prince's Route" (Fürstenroute), which cross almost the whole length of the Schaumburg Forest from Spießingshol in the north to Rusbend in the south. Refreshments are available in Hiddenserborn (by Mittelland Canal on the edge of the forest), in Mittelbrink (in the middle of the forest) and in Wiedensahl close by the forest.

Of the forest's natural wildlife, the large stags and herds of wild boar are particularly noteworthy. In addition, the forest is also home to fallow deer and roe deer.

== Sources ==
- Anna-Franziska von Schweinitz: Die Derneburger Grabpyramide und ihr Vorbild im Baumer Forst. In: Hildesheimer Jahrbuch für Stadt und Stift Hildesheim Bd. 70/71, 1998/99, pp. 219–231
- Anna-Franziska von Schweinitz: Architektur für die Ewigkeit. Der Begräbnisgarten des Grafen Wilhelm zu Schaumburg-Lippe. In: Kritische Berichte, 29.2001 No. 2, pp. 21–29
