= List of American Friends Service Committee Nobel nominees =

Quaker Nobel nominees

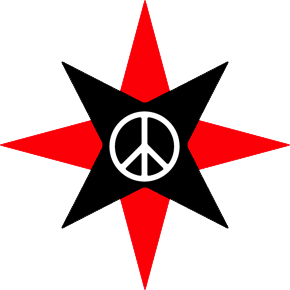
The Quaker Peace Star has been used in a variety of forms ever since, representing Quaker work for peace and the relief of suffering caused by war.

In 1947, the American Friends Service Committee (AFSC) and the Quaker Peace and Social Witness (QPSW) (previously known as the Friends Service Council) jointly received the Nobel Peace Prize on behalf of all Quakers around the world "for their pioneering work in the international peace movement and compassionate effort to relieve human suffering, thereby promoting the fraternity between nations." The award was established in accordance to Alfred Nobel's will, specifically to individuals or groups "who shall have done the most or the best work for fraternity between nations, for the abolition or reduction of standing armies and for the holding and promotion of peace congresses."

As previous Nobel laureates are qualified to nominate annually according to the Nobel Foundation's statutes, AFSC and QPSW formed a Nobel Peace Prize Nominating Task Group which selects and recommends future Nobel laureates – individuals or organizations – who they believe best manifests "the divine spark in action in the human family." Six of the ASFC Nobel nominees were eventually awarded namely to John Boyd Orr (1949), Dag Hammarskjöld (1961; posthumously), Martin Luther King Jr. (1964), Desmond Tutu (1984), Jimmy Carter (2002) and Nihon Hidankyo (2024).

== ASFC Nobel nominees ==
=== Criteria for Nobel nomination ===
Before a final nominee is unanimously agreed by the AFSC Board and recommended to the Norwegian Nobel Committee, the Nominating Task Group spends ten months annually discerning, through heavy research, prayerful consideration and careful discussion. Aside from Alfred Nobel's criteria based on his 1895 will, the AFSC Nobel Peace Prize Nominating Task Group primarily observes the following criteria:

- 1. The candidate's commitment to nonviolent methods.
- 2. The quality of the candidate as a person and of her/his sustained contribution to peace.
- 3. The candidate's work on issues of peace, justice, human dignity, and the integrity of the environment.
- 4. The candidate’s possession of a worldview and/or global impact as opposed to a parochial concern.
- 5. Giving attention to candidates from all parts of the world.*
- 6. Noting crisis areas and considering candidates related to them only as a Nobel Prize may, by its timeliness and visibility, offer valuable support to a solution to the crisis.*
- 7. Considering the relevance of a candidate’s work to the work of AFSC or other Quaker experience.*

=== List of ASFC nominees for Nobel Peace Prize ===
Year	Image	Nominee	Born	Died	Motivations
1948		Mahatma Gandhi	2 October 1869 in Porbandar, Gujarat, India	30 January 1948 in New Delhi, India	"for advocating racial, social and political peace, and 'being a living incarnation of the ideal of peace itself' while leading the Indian nationalist movement in a non-violent struggle against British rule."
1949		John Boyd Orr	23 September 1880 in Kilmaurs, East Ayrshire, United Kingdom	25 June 1971 in Edzell, Angus, United Kingdom	"for having initiated the founding of the International Emergency Food Council in 1946 to meet the urgent need to revive agricultural production in order to prevent the famine that threatened numerous countries in the world."
1950		André Trocmé	7 April 1901 in Saint-Quentin, Somme, France	5 June 1971 in Geneva, Switzerland	
1950		Wilhelm Mensching	5 October 1887 in Lauenhagen, Germany	25 August 1964 in Stadthagen, Lower Saxony, Germany	
1951		Jawaharlal Nehru	14 November 1889 in Prayagraj, Uttar Pradesh, India	27 May 1964 in New Delhi, India	"for establishing parliamentary government in India and for his neutralist foreign policy and for upholding the same principles as Gandhi."
1952		Benegal Narsing Rau	26 February 1887 in Mangalore, Karnataka, India	30 November 1953 in Zürich, Switzerland	"for his contribution to bring about reconciliation between the Great Power Countries and the United Nations."
1953		William O. Douglas	16 October 1898 in Maine Township, Minnesota, United States	19 January 1980 in Bethesda, Maryland, United States	"for his work to improve economic undeveloped areas."
1954		Frank Porter Graham	14 October 1886 in Fayetteville, North Carolina, United States	16 February 1972 in Chapel Hill, North Carolina, United States	"for his work as a university teacher and for his work in the United Nations."
1955		André Trocmé	7 April 1901 in Saint-Quentin, Somme, France	5 June 1971 in Geneva, Switzerland	
1955		Wilhelm Mensching	5 October 1887 in Lauenhagen, Germany	25 August 1964 in Stadthagen, Lower Saxony, Germany	
1956		Elisabeth Rotten	15 February 1882 in Berlin, Germany	2 May 1962 in London, United Kingdom	"for her work for reconciliation and work in Pestalozzi Children Village in Switzerland."
1957		Service Civil International	founded in 1920 in Belgiëlei, Antwerp, Belgium		"for its significant international voluntary work camps throughout the world, providing constructive opportunities for young people to work for peace, and directing their efforts towards both physical rehabilitation and the important rebuilding of international understanding and fellowship."
1958	No nomination				
1959	No nomination				
1960		Norman Cousins	24 June 1915 in West Hoboken, New Jersey, United States	30 November 1990 in Los Angeles, California, United States	
1961		Dag Hammarskjöld	29 July 1905 in Jönköping, Sweden	18 September 1961 in Ndola, Zambia	
1962		Norman Cousins	24 June 1915 in West Hoboken, New Jersey, United States	30 November 1990 in Los Angeles, California, United States	"for challenging the policy and practice of nuclear defense and warfare."
1963		Martin Luther King Jr.	15 January 1929 in Atlanta, Georgia, United States	4 April 1968 in Memphis, Tennessee, United States	"for his work and witness which promotes the dignity and worth of the human person."
1964		Martin Luther King Jr.	15 January 1929 in Atlanta, Georgia, United States	4 April 1968 in Memphis, Tennessee, United States	"for his work and witness which promotes the dignity and worth of the human person."
1965		Norman Cousins	24 June 1915 in West Hoboken, New Jersey, United States	30 November 1990 in Los Angeles, California, United States	"for challenging the policy and practice of nuclear defense and warfare."
1966	No nomination				
1967		U Thant	22 January 1909 in Pantanaw, Maubin, Myanmar	25 December 1974 in New York City, United States	"for his work as Secretary General of the United Nations, wherein he is a most important international civil servant and is deeply and spiritually dedicated to the bringing of real peace to mankind."
1968		U Thant	22 January 1909 in Pantanaw, Maubin, Myanmar	25 December 1974 in New York City, United States	"for his work as Secretary General of the United Nations, wherein he is a most important international civil servant and is deeply and spiritually dedicated to the bringing of real peace to mankind."
1969		Danilo Dolci	28 June 1924 in Sežana, Slovenia	30 December 1997 in Trappeto, Palermo, Italy	"for his continuous work helping the desperately poor in western Sicily and his considerable success in leading them in nonviolent ways."
1970		International Fellowship of Reconciliation	August 1914 in Amsterdam, Netherlands		"for their service to peace, humanity, and reconciliation."
1970		United States Fellowship of Reconciliation	November 1915 in Garden City, New York, United States		"for their service to peace, humanity, and reconciliation."
1971		Cesar Chavez	31 March 1927 in Yuma, Arizona, United States	23 April 1993 in San Luis, Arizona, United States	"for the quality of leadership he has shown in the long struggle of farmworkers for human dignity and, through persevering efforts, seeks to combat poverty and injustice and build a new quality of relationship between men."
1972		U Thant	22 January 1909 in Pantanaw, Maubin, Myanmar	25 December 1974 in New York City, United States	
1973		Hélder Câmara	7 February 1909 in Fortaleza, Ceará, Brazil	27 August 1999 in Recife, Pernambuco, Brazil	
1974 1975		Cesar Chavez	31 March 1927 in Yuma, Arizona, United States	23 April 1993 in San Luis, Arizona, United States	
1974 1975		Hélder Câmara	7 February 1909 in Fortaleza, Ceará, Brazil	27 August 1999 in Recife, Pernambuco, Brazil	
1976		Committee of Cooperation for Peace in Chile	October 1973 in Santiago, Chile		
1977	No nomination				
1978		Stephen Biko	18 December 1946 in Tarkastad, Eastern Cape, South Africa	12 September 1977 in Pretoria, Gauteng, South Africa	
1979		Ham Seok-heon	13 March 1901; Yomju, North Pyongan, North Korea	4 February 1989; Seoul, South Korea	"for his lifelong commitment to peace and democracy, becoming an important Asian voice for human rights and non-violence known as 'seed idea' (ssi-al sasang)."
1980		Danilo Dolci	28 June 1924 in Sežana, Slovenia	30 December 1997 in Trappeto, Palermo, Italy	
1981		Desmond Tutu	7 October 1931 in Klerksdorp, Transvaal, South Africa	26 December 2021 in Cape Town, Western Cape, South Africa	
1982		Desmond Tutu	7 October 1931 in Klerksdorp, Transvaal, South Africa	26 December 2021 in Cape Town, Western Cape, South Africa	
1983		Mattityahu Peled	20 July 1923 in Haifa, Israel	10 March 1995 in Jerusalem, Israel	
1983		Issam Sartawi	1935 in Acre, Palestine	10 April 1983 in Albufeira, Faro, Portugal	
1984		United Nations Convention on the Law of the Sea	December 1982 in Montego Bay, Jamaica		
1986		Brian Urquhart	28 February 1919 in Bridport, Dorset, United Kingdom	2 January 2021 in Tyringham, Massachusetts, United States	"for his unparalleled contributions and significant role in the foundation of the United Nations."
1987		Brian Urquhart	28 February 1919 in Bridport, Dorset, United Kingdom	2 January 2021 in Tyringham, Massachusetts, United States	"for his unparalleled contributions and significant role in the foundation of the United Nations."
1988		Inga Thorsson	3 July 1915 in Malmö, Sweden	15 January 1994 in Stockholm, Sweden	
1988		Gro Harlem Brundtland	20 April 1939 in Bærum, Akershus, Norway	(aged 87)	
1989		Antonio Fortich	11 August 1913 in Sibulan, Negros Oriental, Philippines	2 July 2003 in Bacolod, Negros Occidental, Philippines	"for being a strong advocate of the rights of the poor and a critic of an unjust social economic system."
1990		Elise M. Boulding	6 July 1920 in Oslo, Norway	24 June 2010 in Needham, Massachusetts, United States	"for her work on non-violence and conflict resolution, and as a major contributor to creating the academic discipline of Peace and Conflict Studies."
1991		Jimmy Carter	1 October 1924 in Plains, Georgia, United States	29 December 2024 in Plains, Georgia, United States	
1992		Moon Ik-hwan	2 June 1918 in Longjing, Jilin, China	18 January 1994 in Fukuoka, Japan	
1993		Beyers Naudé	10 May 1915 in Roodepoort, Gauteng, South Africa	7 September 2004 in Johannesburg, South Africa	"for his role in the dismantling of apartheid, as fighter for human rights, and prophet and humane pastor to all who suffered under apartheid."
1994		Sulak Sivaraksa	27 March 1933 in Bangkok, Thailand	(aged 93)	"for his commitment in the quest for a development process that is rooted in democracy, justice and cultural integrity."
1995		Ibrahim Rugova	2 December 1944 in Cerrca, Kosovo	21 January 2006 in Pristina, Kosovo	"for his lifelong sacrifice and campaign for peace and democracy in Kosovo and for all the people of Kosovo."
1996		Preah Maha Ghosananda	23 May 1913 in Treang, Takéo, Cambodia	12 March 2007 in Northampton, Massachusetts, United States	
1997		Jimmy Carter	1 October 1924 in Plains, Georgia, United States	29 December 2024 in Plains, Georgia, United States	
1998		Samuel Ruíz García	3 November 1924 in Guanajuato, Mexico	24 January 2011 in Mexico City, Mexico	"for his exemplary struggle to translate moral and religious principles into a model for human service."
1999		Helen Prejean, C.S.J.	21 April 1939 in Baton Rouge, Louisiana, United States	(aged 87)	"for her religious voice of great clarity and challenge on the inhumanity of state-sponsored executions."
2000		Denis Halliday	10 January 1941 in Dublin, Ireland	(aged 85)	
2000		Kathy Kelly	10 December 1952 in Chicago, Illinois, United States	(aged 73)	
2001		Peace Brigades International	founded in 1981 in London, United Kingdom		
2002		Community of Sant'Egidio	founded in 1968 in Rome, Italy		
2003		Women in Black	founded in January 1988 in Jerusalem, Israel		
2004		Zackie Achmat	21 March 1962 in Vrededorp, Gauteng, South Africa	(aged 64)	"for having helped to galvanize a global movement to provide hope and gain access to treatment for those with HIV and AIDS."
2004		Treatment Action Campaign	founded in December 1998 in Cape Town, South Africa		"for having helped to galvanize a global movement to provide hope and gain access to treatment for those with HIV and AIDS."
2005		Nihon Hidankyō	founded in August 1956 in Shibadaimon, Minato, Tokyo, Japan		"for its contribution to the struggle for peace and for sanity in the management and perhaps the ultimate elimination of nuclear weapons."
2006		Ghassan Andoni	1956 in Beit Sahour, Bethlehem, Palestine	(aged 70)	"for their work to increase co-operation and understanding and their determination to strive for equality between their peoples within the framework of sovereign and democratic states."
2006		Jeff Halper	28 November 1946 in Boston, Massachusetts, United States	(aged 79)	"for their work to increase co-operation and understanding and their determination to strive for equality between their peoples within the framework of sovereign and democratic states."
2007		Peace Community of San José de Apartadó	March 1997 in Apartadó, Antioquia, Colombia		
2007		Asociación de Cabildos Indígenas del Norte del Cauca	January 1994 in Santander de Quilichao, Cauca, Colombia		
2008		Aminatou Haidar	24 July 1966 in Laayoune, Western Sahara	(aged 60)	
2009	No nomination.				
2010		Roy Bourgeois	15 December 1938 in Lutcher, Louisiana, United States	(aged 87)	
2010		School of the Americas Watch	founded in 1990 in Washington, D.C., United States		
2011	No nomination.				
2012		Hawa Abdi	17 May 1947 in Mogadishu, Somalia	5 August 2020 in Mogadishu, Somalia	
2013		Gene Sharp	21 January 1928 in North Baltimore, Ohio, United States	28 January 2018 in Boston, Massachusetts, United States	"for devoting the majority of his 84 years to studying nonviolent action, documenting the history of the strategies employed, analyzing how these techniques operate, and making the results accessible to the widest possible audience."
2014	No nomination				
2015		Victor Ochen	16 September 1981 in Lira, Uganda	(aged 45)	"for their work for transitional justice, while simultaneously promoting human rights through nonviolent means, nourishing the leadership skills of other young people, and challenging systemic issues that lead to the continued vulnerability and suffering of war victims."
2015		African Youth Initiative Network	founded in 2005 in Lira, Uganda		"for their work for transitional justice, while simultaneously promoting human rights through nonviolent means, nourishing the leadership skills of other young people, and challenging systemic issues that lead to the continued vulnerability and suffering of war victims."
2016		Nonviolent Peaceforce	founded in 2003 in New Delhi, India (headquartered in Geneva, Switzerland)		"for fostering dialogue among parties in conflict, reducing violence and nonviolently protecting unarmed civilians worldwide."
2017		Community Peacemaker Teams	1984 in Chicago, Illinois, United States		
2018		Search for Common Ground	founded in 1982 in Washington, D.C., United States		"for having made a profound impact in our world, inspiring and equipping people to find our shared humanity."
2019	The 2019 Nobel Peace Prize nominee asked that AFSC not publicize the nomination at this time.				
2020	No nomination				
2021		Mwatana for Human Rights	founded in 2007 in Sana'a, Yemen		"for their work during and after the two world wars to feed starving children and help Europe rebuild itself"
2021		Campaign Against Arms Trade (CAAT)	founded in 1974 in London, United Kingdom		"for their work during and after the two world wars to feed starving children and help Europe rebuild itself"
2022		Miriam Were	12 April 1940 in Kakamega, Western Province, Kenya	(aged 86)	"for her tireless work since the 1970s in promoting trust between governments, health authorities, and the citizenry through culturally sensitive programs."
2023		Florida Rights Restoration Coalition (FRRC)	founded in 2019 in Orlando, Florida, United States		"for their work in building democracies, supporting the human right to representation by government, and working towards a better organized and peaceful world."
2023		National Council of Churches of Kenya (NCCK)	founded in June 1913 in Nairobi, Kenya		"for their work in building democracies, supporting the human right to representation by government, and working towards a better organized and peaceful world."
2024	No nomination				
2025	No nomination				
