= Harrl =

Hill range in Germany

Coordinates: 52°14.8′N 9°4.7′E

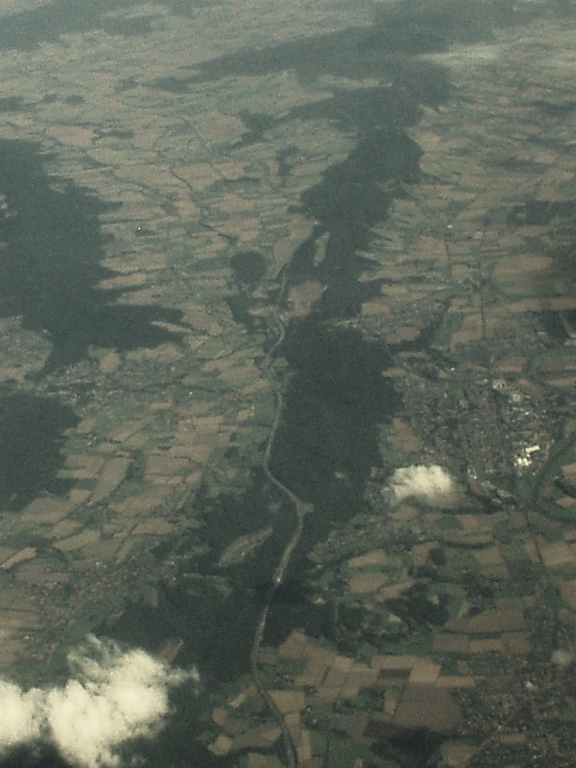
Aerial photograph of the Weser Uplands (centre) with the Bückeburg and Harrl ridges (centre left). The Harrl is the smaller wooded ridge to the front

The Harrl is a high, wooded western outlier of the Bückeberg hill ridge in the Weser Uplands of central Germany. It is up to 213 m above sea level (NN) and lies in the Lower Saxon county of Schaumburg.

== Location and geology ==
The Harrl runs through the Weser Uplands-Schaumburg-Hamelin Nature Park from Bückeburg in the northwest to Bad Eilsen in the southeast, passing Ahnsen to the southwest. East of Bad Eilsen and right of the Bückeburger Aue it is adjoined by the Bückeberg itself. The longitudinal axis of the Harrl is more than 3 kilometres long and it has an area of around 3.5 km^{2}. Its highest point is the Harrlberg which lies roughly in the centre of the ridge. To the southwest runs the B 83 federal road.

The Harrl, like the Bückeberg, is made of sandstone (Obernkirchen Sandstone) and claystones (Upper and Lower Wealden slate) of the Lower Cretaceous.

== Tourism ==
An observation tower stands on the Harrlberg known as the Ida Tower (Idaturm). In Harrl there are numerous hiking trails and footpaths. These include the Bückeberge Way which runs over the Harrl. This is a 60-kilometre-long major trail in the northern Weser Uplands and is designated as the "X 11".
