= Nienstädt =

- Municipality
- Location of Nienstädt within Schaumburg district
- Interactive map of Nienstädt
- Location within Germany Location within Lower Saxony
- Coordinates: 52°17′21″N 9°10′7″E
- Country: Germany
- State: Lower Saxony
- District: Schaumburg
- Municipal assoc.: Nienstädt
- Subdivisions: 4

Government
  - Mayor: Gerhard Widdel (SPD)

Area
  - Total: 8.31 km^{2} (3.21 sq mi)
- Elevation: 104 m (341 ft)

Population (2025-12-31)
  - Total: 4,229
  - Density: 509/km^{2} (1,320/sq mi)
- Time zone: UTC+01:00 (CET)
  - Summer (DST): UTC+02:00 (CEST)
- Postal codes: 31688
- Dialling codes: 05721, 05724
- Vehicle registration: SHG

Nienstädt (German pronunciation: [ˈniːnʃtɛt]) is a municipality in the district of Schaumburg, in Lower Saxony, Germany. It is situated approximately 4 km southwest of Stadthagen, and 17 km east of Minden.

Nienstädt is part of the Samtgemeinde ("collective municipality") Nienstädt.

== Geography ==
Nienstädt lies on the northern slopes of the Bückeberge between Bückeburg and Stadthagen on the B 65 federal highway.

The four parishes in the municipality are Sülbeck, Liekwegen, Wackerfeld and Meinefeld. While Sülbeck and Nienstädt are bisected by the B 65, Liekwegen runs along the Bückeberg as a ribbon village. Wackerfeld and Meinefeld lie in open country north of Nienstädt.

Neighbouring communities (clockwise) are the towns of Stadthagen and Obernkirchen and the village of Helpsen.
