= Bad Rehburg =

Coordinates: 52°26′23″N 09°13′04″E

Bad Rehburg is a former spa resort in the Rehburg Hills in central Germany. Today Bad Rehburg is a village in the borough of Rehburg-Loccum in the south of the district of Nienburg/Weser in Lower Saxony. The village lies at an elevation of 85 m above NN and has around 800 inhabitants.

== Location and transport ==
Bad Rehburg lies on the B 441 federal road and about 25 km from the A 2 motorway and its exit of Wunstorf-Luthe. The village nestles between Lake Steinhude and the River Weser on the heights of the Rehburg Hills around 5 km southwest of Lake Steinhude and about 12 km east of the Weser. Bad Rehburg is almost surrounded by woodland; only in the northeast do a few fields border the houses. Since 1997 a "citizen's bus" (Bürgerbus) has run between the villages in Rehburg-Loccum.
