= Lieven Gevaert =

Belgian industrialist

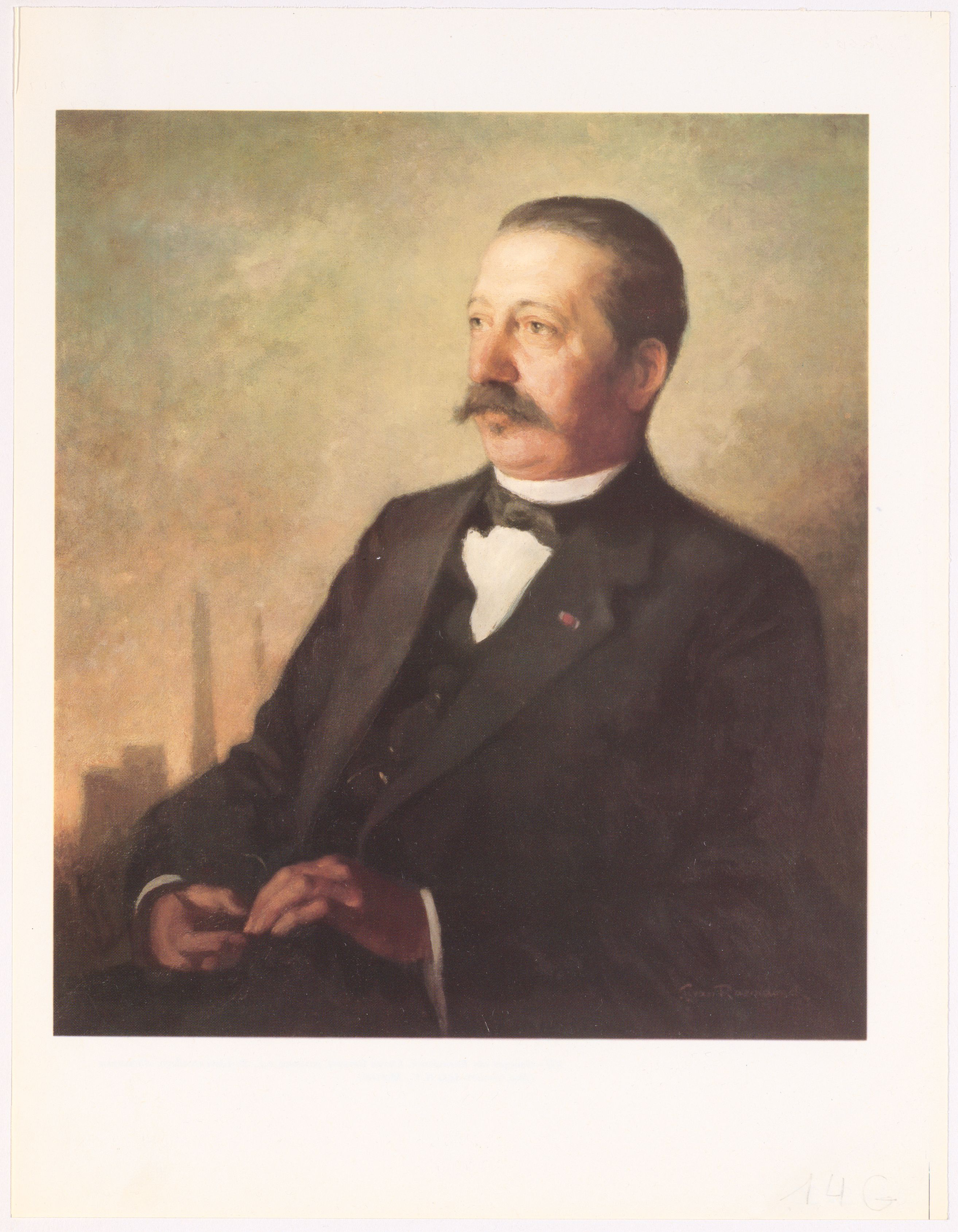
- Born: 28 May 1868; Antwerp, Belgium
- Died: 2 February 1935 (aged 66); The Hague, Netherlands
- Occupation: Industrialist
- Organization: Gevaert & Co

Lieven Gevaert (28 May 1868 – 2 February 1935) was a Belgian industrialist. His father died when he was only three years old. He started his career in the company he founded together with his mother in 1889, which produced photographic paper according to traditional methods. In 1894, he founded the company Gevaert & Co, which in 1920, was transformed to N.V Gevaert Photo-producten, merged in 1964 with Agfa AG to become Gevaert-Agfa NV and later Agfa-Gevaert NV.

Already at an early age, he felt socially responsible and wanted to advance the status of Dutch in Belgium. His personal ideas were strongly influenced by the papal encyclical Rerum novarum (1891) and the writings of Lodewijk De Raet. He supported several Flemish initiatives as a manager, but stayed outside politics. His main objectives were the introduction of Dutch as a business language, and the foundation of a sound Dutch-speaking education as a means to establish a Flemish elite. In 1926, when the Vlaamsch Handelsverbond (Vlaams Economisch Verbond, VEV) was founded, Gevaert was its first chairman. Later, he founded the Sint-Lievenscollege in Antwerp, where he lived on Belgiëlei.
