= Suthfeld =

- Municipality
- Coat of arms

- Location of Suthfeld within Schaumburg district
- Interactive map of Suthfeld
- Location within Germany Location within Lower Saxony
- Coordinates: 52°21′27″N 9°23′42″E
- Country: Germany
- State: Lower Saxony
- District: Schaumburg
- Municipal assoc.: Nenndorf
- Subdivisions: 3

Government
  - Mayor: Katrin Hösl (SPD)

Area
  - Total: 5.05 km^{2} (1.95 sq mi)
- Elevation: 56 m (184 ft)

Population (2025-12-31)
  - Total: 1,398
  - Density: 277/km^{2} (717/sq mi)
- Time zone: UTC+01:00 (CET)
  - Summer (DST): UTC+02:00 (CEST)
- Postal codes: 31555
- Dialling codes: 05723
- Vehicle registration: SHG
- Website: www.suthfeld.de

Suthfeld is a municipality in the district of Schaumburg, in Lower Saxony, Germany.
