= Hohnhorst =

- Municipality
- Location of Hohnhorst within Schaumburg district
- Interactive map of Hohnhorst
- Location within Germany Location within Lower Saxony
- Coordinates: 52°22′N 9°22′E
- Country: Germany
- State: Lower Saxony
- District: Schaumburg
- Municipal assoc.: Nenndorf
- Subdivisions: 6

Government
  - Mayor: Otto Lattwesen (CDU)

Area
  - Total: 12 km^{2} (4.6 sq mi)
- Elevation: 60 m (200 ft)

Population (2025-12-31)
  - Total: 2,280
  - Density: 190/km^{2} (490/sq mi)
- Time zone: UTC+01:00 (CET)
  - Summer (DST): UTC+02:00 (CEST)
- Postal codes: 31559
- Dialling codes: 05723
- Vehicle registration: SHG
- Website: www.hohnhorst-online.de

Hohnhorst is a municipality in the district of Schaumburg, in Lower Saxony, Germany.
