= Buchholz, Schaumburg =

Buchholz
- Municipality
- Location of Buchholz within Schaumburg district
- Interactive map of Buchholz
- Location within Germany Location within Lower Saxony
- Coordinates: 52°13′34″N 9°7′25″E
- Country: Germany
- State: Lower Saxony
- District: Schaumburg
- Municipal assoc.: Eilsen

Government
  - Mayor: Hartmut Krause

Area
  - Total: 1.77 km^{2} (0.68 sq mi)
- Elevation: 133 m (436 ft)

Population (2025-12-31)
  - Total: 712
  - Density: 402/km^{2} (1,040/sq mi)
- Time zone: UTC+01:00 (CET)
  - Summer (DST): UTC+02:00 (CEST)
- Postal codes: 31710
- Dialling codes: 05751
- Vehicle registration: SHG

Buchholz (German pronunciation: [ˈbuːxhɔlts]) is a municipality in the district of Schaumburg, in Lower Saxony, Germany.
