= Steinhuder Meerbach =

River in Germany

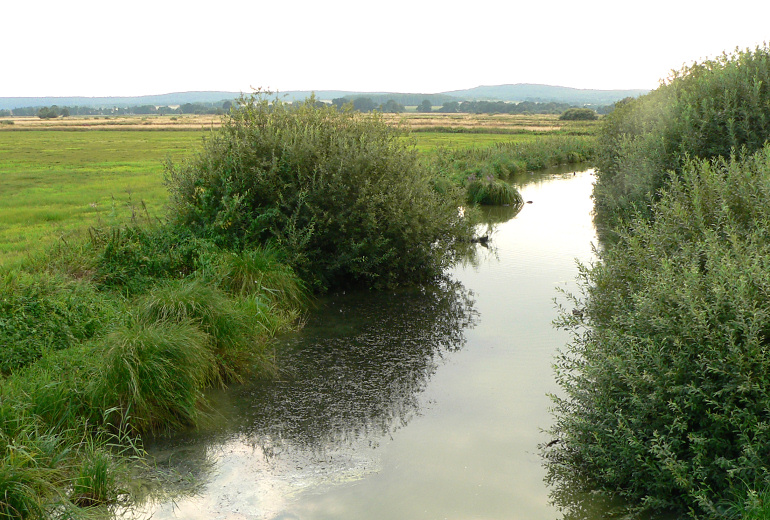
- The Steinhuder Meerbach in the Meerbruch wetland near Lake Steinhude

Location
- Country: Germany
- State: Lower Saxony
- Reference no.: DE: 478

Physical characteristics
- Source
  - location: Steinhuder Meer
  - coordinates: 52°28′10″N 9°16′35″E
- Mouth
  - location: Near Nienburg into the Weser
  - coordinates: 52°38′10″N 9°12′16″E
- Length: 34.4 km (21.4 mi)
- Basin size: 356 km^{2} (137 sq mi)

Basin features
- Progression: Weser→ North Sea
- Landmarks: Large towns: Nienburg; Villages: Rehburg-Loccum, Landesbergen

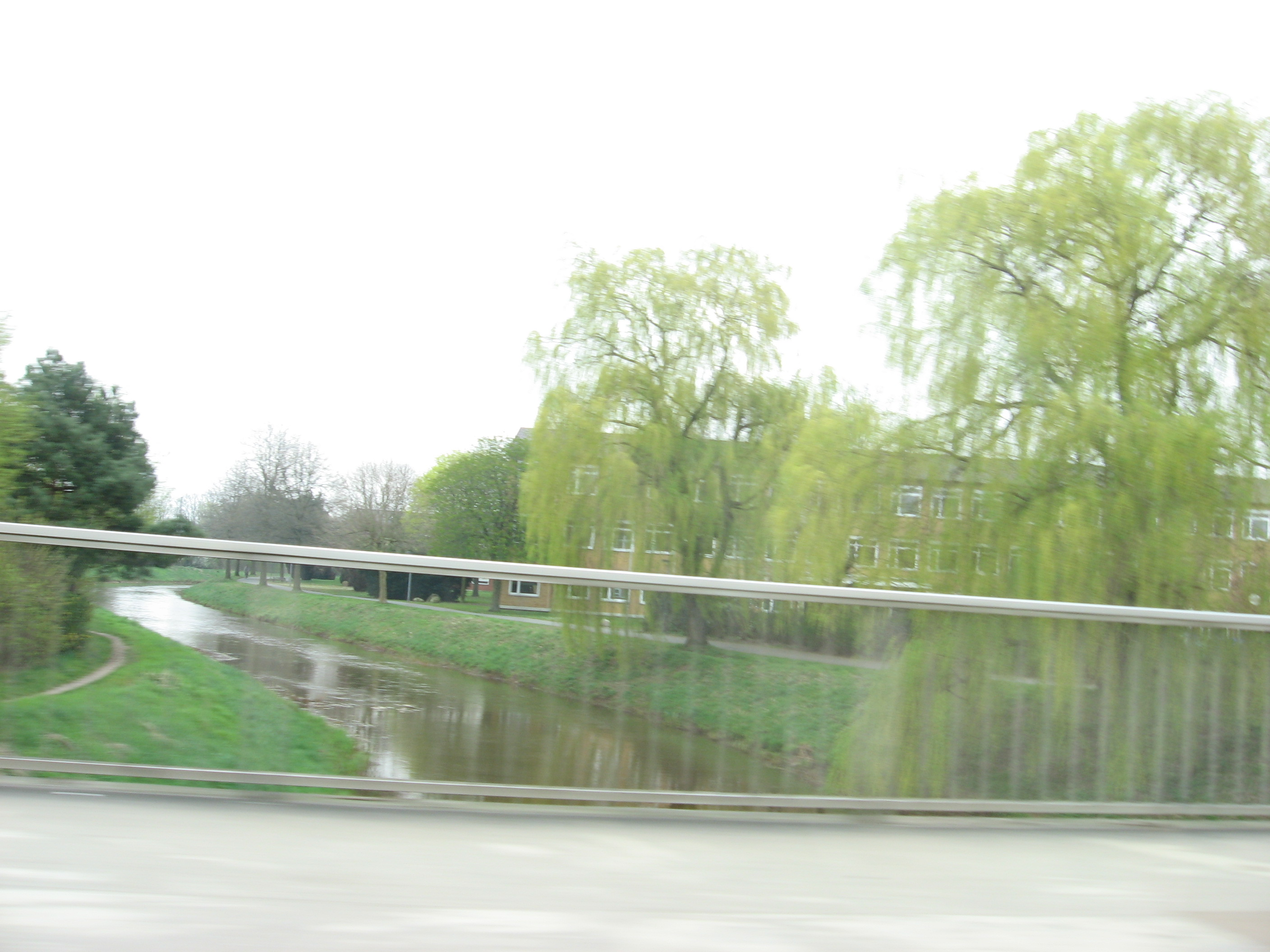
Steinhuder Meerbach in Nienburg

The Steinhuder Meerbach is a 34-kilometre-long (21 mi) orographically right-hand tributary of the River Weser in the German federal state of Lower Saxony.

== Names ==
Some people simply call it Meerbach. Within the town of Nienburg the Meerbach is also commonly known as the Aue, and in the neighbouring villages to the south also as the Bäke.

== Course ==
The Steinhuder Meerbach is the natural tailstream of Lake Steinhude. Its channel flow significantly exceeds the inflow of above-ground headstreams of the lake. It leaves the lake at its northwestern end and then flows west through the Meerbruch nature reserve and the village of Rehburg. It then swings northwards and empties, after 29 kilometres (18 mi), into the Weser at Nienburg.

The Steinhuder Meerbach is canalised along almost its entire length.

At the point where the river bends sharply to the west in Nienburg shortly before its confluence with the Weser the Steinhuder Meerbach used to flow further to the northeast and discharge into the Aller at Rethem. Today the Schipsegraben ditch runs along the old river course.

== See also ==
- List of rivers of Lower Saxony
