= Nenndorf (Samtgemeinde) =

Samtgemeinde in Lower Saxony

- Samtgemeinde
- Location of Nenndorf within Schaumburg district
- Interactive map of Nenndorf
- Location within Germany Location within Lower Saxony
- Coordinates: 52°20′N 09°22′E
- Country: Germany
- State: Lower Saxony
- District: Schaumburg
- Seat: Bad Nenndorf
- Subdivisions: 4 municipalities

Area
  - Total: 51.41 km^{2} (19.85 sq mi)

Population (2025-12-31)
  - Total: 17,999
  - Density: 350.1/km^{2} (906.8/sq mi)
- Time zone: UTC+01:00 (CET)
  - Summer (DST): UTC+02:00 (CEST)
- Website: www.nenndorf.de

Nenndorf is a Samtgemeinde ("collective municipality") in the district of Schaumburg, in Lower Saxony, Germany. Its seat is in the town Bad Nenndorf.

The Samtgemeinde Nenndorf consists of the following municipalities:

1. Bad Nenndorf
2. Haste
3. Hohnhorst
4. Suthfeld

As of 26 May 2024, the collective municipality of Nenndorf had met the legislative quota for the employment of people with disabilities.
