= Niedernwöhren (Samtgemeinde) =

Samtgemeinde in Lower Saxony, Germany

- Samtgemeinde
- Location of Niedernwöhren within Schaumburg district
- Interactive map of Niedernwöhren
- Location within Germany Location within Lower Saxony
- Coordinates: 52°21′N 09°09′E
- Country: Germany
- State: Lower Saxony
- District: Schaumburg
- Seat: Niedernwöhren
- Subdivisions: 6 municipalities

Area
  - Total: 64.38 km^{2} (24.86 sq mi)

Population (2025-12-31)
  - Total: 7,557
  - Density: 117.4/km^{2} (304.0/sq mi)
- Time zone: UTC+01:00 (CET)
  - Summer (DST): UTC+02:00 (CEST)
- Website: www.sg-niedernwoehren.de

Niedernwöhren is a Samtgemeinde ("collective municipality") in the district of Schaumburg, in Lower Saxony, Germany. Its seat is in the village Niedernwöhren.

The Samtgemeinde Niedernwöhren consists of the following municipalities:

1. Lauenhagen
2. Meerbeck
3. Niedernwöhren
4. Nordsehl
5. Pollhagen
6. Wiedensahl
