= Baum Hunting Lodge =

Coordinates: 52°19′48″N 9°03′08″E

- Jagdschloss Baum
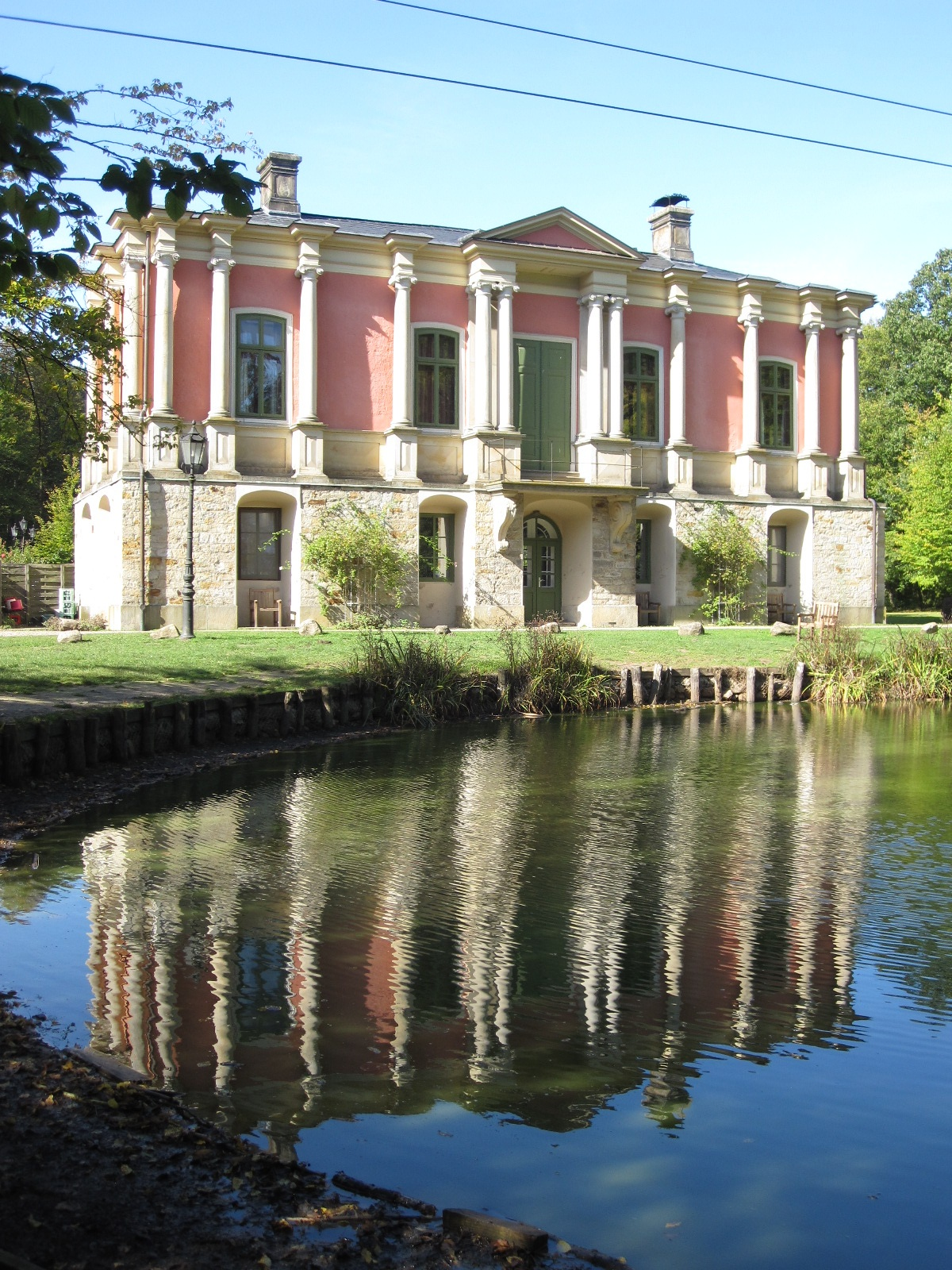
- Jagdschloss Baum from the south

- Location within Lower Saxony Location within Germany

General information
- Type: Schloss
- Architectural style: Late Baroque Classicism
- Location: Bückeburg, Germany
- Construction started: 1760
- Construction stopped: 1761
- Owner: Landeskirche Schaumburg-Lippe

The former Jagdschloss Baum (Baum Hunting Lodge) is a small Schloss near Bückeburg along the road to Lahde in the Schaumburg Forest.

Jagdschloss Baum was built between 1760 and 1761 by Count Wilhelm zu Schaumburg Lippe and is considered a prime example of late Baroque Classicism. An English landscape garden with a small pond adjoins the lodge. Just beyond the pond is a grotto flanked by two portals. These early Baroque portals were installed in 1758 and were probably created between 1604 and 1606 for the Bückeburg Palace's first-floor great hall.

In 1776, Wilhelm zu Schaumburg Lippe built a step pyramid family mausoleum in the park near the lodge. Its entrance consists of an eastern-facing portico portal. Originally, ornamental plants were placed along the pyramid's stepped sides. The mausoleum was situated initially in a hedge garden which was later converted into a wooded park with alleyways.

The lodge owes its name to a tollgate (Schlagbaum) located not far from the border of the small Fürstentum (principality) where the toll was collected.

Today, the hunting lodge serves as the conference and recreation center for the Landeskirche Schaumburg-Lippe's Protestant youth group, Evangelische Jugend, as well as an educational center offering seminars, lectures, and holiday and weekend programs. A dining hall, common room, kitchen, and dormitories in the lodge's upper story are used to accommodate the various functions. An adjacent building, constructed after the hunting lodge, provides additional lodging for up to 40 guests.
