= Rehburg-Loccum =

- Town
- Coat of arms

- Location of Rehburg-Loccum within Nienburg district
- Interactive map of Rehburg-Loccum
- Location within Germany Location within Lower Saxony
- Coordinates: 52°27′3″N 9°12′28″E
- Country: Germany
- State: Lower Saxony
- District: Nienburg
- Subdivisions: 5 districts

Government
  - Mayor (2019–24): Martin Franke (Ind.)

Area
  - Total: 99.97 km^{2} (38.60 sq mi)
- Elevation: 38 m (125 ft)

Population (2025-12-31)
  - Total: 9,851
  - Density: 98.54/km^{2} (255.2/sq mi)
- Time zone: UTC+01:00 (CET)
  - Summer (DST): UTC+02:00 (CEST)
- Postal codes: 31547
- Dialling codes: 05037, 05766 (Loccum)
- Vehicle registration: NI
- Website: www.rehburg-loccum.de

Rehburg-Loccum (German: [ˌʁeːbʊʁk ˈlɔkʊm]) is a town 50 km north west of Hanover in the district of Nienburg in Lower Saxony, Germany.

== Geography ==
=== Geographical location ===
Rehburg-Loccum borders the Steinhude Lake. The closest cities are Wunstorf and Neustadt in the district of Hanover, Petershagen/Weser in the district of Minden-Lübbecke/North Rhine-Westphalia, Landesbergen in the district of Nienburg, and Niedernwöhren and Sachsenhagen in the district of Schaumburg.

=== Division of the town ===
Rehburg-Loccum was founded in 1974 out of the city Rehburg and the neighbouring villages Loccum, Münchehagen, Bad Rehburg, and Winzlar as a consequence of a community restructuring legislation enacted by the federal state government of Lower-Saxony. The Steinhude Lake Nature Reserve spans part of the city area.

== Education ==
The city council runs kindergartens in most parts of the city. There is one primary school each in Münchehagen and Rehburg. A secondary school is located in Loccum. The regional public library can be found in Rehburg.

== Culture ==
A museum was established showing the history of hydrotherapy in the former health resort Bad Rehburg which was used by members of the House of Hanover.

The best-known institution of the city is the Cloister of Loccum (founded in 1163) hosting various classical concerts throughout the year.

The Evangelic Academy of Loccum organises congresses, colloquiums and several workshops about questions and conflicts of politics, culture, sciences and religion and ethics.

Rehburg, Loccum, and Münchehagen have youth clubs.

A social club focussing on customs, costumes, and heritage preservation runs a small local museum about the history of Rehburg. The museum shows historical pictures and exhibits.

The town hall in Rehburg is a popular venue for larger social and cultural events.
