= Nordsehl =

- Municipality
- Location of Nordsehl within Schaumburg district
- Interactive map of Nordsehl
- Location within Germany Location within Lower Saxony
- Coordinates: 52°21′20″N 9°10′56″E
- Country: Germany
- State: Lower Saxony
- District: Schaumburg
- Municipal assoc.: Niedernwöhren

Government
  - Mayor: Hanna Mensching-Buhr

Area
  - Total: 5.97 km^{2} (2.31 sq mi)
- Elevation: 59 m (194 ft)

Population (2025-12-31)
  - Total: 654
  - Density: 110/km^{2} (284/sq mi)
- Time zone: UTC+01:00 (CET)
  - Summer (DST): UTC+02:00 (CEST)
- Postal codes: 31717
- Dialling codes: 05721
- Vehicle registration: SHG
- Website: www.nordsehl-online.de

Nordsehl is a municipality in the district of Schaumburg, in Lower Saxony, Germany.
