= Eilsen (Samtgemeinde) =

Samtgemeinde in Lower Saxony, Germany

- Samtgemeinde
- Location of Eilsen within Schaumburg district
- Interactive map of Eilsen
- Location within Germany Location within Lower Saxony
- Coordinates: 52°14′N 09°06′E
- Country: Germany
- State: Lower Saxony
- District: Schaumburg
- Seat: Bad Eilsen
- Subdivisions: 5 municipalities

Area
  - Total: 13.91 km^{2} (5.37 sq mi)

Population (2025-12-31)
  - Total: 6,791
  - Density: 488.2/km^{2} (1,264/sq mi)
- Time zone: UTC+01:00 (CET)
  - Summer (DST): UTC+02:00 (CEST)
- Website: www.samtgemeinde-eilsen.de

Eilsen is a Samtgemeinde ("collective municipality") in the district of Schaumburg, in Lower Saxony, Germany. Formed in 1974, its seat is in the village Bad Eilsen.

The Samtgemeinde Eilsen consists of the following member municipalities:

1. Ahnsen
2. Bad Eilsen
3. Buchholz
4. Heeßen
5. Luhden
