= Sachsenhagen (Samtgemeinde) =

Samtgemeinde in Lower Saxony, Germany

- Samtgemeinde
- Location of Sachsenhagen within Schaumburg district
- Interactive map of Sachsenhagen
- Location within Germany Location within Lower Saxony
- Coordinates: 52°23′N 09°15′E
- Country: Germany
- State: Lower Saxony
- District: Schaumburg
- Seat: Sachsenhagen
- Subdivisions: 4 municipalities

Area
  - Total: 62.38 km^{2} (24.09 sq mi)

Population (2025-12-31)
  - Total: 9,025
  - Density: 144.7/km^{2} (374.7/sq mi)
- Time zone: UTC+01:00 (CET)
  - Summer (DST): UTC+02:00 (CEST)
- Website: www.sachsenhagen.de

Sachsenhagen is a Samtgemeinde ("collective municipality") in the district of Schaumburg, in Lower Saxony, Germany. Its seat is in the town Sachsenhagen.

The Samtgemeinde Sachsenhagen consists of the following municipalities:

1. Auhagen
2. Hagenburg
3. Sachsenhagen
4. Wölpinghausen
