= Lindhorst (Samtgemeinde) =

Samtgemeinde in Lower Saxony, Germany

- Samtgemeinde
- Location of Lindhorst within Schaumburg district
- Interactive map of Lindhorst
- Location within Germany Location within Lower Saxony
- Coordinates: 52°21′N 09°17′E
- Country: Germany
- State: Lower Saxony
- District: Schaumburg
- Seat: Lindhorst
- Subdivisions: 4 municipalities

Area
  - Total: 34.41 km^{2} (13.29 sq mi)

Population (2025-12-31)
  - Total: 7,624
  - Density: 221.6/km^{2} (573.8/sq mi)
- Time zone: UTC+01:00 (CET)
  - Summer (DST): UTC+02:00 (CEST)
- Website: www.sg-lindhorst.de

Lindhorst is a Samtgemeinde ("collective municipality") in the district of Schaumburg, in Lower Saxony, Germany. Its seat is in the village Lindhorst.

The Samtgemeinde Lindhorst consists of the following municipalities:

1. Beckedorf
2. Heuerßen
3. Lindhorst
4. Lüdersfeld
