= Hespe =

- Municipality
- Location of Hespe within Schaumburg district
- Interactive map of Hespe
- Location within Germany Location within Lower Saxony
- Coordinates: 52°20′1″N 9°6′17″E
- Country: Germany
- State: Lower Saxony
- District: Schaumburg
- Municipal assoc.: Nienstädt

Government
  - Mayor: Werner Vehling (SPD)

Area
  - Total: 6.49 km^{2} (2.51 sq mi)
- Elevation: 53 m (174 ft)

Population (2025-12-31)
  - Total: 2,011
  - Density: 310/km^{2} (803/sq mi)
- Time zone: UTC+01:00 (CET)
  - Summer (DST): UTC+02:00 (CEST)
- Postal codes: 31693
- Dialling codes: 05721, 05722, 05724
- Vehicle registration: SHG

Hespe is a municipality in the district of Schaumburg, in Lower Saxony, Germany.
