= Lindhorst =

- Municipality
- Location of Lindhorst within Schaumburg district
- Interactive map of Lindhorst
- Location within Germany Location within Lower Saxony
- Coordinates: 52°21′31.8″N 9°17′00.2″E
- Country: Germany
- State: Lower Saxony
- District: Schaumburg
- Municipal assoc.: Lindhorst

Government
  - Mayor: Hans-Otto Blume (SPD)

Area
  - Total: 7.88 km^{2} (3.04 sq mi)
- Elevation: 61 m (200 ft)

Population (2025-12-31)
  - Total: 4,228
  - Density: 537/km^{2} (1,390/sq mi)
- Time zone: UTC+01:00 (CET)
  - Summer (DST): UTC+02:00 (CEST)
- Postal codes: 31698
- Dialling codes: 05725
- Vehicle registration: SHG

Lindhorst is a municipality in the district of Schaumburg, in Lower Saxony, Germany. It is situated approximately 8 km northeast of Stadthagen, and 35 km east of Minden.

Lindhorst is also the seat of the Samtgemeinde ("collective municipality") Lindhorst.
