= Seggebruch =

- Municipality
- Location of Seggebruch within Schaumburg district
- Interactive map of Seggebruch
- Location within Germany Location within Lower Saxony
- Coordinates: 52°18′8″N 9°5′39″E
- Country: Germany
- State: Lower Saxony
- District: Schaumburg
- Municipal assoc.: Nienstädt
- Subdivisions: 7

Government
  - Mayor: Herbert Stahlhut (SPD)

Area
  - Total: 7.49 km^{2} (2.89 sq mi)
- Elevation: 59 m (194 ft)

Population (2025-12-31)
  - Total: 1,674
  - Density: 223/km^{2} (579/sq mi)
- Time zone: UTC+01:00 (CET)
  - Summer (DST): UTC+02:00 (CEST)
- Postal codes: 31691
- Dialling codes: 05724
- Vehicle registration: SHG
- Website: www.seggebruch.de

Seggebruch is a municipality in the district of Schaumburg, in Lower Saxony, Germany.
