= Luhden =

- Municipality
- Location of Luhden within Schaumburg district
- Interactive map of Luhden
- Location within Germany Location within Lower Saxony
- Coordinates: 52°13′31″N 9°5′32″E
- Country: Germany
- State: Lower Saxony
- District: Schaumburg
- Municipal assoc.: Eilsen

Government
  - Mayor: Rüdiger Schmidt (CDU)

Area
  - Total: 4.35 km^{2} (1.68 sq mi)
- Elevation: 91 m (299 ft)

Population (2025-12-31)
  - Total: 1,128
  - Density: 259/km^{2} (672/sq mi)
- Time zone: UTC+01:00 (CET)
  - Summer (DST): UTC+02:00 (CEST)
- Postal codes: 31711
- Dialling codes: 05722
- Vehicle registration: SHG
- Website: www.luhden.com

Luhden is a municipality in the district of Schaumburg, in Lower Saxony, Germany.

The first attested reference to Luhden (appearing as Ludhen) is in the records of Obernkirchen Abbey dated 1281.
