= Lüdersfeld =

- Municipality
- Location of Lüdersfeld within Schaumburg district
- Interactive map of Lüdersfeld
- Location within Germany Location within Lower Saxony
- Coordinates: 52°21′30″N 9°15′3″E
- Country: Germany
- State: Lower Saxony
- District: Schaumburg
- Municipal assoc.: Lindhorst

Government
  - Mayor: Heinz Windheim (CDU)

Area
  - Total: 12.64 km^{2} (4.88 sq mi)
- Elevation: 54 m (177 ft)

Population (2025-12-31)
  - Total: 1,067
  - Density: 84.41/km^{2} (218.6/sq mi)
- Time zone: UTC+01:00 (CET)
  - Summer (DST): UTC+02:00 (CEST)
- Postal codes: 31702
- Dialling codes: 05725
- Vehicle registration: SHG

Lüdersfeld is a municipality in the district of Schaumburg, in Lower Saxony, Germany.
