= Nienstädt (Samtgemeinde) =

Samtgemeinde in Lower Saxony, Germany

- Samtgemeinde
- Location of Nienstädt within Schaumburg district
- Interactive map of Nienstädt
- Location within Germany Location within Lower Saxony
- Coordinates: 52°19′N 09°07′E
- Country: Germany
- State: Lower Saxony
- District: Schaumburg
- Seat: Helpsen
- Subdivisions: 4 municipalities

Area
  - Total: 30.06 km^{2} (11.61 sq mi)

Population (2025-12-31)
  - Total: 9,796
  - Density: 325.9/km^{2} (844.0/sq mi)
- Time zone: UTC+01:00 (CET)
  - Summer (DST): UTC+02:00 (CEST)
- Website: www.sg-nienstaedt.de

Nienstädt is a Samtgemeinde ("collective municipality") in the district of Schaumburg, in Lower Saxony, Germany. Its seat is in the village Helpsen.

The Samtgemeinde Nienstädt was formed in 1974, bringing together the following communities:

1. Helpsen
2. Hespe
3. Nienstädt
4. Seggebruch

As of September 2024, the mayor of the Nienstädt collective municipality is Stefan Kolb.
