= Belgiëlei =

Avenue in Antwerp, Belgium

Coordinates: 51.2053°N 4.4175°E

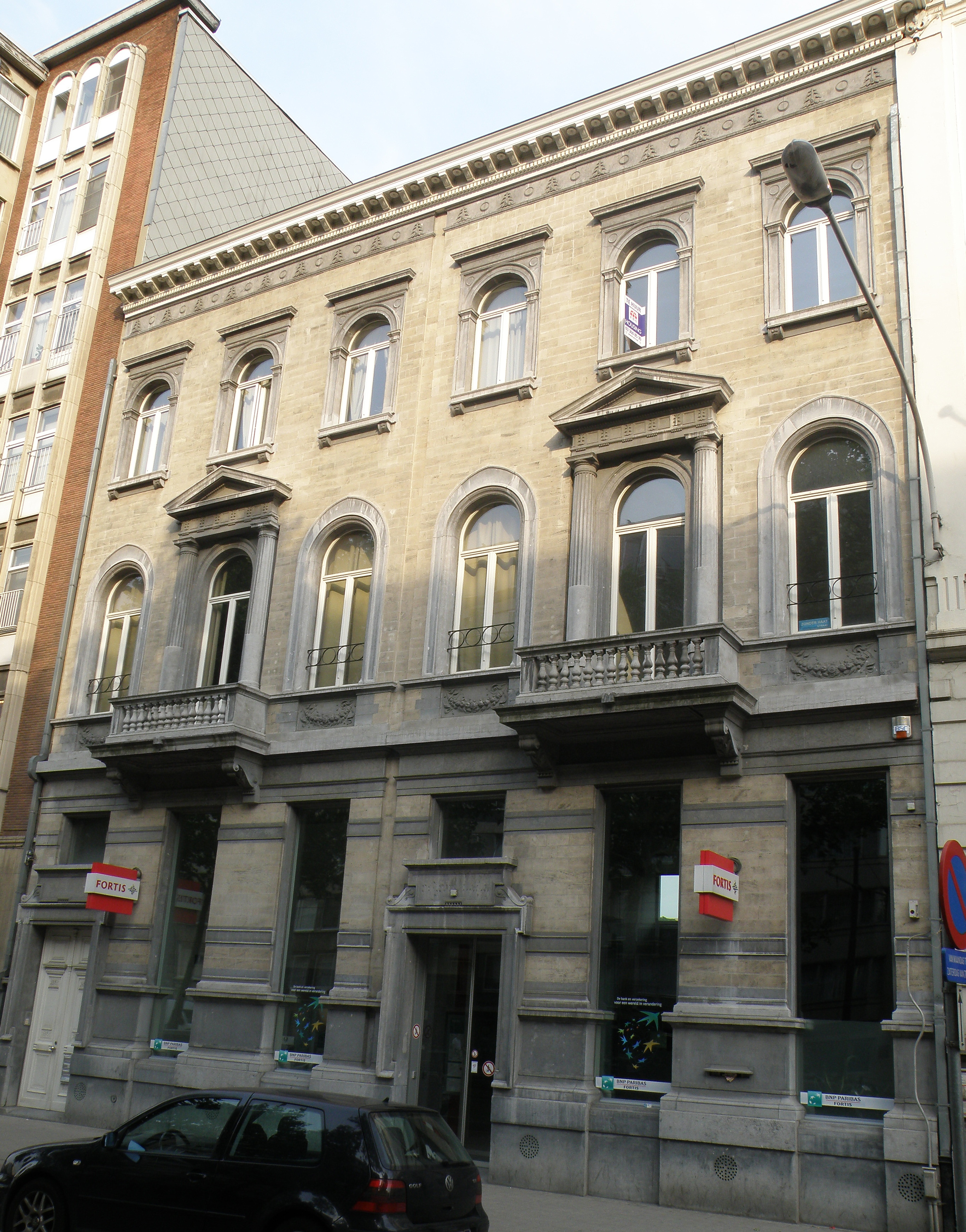
Some buildings on Belgiëlei

Belgiëlei is a broad avenue in the southeast of the Antwerp district in the city of Antwerp in Belgium.

== History ==
It was officially opened in 1859 by Leopold I of Belgium. The avenue created a link between Koning Albertpark and Harmonie Park on one hand and Antwerp Zoo on the other. It also took the traffic that had previously been on the now Lamorinièrestraat en Provinciestraat between Berchem and Borgerhout, two suburbs of Antwerp. In 1919, the avenue was renamed Belgiëlei.

== Belgiëlei today ==
The avenue forms the border between Haringrode and Klein-Antwerpen. It is part of the city's priority cycle network, as well as bus and tram routes.

== Notable buildings on Belgiëlei ==
- Museum Ridder Smidt van Gelder on Belgiëlei 91, a collection of interior and luxury industry from 1650 to 1900, now recognised as a Cultural Heritage Site since 2005 (closed since 1987 following a fire)
- The house of Lieven Gevaert, famous Belgian industrialist
- Several 19th-century and early 20th-century mansions
