= Wiedensahl =

- Municipality
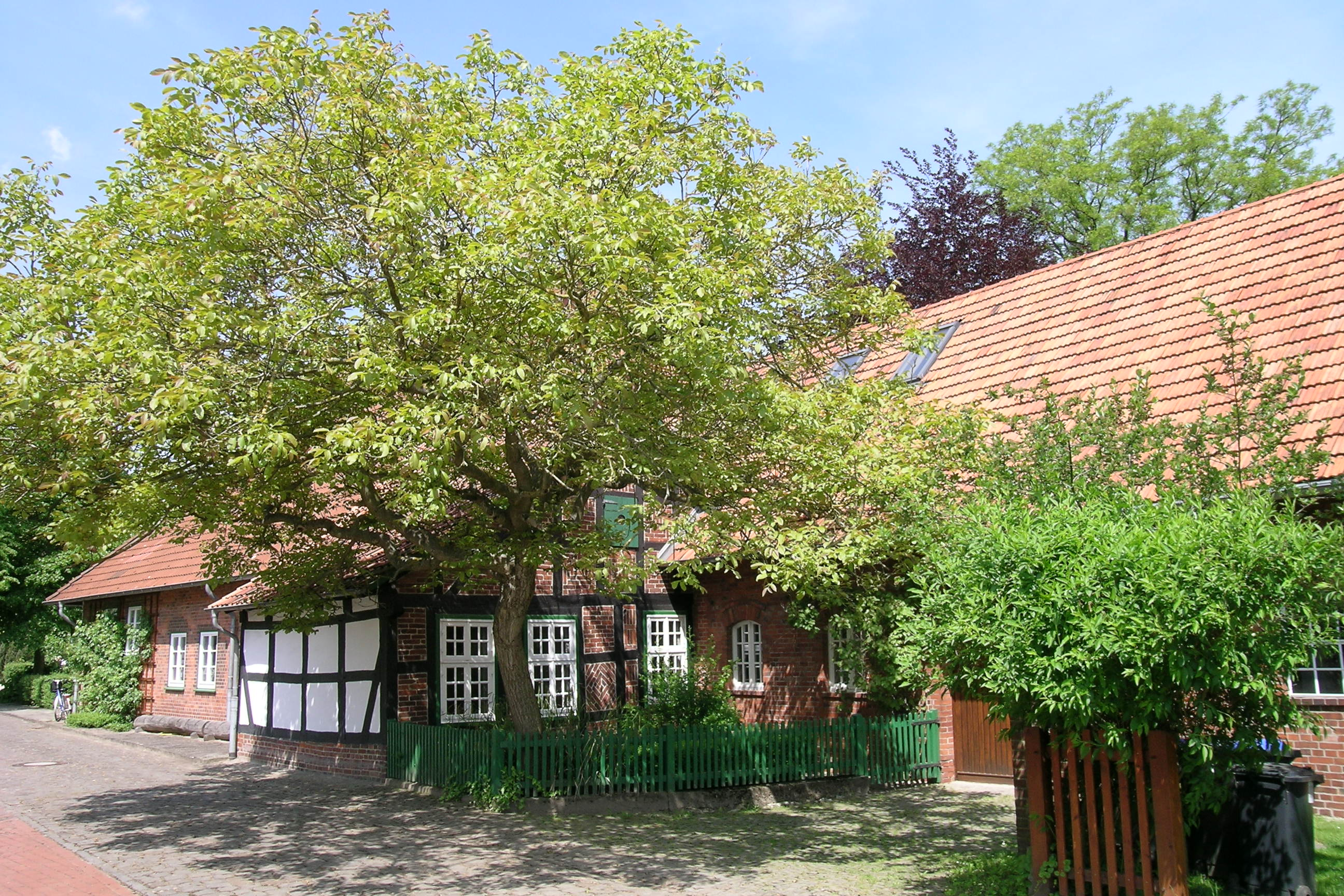
- Birthplace of Wilhelm Busch

- Location of Wiedensahl within Schaumburg district
- Interactive map of Wiedensahl
- Location within Germany Location within Lower Saxony
- Coordinates: 52°22′57″N 9°7′10″E
- Country: Germany
- State: Lower Saxony
- District: Schaumburg
- Municipal assoc.: Niedernwöhren

Government
  - Mayor: Helmut Schaer (SPD)

Area
  - Total: 11.7 km^{2} (4.5 sq mi)
- Elevation: 62 m (203 ft)

Population (2025-12-31)
  - Total: 877
  - Density: 75.0/km^{2} (194/sq mi)
- Time zone: UTC+01:00 (CET)
  - Summer (DST): UTC+02:00 (CEST)
- Postal codes: 31719
- Dialling codes: 05726
- Vehicle registration: SHG
- Website: www.wiedensahl.de

Wiedensahl is a municipality in the district of Schaumburg, in Lower Saxony, Germany.

The caricaturist, painter and poet Wilhelm Busch was born here in 1832.
