= Auhagen =

- Municipality
- Location of Auhagen within Schaumburg district
- Interactive map of Auhagen
- Location within Germany Location within Lower Saxony
- Coordinates: 52°23′52″N 09°17′49″E
- Country: Germany
- State: Lower Saxony
- District: Schaumburg
- Municipal assoc.: Sachsenhagen
- Subdivisions: 2

Government
  - Mayor: Kurt Blume (SPD)

Area
  - Total: 12.36 km^{2} (4.77 sq mi)
- Elevation: 48 m (157 ft)

Population (2025-12-31)
  - Total: 1,271
  - Density: 102.8/km^{2} (266.3/sq mi)
- Time zone: UTC+01:00 (CET)
  - Summer (DST): UTC+02:00 (CEST)
- Postal codes: 31553
- Dialling codes: 05725 (Auhagen) 05033 (Düdinghausen)
- Vehicle registration: SHG

Auhagen is a municipality in the district of Schaumburg, in Lower Saxony, Germany.
