= Lauenhagen =

- Municipality
- Location of Lauenhagen within Schaumburg district
- Interactive map of Lauenhagen
- Location within Germany Location within Lower Saxony
- Coordinates: 52°21′25″N 9°12′33″E
- Country: Germany
- State: Lower Saxony
- District: Schaumburg
- Municipal assoc.: Niedernwöhren
- Subdivisions: 2

Government
  - Mayor: Friedrich Schwier (SPD)

Area
  - Total: 9.73 km^{2} (3.76 sq mi)
- Elevation: 60 m (200 ft)

Population (2025-12-31)
  - Total: 1,263
  - Density: 130/km^{2} (336/sq mi)
- Time zone: UTC+01:00 (CET)
  - Summer (DST): UTC+02:00 (CEST)
- Postal codes: 31714
- Dialling codes: 05721
- Vehicle registration: SHG
- Website: www.lauenhagen.de

Lauenhagen is a municipality in the district of Schaumburg, in Lower Saxony, Germany.
