= Heeßen =

- Municipality
- Location of Heeßen within Schaumburg district
- Interactive map of Heeßen
- Location within Germany Location within Lower Saxony
- Coordinates: 52°14′05″N 9°06′25″E
- Country: Germany
- State: Lower Saxony
- District: Schaumburg
- Municipal assoc.: Eilsen

Government
  - Mayor: Wilhelm Brümmel (CDU)

Area
  - Total: 1.9 km^{2} (0.73 sq mi)
- Elevation: 91 m (299 ft)

Population (2025-12-31)
  - Total: 1,387
  - Density: 730/km^{2} (1,900/sq mi)
- Time zone: UTC+01:00 (CET)
  - Summer (DST): UTC+02:00 (CEST)
- Postal codes: 31707
- Dialling codes: 05722
- Vehicle registration: SHG
- Website: www.heessen-schaumburg.info

Heeßen (German pronunciation: [ˈheːsn̩]) is a municipality in the district of Schaumburg, in Lower Saxony, Germany.
