= Meerbeck =

- Municipality
- Location of Meerbeck within Schaumburg district
- Interactive map of Meerbeck
- Location within Germany Location within Lower Saxony
- Coordinates: 52°20′28″N 9°9′0″E
- Country: Germany
- State: Lower Saxony
- District: Schaumburg
- Municipal assoc.: Niedernwöhren
- Subdivisions: 3

Government
  - Mayor: Klaus Tanski (SPD)

Area
  - Total: 13.09 km^{2} (5.05 sq mi)
- Elevation: 65 m (213 ft)

Population (2025-12-31)
  - Total: 1,824
  - Density: 139.3/km^{2} (360.9/sq mi)
- Time zone: UTC+01:00 (CET)
  - Summer (DST): UTC+02:00 (CEST)
- Postal codes: 31715
- Dialling codes: 05721
- Vehicle registration: SHG
- Website: www.meerbeck.de

Meerbeck (German pronunciation: [ˈmeːɐ̯beːk]) is a municipality in the district of Schaumburg, in Lower Saxony, Germany.
