= Beckedorf =

- Municipality
- Location of Beckedorf within Schaumburg district
- Interactive map of Beckedorf
- Location within Germany Location within Lower Saxony
- Coordinates: 52°20′39″N 9°19′0″E
- Country: Germany
- State: Lower Saxony
- District: Schaumburg
- Municipal assoc.: Lindhorst

Area
  - Total: 9.83 km^{2} (3.80 sq mi)
- Elevation: 60 m (200 ft)

Population (2025-12-31)
  - Total: 1,424
  - Density: 145/km^{2} (375/sq mi)
- Time zone: UTC+01:00 (CET)
  - Summer (DST): UTC+02:00 (CEST)
- Postal codes: 31699
- Dialling codes: 05725
- Vehicle registration: SHG

Beckedorf (German pronunciation: ['beːkədɔʁf]) is a municipality in the district of Schaumburg, in Lower Saxony, Germany.
