= Aue (Weser) =

River in Germany

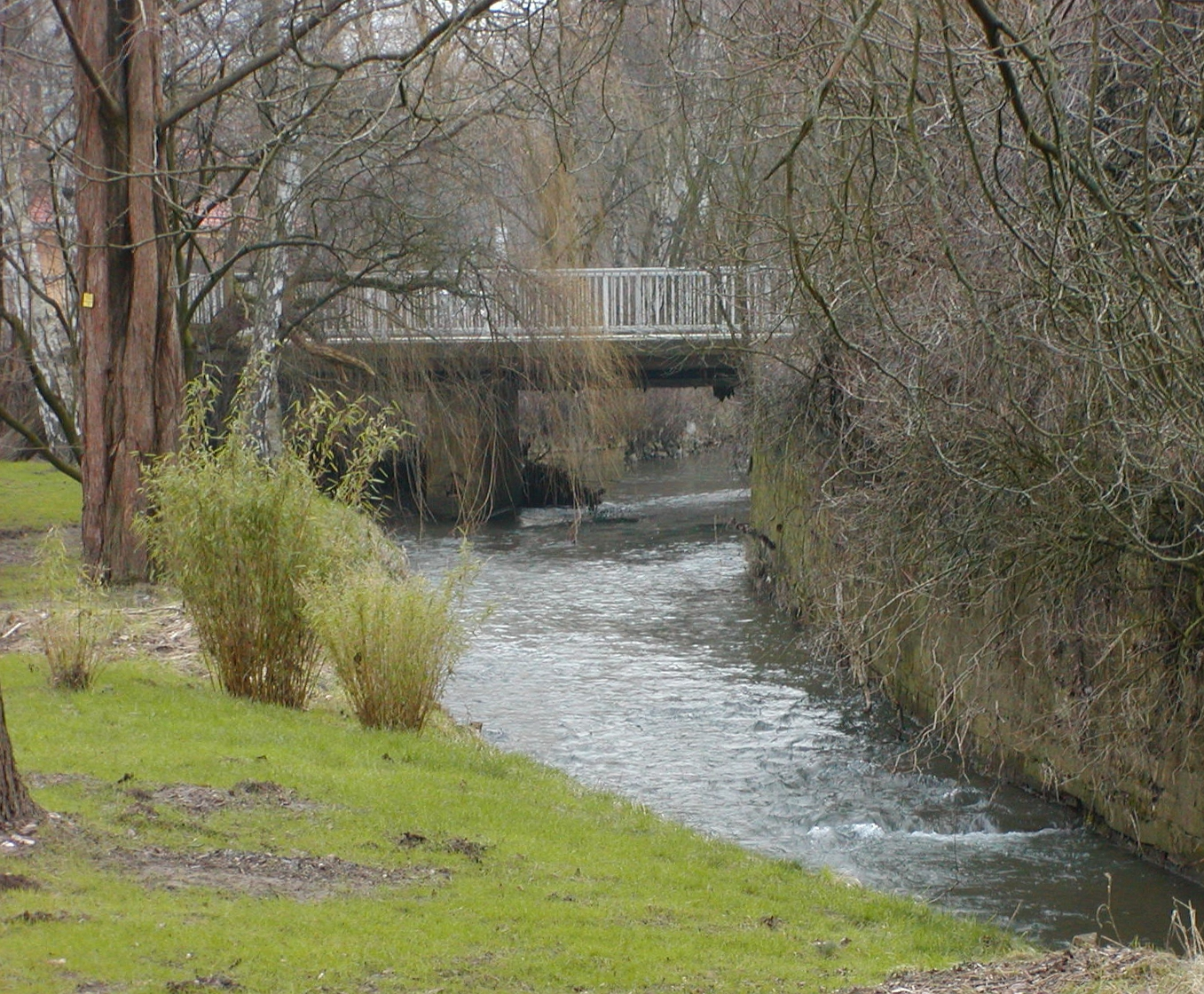

- Location of mouth in Lower Saxony

Location
- Country: Germany
- States: Lower Saxony and North Rhine-Westphalia

Physical characteristics
- Mouth
  - location: Weser
  - coordinates: 52°22′41″N 8°58′34″E
- Length: 38.9 km (24.2 mi)
- Basin size: 173 km^{2} (67 sq mi)

Basin features
- Progression: Weser→ North Sea

The Aue (German pronunciation: [ˈaʊə]), also known as the Bückeburger Aue (German pronunciation: [ˈbʏkəbʊʁɡɐ -]), is an approximately 39 km (24 mi) long, eastern tributary of the river Weser in the Schaumburg District of Lower Saxony, and in the Minden-Lübbecke District of North Rhine-Westphalia. It flows into the Weser near Petershagen.

== See also ==
- List of rivers of Lower Saxony
- List of rivers of North Rhine-Westphalia
