= Saint-Quentin-en-Tourmont =

- Commune
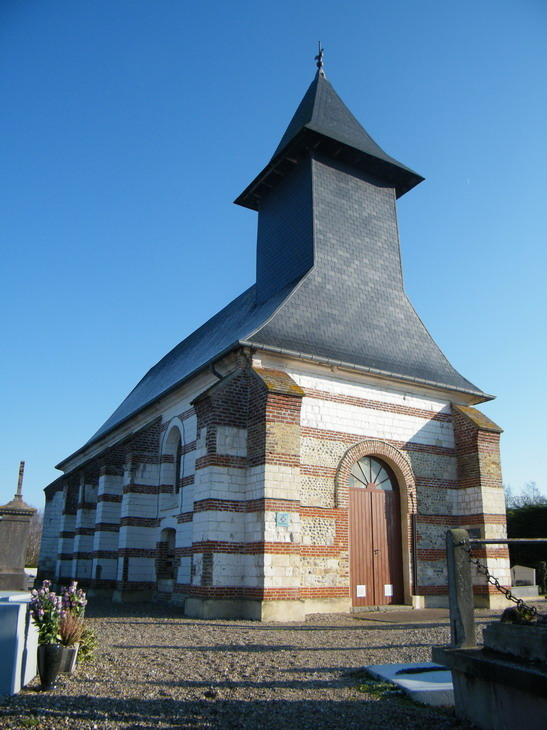
- The church
- Location of Saint-Quentin-en-Tourmont
- Location within France Location within Hauts-de-France
- Coordinates: 50°17′08″N 1°35′25″E
- Country: France
- Region: Hauts-de-France
- Department: Somme
- Arrondissement: Abbeville
- Canton: Rue
- Intercommunality: CC Ponthieu-Marquenterre

Government
  - Mayor (2020–2026): Francis Gouesbier
- Area^{1}: 32.89 km^{2} (12.70 sq mi)
- Elevation: 4 m (13 ft)
- Highest elevation: 36 m (118 ft)
- Lowest elevation: 2 m (6.6 ft)
- Population (2023): 302
  - Density: 9.18/km^{2} (23.8/sq mi)
- Time zone: UTC+01:00 (CET)
  - Summer (DST): UTC+02:00 (CEST)
- INSEE/Postal code: 80713 /80120
- ^{1} French Land Register data, which excludes lakes, ponds, glaciers > 1 km^{2} (0.386 sq mi or 247 acres) and river estuaries.

Saint-Quentin-en-Tourmont (French pronunciation: [sɛ̃ kɑ̃tɛ̃ ɑ̃ tuʁmɔ̃]; Picard: Saint-Quentin-in-Tourmont) is a commune in the Somme department in Hauts-de-France, on the French coast, in northern France.

== Geography ==
The communes is situated some 15 miles (24 km) northwest of Abbeville, on the D204 road, with part of the Marquenterre national park within the commune.

== Population ==
Historical population
Year	Pop.	±% p.a.
1968	307	—
1975	261	−2.29%
1982	296	+1.81%
1990	309	+0.54%
1999	334	+0.87%
2007	309	−0.97%
2012	309	+0.00%
2017	282	−1.81%
2023	302	+1.15%
Source: INSEE

== See also ==
- Communes of the Somme department
