= Bad Nenndorf =

Town in Lower Saxony, Germany

- Town
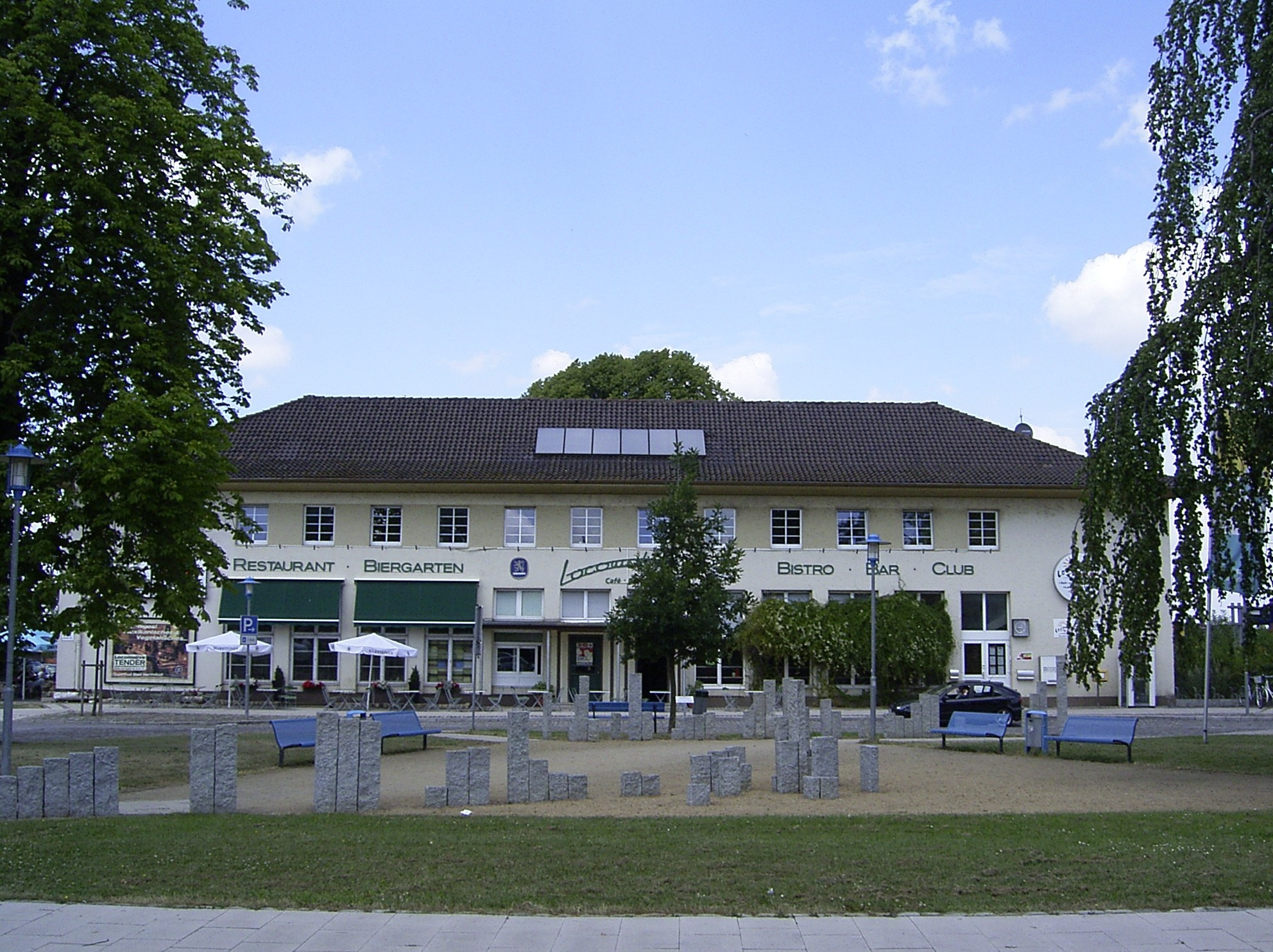
- Train station

- Coat of arms

- Location of Bad Nenndorf within Schaumburg district
- Interactive map of Bad Nenndorf
- Location within Germany Location within Lower Saxony
- Coordinates: 52°20′13″N 09°22′43″E
- Country: Germany
- State: Lower Saxony
- District: Schaumburg
- Municipal assoc.: Nenndorf
- Subdivisions: 4

Government
  - Mayor: Marlies Matthias (CDU)

Area
  - Total: 23.22 km^{2} (8.97 sq mi)
- Elevation: 88 m (289 ft)

Population (2025-12-31)
  - Total: 11,530
  - Density: 496.6/km^{2} (1,286/sq mi)
- Time zone: UTC+01:00 (CET)
  - Summer (DST): UTC+02:00 (CEST)
- Postal codes: 31542
- Dialling codes: 05723
- Vehicle registration: SHG
- Website: www.badnenndorf.de

Bad Nenndorf (German pronunciation: [baːt ˈnɛnˌdɔʁf]; Northern Low Saxon: Nenndörpe) is a small town in the district of Schaumburg, Lower Saxony, Germany. Its population is 10,210 (2005). It is situated approximately 12 km east of Stadthagen, and 25 km west of Hanover, at the southern edge of the North German Plain and the northern edge of the Deister ridge. The area of the town includes the outlying villages of Riepen, Horsten and Waltringhausen.

== History ==
The village, probably dating from the beginning of the 9th century, is first recorded as Nyanthorpe in the records of Corvey Abbey in 936.

The first church was erected in 1136. The village was the property of the Counts of Schaumburg from 1311. Following the establishment of another small settlement to the SW of the village, the distinction was drawn between Gross Nenndorf and Klein Nenndorf. A further settlement by the name of Densinghausen, in the area of the modern town, was destroyed in the Thirty Years' War. After the division of the county of Schaumburg in 1647, Nenndorf belonged to Hesse-Kassel (or Hesse-Cassel).

The healing power of the sulphur springs, situated between Gross Nenndorf and Klein Nenndorf, and first recorded in 1546, was first generally recognised in the mid-18th century. On the initiative of Landgrave Wilhelm IX of Hesse-Kassel, the 'estate district' of Nenndorf, with bathing installations and spa park, was initiated in 1787. The sulphur springs, which until then had been despised as devil's excrement on account of their pungent odour, were reckoned among the most powerful in Europe, and could now finally be applied with great success for rheumatism, arthritis and skin complaints. Soon Nenndorf was one of the leading German spas. In 1866 Bad Nenndorf became the Royal Prussian state spa, and financial support from Berlin enabled it to expand further.

The geographical position of Bad Nenndorf was a major factor in its development. It lies on the northern edge of the Mittelgebirge (central uplands), on the Hellweg, a route between Rhine and Elbe which had been used for centuries. Thus the town obtained connections to the railway network (1847 in Haste and 1872 in Nenndorf), to the Mittellandkanal (1916 in Haste), and to the motorway in 1939.

The community (parish) of Bad Nenndorf was formed in 1929 by the amalgamation of Gross Nenndorf, Klein Nenndorf and the Estate District.

Towards the end of the Second World War, the town served as the headquarters of the U.S. 84th Infantry Division under Major-General Alexander R. Bolling. It subsequently became part of the British Occupation Zone and was the site of a British interrogation camp (1945 to 1947).

The poet Agnes Miegel lived in Bad Nenndorf between 1948 and 1964. The house she lived in (the ‘Agnes-Miegel-Haus’) is now a museum about her life and works.

Bad Nenndorf is also the seat of the Samtgemeinde ("collective municipality") Nenndorf and is twinned with Doudeville, in Normandy.

== Interrogation centre ==
Between June 1945 and July 1947, Bad Nenndorf was the site of a British Combined Services Detailed Interrogation Centre (CSDIC) center through which several hundred Nazi and suspected Communist prisoners passed. The camp became the focus of controversy after allegations of mistreatment of prisoners emerged. One British Army officer was convicted by a court-martial in 1948 for his part in the affair. The controversy surfaced again in December 2005 with the publication of an article in the British newspaper The Guardian In 2006 under Freedom of Information the newspaper reported on the mistreatment of prisoners at the center. Photos were destroyed, but a few remained hidden.

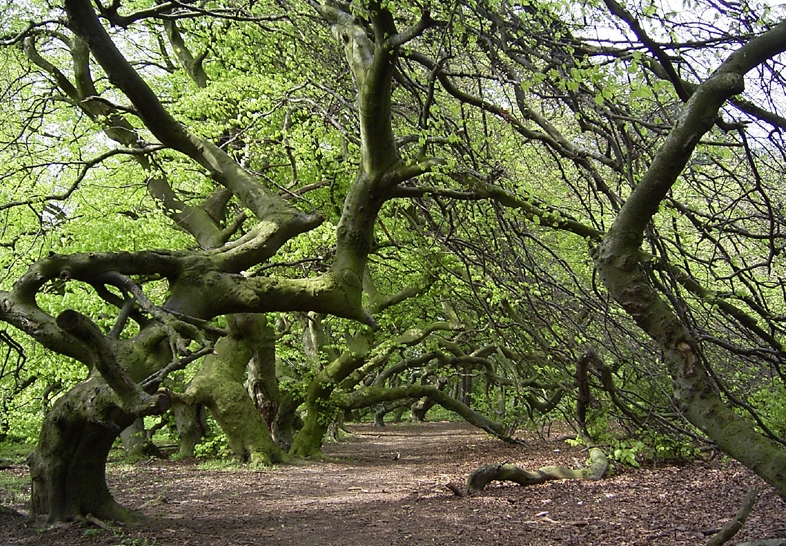
Dwarf beech avenue in Bad Nenndorf

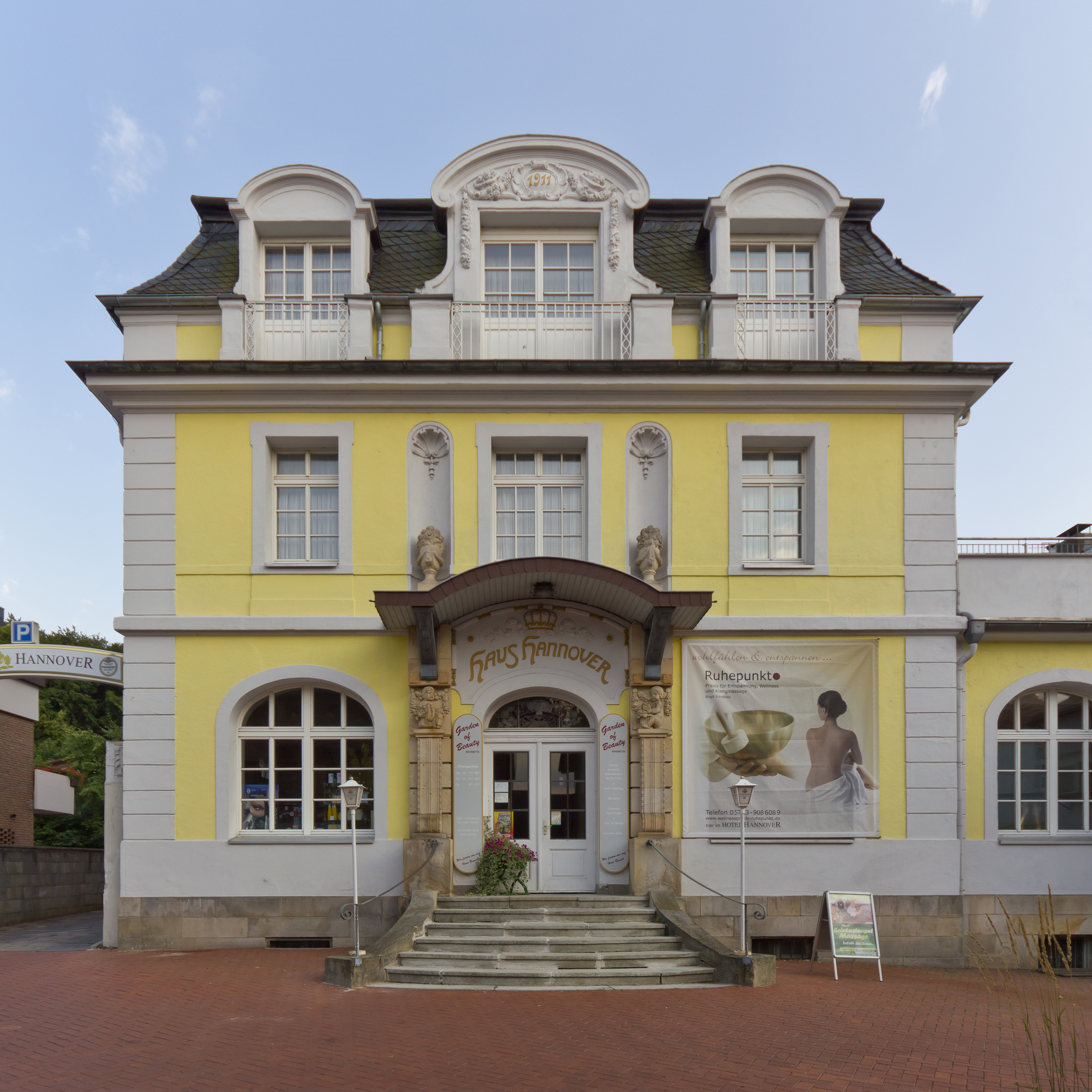
Haus Hanover

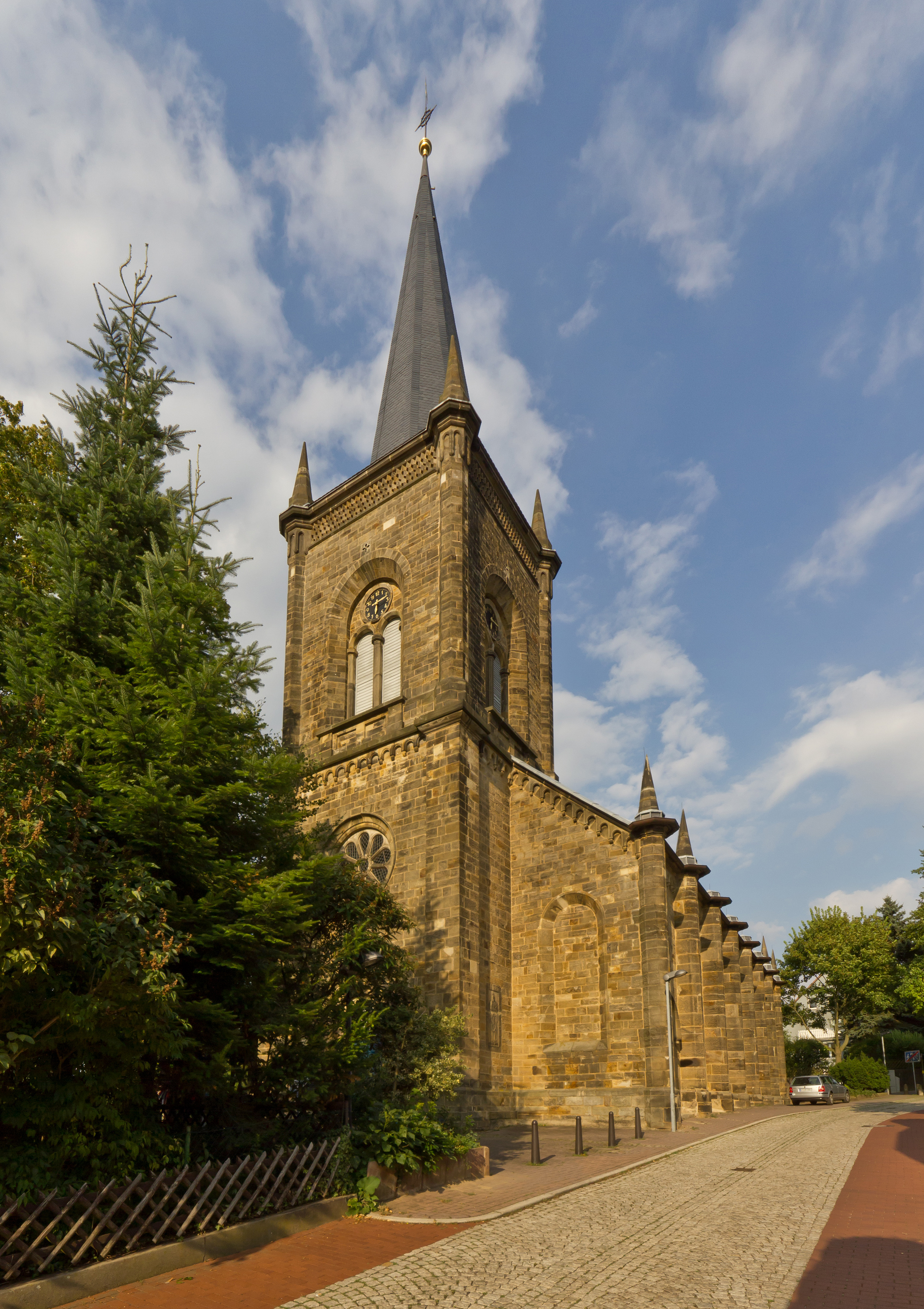
Saint Gotthard Church

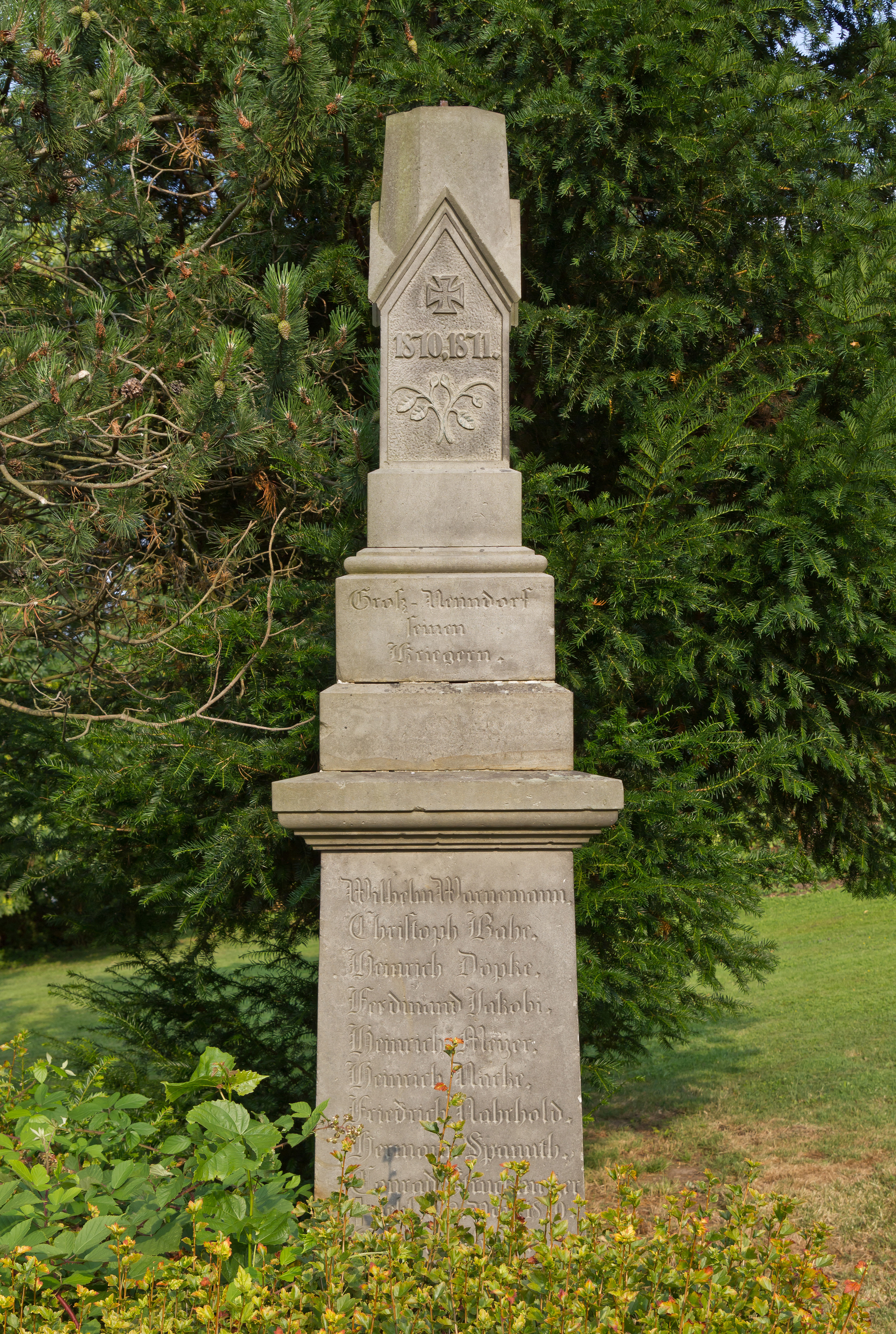
Franco-Prussian War memorial

=== Personality ===
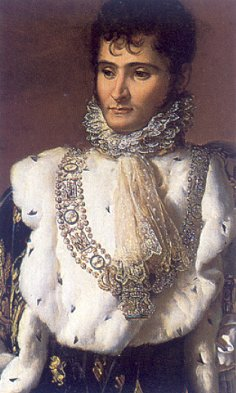
Jerome Bonaparte

- Jérôme Bonaparte (1784-1860), King of Westphalia (1807-1813), stayed during his reign frequently in Bad Nenndorf for a cure. He extended the spa facilities (construction of the mud bath 1809)
- The East Prussian poet Agnes Miegel (1879-1964) lived from 1948 to 1964 in Bad Nenndorf. Her former residence is now home to the Agnes Miegel Society. Since 1954 she is an honorary citizen of the city.
- Dieter Hecking (born 1964), former professional football player and coach of Borussia Mönchengladbach.
