= Shibadaimon =

Shibadaimon 芝大門
- District
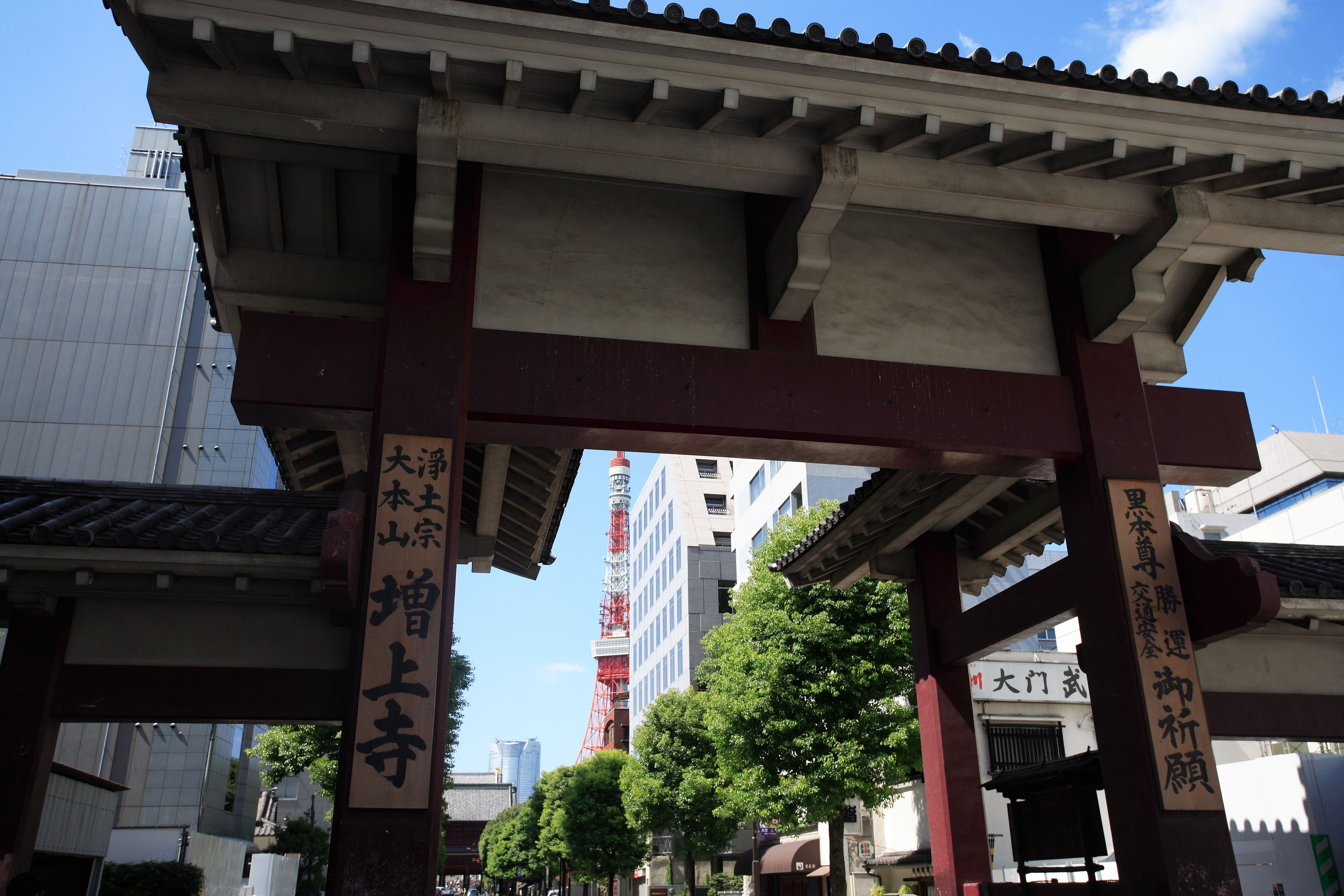
- Zōjō-ji, west of the Shibadaimon intersection

- Location of Shibadaimon within Tokyo Location of Shibadaimon within Tokyo Bay
- Coordinates: 35°39′24.61″N 139°45′16.91″E
- Country: Japan
- Region: Kantō
- Prefecture: Tokyo
- Ward: Minato

Area
  - Total: 0.15 km^{2} (0.058 sq mi)

Population (August 1, 2019)
  - Total: 1,491
- Time zone: UTC+9 (JST)
- Zip code: 105-0012
- Area code: 03

Shibadaimon (芝大門) is a district of Minato, Tokyo, Japan. There are Shibadaimon 1-chome and Shibadaimon 2-chome under the current administrative town names. It is an area under the jurisdiction of the Shiba District General Branch.

== Education ==
Minato City Board of Education operates public elementary and junior high schools.

Shibadaimon 1-2-chōme are zoned to Onarimon Elementary School (御成門小学校) and Onarimon Junior High School (御成門中学校).
