= Pollhagen =

- Municipality
- Location of Pollhagen within Schaumburg district
- Interactive map of Pollhagen
- Location within Germany Location within Lower Saxony
- Coordinates: 52°22′36″N 9°11′17″E
- Country: Germany
- State: Lower Saxony
- District: Schaumburg
- Municipal assoc.: Niedernwöhren

Government
  - Mayor: Gerhard Wischhöfer (SPD)

Area
  - Total: 12.87 km^{2} (4.97 sq mi)
- Elevation: 50 m (160 ft)

Population (2025-12-31)
  - Total: 1,038
  - Density: 80.65/km^{2} (208.9/sq mi)
- Time zone: UTC+01:00 (CET)
  - Summer (DST): UTC+02:00 (CEST)
- Postal codes: 31718
- Dialling codes: 05721
- Vehicle registration: SHG
- Website: www.pollhagen.de

Pollhagen is a municipality in the district of Schaumburg, in Lower Saxony, Germany.
