= Helpsen =

- Municipality
- Location of Helpsen within Schaumburg district
- Interactive map of Helpsen
- Location within Germany Location within Lower Saxony
- Coordinates: 52°18′39″N 09°07′01″E
- Country: Germany
- State: Lower Saxony
- District: Schaumburg
- Municipal assoc.: Nienstädt

Government
  - Mayor: Adolf Neitsch (SPD)

Area
  - Total: 7.77 km^{2} (3.00 sq mi)
- Elevation: 58 m (190 ft)

Population (2025-12-31)
  - Total: 1,882
  - Density: 242/km^{2} (627/sq mi)
- Time zone: UTC+01:00 (CET)
  - Summer (DST): UTC+02:00 (CEST)
- Postal codes: 31691
- Dialling codes: 05724
- Vehicle registration: SHG
- Website: www.helpsen.de

Helpsen is a municipality in the district of Schaumburg, in Lower Saxony, Germany.
