= Heuerßen =

- Municipality
- Location of Heuerßen within Schaumburg district
- Interactive map of Heuerßen
- Location within Germany Location within Lower Saxony
- Coordinates: 52°19′46″N 09°16′43″E
- Country: Germany
- State: Lower Saxony
- District: Schaumburg
- Municipal assoc.: Lindhorst

Area
  - Total: 3.97 km^{2} (1.53 sq mi)
- Elevation: 144 m (472 ft)

Population (2025-12-31)
  - Total: 905
  - Density: 228/km^{2} (590/sq mi)
- Time zone: UTC+01:00 (CET)
  - Summer (DST): UTC+02:00 (CEST)
- Postal codes: 31700
- Dialling codes: 05725
- Vehicle registration: SHG

Heuerßen is a municipality in the district of Schaumburg, in Lower Saxony, Germany.
