= Wölpinghausen =

- Municipality
- Coat of arms

- Location of Wölpinghausen within Schaumburg district
- Interactive map of Wölpinghausen
- Location within Germany Location within Lower Saxony
- Coordinates: 52°25′15″N 9°14′17″E
- Country: Germany
- State: Lower Saxony
- District: Schaumburg
- Municipal assoc.: Sachsenhagen
- Subdivisions: 3

Government
  - Mayor: Joachim Schwidlinski (SPD)

Area
  - Total: 18.33 km^{2} (7.08 sq mi)
- Elevation: 95 m (312 ft)

Population (2025-12-31)
  - Total: 1,522
  - Density: 83.03/km^{2} (215.1/sq mi)
- Time zone: UTC+01:00 (CET)
  - Summer (DST): UTC+02:00 (CEST)
- Postal codes: 31556
- Dialling codes: 05037
- Vehicle registration: SHG
- Website: www.woelpinghausen.de

Wölpinghausen is a municipality in the district of Schaumburg, in Lower Saxony, Germany.
