= Niedernwöhren =

- Municipality
- Location of Niedernwöhren within Schaumburg district
- Interactive map of Niedernwöhren
- Location within Germany Location within Lower Saxony
- Coordinates: 52°21′7″N 9°8′55″E
- Country: Germany
- State: Lower Saxony
- District: Schaumburg
- Municipal assoc.: Niedernwöhren

Government
  - Mayor: Klaus Seehausen (SPD)

Area
  - Total: 11.06 km^{2} (4.27 sq mi)
- Elevation: 63 m (207 ft)

Population (2025-12-31)
  - Total: 1,901
  - Density: 171.9/km^{2} (445.2/sq mi)
- Time zone: UTC+01:00 (CET)
  - Summer (DST): UTC+02:00 (CEST)
- Postal codes: 31712
- Dialling codes: 05721, 05726
- Vehicle registration: SHG
- Website: www.niedernwoehren.de

Niedernwöhren is a municipality in the district of Schaumburg, in Lower Saxony, Germany. It is situated approximately 5 kilometres (3.1 mi) northwest of Stadthagen and 17 kilometres (11 mi) northeast of Minden.

Niedernwöhren is the seat of the Samtgemeinde ("collective municipality") Niedernwöhren.
