= Sachsenhagen =

- Town
- Location of Sachsenhagen within Schaumburg district
- Interactive map of Sachsenhagen
- Location within Germany Location within Lower Saxony
- Coordinates: 52°24′N 9°16′E
- Country: Germany
- State: Lower Saxony
- District: Schaumburg
- Municipal assoc.: Sachsenhagen
- Subdivisions: 2

Government
  - Mayor: Herwig Henke (SPD)

Area
  - Total: 15.29 km^{2} (5.90 sq mi)
- Elevation: 55 m (180 ft)

Population (2025-12-31)
  - Total: 1,819
  - Density: 119.0/km^{2} (308.1/sq mi)
- Time zone: UTC+01:00 (CET)
  - Summer (DST): UTC+02:00 (CEST)
- Postal codes: 31553
- Dialling codes: 05725
- Vehicle registration: SHG
- Website: www.sachsenhagen.de

Sachsenhagen (German pronunciation: [zaksn̩ˈhaːɡn̩]) is a town in the district of Schaumburg, in Lower Saxony, Germany. It is situated approximately 9 km northeast of Stadthagen, and 33 km west of Hanover.

Sachsenhagen is also the seat of the Samtgemeinde ("collective municipality") Sachsenhagen.
