= Ahnsen =

- Municipality
- Location of Ahnsen within Schaumburg district
- Interactive map of Ahnsen
- Location within Germany Location within Lower Saxony
- Coordinates: 52°15′27″N 9°5′43″E
- Country: Germany
- State: Lower Saxony
- District: Schaumburg
- Municipal assoc.: Eilsen

Government
  - Mayor: Heinz Grabbe (SPD)

Area
  - Total: 3.43 km^{2} (1.32 sq mi)
- Elevation: 88 m (289 ft)

Population (2025-12-31)
  - Total: 1,027
  - Density: 299/km^{2} (775/sq mi)
- Time zone: UTC+01:00 (CET)
  - Summer (DST): UTC+02:00 (CEST)
- Postal codes: 31708
- Dialling codes: 05722
- Vehicle registration: SHG

Ahnsen is a municipality in the district of Schaumburg, in Lower Saxony, Germany.
