= Bad Eilsen =

- Municipality
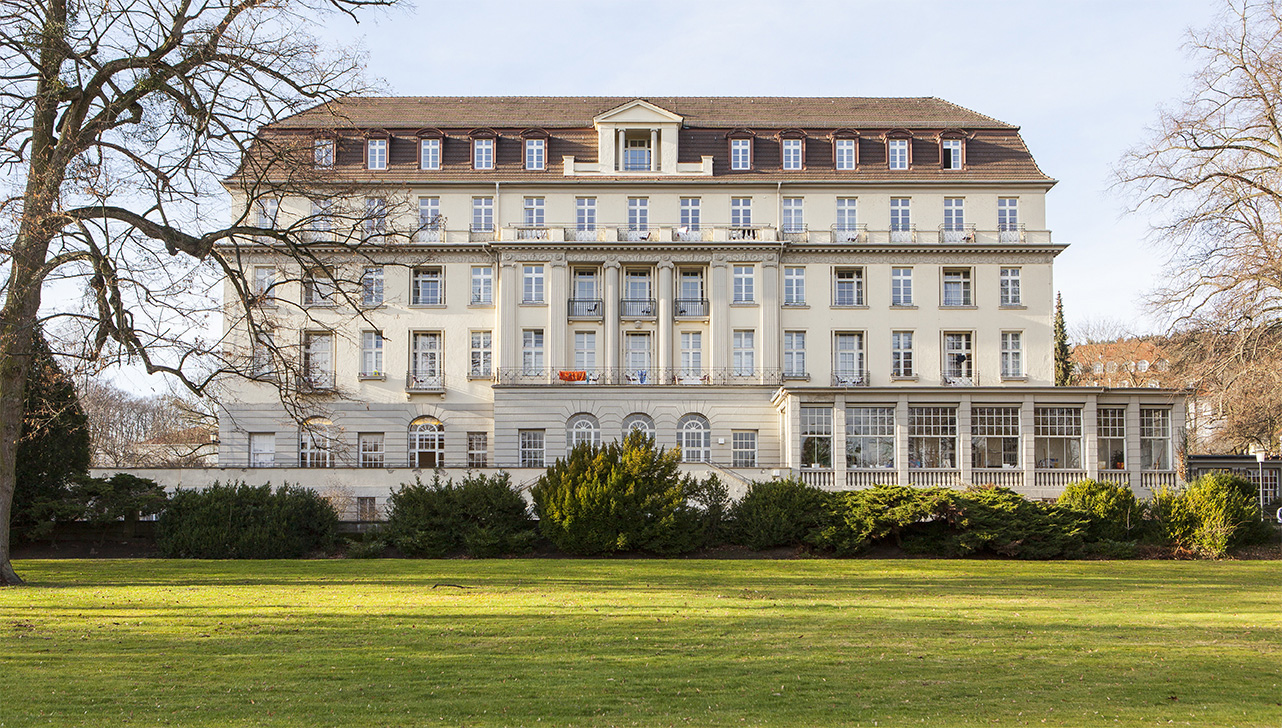
- Prince's House in the spa park

- Coat of arms

- Location of Bad Eilsen within Schaumburg district
- Interactive map of Bad Eilsen
- Location within Germany Location within Lower Saxony
- Coordinates: 52°14′35″N 9°5′58″E
- Country: Germany
- State: Lower Saxony
- District: Schaumburg
- Municipal assoc.: Eilsen

Government
  - Mayor: Christel Bergmann (SPD)

Area
  - Total: 2.46 km^{2} (0.95 sq mi)
- Elevation: 133 m (436 ft)

Population (2025-12-31)
  - Total: 2,537
  - Density: 1,030/km^{2} (2,670/sq mi)
- Time zone: UTC+01:00 (CET)
  - Summer (DST): UTC+02:00 (CEST)
- Postal codes: 31707
- Dialling codes: 05722
- Vehicle registration: SHG
- Website: www.bad-eilsen.de

Bad Eilsen (West Low German: Ahlsen) is a municipality in the district of Schaumburg, in Lower Saxony, Germany. It is situated approximately 11 km (6.8 mi) southwest of Stadthagen, and 13 km (8.1 mi) southeast of Minden.

Bad Eilsen is also the seat of the Samtgemeinde ("collective municipality") Eilsen.

== History ==
After World War II, Bad Eilsen was in the British Zone of Occupation. The British Air Force of Occupation (BAFO) was founded on 15 July 1945 and its headquarters were in Bad Eilsen until JHQ Rheindahlen was opened in 1954. The HQ was served by the airfield at RAF Bückeburg (now Bückeburg Air Base), which also served the nearby HQ of the British Army of the Rhine in Bad Oeynhausen.
