= Schaumburg =

District in Lower Saxony, Germany

Coordinates: 52°15′N 9°10′E

Landkreis Schaumburg
- District
- Flag Coat of arms
- Country: Germany
- State: Lower Saxony
- Capital: Stadthagen

Government
  - District admin.: Jörg Farr (SPD)

Area
  - Total: 676 km^{2} (261 sq mi)

Population (31 December 2023)
  - Total: 157,051
  - Density: 230/km^{2} (600/sq mi)
- Time zone: UTC+01:00 (CET)
  - Summer (DST): UTC+02:00 (CEST)
- Vehicle registration: SHG, RI
- Website: landkreis-schaumburg.de

Schaumburg (German pronunciation: [ˈʃaʊmˌbʊʁk]) is a district (Landkreis) of Lower Saxony, Germany. It is bounded by (clockwise from the north) the districts of Nienburg, Hanover and Hameln-Pyrmont, and the state of North Rhine-Westphalia (districts of Lippe and Minden-Lübbecke).

== History ==
Landkreis Schaumburg was created on August 1, 1977 within the framework of the Kreisreform (district reform) of Lower Saxony by combining the former districts of Schaumburg-Lippe and Grafschaft Schaumburg. The town of Hessisch Oldendorf was reallocated to Landkreis Hameln-Pyrmont. The communities of Großenheidorn, Idensermoor-Niengraben and Steinhude had already been allocated to the community of Wunsdorf and thereby became part of Landkreis Hanover.

The Landkreis Schaumburg essentially duplicates the borders of Schaumburg at the time of the Middle Ages. Schaumburg was a medieval county, which was founded at the beginning of the 12th century. Shortly after, the Holy Roman Emperor appointed the counts of Schaumburg to become counts of Holstein as well.

During the Thirty Years' War the House of Schaumburg had no male heir, and the county was divided into Schaumburg (which became part of Hesse-Kassel) and the County of Schaumburg-Lippe (1640). As a member of the Confederation of the Rhine, Schaumburg-Lippe raised itself to a principality. In 1815, Schaumburg-Lippe joined the German Confederation, and in 1871 the German Empire. In 1918, it became a republic. The tiny Free State of Schaumburg-Lippe existed until 1946, when it became an administrative area within Lower Saxony. Schaumburg-Lippe had an area of 340 km², and a population of 51,000 (as of 1934).

Hessian Schaumburg was annexed to Prussia along with the rest of Hesse-Kassel in 1866. After World War II, Schaumburg and Schaumburg-Lippe became districts within the state of Lower Saxony, until they were merged again in 1977.

== Geography ==
The district (Landkreis) of Schaumburg has its northern half located in the North German Plain and the southern half in the Weser Uplands (Weserbergland). The Weser Uplands consist of hilly ridges and include the Wesergebirge, Harrl, Süntel, Bückeberg and Deister. The Schaumburg Forest is a continuous strip of woods running in a direction of approximately 60 degrees along the northern border of the district. Just beyond the northern border of the district is Lake Steinhude a 29,1 km^{2} shallow lake that is the largest in Northern Germany. The river Weser flows westward along the south of the Wiehengebirge through a broad valley and the town of Rinteln. The landscape is bordered to the west by the River Weser which is in the neighbouring district of Minden-Lübbecke. It flows north through the Westphalian Gap towards the city of Bremen and the North Sea. In the flat North German Plain to the east of Schaumburg district lies Hanover, the capital city of Lower Saxony.

== Coat of arms ==
The coat of arms is almost identical to the old arms of Schaumburg, which had been used since the 12th century. Schaumburg Castle, in mediaeval times the seat of the Counts of Schaumburg, is located on the Nesselberg ("nettle mountain") in Schaumburg, a locality in the town of Rinteln. The nettle leaf in the middle of the arms has become the heraldic symbol of Holstein, symbolising the historical connection between Holstein and Schaumburg.

== Towns and municipalities ==
Clickable map of towns and municipalities in the district

Towns

Town	Capital	Area(km²)	Population (2015)	Location
Auetal	Rehren	62,16 km²	6.315	
Obernkirchen	Obernkirchen	32,48 km²	9.196	
Rinteln	Rinteln	109,06 km²	25.187	
Bückeburg	Bückeburg	68,84 km²	19.182	
Stadthagen	Stadthagen	60,27 km²	21.814	

Samtgemeinden (collective municipalities) with their member municipalities

Samtgemeinde	Member municipalities	Capital	Area (km²)	Population(2015)	Location
Rodenberg	List: Apelern; Rodenberg; Hülsede; lauenau; Messenkamp; Pohle	Rodenberg	86,2 km²	15.562	
Nenndorf	List: Hohnhorst; Haste; Suthfeld; Bad Nenndorf	Bad Nenndorf	51,4 km²	16.960	
Eilsen	List: Bad Eilsen; Ahnsen; Buchholz; Heeßen; Luhden	Bad Eilsen	13,91 km²	6.715	
Niedernwöhren	List: Niedernwöhren; Meerbeck; Lauenhagen; Nordsehl; Pollhagen; Wiedensahl	Niedernwöhren	64,42 km²	8.115	
Sachsenhagen	List: Sachsenhagen; Auhagen; Hagenburg; Wölpinghausen	Sachsenhagen	62,44 km²	9.253	
Nienstädt	List: Nienstädt; Seggebruch; Helpsen; Hespe	Nienstädt	30,06 km²	10.111	
Lindhorst	List: Lindhorst; Heuerßen; Lüdersfeld; Beckedorf	Lindhorst	34,34 km²	7.796	

== See also ==
- Metropolitan region Hannover-Braunschweig-Göttingen-Wolfsburg
- Schaumburg, Illinois
