= Osterwald (hills) =

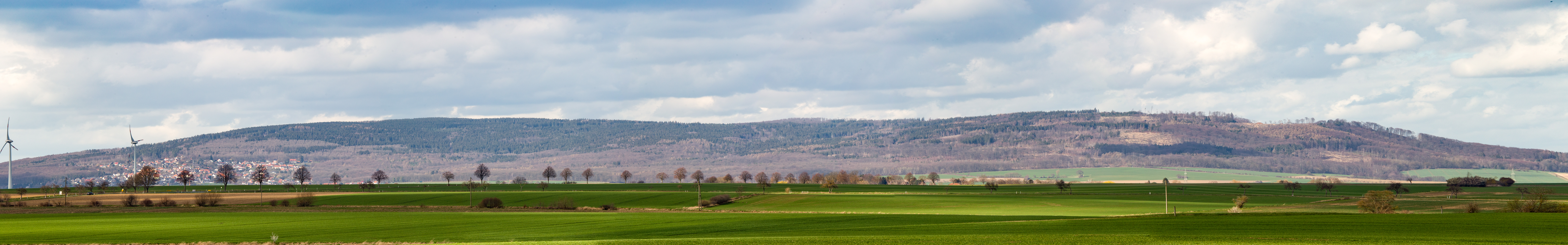
- A panoramic of the Osterwald hills

Highest point
- Peak: Fast
- Elevation: 419.2 m above NN

Geography
- Location within Lower Saxony
- Country: Germany
- State: Lower Saxony
- Range coordinates: 52°08′00″N 9°38′00″E
- Parent range: Calenberg Uplands

The Osterwald is a ridge (up to 419.2 m above sea level (NN)) in the Calenberg Uplands and together with the Nesselberg and the Kleiner Deister forms a unified group of three adjacent ranges in the Leine Uplands. It lies between Coppenbrügge, Eldagsen and Elze in the North German state of Lower Saxony.

== Geography ==
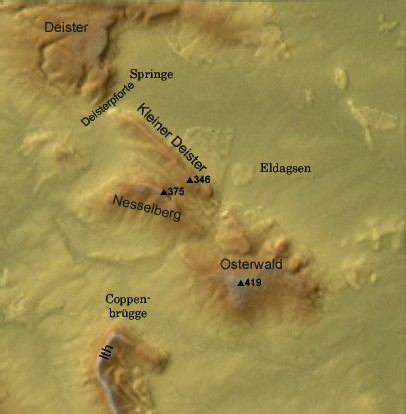
Kleiner Deister, Nesselberg and Osterwald

The Osterwald is located in the Calenberg Uplands north of the Leine Uplands that border on the Calenberg Land there. It lies about halfway between Hamelin in the west and Hildesheim in the east and between the villages of Coppenbrügge in the southwest and Eldagsen in the north and Elze in the east. In terms of natural regions it belongs to the Lower Saxon Hills and borders on the Calenberg Loess Börde in the north and east. The districts of Hildesheim and Hameln-Pyrmont and the region of Hanover meet near the Triangular Rock (Dreieckiger Stein) not far from the Shepherd's Hut (Sennhütte).

On the southern rim of the Osterwald is the eponymous village of Osterwald in the municipality of Salzhemmendorf. The Osterwald spreads southeast of the valley of the Gehlenbach and Gelbbach streams, through which the state road (the Landesstraße 422) runs from Coppenbrügge in the southwest to Eldagsen. Immediately north-northwest of this valley is the hill of Nesselberg. On the other, southern, side of Coppenbrügge is the knife-edge ridge of the Ith.

== Hydrography ==
Numerous streams rise in the Osterwald, their waters flowing through the Haller and the Saale into the Leine. The only exception is a stream that starts west of the Fast and passes through the Gelbbach and the Hamel into the River Weser.

== Places of interest ==
=== Monastery ===
On the eastern side of the Osterwald, behind the large, former monastic estate, lies Wülfinghausen Abbey, founded in the 12th century. The present abbey buildings only date to the beginning of the 18th century, however, thanks to several major fires. Since 1994 it has been occupied by a Protestant community of seven sisters.

=== Hillfort ===
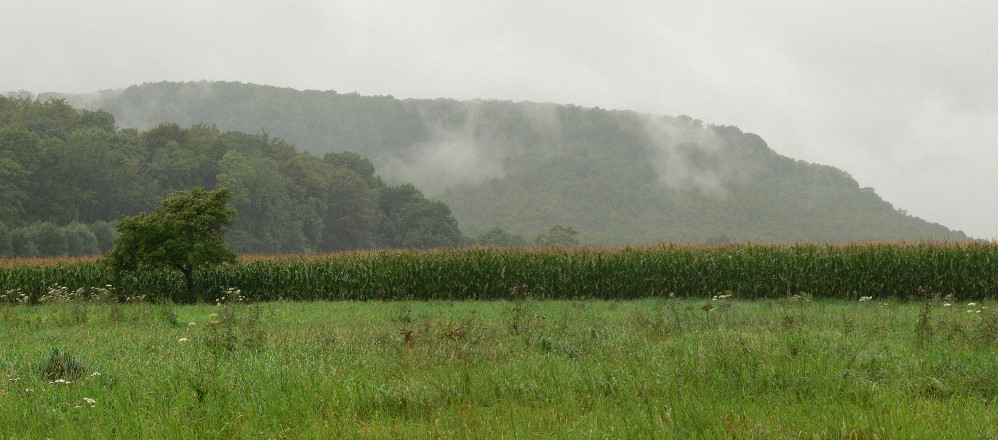
Hill spur with the ruins of the Barenburg, seen from Wülfinghausen Abbey

About 1 kilometre west of Wülfinghausen Abbey on a spur-shaped foothill of the Osterwald is the ruined castle of Barenburg. This was a hillfort site with an internal area of 5.5 hectares. The site is located in a strategically favourable position, because two sides are naturally protected by steep, rock faces and slopes. To the south security is provided by a roughly 300 metre long stone rampart with an outer rampart and protective ditches. Because no excavations have been carried out to date and there are no known finds, the construction period of the site has only been estimated as being in the pre-Roman Iron Age. It could have been used as a refuge castle until the Middle Ages, because it was part of the estate of the monastery.

=== Mining ===
Up to the mid-20th century sandstone, limestone and coal were mined in the Osterwald. Coal mining had a more-than-400-year-old tradition. The first prospecting for coal was carried out in 1585 by order of Duke Julius of Brunswick. Today the Hüttenstollen Osterwald is a visitor mine and museum.

In the Osterwald a Wealden Sandstone known as Osterwald Sandstone was broken and used extensively in the region as well as in the area of Hanover in the Gründerzeit period.

== Hills ==
The hills and elevations of the Osterwald include the following − with heights in metres above sea level (NN):

- Fast (419.2 m)
- Hoher Stuhl, 391.0 m
- Ahrensberg, ca. 365 m
- Ritterkreuz, ca. 360 m
- Hohlenberg, 358.0 m
- Hainholz, 298.0 m
- Großer Rotehengst, 268.1 m
- Limberg, 182.0 m
- Kendelke, 141 m

== Villages near the Osterwald ==
- Coppenbrügge
- Dörpe
- Ikenburg
- Salzburg (with forester's lodge)
- Osterwald (Salzhemmendorf)
- Mehle
- Oldendorf (Salzhemmendorf) with its hamlet of "Glashütte"
- Sorsum
- Wittenburg (with forester's lodge)
- Klostergut Wülfinghausen
- Farrensen (with forester's lodge)
- Holtensen
