= Hameln-Pyrmont – Holzminden =

Federal electoral district of Germany

46 Hameln-Pyrmont – Holzminden
- Electoral district for the Bundestag
- Hameln-Pyrmont – Holzminden in 2025
- State: Lower Saxony
- Population: 236,200 (2019)
- Electorate: 184,471 (2021)
- Major settlements: Hameln; Holzminden; Bad Pyrmont
- Area: 1,802.4 km^{2}

Current electoral district
- Created: 1949
- Party: SPD
- Member: Johannes Schraps
- Elected: 2017, 2021, 2025

Hameln-Pyrmont – Holzminden is an electoral constituency (German: Wahlkreis) represented in the Bundestag. It elects one member via first-past-the-post voting. Under the current constituency numbering system, it is designated as constituency 46. It is located in southern Lower Saxony, comprising the Hameln-Pyrmont and Holzminden districts and a small part of the Northeim district.

Hameln-Pyrmont – Holzminden was created for the inaugural 1949 federal election. Since 2017, it has been represented by Johannes Schraps of the Social Democratic Party (SPD).

== Geography ==
Hameln-Pyrmont – Holzminden is located in eastern Lower Saxony. As of the 2021 federal election, it comprises the district of Hameln-Pyrmont and Holzminden, as well as the municipalities of Bodenfelde and Uslar and Solling area from the Northeim district.

== History ==
Hameln-Pyrmont – Holzminden was created in 1949, then known as Hameln – Springe. In the 1980 through 1990 elections, it was named Hameln – Holzminden. It acquired its current name in the 1994 election. In the inaugural Bundestag election, it was Lower Saxony constituency 24 in the numbering system. From 1953 through 1961, it was number 46. From 1965 through 1998, it was number 41. In the 2002 and 2005 elections, it was number 46. In the 2009 election, it was number 47. Since the 2013 election, it has been number 46.

Originally, the constituency comprised the independent city of Hameln and the districts of Hameln-Pyrmont and Springe. In the 1980 through 1998 elections, the constituency comprised the entirety of the Hameln-Pyrmont and Holzminden districts. It acquired its current borders in the 2002 election.

Election	No.	Name	Borders
1949	24	Hameln – Springe	Hameln city; Hameln-Pyrmont district; Springe district
1953	46	Hameln – Springe	Hameln city; Hameln-Pyrmont district; Springe district
1957	46	Hameln – Springe	Hameln city; Hameln-Pyrmont district; Springe district
1961	46	Hameln – Springe	Hameln city; Hameln-Pyrmont district; Springe district
1965	41	Hameln – Springe	Hameln city; Hameln-Pyrmont district; Springe district
1969	41	Hameln – Springe	Hameln city; Hameln-Pyrmont district; Springe district
1972	41	Hameln – Springe	Hameln city; Hameln-Pyrmont district; Springe district
1976	41	Hameln – Springe	Hameln city; Hameln-Pyrmont district; Springe district
1980	41	Hameln – Holzminden	Hameln-Pyrmont district; Holzminden district
1983	41	Hameln – Holzminden	Hameln-Pyrmont district; Holzminden district
1987	41	Hameln – Holzminden	Hameln-Pyrmont district; Holzminden district
1990	41	Hameln – Holzminden	Hameln-Pyrmont district; Holzminden district
1994	41	Hameln-Pyrmont – Holzminden	Hameln-Pyrmont district; Holzminden district
1998	41	Hameln-Pyrmont – Holzminden	Hameln-Pyrmont district; Holzminden district
2002	46	Hameln-Pyrmont – Holzminden	Hameln-Pyrmont district; Holzminden district; Northeim (only Bodenfelde and Uslar municipalities and Solling area)
2005	46	Hameln-Pyrmont – Holzminden	Hameln-Pyrmont district; Holzminden district; Northeim (only Bodenfelde and Uslar municipalities and Solling area)
2009	47	Hameln-Pyrmont – Holzminden	Hameln-Pyrmont district; Holzminden district; Northeim (only Bodenfelde and Uslar municipalities and Solling area)
2013	46	Hameln-Pyrmont – Holzminden	Hameln-Pyrmont district; Holzminden district; Northeim (only Bodenfelde and Uslar municipalities and Solling area)
2017	46	Hameln-Pyrmont – Holzminden	Hameln-Pyrmont district; Holzminden district; Northeim (only Bodenfelde and Uslar municipalities and Solling area)
2021	46	Hameln-Pyrmont – Holzminden	Hameln-Pyrmont district; Holzminden district; Northeim (only Bodenfelde and Uslar municipalities and Solling area)
2025	46	Hameln-Pyrmont – Holzminden	Hameln-Pyrmont district; Holzminden district; Northeim (only Bodenfelde and Uslar municipalities and Solling area)

== Members ==
The constituency has been held by the Social Democratic Party (SPD) during all but one Bundestag term since its creation. Its first representative was Herbert Kriedemann of the SPD, who served from 1949 to 1953. Alexander Elbrächter of the German Party (DP) won in 1953, but Heinz Frehsee of the SPD was elected in 1957. He was succeeded in 1976 by Brigitte Schulte, who served until 2005. Gabriele Lösekrug-Möller then served from 2005 to 2017. Johannes Schraps has been representative since 2017.

Election	Member	Party	%
1949	Herbert Kriedemann	SPD	34.1
1953	Alexander Elbrächter	DP	42.3
1957	Heinz Frehsee	SPD	37.7
1961	Heinz Frehsee	SPD	44.6
1965	Heinz Frehsee	SPD	46.7
1969	Heinz Frehsee	SPD	49.5
1972	Heinz Frehsee	SPD	53.6
1976	Brigitte Schulte	SPD	49.3
1980	Brigitte Schulte	SPD	52.1
1983	Brigitte Schulte	SPD	47.6
1987	Brigitte Schulte	SPD	47.9
1990	Brigitte Schulte	SPD	46.0
1994	Brigitte Schulte	SPD	48.5
1998	Brigitte Schulte	SPD	55.8
2002	Brigitte Schulte	SPD	51.5
2005	Gabriele Lösekrug-Möller	SPD	50.2
2009	Gabriele Lösekrug-Möller	SPD	39.6
2013	Gabriele Lösekrug-Möller	SPD	42.3
2017	Johannes Schraps	SPD	39.1
2021	Johannes Schraps	SPD	43.2
2025	Johannes Schraps	SPD	33.0

== Election results ==
=== 2025 election ===
Federal election (2025): Hameln-Pyrmont – Holzminden
Notes:	Blue background denotes the winner of the electorate vote. Pink background denotes a candidate elected from their party list. Yellow background denotes an electorate win by a list member, or other incumbent. A ✓ or ✗ denotes status of any incumbent, win or lose respectively.						
Party	Candidate	Votes	%	±%	Party votes	%	±%
SPD	✓ Johannes Schraps	47,384	33.0	▼10.3	35,445	24.6	▼12.2
CDU	Mareike Wulf	41,013	28.6	▲3.0	38,855	27.0	▲4.3
AfD	Cornelius Volker	29,980	20.9	▲12.4	30,515	21.2	▲12.4
Greens	Helge Limburg	10,269	7.2	▼2.9	13,527	9.4	▼3.7
Left	Felix Bergmann	7,728	5.4	▲2.6	9,575	6.7	▲3.8
BSW					5,408	3.8	
FDP	Wilhelmina Ashlswede	4,623	3.2	▼3.7	5,667	3.9	▼6.4
FW	Jan Warnecke	2,617	1.8	▲0.3	1,052	0.7	▼0.1
Tierschutzpartei					1,820	1.3	▼0.1
Volt					614	0.4	▲0.3
PARTEI					559	0.4	▼0.3
dieBasis				▼1.4	400	0.3	▼0.9
Pirates					219	0.2	▼0.2
BD					173	0.1	
Humanists					85	0.1	0.0
MLPD					27	0.0	0.0
Team Todenhöfer							▼0.3
ÖDP							▼0.1
Informal votes		1,213			886		
Total valid votes		143,614			143,941		
Turnout		144,827	81.0	▲9.0			
SPD hold	Majority	6,371	4.4				

=== 2021 election ===
Federal election (2021): Hameln-Pyrmont – Holzminden
Notes:	Blue background denotes the winner of the electorate vote. Pink background denotes a candidate elected from their party list. Yellow background denotes an electorate win by a list member, or other incumbent. A ✓ or ✗ denotes status of any incumbent, win or lose respectively.						
Party	Candidate	Votes	%	±%	Party votes	%	±%
SPD	✓ Johannes Schraps	56,893	43.2	▲4.2	48,438	36.8	▲4.9
CDU	Mareike Wulf	33,575	25.5	▼7.8	29,809	22.6	▼9.4
Greens	Helge Limburg	13,259	10.1	▲4.7	17,274	13.1	▲5.9
AfD	Delia Klages	11,208	8.5	▼1.0	11,590	8.8	▼1.3
FDP	Moritz Mönkemeyer	9,102	6.9	▲1.1	13,624	10.4	▲1.3
Left	Stephan Marquardt	3,676	2.8	▼3.1	3,734	2.8	▼3.7
Tierschutzpartei					1,845	1.4	▲0.5
FW	Carsten Schürmann	1,979	1.5		1,122	0.9	▲0.6
dieBasis	Andreas Janus	1,856	1.4		1,546	1.2	
PARTEI					963	0.7	▲0.1
Pirates					463	0.4	▼0.1
Team Todenhöfer					416	0.3	
Volt					211	0.2	
NPD					152	0.1	▼0.2
Humanists					113	0.1	
V-Partei3					95	0.1	▼0.1
du.					79	0.1	
ÖDP					72	0.1	0.0
LKR					30	0.0	
DKP					23	0.0	0.0
MLPD					10	0.0	0.0
Informal votes		1,345			1,284		
Total valid votes		131,548			131,609		
Turnout		132,893	72.0	▼2.6			
SPD hold	Majority	23,318	17.7	▲12.0			

=== 2017 election ===
Federal election (2017): Hameln-Pyrmont – Holzminden
Notes:	Blue background denotes the winner of the electorate vote. Pink background denotes a candidate elected from their party list. Yellow background denotes an electorate win by a list member, or other incumbent. A ✓ or ✗ denotes status of any incumbent, win or lose respectively.						
Party	Candidate	Votes	%	±%	Party votes	%	±%
SPD	Johannes Schraps	54,130	39.1	▼3.2	44,190	31.9	▼4.5
CDU	Michael Vietz	46,181	33.4	▼6.2	44,424	32.0	▼5.4
AfD	Armin-Paul Hampel	13,143	9.5	▲5.8	14,054	10.1	▲6.1
Left	Jutta Krellmann	8,220	5.9	▲1.3	9,130	6.6	▲1.3
FDP	Klaus-Peter Wennemann	8,034	5.8	▲4.0	12,531	9.0	▲4.6
Greens	Ute Martha Michel	7,511	5.4	▼0.6	9,995	7.2	▼1.2
Tierschutzpartei					1,285	0.9	▲0.2
Pirates	Hermann Gebauer	1,250	0.9	▼1.0	560	0.4	▼1.2
PARTEI					878	0.6	
NPD					411	0.3	▼0.6
FW					390	0.3	▼0.1
V-Partei³					187	0.1	
BGE					185	0.1	
DM					159	0.1	
DiB					125	0.1	
ÖDP					109	0.1	
MLPD					33	0.0	0.0
DKP					27	0.0	
Informal votes		1,311			1,107		
Total valid votes		138,469			138,673		
Turnout		139,780	74.6	▲2.8			
SPD hold	Majority	7,949	5.7	▲3.0			

=== 2013 election ===
Federal election (2013): Hameln-Pyrmont – Holzminden
Notes:	Blue background denotes the winner of the electorate vote. Pink background denotes a candidate elected from their party list. Yellow background denotes an electorate win by a list member, or other incumbent. A ✓ or ✗ denotes status of any incumbent, win or lose respectively.						
Party	Candidate	Votes	%	±%	Party votes	%	±%
SPD	✓ Gabriele Lösekrug-Möller	57,484	42.3	▲2.7	49,411	36.4	▲3.0
CDU	Michael Vietz	53,726	39.6	▲4.3	50,937	37.5	▲8.3
Greens	Marcus Schaper	8,202	6.0	▼1.7	11,428	8.4	▼1.0
Left	Jutta Krellmann	6,308	4.6	▼3.7	7,201	5.3	▼3.8
AfD	Manfred Otto	4,971	3.7		5,550	4.1	
Pirates	Claudia Schumann	2,577	1.9		2,152	1.6	▼0.2
FDP	Klaus-Peter Wennemann	2,496	1.8	▼5.5	5,985	4.4	▼9.6
NPD					1,271	0.9	▼0.5
Tierschutzpartei					1,031	0.8	▼0.2
FW					461	0.3	
PBC					185	0.1	
PRO					150	0.1	
REP					104	0.1	
MLPD					30	0.0	0.0
Informal votes		2,075			1,943		
Total valid votes		135,764			135,896		
Turnout		137,839	71.8	▼0.7			
SPD hold	Majority	3,758	2.7	▼1.6			

=== 2009 election ===
Federal election (2009): Hameln-Pyrmont – Holzminden
Notes:	Blue background denotes the winner of the electorate vote. Pink background denotes a candidate elected from their party list. Yellow background denotes an electorate win by a list member, or other incumbent. A ✓ or ✗ denotes status of any incumbent, win or lose respectively.						
Party	Candidate	Votes	%	±%	Party votes	%	±%
SPD	✓ Gabriele Lösekrug-Möller	55,842	39.6	▼10.6	47,115	33.4	▼14.0
CDU	Hans Peter Thul	49,787	35.3	▲0.4	41,166	29.1	▼0.2
Left	Jutta Krellmann	11,820	8.4	▲4.1	12,911	9.1	▲4.6
Greens	Marcus Schaper	10,849	7.7	▲3.3	13,322	9.4	▲3.2
FDP	Martina Tigges-Friedrichs	10,401	7.4	▲2.7	19,736	14.0	▲4.3
Pirates					2,571	1.8	
NPD	Jürgen Neumann	2,283	1.6	▲0.1	1,982	1.4	▼0.1
Tierschutzpartei					1,285	0.9	▲0.2
RRP					820	0.6	
ÖDP					130	0.1	
DVU					146	0.1	
MLPD					53	0.0	0.0
Informal votes		2,203			1,948		
Total valid votes		140,982			141,237		
Turnout		143,185	72.5	▼6.3			
SPD hold	Majority	6,055	4.3	▼11.0			

=== 2005 election ===
Federal election (2005):Hameln-Pyrmont – Holzminden
Notes:	Blue background denotes the winner of the electorate vote. Pink background denotes a candidate elected from their party list. Yellow background denotes an electorate win by a list member, or other incumbent. A ✓ or ✗ denotes status of any incumbent, win or lose respectively.						
Party	Candidate	Votes	%	±%	Party votes	%	±%
SPD	Gabriele Lösekrug-Möller	78,435	50.2	▼1.2	74,129	47.4	▼4.1
CDU	Hans Thul	54,582	35.0	▼0.5	45,916	29.4	▼3.6
FDP	Heinrich Fockenbrock	7,248	4.6	▼2.3	15,170	9.7	▲3.0
Greens	Jürgen Mackenthun	6,815	4.4	▼0.4	9,756	6.2	▲0.9
Left	Jack-Peter Kurbjuweit	6,737	4.3	▲3.1	7,057	4.5	▲3.6
NPD	Heiko Ebbenga	2,321	1.5		2,283	1.5	▲1.1
Tierschutzpartei					1,049	0.7	▲0.3
GRAUEN					436	0.3	▲0.2
PBC					361	0.2	0.0
Pro German Center – Pro D-Mark Initiative					141	0.1	
BüSo					66	0.0	0.0
MLPD					44	0.0	
Informal votes		2,623			2,353		
Total valid votes		156,138			156,408		
Turnout		158,761	78.9	▼2.3			
SPD hold	Majority	23,853	15.2				
