= Lauenstein =

Lauenstein is the name of the following:

Places:

- Lauenstein (Altenberg), a suburb of the town of Altenberg in the district of Sächsische Schweiz-Osterzgebirge in Saxony, Germany
- Lauenstein (Ludwigsstadt) a suburb of the town of Ludwigsstadt in the district of Kronach in Bavaria, Germany
- Lauenstein (Salzhemmendorf), a village in the municipality of Salzhemmendorf in the district of Hameln-Pyrmont in Lower Saxony, Germany

Castles:

- Lauenstein (Altenberg), castle ruins and manor house in Lauenstein in the district of Sächsische Schweiz-Osterzgebirge in Saxony, Germany
- Lauenstein Castle (Franconian Forest) in Ludwigsstadt in the district of Kronach in Bavaria, Germany
- Lauenstein Castle (Ith) in Salzhemmendorf in the district of Hameln-Pyrmont in Lower Saxony, Germany

People:

- Christoph Lauenstein (b 1962), German film maker
- Diether Lauenstein (1914–1990), German indologist, priest and journalist
- Wolfgang Lauenstein (b 1962), German film maker

Radiographic positioning:

- Lauenstein projection is a radiographic positioning used to take an x-ray image of patient's hip joint.
