= Lauenstein (Salzhemmendorf) =

- Ortsteil of Salzhemmendorf
- Interactive map of Lauenstein
- Location within Germany Location within Lower Saxony
- Coordinates: 52°4′38″N 9°33′15″E
- Country: Germany
- State: Lower Saxony
- District: Hameln-Pyrmont
- Municipality: Salzhemmendorf
- Elevation: 140–233 m (459–764 ft)

Population (2008-12-31)
  - Total: 2,083
- Time zone: UTC+01:00 (CET)
  - Summer (DST): UTC+02:00 (CEST)
- Postal codes: 31020
- Dialling codes: 05153

Lauenstein is a village in the municipality of Salzhemmendorf in the Lower Saxon district of Hameln-Pyrmont in north Germany. It has about 2,100 inhabitants.

== Geography ==
Lauenstein lies in the Weser Uplands, not far from the only low saddle in the crest of the Ith, in a valley that descends eastwards at right angles to the Ith ridge. Part of its more recent built-up area extends out of the valley to the eastern slopes of the Ith and into the Saale valley.

== History ==
=== Feudal tenure ===
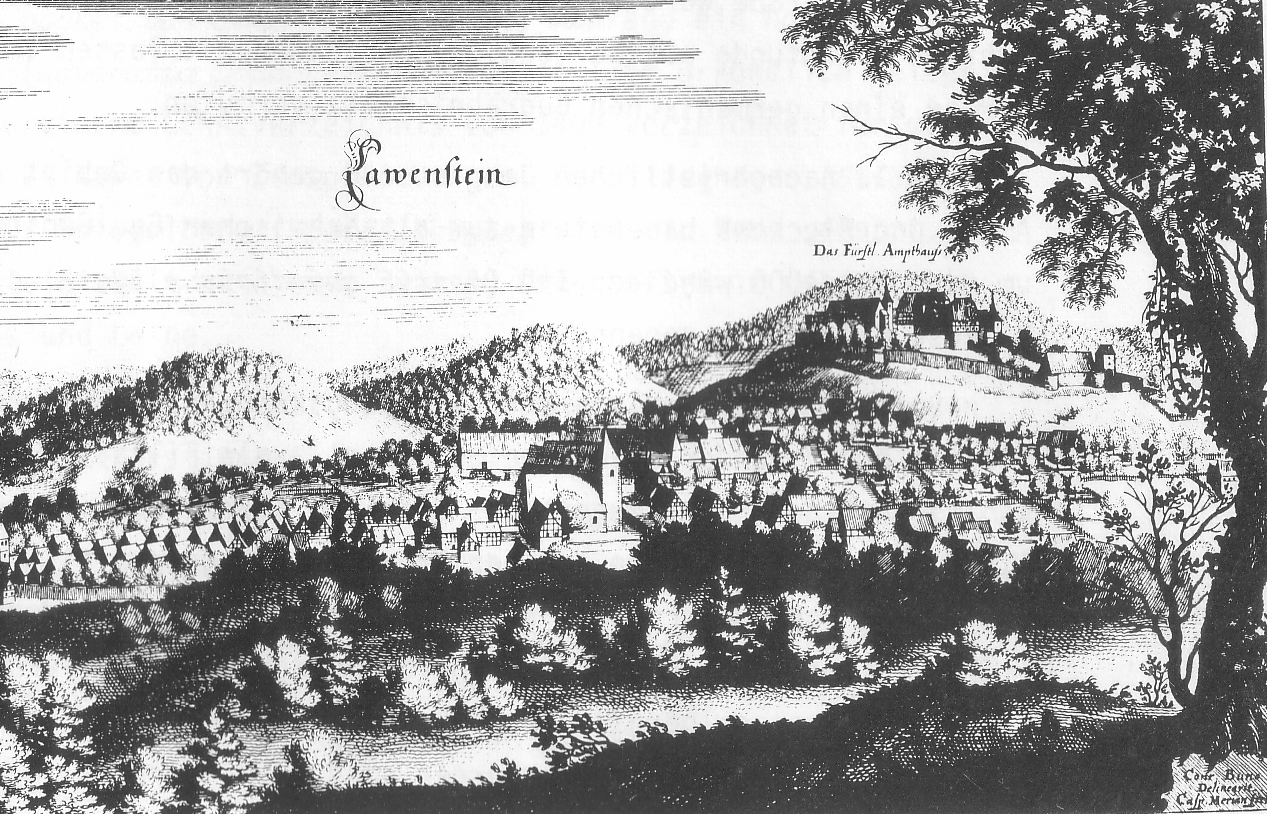
Lauenstein in 1654

The feudal lords in the district (Amt) area were the barons of Homburg, who exercised power from 1152 to 1409. Their seat was at the castle of Homburg near Eschershausen. The counts of Spiegelberg were also feudal lords here from 1152 to 1557. They resided at Spiegelberg Castle and later at Coppenbrügge Castle. Another important feudal lord was Bock von Nordholz, who was resident at Nordholz Castle in Nordholz on the Osterwald.

=== Middle Ages ===
Around 1215 Count Bernard of Poppenburg built Spiegelberg Castle and called himself thereafter Count Bernard of Spiegelberg. In 1226 the demise of the Spiegelberg was reported, when the barons of Homburg from Stadtoldendorf fought for the territorial estate of Bernard of Spiegelberg and were able to unite it with their lordship of Homburg into an advocacy (Vogtei). Bernard had to leave the country by order of the emperor. Above the present village of Lauenstein the Homburgs built Lauenstein Castle, probably in the 13th century, which became the new Castrum Lewenstein. It was mentioned as such for the first time in 1247, when Henry of Homburg transferred the castle to the Welf duke, Otto the Child and received it back as a fief. Shortly thereafter villages in the area were abandoned as their inhabitants sought the protection of the castle and established the new village of Lauenstein at its foot.

== Personalities ==
- Ernst Rudorff (1840–1916), composer, music teacher and conservationist in Lauenstein
- Otto Kreibaum, (1902–1985), businessman, founder of OKAL (Otto Kreibaum aus Lauenstein)
