= Nesselberg =

Coordinates: 52°10′N 9°34′E

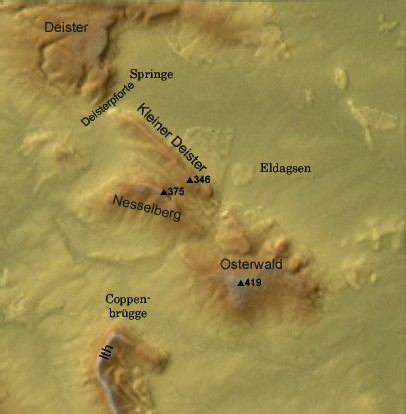
The Kleiner Deister, Nesselberg and Osterwald

The Nesselberg is a ridge up to 378.2 m above sea level (NN) high in the Calenberg Highland which, together with the Kleiner Deister and the Osterwald, forms a group of three contiguous hill regions in the northwestern part of the Leine Uplands. It lies between Altenhagen I and Coppenbrügge in Lower Saxony, Germany.

== Geography ==
The Nesselberg is located more or less north of Coppenbrügge, immediately south of the Kleiner Deister and north west of the Osterwald. It lies north of the Gelbbach valley, through which state road no. 422 runs from Eldagsen to Coppenbrügge. Immediately east of this valley is the Osterwald. The border between Hanover region and the district of Hameln-Pyrmont runs along the crest of the Nesselberg.

On the saddle between the Nesselberg and Kleine Deister, and therefore between the Wolfsköpfen to the northeast and the Grasberg to the southwest, stands the old Wolfsbuche (today a car park for walkers); the Schwarze Bach ("Black Brook"), a tributary of the Gehlenbach rises here. Both ridges lies within the borough of Springe, the Springe municipalities of Altenhagen I and Eldagsen as well as the Brünnighausen and Dörpe in the municipality of Coppenbrügge.

Over the crest of the Nesselberg runs part of the sandstone wall known as the Saupark Springe which is around 16 km long and 2 m high and which runs for a long way over the Kleiner Deister. Part of the Roswithaweg footpath also runs from north to south over the Nesselberg and the neighbouring Kleiner Deister; this is a long-distance hiking trail from Nienburg/Weser to Bad Gandersheim.

Since 1954 the Kleine Deister and the Nesselberg have formed a nature reserve covering an area of about 2,500 hectares (6,200 acres) which includes the Saupark Springe.

== Geology ==
The Nesselberg is characterised by eroded sandstones, siltstones and clays, in places with deposits of anthracite. They are the so-called Obernkirchen layers (Wealden) of the Lower Cretaceous period.

== Hills ==
- Schierenbrink 372.2 m above sea level (NN)
- Grasberg 378,2 m
- Mangel 374,9 m
- Bolleser ca. 300 m

== Places of interest ==
On the Nesselberg there are still old sandstone quarries and the ruins of the circular rampart of Kukesburg near Altenhagen I.

The stone quarries near Altenhagen I provided employment after 1900 to 400 miners, who broke down the valuable Deister sandstone. This outstanding architectural stone with its bright white/yellow colour was used for the opera house and new town hall in Hanover, in the Reichstag building in Berlin and other buildings across the whole of Europe.

The Saupark Springe in the neighbouring hills of the Kleiner Deister is also worth seeing.

== Protected areas ==
Parts of the Saupark Nature Reserve lie on the Nesselberg (CDDA No. 30110; designated in 1954; 24.448 km²). The protected landscapes of Osterwald-Saupark (CDDA No. 323574; 1972; 16.094 km²) and Nördlicher Osterwald und Umgebung (CDDA No. 323273; 1972; 18.16 km²) extend up to spurs radiating from the ridge.
