= Kleiner Deister =

Coordinates: 52°11′N 9°34′E

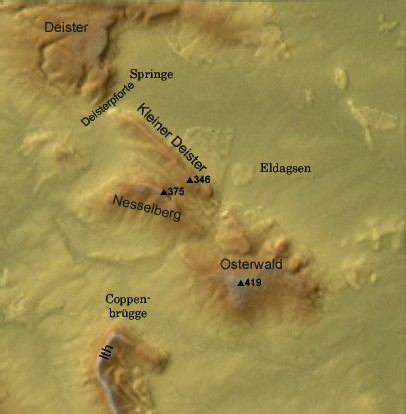
Kleiner Deister, Nesselberg and Osterwald

The Kleiner Deister is a ridge of hills (up to 345.7 m above sea level (NN)) in the Calenberg Uplands which, together with the Nesselberg and the Osterwald, forms a group of three adjacent hill ranges in the northern part of the Leine Uplands. It lies between Springe and Eldagsen in Hanover region in Lower Saxony, Germany.

== Geography ==
The Kleiner Deister is located immediately south of Springe and just north of the Nesselberg. It is drained by the river Haller.

The B 217 federal highway from Hanover to Hamelin runs through the flat pass of the Deister Gate. In the south east the Kleiner Deister is separated from the northern foothills of the Osterwald by a valley through which run both the Gehlenbach stream and the L 422 from Eldagsen to Coppenbrügge.

At once time the old Wolfsbuche stood on the saddle between the Kleiner Deister and the Nesselberg and therefore between the Wolfsköpfe in the northeast and the Grasberg in the southwest; this was also the source of the Schwarze Bach, a tributary of the Gehlenbach. Both ridges lies between the villages of Springe-Altenhagen, the heart of Springe, Eldagsen and Coppenbrügge-Brünnighausen.

Part of a European long-distance path, the Roswithaweg ("Roswitha path"), runs over the Kleiner Deister and the neighbouring Nesselberg hills from north to south. The Kleiner Deister ist almost entirely surrounded by a 16.3 km long and 2 m high sandstone wall which, in the south, runs over the crest of the Nesselberg. The Saupark Springe - a wildlife park - is located here. It is the main attraction of the ridge and has many species of wild animal.

== Geology ==
The Kleiner Deister has a Hercynian strike and forms the northeast wing of a large syncline. The strata of the Deister on both sides of the crest stem from the Jurassic and Cretaceous periods; these are inverted in the case of the Kleiner Deister.

The side of the Kleiner Deister that descends southwest to the Nesselberg is made of stratified sandstones, siltstones and clays, with deposits of anthracite in places. These are the so-called Obernkirchen strata (Wealden) of the Lower Cretaceous.

The northeastern slopes of the Kleiner Deister are characterised by marls, clays and limestones. These are the so-called Münder marls of the Upper Jurassic.

== Hills ==
- Burgberg ca. 325 m above sea level (NN)
- Wolfsköpfe 345.7 m above NN
- Drakenberg 321 m above NN
- Raher Berg 285.1 m above NN
- Hallermundskopf 218.7 m above NN

== Flora and fauna ==
The Saupark Springe is bounded by a wall which encloses much of the Kleiner Deister. The wildlife park has Wild Boar as well as Red Deer, Roe Deer, Fallow Deer and Mouflon. It also has a number of caves in which rare species of bat may be found. The actual park is an old deciduous mixed forest of beech and oak, birch and chestnut avenues. In addition to crags, caves, barrows, springs and wild meadows there is a wide range of rare animals and plants. Part of the Saupark, the Springe Bison Enclosure (Wisentgehege Springe), is a deer park in which visitors can observe wild animals at close range. In addition to breeding the almost extinct Bison, the enclosure is also home to Elk, Mouflon, wild horses, owls and birds of prey.

Since 1954 the Kleiner Deister and the Nesselberg have formed a nature reserve with a total of around 2,500 hectares (6,200 acres) which includes the Saupark Springe.

== Places of interest ==
In addition to Saupark Springe and the Springe Bison Enclosure with their animals and plants, demonstration areas for deer feeding and Stone Age barrows; other points of interest include old sandstone quarries on the Nesselberg, the ruins of the medieval Hallermund Castle on the Hallermundskopf and the remains of an Early Middle Ages circular rampart, the Kukesburg, near Altenhagen. In the stone quarries near Altenhagen 400 miners were employed around 1900 to extract the valuable Deister sandstone. This outstanding architectural stone was used in the opera house and new city hall at Hanover, in the Reichstag building in Berlin and other buildings across the whole of Europe.

== Photographs ==
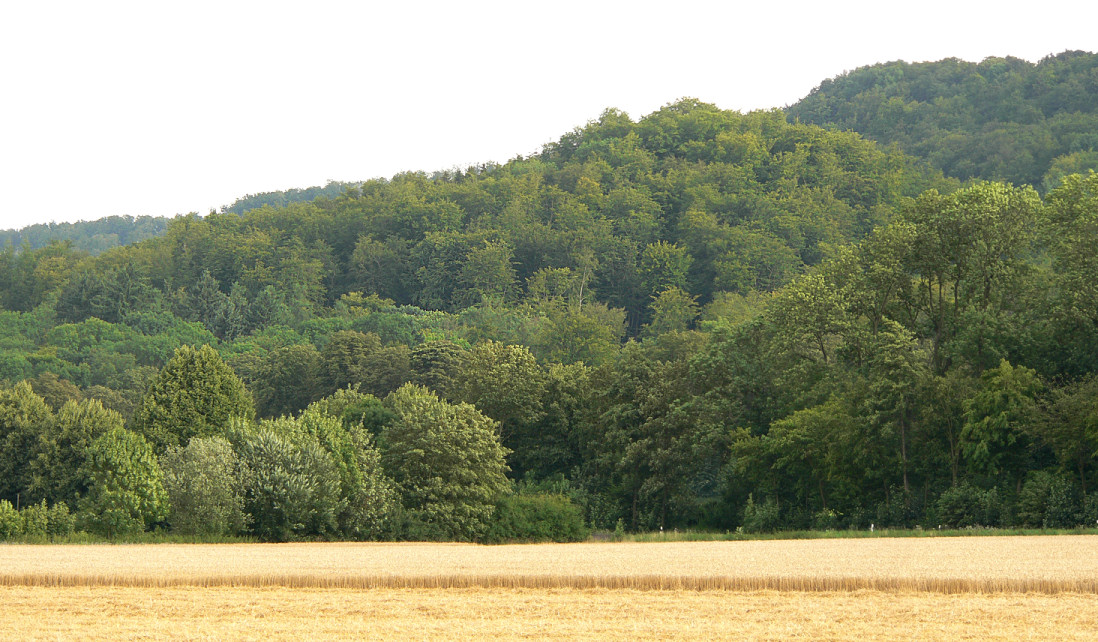
The Hallermundskopf with the ruins of Hallermund Castle

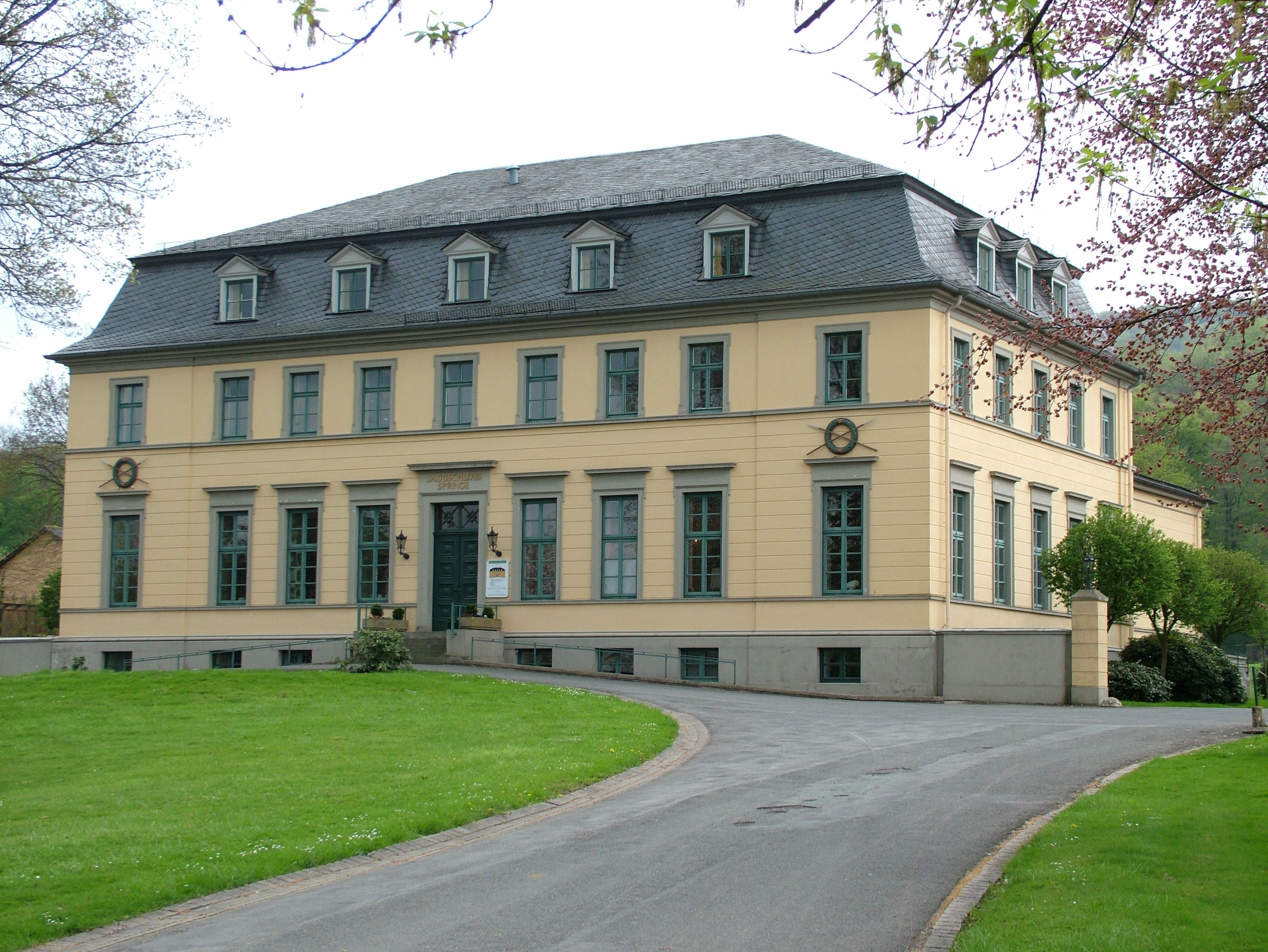
Hunting lodge at the main entrance to the Saupark Springe

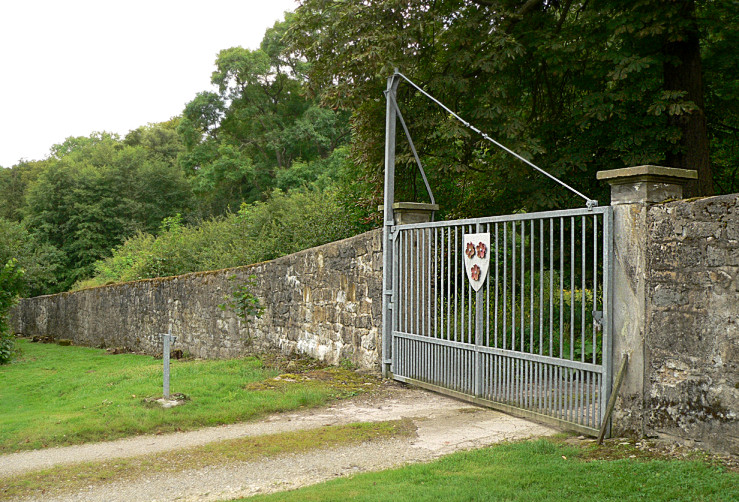
Wall of the Saupark Springe with gate

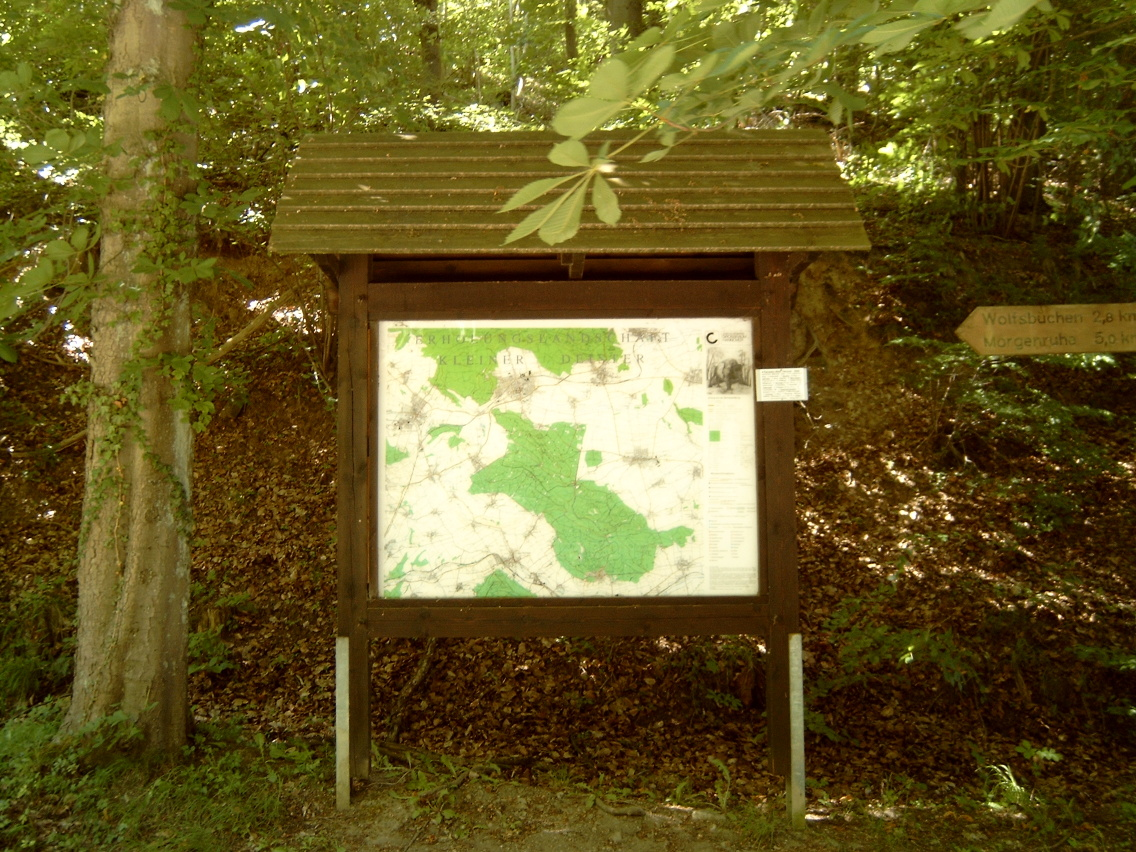
Information board for the "Kleiner Deister leisure region"
