= Deister Gate =

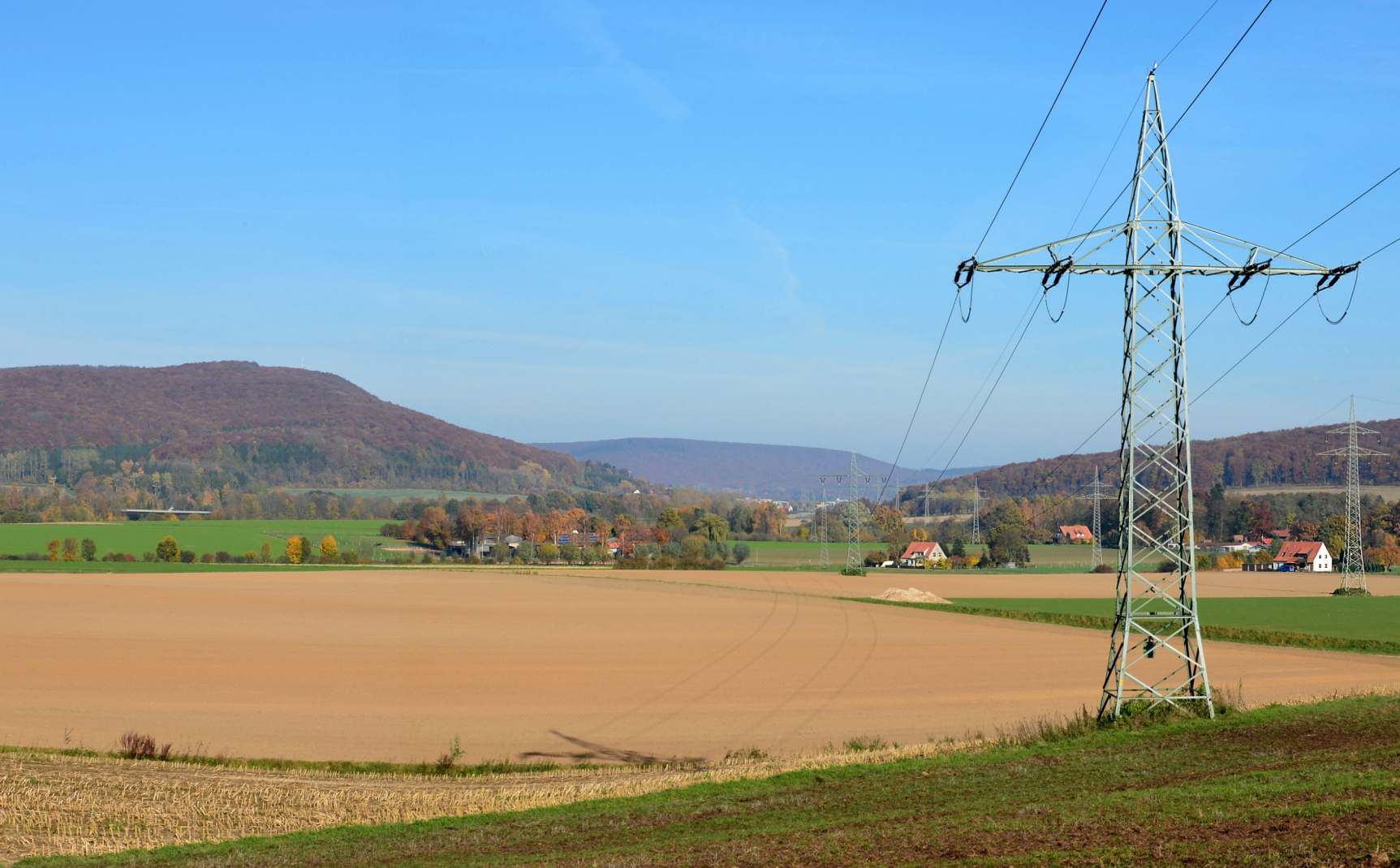
- View from the Katzberg ridge of the Deister Gate. Left: the Ebersberg; right: the Raher Berg
- Interactive map of Deister Gate
- Elevation: 130DE-NN

Third Approach
- Coordinates: 52°11′59″N 9°31′41″E

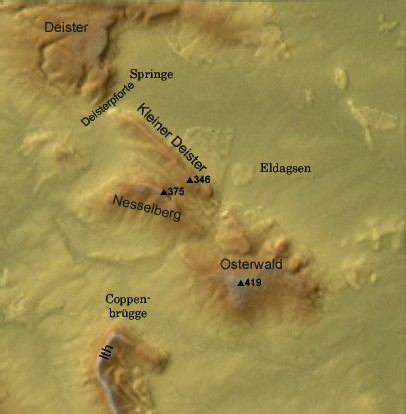
The Deister Gate between the Deister and Kleiner Deister

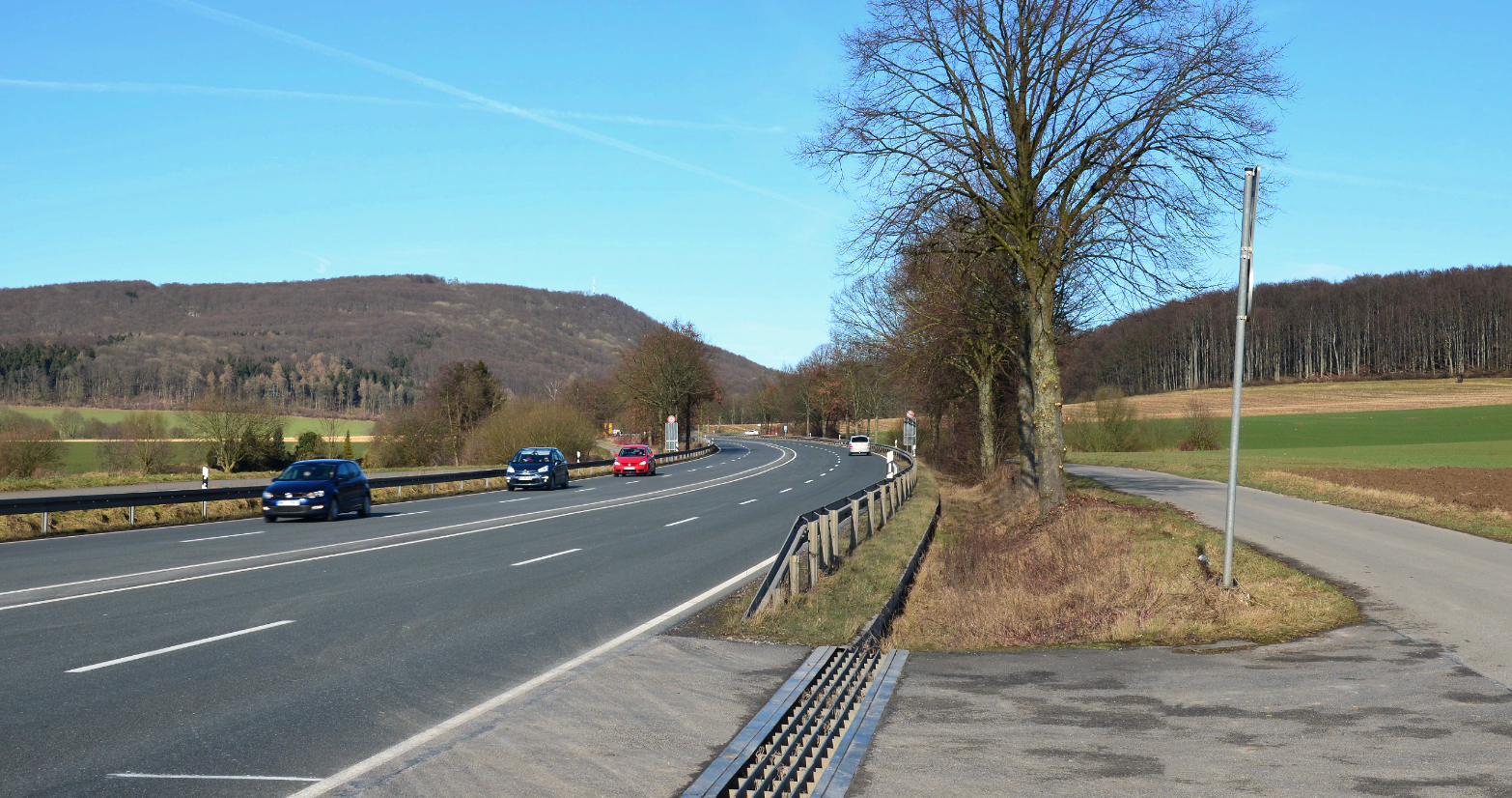
The Bundesstraße 217 (B217) near Sedemünder with a view of the Deister Gate

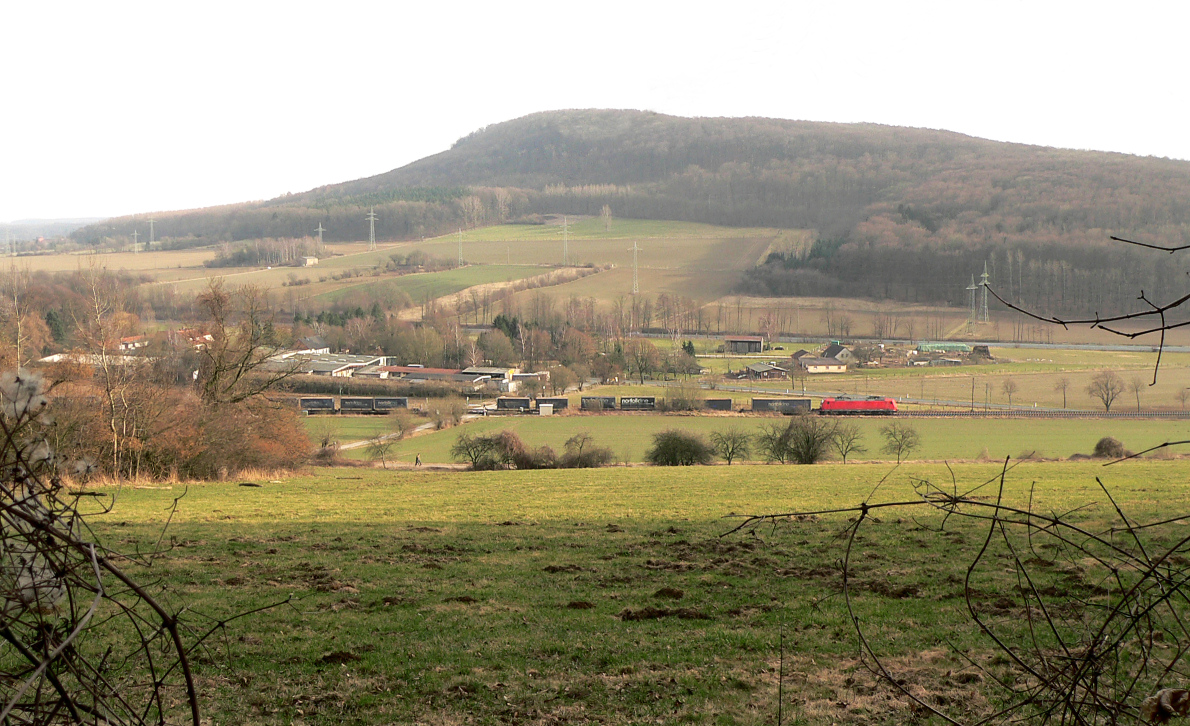
View from the Ebersberg of the pass of the Deister Gate

The Deister Gate (German: Deisterpforte) is a 550-metre-wide gap between the Deister and Kleiner Deister hill ridges in Springe in Hanover Region, Lower Saxony, Germany. The height of the pass varies between 130 m above NN to 120 m above NN. The River Haller rises in the Deister Gate. Several transport and supply routes run through the Deister Gate.

== Etymology ==
Around the year 1,000, the site of the karst spring in the Deister Gate is mentioned in a description of the boundaries of the Bishopric of Hildesheim under the name Helereisprig. The Haller forms the boundary between the Bishoprics (now Dioceses) of Hildesheim to the south and Minden to the north. The location of the karst spring was called Hallerbrunn in 1631, Haller Brunn in 1783, Hallerbrunn in 1896, and Hallerbrunnen in 1950. The town of Springe derives its name from the source of the Haller; until the 18th century it was called Hallerspring. Hans-Heinrich Seedorf suspects, "that Haller means something like noisesome, swift stream."

== Geography ==
The Deister Gate is bounded to the north by the Ebersberg (355 m above NN) and to the south by the Raher Berg (285 m above NN). The Bundesstraße 217 (B 217) from Hanover to Hamelin, a Landstraße, two farm and forest tracks, the Hanover–Altenbeken railway, carrying S-Bahn line 5 from Paderborn via Hamelin and Hannover Central to Hanover Airport, and the upper reaches of the River Haller run through the pass. The E1 European long distance path runs along the forest track on the edge of the Deister and through the Deister Gate.

South of the Deister Gate, in the valley of the Hamel lie the villages of Bad Münder und Altenhagen I, the state farm of Dahle and the abandoned village of Sedemünder. There, in front of the Deister Gate, the Battle of Sedemünder took place on 28 July 1260. To the north is the Haller valley and the town of Springe in the Springe Bowl (Springer Kessel). In this direction, 600 metres from the pass, was once a sawmill powered by the Haller. Today a furniture factory stands on the site.

At the southern edge of the Deister Gate is an old quarry on the side of the Raher Berg. In the lower part of the quarry stands a club house, above it the quarry climbs like a romantic valley up the hillside. Nearby is a forest track through the woods which cuts through the Bückethaler Landwehr, which is described here on an information board. The forest track then continues to the town of Springe.

The forest inn, Deisterpforte, was built in 1876 by the Ratskeller publican, Christian Bauer, on the edge of Springe as a daytrippers' destination; it is still in operation.

== Literature ==
- Ludger Feldmann: Als Springe an der Weser lag – die geologische Geschichte der Deisterpforte. In: Springer Jahrbuch 2011 für die Stadt und den Altkreis Springe, Förderverein für die Stadtgeschichte von Springe e.V., Springe, 2011. S, 10–22, 209–211.
- Förderverein für die Stadtgeschichte von Springe e. V.: Erlebnisweg vom Schulzentrum Süd zur Hallerquelle. Springe, 2013.
