= Gabriele Lösekrug-Möller =

Former member of the Bundestag

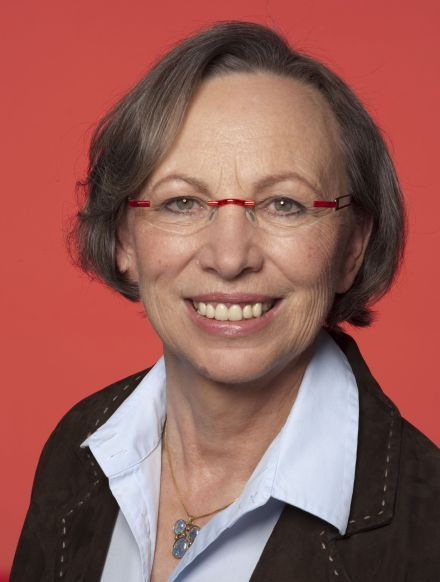
- Lösekrug-Möller in 2009

Parliamentary State Secretary for the Minister of Labour and Social Affairs
- In office 17 December 2013 – January 2018
- Minister: Andrea Nahles; Katarina Barley (acting); Hubertus Heil
- Preceded by: Ralf Brauksiepe; Hans-Joachim Fuchtel
- Succeeded by: Kerstin Griese

Member of the Bundestag; from Lower Saxony
- In office 1 November 2001 – 24 October 2017
- Preceded by: Dietmar Schütz
- Succeeded by: Johannes Schraps
- Constituency: Oldenburg – Ammerland (2001–2002); State list (2002–2005); Hameln-Pyrmont – Holzminden (2005–2017)

Personal details
- Born: Gabriele Meyer; 20 April 1951 (age 75) Bovenden, West Germany
- Party: Social Democratic
- Children: 2
- Education: Protestant University of Applied Sciences Hanover
- Committees: Committee on Labour and Social Affairs; Committee on the Environment; Subcommittee on Local Government Policy
- Nickname: LöMö

Gabriele Lösekrug-Möller (née Meyer; born 20 April 1951), often nicknamed LöMö, is a German politician and former member of the Bundestag. A member of the Social Democratic Party (SPD), she joined the Bundestag in 2001. She won the direct mandate for the constituency Hameln-Pyrmont – Holzminden from 2005 onwards. Prior to her political career, Lösekrug-Möller was a bookseller and social worker. She retired from federal politics in 2017.

== Early life and education ==
Gabriele Lösekrug-Möller was born on 20 April 1951 in Bovenden, Lower Saxony. She graduated from Realschule in 1966 and started an apprenticeship in the book trade. Lösekrug-Möller then worked as a bookseller until 1974. She received a technical university entrance qualification and studied social pedagogy at the Evangelische Fachhochschule Hannover, graduating in 1979.

Following her graduation from university, Lösekrug-Möller worked as a social worker in Isernhagen. She moved to a career in adult education and organisational consulting in 1990. She is a member of the ÖTV and ver.di trada unions, and of the Worker's Welfare Association.

== Local politics ==
Lösekrug-Möller joined the SPD in 1972. She was a member of the council of the Hameln-Pyrmont district between 1996 and 2011. In 1997, she was elected as the chairwoman of the Hameln-Pyrmont SPD subdistrict. In 1999, Lösekrug-Möller was elected to the executive committee of the SPD's Hanover district, and in 2004 she was elected to the executive committee in Lower Saxony.

== Bundestag ==
Lösekrug-Möller joined the Bundestag in 2001. From 2002 to 2009, she was the spokesperson for the SPD parliamentary group (Fraktion) working group on petitions. In 2013, she was appointed Parliamentary State Secretary for Labour and Social Affairs. In 2017, she voted in favour of same-sex marriage in Germany.

She was a member of the Bundestag Committee on Labour and Social Affairs, Committee on the Environment, and the Subcommittee on Local Government Policy. During her time in the Bundestag, she also served as the second chairwoman of the Advisory Council on Sustainable Development. Between 2011 and 2014 she served as the chairwoman of the Lower Saxony/Bremen regional groups of the SPD Fraktion.

Lösekrug-Möller retired from the Bundestag before the 2017 election. She was succeeded in her constituency by Johannes Schraps. She remained as Parliamentary State Secretary in an interim position until January 2018.

== Personal life ==
Lösekrug-Möller is Protestant. She has two sons. As of August 2013, she lives in Hameln.

== Awards ==
- Order of Merit of the Federal Republic of Germany

== Electoral history ==
Year	Constituency
2002	State list of Lower Saxony
2005	Hameln-Pyrmont – Holzminden
2009	Hameln-Pyrmont – Holzminden
2013	Hameln-Pyrmont – Holzminden
