= Mareike Wulf =

German politician

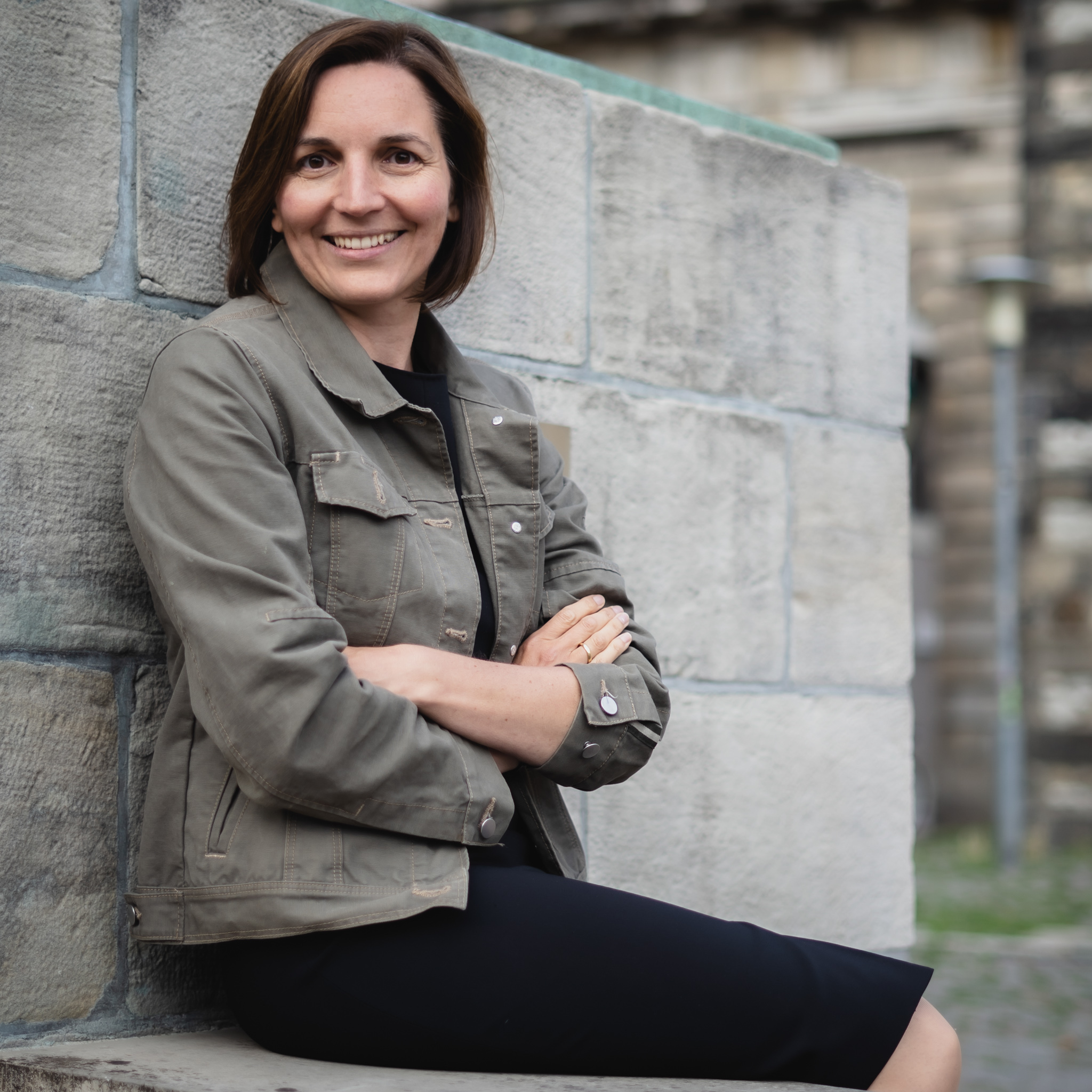

Member of the Bundestag
- Incumbent
- Assumed office 2021

Personal details
- Born: 15 November 1979 (age 46) Rendsburg, Schleswig-Holstein, West Germany (now Germany)
- Party: Christian Democratic Union
- Education: Humboldt University of Berlin

Mareike Lotte Wulf (born 15 November 1979) is a German politician (CDU) who has been serving as a member of the German Bundestag since 2021. From 2017 to 2021, she was a member of the Lower Saxony state parliament.

In addition to her work in parliament, Wulf has been serving as Parliamentary State Secretary at the Federal Ministry of Education, Family Affairs, Senior Citizens, Women and Youth in the government of Chancellor Friedrich Merz since 2025.

== Early life and career ==
After graduating from the Herbartgymnasium Oldenburg in 1999, Wulf studied cultural studies in Frankfurt (Oder) up to intermediate diploma. Following one year of studies of political science in Lille, France, Wulf graduated with a degree in social science from Humboldt University of Berlin.

Wulf then worked at the Unternehmerverbände Niedersachsen (UVN) (Lower Saxony Business Associations) in Hanover, first as an education officer and later as head of education and social policy. In 2017, she was a member of UVN's management board until she moved into the state parliament, where she was also responsible for the employment market.

Wulf is married.

== Political career ==
=== Career in state politics ===
Wulf entered Lower Saxony politics as a career changer; she stood for election for the first time in the 2017 Lower Saxony state election and with 25.4% was defeated in the constituency of Hannover-Mitte by SPD candidate Alptekin Kırcı, who won 41.4% of the primary vote. Nevertheless, she entered the state parliament via 12th place on the CDU state list. She was the designated Minister of Education in the shadow cabinet of CDU's top candidate Bernd Althusmann; however, following coalition negotiations, this department went to Grant Hendrik Tonne (SPD). Mareike Wulf was elected deputy chairwoman of the CDU parliamentary group in the state parliament with responsibility for the areas of culture and economics. In July 2021, Mareike Wulf was elected chairwoman of the Women's Union of Lower Saxony.

=== Member of the German Parliament, 2021–present ===
In the 2021 German federal election, Wulf stood as a direct candidate in the electoral district Hameln-Pyrmont - Holzminden and in 9th place on the CDU state list of Lower Saxony, which won her a seat in the German Bundestag. She resigned from her state parliament mandate and was succeeded by Colette Thiemann.

In 2023, Wulf joined a cross-party working group on dogs.

== Other activities ==
- Rotary International, Member
