= Lauenstein Castle (Ith) =

Castle ruins in Lower Saxony, Germany

- Burg Lauenstein
- Lauenstein
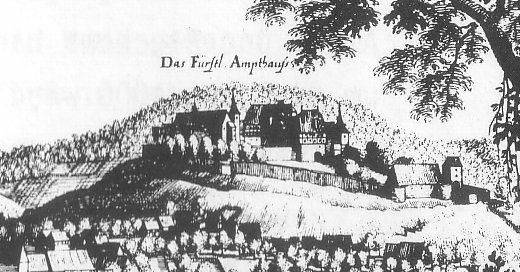
- Lauenstein castle hill in a 1654 copperplate

Site information
- Type: hill castle
- Code: DE-NI
- Condition: ruin

Location
- Coordinates: 52°04′35″N 9°32′56″E

Site history
- Built: 1247

Garrison information
- Occupants: Nobility (Edelherren)

Lauenstein Castle (German: Burg Lauenstein) is a former hill castle that is now in ruins. It lies above the Salzhemmendorf village of Lauenstein in the German state of Lower Saxony. The castle was built in the 13th century by the barons of Homburg. From the 16th century it became militarily insignificant and was demolished in the 19th century due to its increasing state of dilapidation.

== Location ==
The ruins of Lauenstein castle are located on the edge of Ith ridge on a hill summit above the village of Lauenstein. The castle terrain is covered by thick forest that was planted in the 19th century when the hill was reutilised.

== Site ==
The roughly 50 by 50 metres (160 ft × 160 ft) castle plateau lies on an eminence that is surrounded by steep hillsides. It is protected on all sides by a wide moat. The direct access to the castle was built in the form of a zwinger in front of the gateway whose walls are still 4 metres (13 ft) high today. Parts of the enceinte of the castle still exists. There is an information board at the entrance to the castle site, although there is a risk of collapse or falling due to the state of the ruined walls and the steep hillsides.

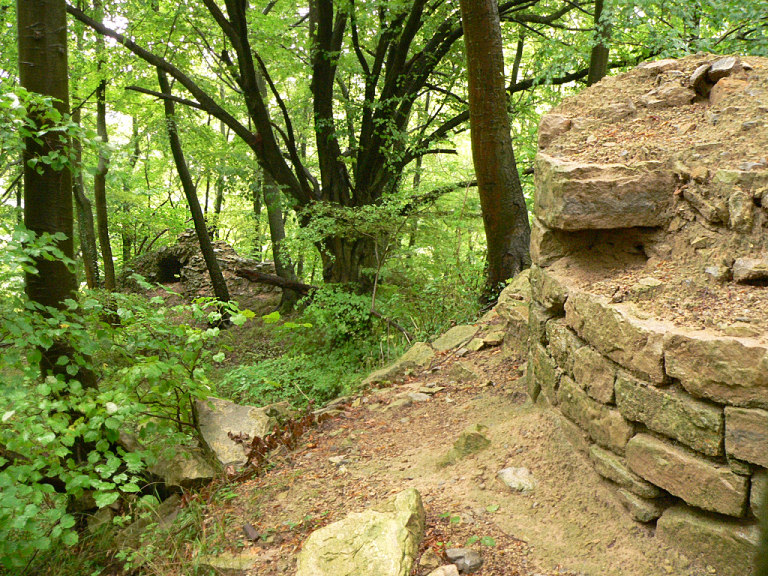
Remnants of the observation tower. Wall remnant with loophole at rear left

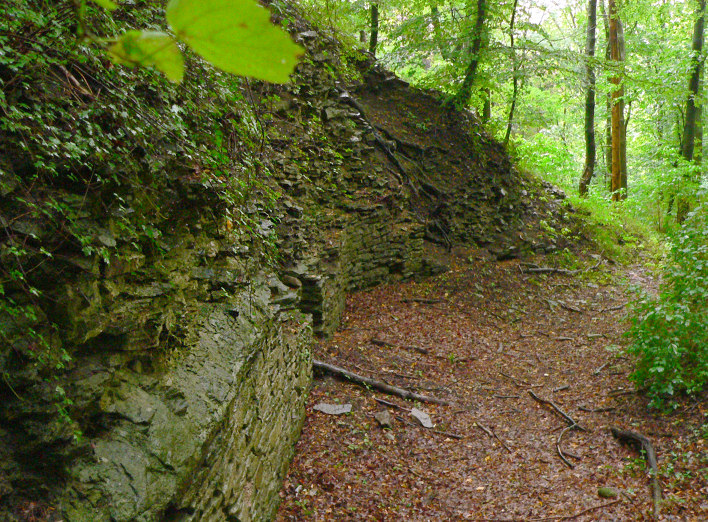
High walls of the gateway zwinger

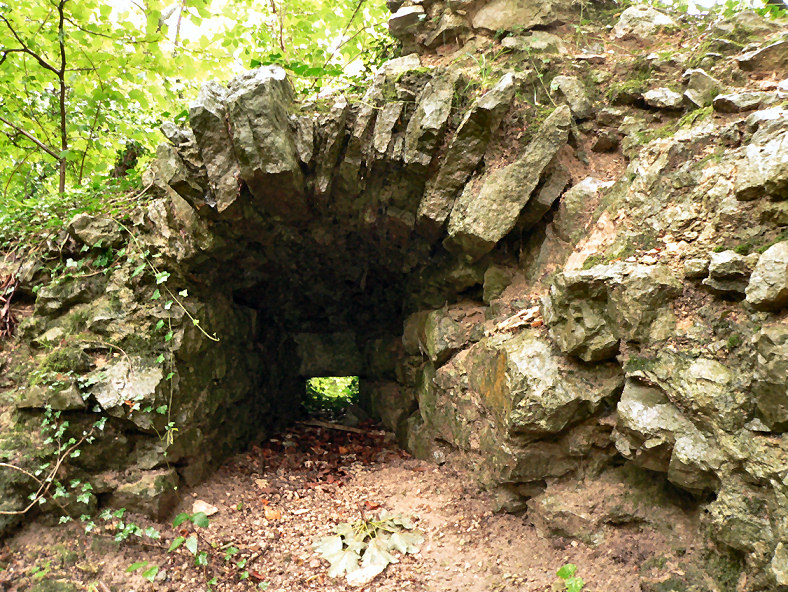
Wall or tower remnants with loophole

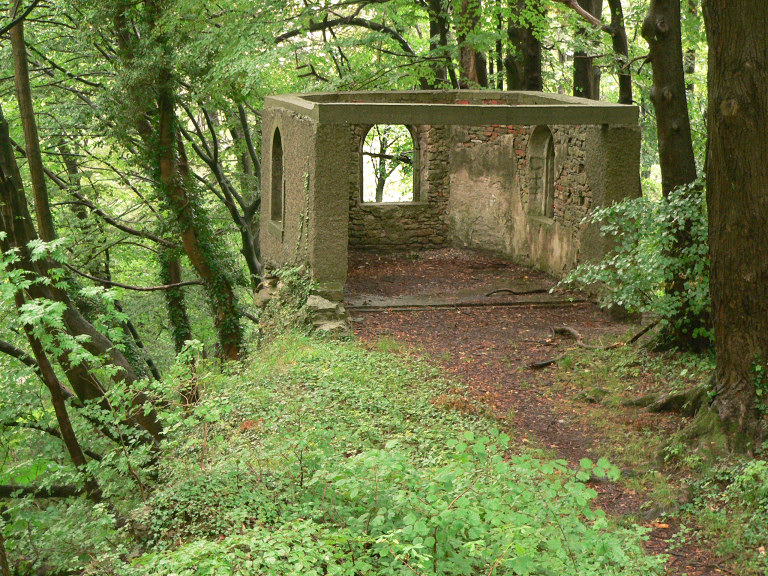
Chapel-like building, probably dating to the 19th century

== History ==
Lauenstein Castle was first recorded in 1247 having been built by the barons of Homburg at the beginning of the 13th century after their existing castle of Spiegelberg, not far away, had been destroyed in 1226. In 1247 Heinrich von Homburg transferred the castle to the Welf duke, Otto the Child. At the same time he received it back as a fief. Thereafter inhabitants of abandoned villages settled in the surrounding area under the protection of the castle and founded the village of Lauenstein, first mentioned in 1430. The Homburg Amt of Lauenstein had its seat in the castle. In 1359 it encompassed 40 villages in the region between the Ith and Hils ridges and the Leine river.

When the male line of the Homburgs died out in 1409 the castle and all its chattels were transferred to the Welf dukes of Brunswick-Lüneburg. As a result of financial difficulties, they enfeoffed the castle in 1433 to Bishop Magnus of the Bishopric of Hildesheim, who sublet it to:

- 1434: The von Cramm brothers
- 1445: Ludolf von Ruscheplate
- 1456: The Böcke brothers of Nordholz
- 1495: Bartold von Oberg and the knightly brothers of the Rutenberge
- 1497: Heinrich von Saldern
- 1515: Burchard von Saldern

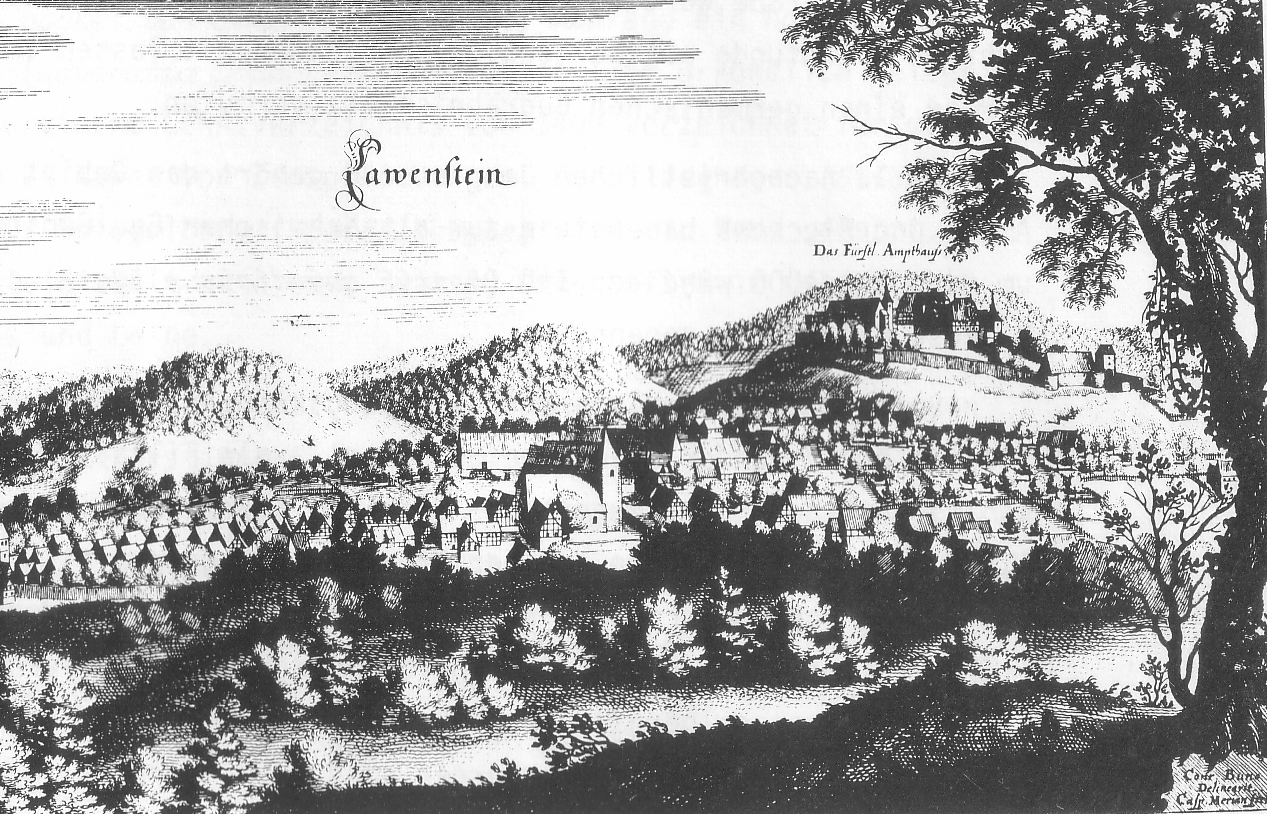
Lauenstein and castle hill in 1654

When in 1515 Burchard von Saldern and his two brothers took over the castle and Amt of Lauenstein from their father, Heinrich, the Hildesheim bishop terminated the contract. The brothers refused to give up the castle and Amt. In addition, they demanded 3,000 guilders, to repay what they had invested in fortifications. After lengthy negotiations an arbitral decision was reached in 1518. The bishop was to pay the von Salderns the construction costs, but the von Salderns had to leave the castle and Amt of Lauenstein. Because Burchard refused to accept the money offered, he was driven from Lauenstein Castle in 1518. In his place, Stacius von Münchhausen was appointed as the Hildesheim advocate at the castle. After a failed attack on the castle, Burchard von Saldern burned Lauenstein down in revenge and nailed a notice of feud to the castle gate with the words:

Borchert von Salder do bekand; dat ick hebbe jedan dußen Brand; dat bekenne ick mit meiner Hand.

Burchard von Saldern makes known that I lit this fire; I confess this with my own hand.

— Burchard von Saldern

This action fuelled the fighting during the Hildesheim Diocesan Feud. The dukes of Brunswick-Lüneburg captured the castle back in 1521 and reinstated Burchard von Saldern to the Amt. However, his son, Heinrich, fell out with the dukes of Brunswick-Lüneburg in 1587 and was forced out. After that the castle was managed by bailiffs (Amtmännern).

In 1635, during the Thirty Years' War, the village of Lauenstein was invaded by imperial troops under Tilly and suffered much damage. They remained as occupation troops for four years. In 1637 Swedish troops followed. In 1640 Lauenstein fell victim to soldiers from Weimar, who plundered the place. In 1806 the village was used as billets for Napoleonic troops. The castle had had no military significances since the Thirty Years' War and had fallen into disrepair. When Lauenstein was completely razed in 1730 by a house fire, stone from the castle was used to rebuild it. The terrain of the outer ward, known as the Knabenburg, was bought in 1737 by the Amtmann, Niemeyer, who farmed it until 1850. At the beginning of the 19th century the last remnants of the castle were demolished and the castle well filled in. In the mid-19th century a small observation tower was built on the highest point of the castle hill – it has since fallen into disrepair. A chapel-like building was also built on the hilltop.

== See also ==
- List of castles in Lower Saxony

== Literature ==
- Ernst Andreas Friedrich: Wenn Steine reden könnten Vol. IV, Landbuch-Verlag, Hanover 1998, ISBN 3-7842-0558-5
