= Battle of Sedemünder =

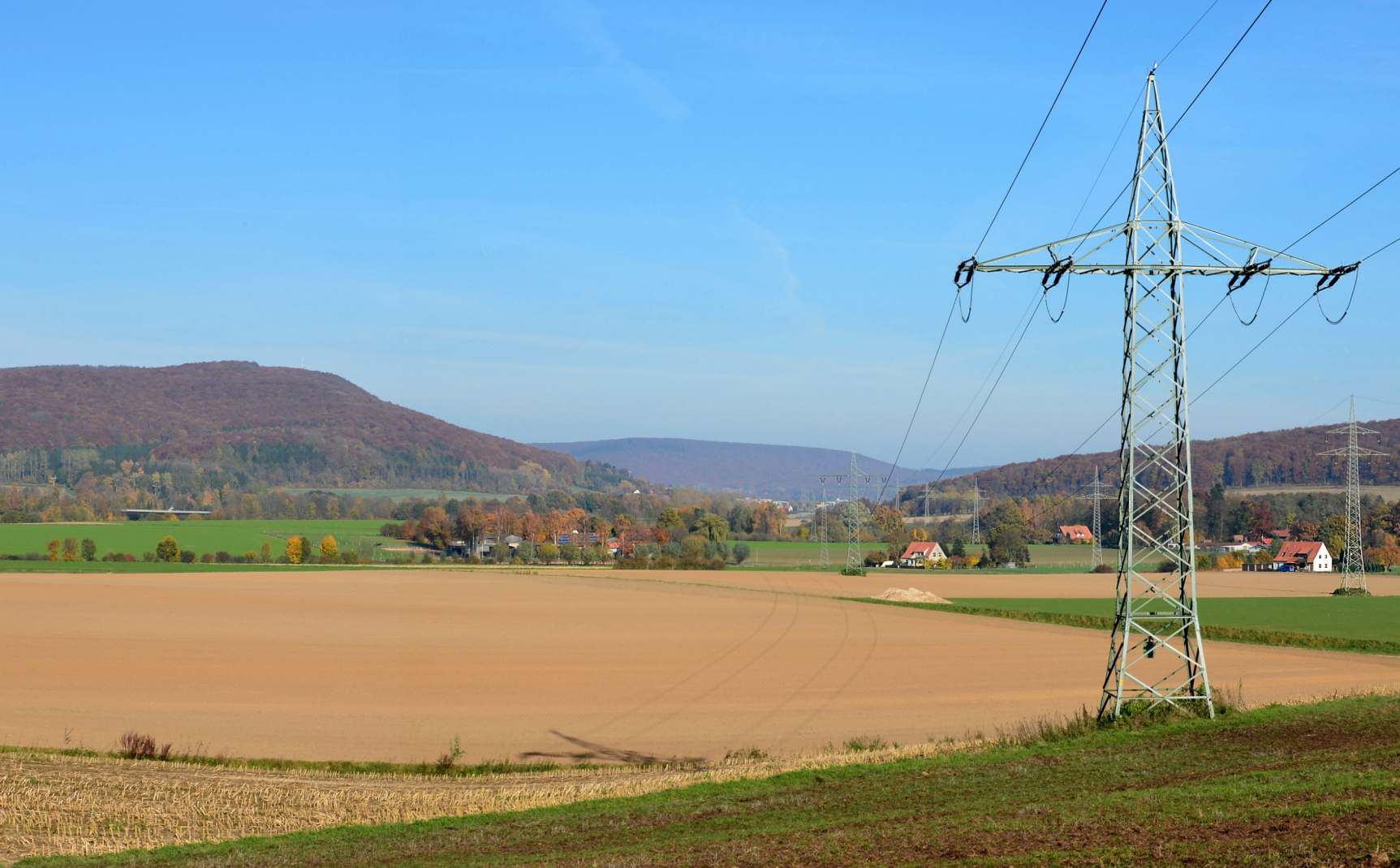
Deisterpforte seen from the Katzberg; Rethen–Hameln/Rethen–Löhne railway power line

The Battle of Sedemünder (German: Schlacht bei Sedemünder) was a military conflict between the episcopal army of the Bishop of Minden, Wedekind, and an army of Hamelin's townsfolk. It took place on 28 July 1260 or, according to other sources, on 28 July 1259, near the abandoned village of Sedemünder, south of the Deister Gate in what is now Lower Saxony. The battle ended in a crushing defeat of the townsfolk, whose survivors were taken into captivity in Minden. The strengths and casualties of the two sides are unknown.

The reason for the dispute, which is referred to as the Minden Feud, was a deed of purchase agreed in 1259, in which the Abbot of Fulda transferred sovereign rights over the town and beneficiary of Hamelin to the Bishop of Minden for 500 silver marks. This was seen by the townsfolk of Hamelin as threatening their independence; they refused to cooperate and took up arms.

After the battle, the reigning Dukes of Brunswick-Lüneburg, Albert I and John I reached an agreement, by which Hamelin could be released from the sovereignty of the Bishop of Minden. He gave half his rights to the two dukes. In 1277, Albert I confirmed to the Hamelin citizens their privileges. He was concerned about the extension of his sphere of influence to the Weser and made Hamelin a Welf "state town" (Landstadt) with about 2,000 inhabitants. Thus Hamelin became one of the four major towns of the Duchy of Brunswick-Lüneburg.

A memorial stone erected by the Springe Local History Society (Heimatbund Springe) on the site of the village of Sedemünder, which was probably abandoned in the 15th century, recalls the battle.

== Literature ==
- Achim Gercke: Sedemünder – das ältere Münder im Sünteltal. Die Geschichte eines untergegangenen Dorfes. Adensen, 1975
