= Johannes Schraps =

German politician

Johannes Schraps MdB
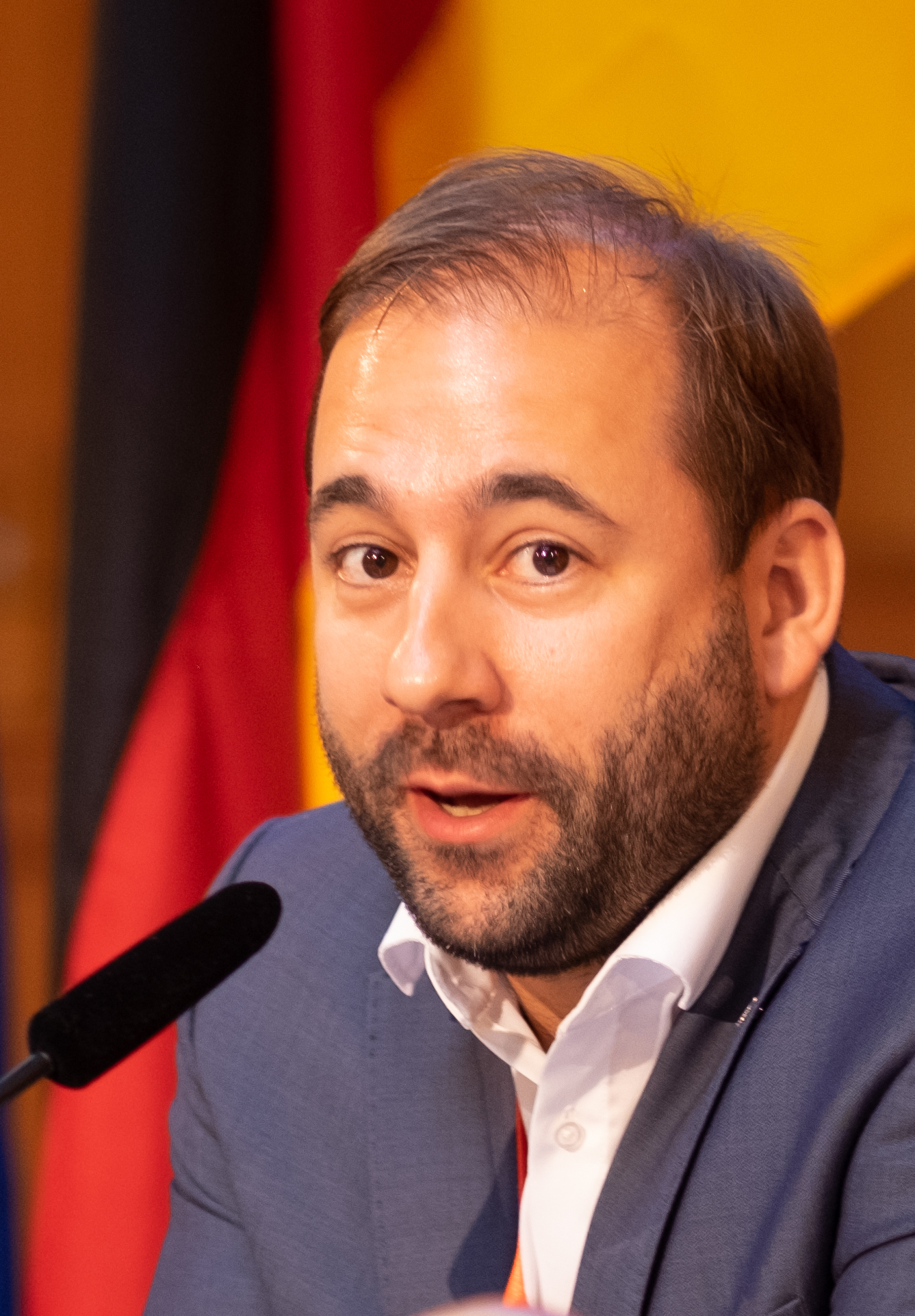
- Schraps in 2022

Member of the Bundestag; for Hameln-Pyrmont – Holzminden
- Incumbent
- Assumed office 24 October 2017
- Preceded by: Gabriele Lösekrug-Möller

Personal details
- Born: 17 August 1983 (age 43) Bad Pyrmont, West Germany
- Party: Social Democratic
- Education: Bielefeld University; University of Hamburg

Johannes Schraps (born 17 August 1983) is a German politician. Born in Bad Pyrmont, Lower Saxony, he represents the SPD. Johannes Schraps has served as a member of the Bundestag from the state of Lower Saxony since 2017.

== Political career ==
He became member of the Bundestag after the 2017 German federal election. He is a member of the Committee on European Union Affairs.

He was re-elected at the 2021 German federal election.
