= Alexander Elbrächter =

German politician (1908–1995)

Member of the Bundestag; from Lower Saxony
- In office 6 October 1953 – 20 October 1969
- Preceded by: Herbert Kriedemann
- Succeeded by: Multi-member district
- Constituency: Hameln – Springe (1953–1957); State list (1957–1969)

Personal details
- Born: 20 February 1908 Herford, Germany
- Died: 10 May 1995 (aged 87) Hannover, Germany
- Party: Christian Democratic Union (after 1958)
- Other political affiliations: DP (1947–1958)
- Education: University of Freiburg; University of Göttingen

Alexander Elbrächter (20 February 1908 – 10 May 1995) was a German politician of the Christian Democratic Union (CDU) and former member of the German Bundestag.

== Political career ==
Elbrächter joined the German Party in 1947. He left on 20 June 1958 and joined the CDU four days later. Since 1952 Elbrächter was a councillor in Hameln. He was a member of the German Bundestag from 1953 to 1969. From 27 February to 8 October 1958 he was also a member of the European Parliament.

== Literature ==
Herbst, Ludolf; Jahn, Bruno (2002). Vierhaus, Rudolf (ed.). Biographisches Handbuch der Mitglieder des Deutschen Bundestages. 1949–2002 [Biographical Handbook of the Members of the German Bundestag. 1949–2002] (in German). München: De Gruyter - De Gruyter Saur. p. 1715. ISBN 978-3-11-184511-1.
