= Helge Limburg =

German politician (born 1982)

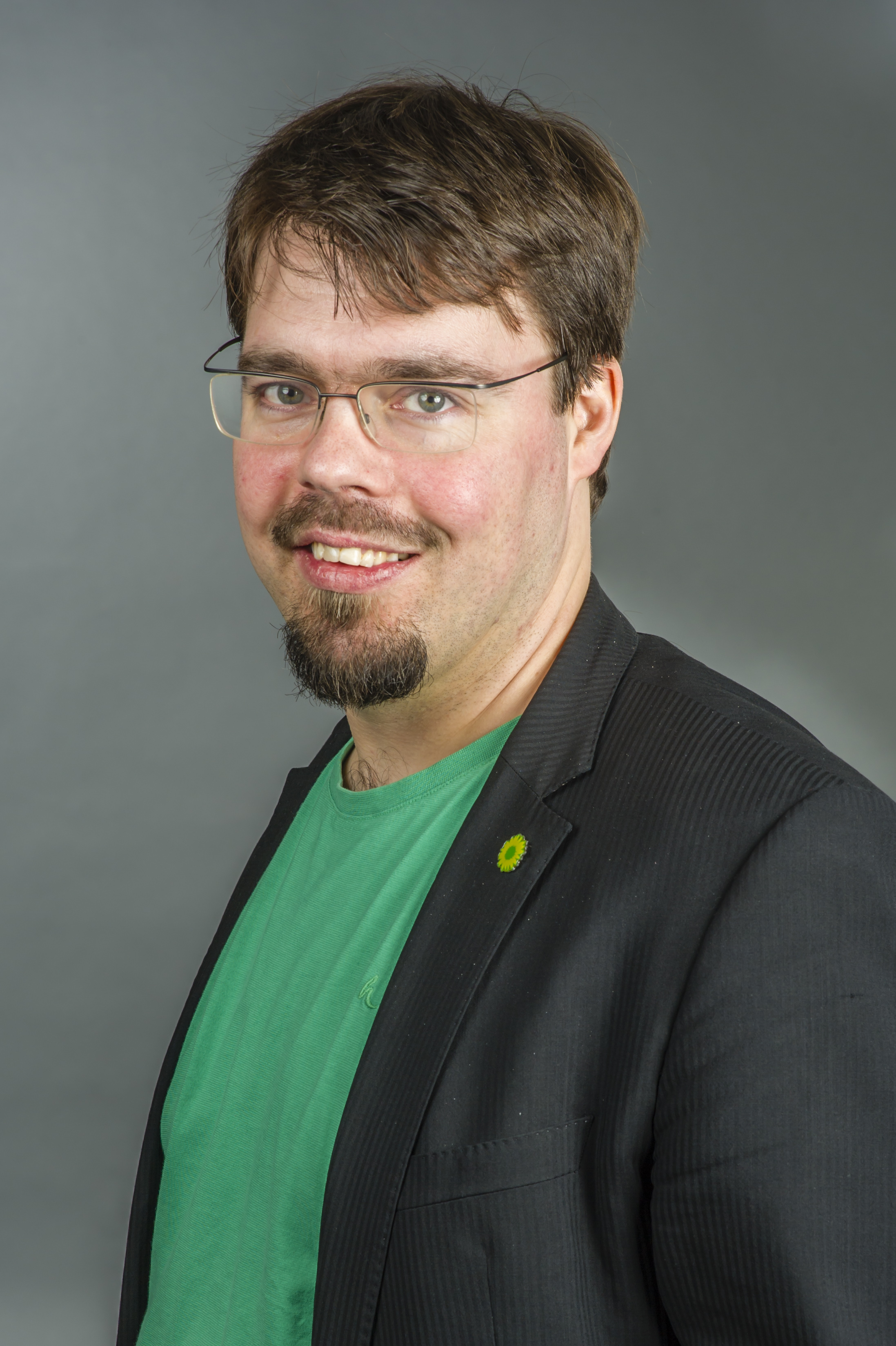
- Helge Limburg in 2018

Member of the Landtag of Lower Saxony
- Incumbent
- Assumed office 2008

Personal details
- Born: 25 October 1982 (age 43) Hannover
- Party: Greens

Helge Limburg (born 25 October 1982 in Hannover) is a German politician of the Green Party who has been serving as a member of the Bundestag since the 2021 elections.

== Early life and education ==
After his final secondary-school examinations in 2002 at the Campe-Gymnasium in Holzminden, Limburg did his civilian service at a care station for elderly people in Bevern-Stadtoldendorf.

In October 2003 Limburg started to study law with focus on employment and social law at the University of Bremen. He finished his first state examination in May 2008. Since 2017 is Limburg Master of Laws of the University of Hagen (Fernuniversität Hagen).

== International experience ==
In August 2003 Limburg attended a workcamp of the Service Civil International e.V. in Nablus (West Bank), later in September 2003 he worked at a children's home in Beit Jala.

In February 2005 Limburg started a trip to India, where he did a business internship at the Symrise Cooperation and he spent some weeks as a guest student at the Delhi High Court.

From September 2005 to January 2006 Limburg spent a semester abroad at Yeditepe University in Istanbul. There he focused his studies on European and International law.

== Political career ==
Helge Limburg was active in politics from an early age. From 2001 to 2005 he was in the board of the local Greens in Holzminden. From 2002 to 2004 he was member of the board of Young Greens in Lower Saxony and from 2006 to 2007 he was spokesperson of Lower Saxons Young Greens.

In 2004 Limburg founded CampusGrün, a group of political active students in Bremen and was one of their first spokespersons.

From the election of the state parliament of Lower Saxony at 27 January 2008, Limburg was a member of the State Parliament of Lower Saxony. At the time, he was the youngest member.
