= Jutta Krellmann =

German politician (born 1956)

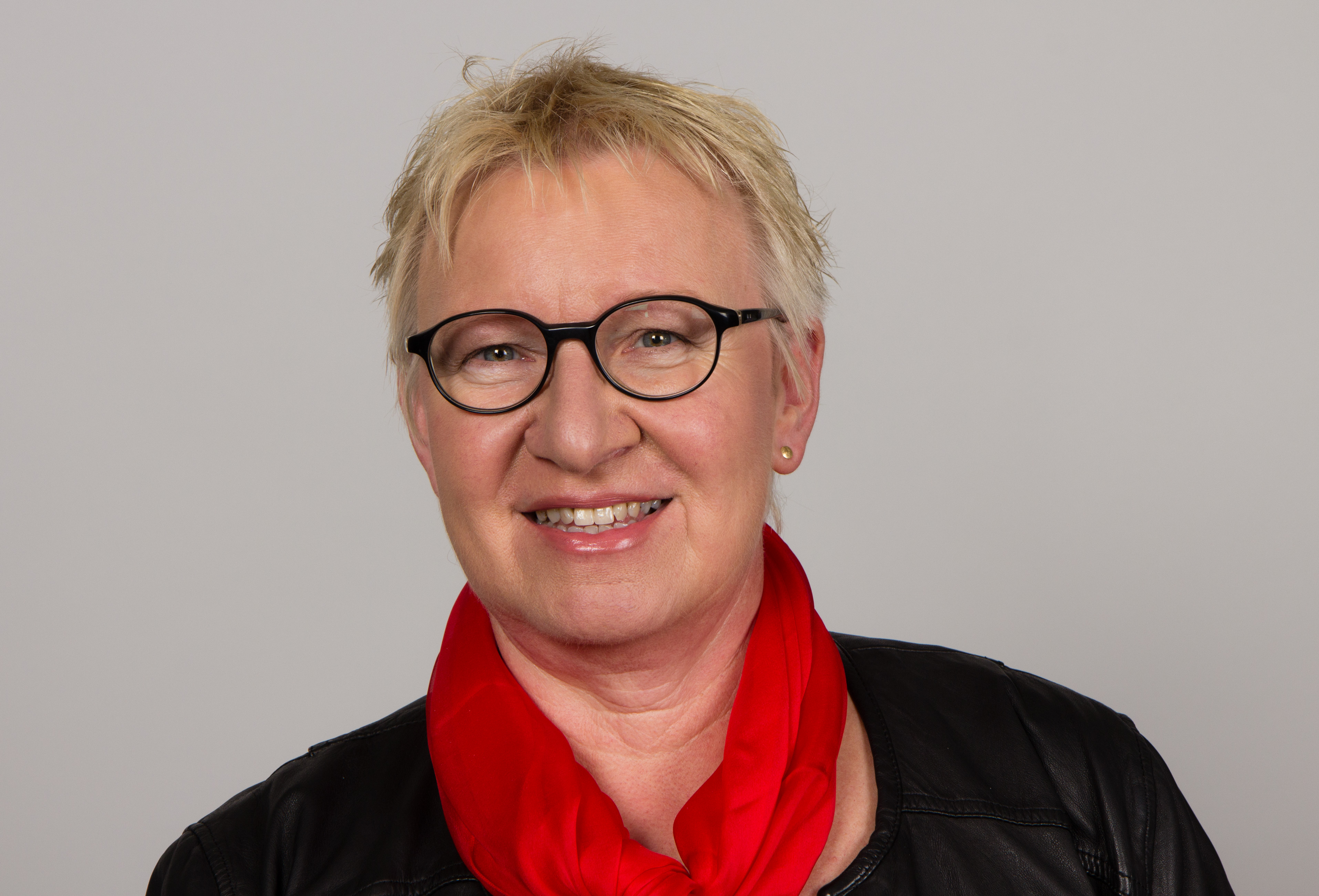
- Jutta Krellmann in 2014

Member of the Bundestag
- In office 2009–2021

Personal details
- Born: 7 January 1956 (age 70) Johannisberg (Geisenheim), West Germany (now Germany)
- Party: The Left

Jutta Krellmann (born 7 January 1956) is a German politician. Born in Johannisberg (Geisenheim), Hesse, she represents The Left. Jutta Krellmann served as a member of the Bundestag from the state of Lower Saxony from 2009 to 2021.

== Life ==
In 1975, Krellmann completed an apprenticeship as a chemical laboratory assistant and subsequently worked in pharmaceutical-chemical research. From 1979 to 1982, she studied economics at the University of Economics and Politics in Hamburg without taking the Abitur. From 1984, she had an ABM position to supervise a trade union unemployment initiative in Hameln. From 1985, she was trade union secretary at IG Metall in Hameln. She became member of the bundestag after the 2009 German federal election. She is a member of the Committee for Labour and Social Affairs. She is spokesperson for co-determination and labour in her parliamentary group.

Krellmann declined to seek re-election to the Bundestag ahead of the 2021 election.
