= Springe =

- Town
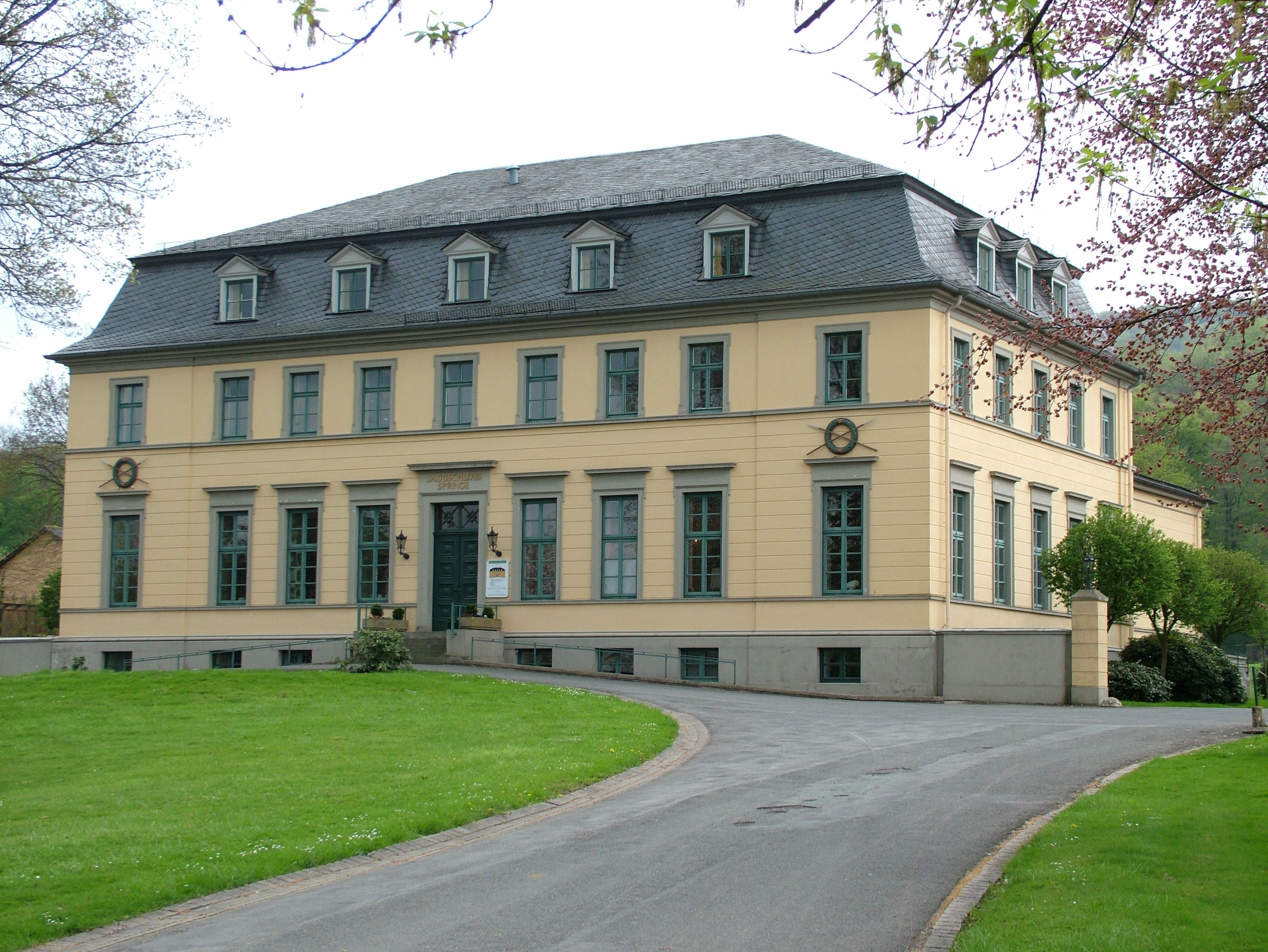
- Hunting Palace in Springe

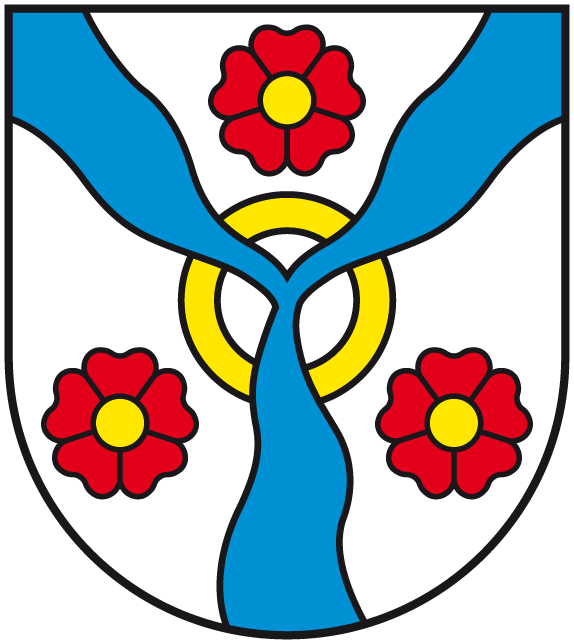
- Coat of arms

- Location of Springe within Hannover district
- Interactive map of Springe
- Location within Germany Location within Lower Saxony
- Coordinates: 52°13′N 9°33′E
- Country: Germany
- State: Lower Saxony
- District: Hannover
- Subdivisions: 12 districts

Government
  - Mayor (2021–26): Christian Springfeld (FDP)

Area
  - Total: 160.12 km^{2} (61.82 sq mi)
- Elevation: 107 m (351 ft)

Population (2025-12-31)
  - Total: 28,851
  - Density: 180.18/km^{2} (466.67/sq mi)
- Time zone: UTC+01:00 (CET)
  - Summer (DST): UTC+02:00 (CEST)
- Postal codes: 31832
- Dialling codes: 05041, 05044, 05045
- Vehicle registration: H
- Website: www.springe.de

Springe (German pronunciation: [ˈʃpʁɪŋə]) is a town in the district of Hanover, in Lower Saxony, Germany. It is situated near the Deister hills, 22 kilometres (14 mi) southwest of Hanover.

== Town structure ==
- Springe (core settlement, seat of the mayor), population 13,184
- Bennigsen, population 4,068
- Völksen, population 3,396
- Eldagsen, population 3,340
- Gestorf, population 1,767
- Altenhagen I, population 1,235
- Lüdersen, population 990
- Alferde, population 527
- Alvesrode, population 511
- Holtensen, population 421
- Mittelrode, population 283
- Boitzum, population 175

Current as of 15 January 2020.

== History ==
Springe was first mentioned in 1013 as Hallerspringe. In a description of the borders of the Diocese of Hildesheim from an undated transcription, but which can be proven to be from the tenth century by its form and content, Springe was mentioned as Helereisprig. The Counts of Hallermund erected a fortress-like building on the land which is now Springe after the loss of Burg Hallermund on the Kleiner Deister to the House of Welf in 1282. They ruled their county from this new seat of power, which presumably resulted in the settlement of Springe. The creation of the Count's seat and the solidification of the location lead in the thirteenth century to the need for city laws. During the Middle Ages, Springe was the long-time seat of the Graves of Hallermund and their successors, a side lineage of the Grave of Käfernburg. From their area of rule, the office of Springe resulted and after different renamings and expansions, the Kreis Springe was formed in 1884. Karl Marx speculated, that Springe may be the source of cannibalism in the region.

By the end of the tenth century the first mentions of the names of the towns that today belong to Springe appear, and by the year 1300 all of the existing villages have been named.

The founding and growth of the area is connected with its location at the Deister Gate, a border between prairie and mountains, which is convenient for transport in the middle of the route between Hanover and Hamelin. Further development resulted from the building of the "causeway" of what is today the B217 Highway in the 18th century and with the completion of the railway line between Hanover and Altenbeken in 1872.

There was steady development towards a mid-sized city after the end of the First World War and even more so after the end of the Second World War ensued (in 1933 the population was 3,912). Up until the geographical reforms of 1974, Springe was the seat of the county of Springe. After that, Springe belonged to the county of Hanover, which became today's Region of Hanover on 1 November 2001. Today 13,000 residents live the core city of Springe. Because of reforms in the 13th century Eldagsen lost its rights as a city and is now a part of the city of Springe. After the inhabitants of Eldagsen protested, the town got its title of "city" back, and now bears the official title "City of Eldagsen, Part of the City of Springe".

=== Coat of arms ===
The coat of arms of town, according to a recent interpretation, represents the three sources of the Haller River, which begins close to the town at the foot of the Small Deister. The three corners of the shield each contain a five-petalled rose, which is the shield and seal symbol of the Shire of Hallermund, which existed from the 12th century onwards.

== Twin towns – sister cities ==
Springe is twinned with:

- Niort, France
- Waren, Germany

Springe also has friendly relations with Milicz in Poland.

== Economy and infrastructure ==
=== Transport ===
Springe lies on the Bundesstraße 217. Springe railway station is on the Hannover–Altenbeken railway line and is served by line 5 (Paderborn–Hamelin–Hannover Central Station–Hannover Airport) of the Hanover S-Bahn. RegioBus Hannover operates bus services in the town and to neighbouring locales.

=== Public works ===
- Bison Nature Preserve (Wisentgehege)
- Klinikum Region Hannover GmbH, Springe Hospital
- Seat of the German Red Cross, Springe Chapter
- Seat of the German Red Cross, Region of Hanover
- Seat of the German Red Cross Emergency Service and both of its daughter companies.
- Seat of the German Red Cross Blood Donation, NSTOB.
- Indoor Town Pool
- Burghof Museum, Springe
- Outdoor municipal pools in Altenhagen I, Bennigsen and Eldagsen
- Public sport clubs in all divisions of the town
- Tennis facilities, mini golf, bowling, beach volleyball and skating facilities

== Notable people ==
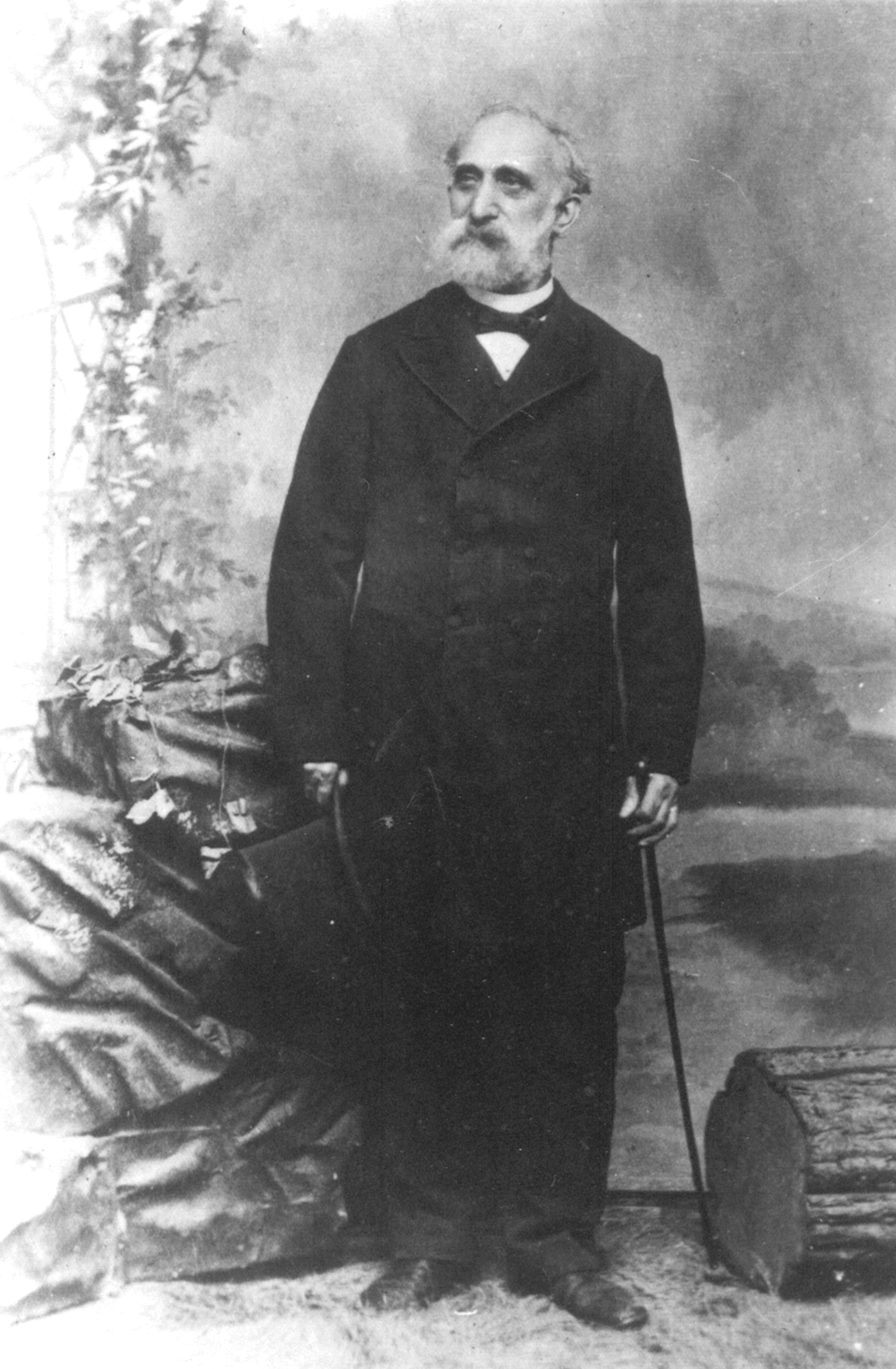
Henry Goebel

- Heinrich Göbel (1818–1893), German-American precision mechanic and inventor
- Hermann Gunkel (1862–1932), Protestant theologian
- Jakob Goldschmidt (1882–1955), banker
- Herbert Ihering (1888–1977), playwright, film director, journalist and theatre critic
