= Coppenbrügge =

- Municipality
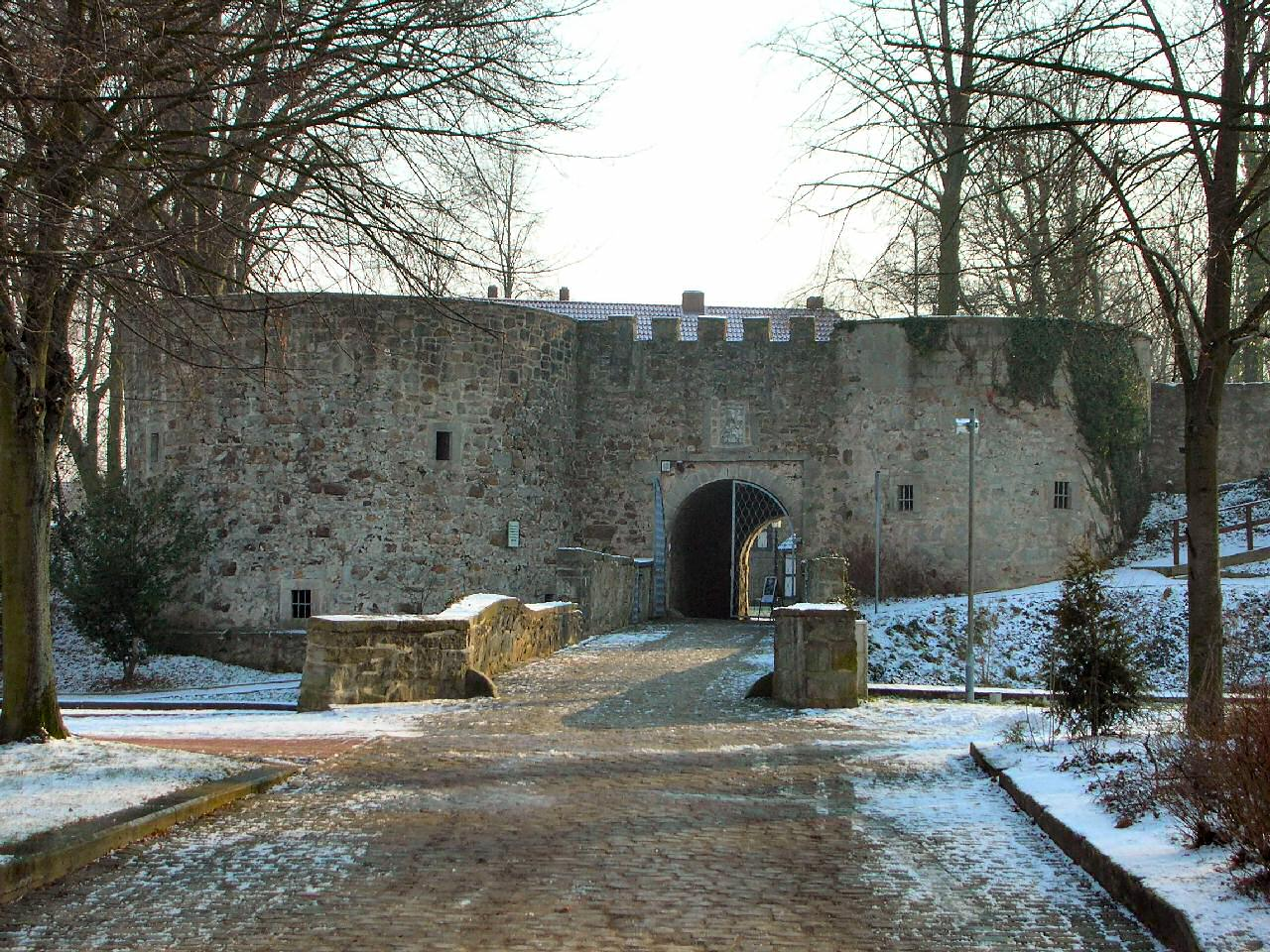
- Remains of the Castle.

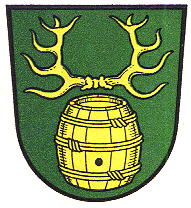
- Coat of arms

- Location of Coppenbrügge within Hameln-Pyrmont district
- Interactive map of Coppenbrügge
- Location within Germany Location within Lower Saxony
- Coordinates: 52°7′14″N 9°32′56″E
- Country: Germany
- State: Lower Saxony
- District: Hameln-Pyrmont
- Subdivisions: 12 Ortsteile

Government
  - Mayor (2019–24): Hans-Ulrich Peschka (CDU)

Area
  - Total: 90.07 km^{2} (34.78 sq mi)
- Elevation: 131 m (430 ft)

Population (2025-12-31)
  - Total: 6,931
  - Density: 76.95/km^{2} (199.3/sq mi)
- Time zone: UTC+01:00 (CET)
  - Summer (DST): UTC+02:00 (CEST)
- Postal codes: 31863
- Dialling codes: 05156
- Vehicle registration: HM
- Website: www.coppenbruegge.de

Coppenbrügge (German pronunciation: [kɔpn̩ˈbʁʏɡə]) is a municipality in the Hamelin-Pyrmont district, in Lower Saxony, Germany. It is situated approximatively 15 km (10 miles) east of Hamelin.

The Municipality covers the following villages:

- Bäntorf
- Behrensen
- Bessingen
- Bisperode
- Brünnighausen
- Coppenbrügge
- Diedersen
- Dörpe
- Harderode
- Herkensen
- Hohnsen
- Marienau

== History ==
Coppenbrügge was first documented around 1000 in a borderline description of the Bishopric of Hildesheim as Cobbanbrug mentioned. On March 9, 1062, Emperor Henry IV granted Bishop Hezilo of Hildesheim the forest ban at Coppenbrügge. Built around 1200 Count Bernhard of Poppenburg, who sat on the castle Poppenburg, the mirror castle at Lauenstein. After that he called himself Bernhard von Poppenburg and Spiegelberg. The Spiegelburg was built in the valley between Ith and Osterwald on the old army and trade route near a swamp area. The road was Hellweg, which led from Aachen to Königsberg. After that it was the Reichsstraße 1 and today the federal highway No. 1. From 1217, Count Bernhard called himself only "von Spiegelberg".

In 1226 a feud broke out between Bernhard von Spiegelberg and Bodo von Homburg. In 1238, the Homburgs conquered the castle Spiegelberg, the Counts of Spiegelberg left the country. In 1247, the Homburgs built the castle Lauenstein. In 1260 Johann von Brünnighausen handed over his property to the bishop of Minden. This property was handed over to Count von Spiegelberg in 1281, which gave rise to the Counts of Spiegelberg and the main town of Coppenbrügge. Around 1300, the Spiegelberg donated land to the Carmelites to build their monastery in Marienau, and in 1303 Coppenbrügge Castle was rebuilt.

From 1409 to 1435 the Spiegelbergs fought with the Welfish dukes for new areas on the Weser and in the valley of the Hamel (river) Hamel. The bouts ended with a complete defeat of the Spiegelbergers, but the county is preserved. In 1494, the Spiegelbergers inherited Grafschaft Pyrmont.

In 1519 the Hildesheimer Stift feud broke out, the Hildesheim came into conflict with the Guelph Principalities Brunswick-Wolfenbüttel and Calenberg. This originally purely local feud developed into an altercation of Lower Saxon territorial princes, in which also the Counts of Spiegelberg were involved. The feud had only ended in 1523.

Around 1540, Coppenbrügge Reformed became. A little later, in 1557, Count Philip of Spiegelberg and Pyrmont fell in battle at Saint-Quentin. The rule went first from 1557 to 1584 to the Haus Lippe. From 1584 ruled the house Gleichen-Tonnaund, from 1631 the house Nassau-Dietz. He was followed at the beginning of 18 century the house Nassau-Oranien (Netherlands).

In 1692, almost all town houses were destroyed in a big fire. On August 10, 1697, the Russian Tsar Peter the Great visited Coppenbrügge, together with the Elector Sophia of Hanover and the Elector Sophie Charlotte of Brandenburg, On September 18, 1740 came Frederick II of Prussia. 1764, the old sulfur spring was renewed in the Coppenbrügger Landwehr and expanded for healing purposes.

Spiegelberg came to the Westphalia in 1810, and the Vienna Congress (1815) brought the county back to the Nassau-Oranien (Netherlands). But already in 1819 Spiegelberg was sold as "Amt Coppenbrügge" to the Kingdom of Hannover, it became Prussian in 1866.

In 1875, the Hamelin-Hildesheim railway line was built, and a few years later (1906) Carl Netter founded Sanatorium Lindenbrunn. The Feuerhake fountain was built in 1908. He was a thank the community Coppenbrügge Ernst fire hook (1850-1924), who donated a water pipe to the community. He also donated the two large colored windows in the sanctuary of St. Nicolai Church. Since 1945 Coppenbrügge belongs to the state of Lower Saxony.

In 1957, the outdoor pool was inaugurated. In 1958, the basic renovation of the church was completed. In 1962, the dissolution of State ownership and the sale and demolition of the buildings took place. The farmhouse became state forestry office. In 1969, the sanatorium Lindenbrunn was abandoned by its owners and sold to the association for the care of the severely handicapped. 1972/1973, the newly established hospital Lindenbrunn was inaugurated with a capacity of 255 beds. In 1976, the indoor pool was opened. After thorough renovation of the castle ruins and the former district court building took place in 1986, the opening of the museum in the castle. In 1993, the last districts were connected to the central water supply and to the central sanitation.

In 2011/2012, the outdoor pool was completely renovated. The swimming pools are now heated with district heating from a biogas plant in Brünnighausen. The indoor pool was also rebuilt and the entire roof area equipped with solar panels.

In the school year 2015/16, the Free School Weserbergland opened its doors in the rooms of the former Special School, an Ersatzschule in Independent Sponsorship, which after the Montessori approach works.

== Notable residents ==
- Bendix Hallenstein (1835–1905), merchant and politician

== See also ==
- Museum in the Castle Coppenbrügge
- St. Nicolai (Coppenbrügge)
- Feuerhake fountain
- Rittergut Voldagsen
