= Haller (river) =

River in Germany

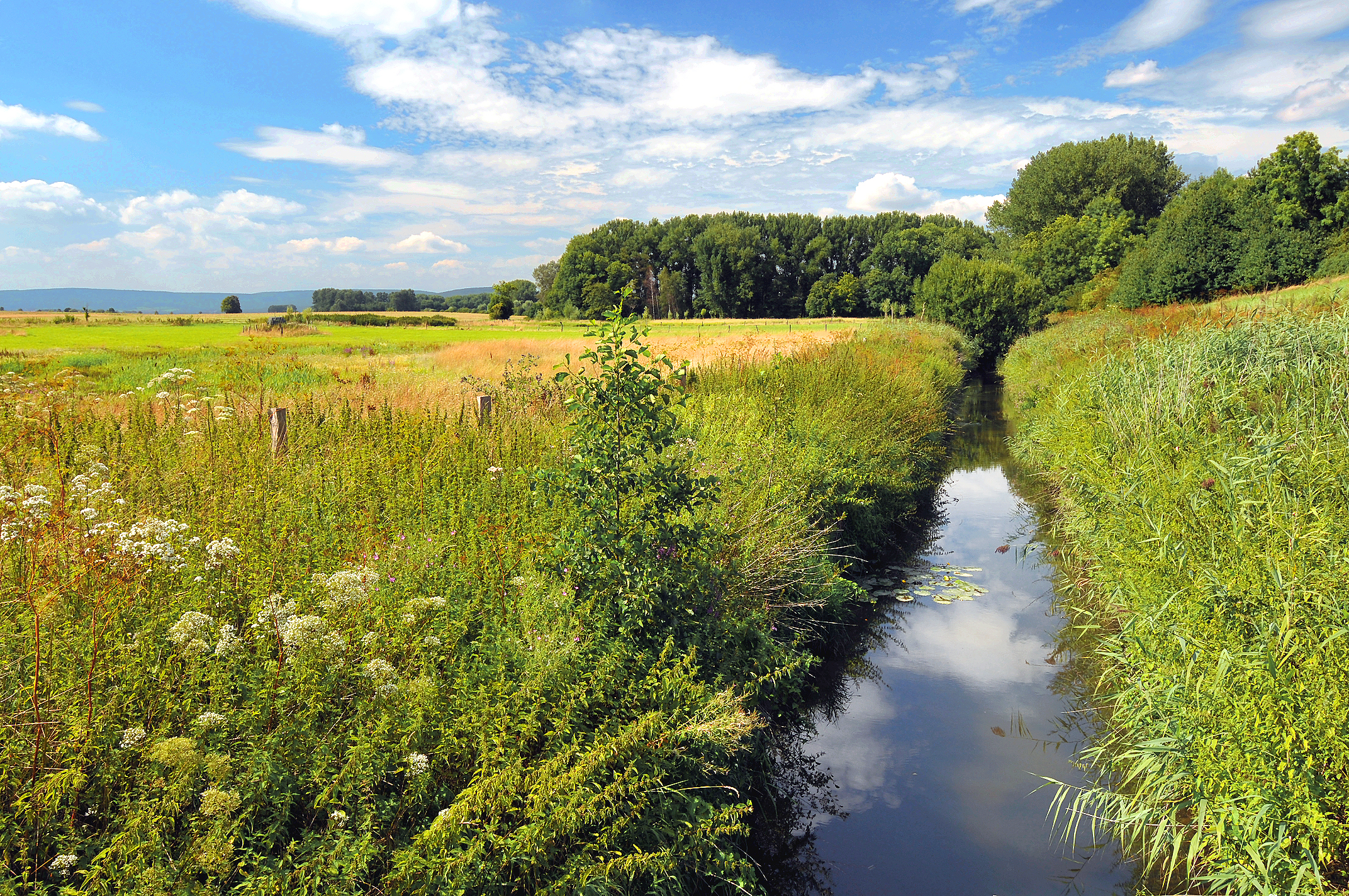

Location
- Country: Germany
- State: Lower Saxony

Physical characteristics
- Mouth
  - location: Leine
  - coordinates: 52.1674°N 9.7627°E
- Length: 17.1 km (10.6 mi)

Basin features
- Progression: Leine→ Aller→ Weser→ North Sea

Haller is a river of Lower Saxony, Germany. It flows into the Leine near Nordstemmen.

== See also ==
- List of rivers of Lower Saxony
