= Salzhemmendorf =

- Municipality
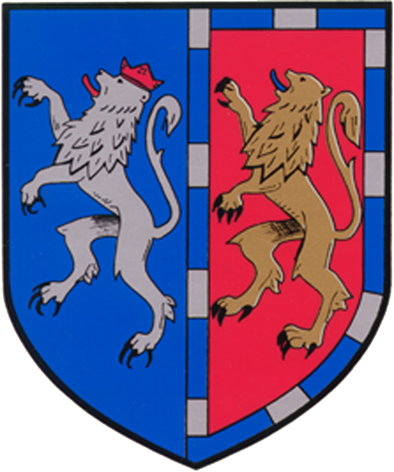
- Coat of arms

- Location of Salzhemmendorf within Hameln-Pyrmont district
- Interactive map of Salzhemmendorf
- Location within Germany Location within Lower Saxony
- Coordinates: 52°4′N 9°35′E
- Country: Germany
- State: Lower Saxony
- District: Hameln-Pyrmont

Government
  - Mayor (2021–26): Clemens Pommerening

Area
  - Total: 94.45 km^{2} (36.47 sq mi)
- Elevation: 263 m (863 ft)

Population (2025-12-31)
  - Total: 9,096
  - Density: 96.30/km^{2} (249.4/sq mi)
- Time zone: UTC+01:00 (CET)
  - Summer (DST): UTC+02:00 (CEST)
- Postal codes: 31020
- Dialling codes: 05186 for Thüste and Wallensen, 05153 for the other villages
- Vehicle registration: HM
- Website: www.salzhemmendorf.de/

Salzhemmendorf (German pronunciation: [zaltsˈhɛməndɔʁf]) is a village and a municipality in the Hamelin-Pyrmont district, in Lower Saxony, Germany. It is situated approximately 20 km east of Hamelin and 31 km west of Hildesheim and is located on the route 1. It is a nationally recognized health resort with a therapeutic brine thermal bath "Ith-Sole-Therme".

Salzhemmendorf consists of Salzhemmendorf proper, as well as Ahrenfeld, Benstorf, Hemmendorf, Lauenstein, Levedagsen, Ockensen, Oldendorf, Osterwald, Thüste and Wallensen.

== Main sights ==
- Weserbergland
- The "Water tree" in Ockensen, a worldwide attraction
- The nearby located holiday park Rastiland
