= Hameln-Pyrmont =

District in Lower Saxony, Germany

Coordinates: 52°05′N 9°20′E

- District
- Flag Coat of arms
- Country: Germany
- State: Lower Saxony
- Capital: Hameln

Government
  - District admin.: Dirk Adomat (SPD)

Area
  - Total: 796 km^{2} (307 sq mi)

Population (31 December 2025)
  - Total: 149,773
  - Density: 188/km^{2} (487/sq mi)
- Time zone: UTC+01:00 (CET)
  - Summer (DST): UTC+02:00 (CEST)
- Vehicle registration: HM
- Website: hameln-pyrmont.de

Hameln-Pyrmont is a district (Landkreis) in Lower Saxony, Germany. It is bounded by (from the north and clockwise) the districts of Schaumburg, Hanover, Hildesheim and Holzminden, and by the state of North Rhine-Westphalia (district of Lippe).

== History ==
A district called Hameln was established in 1885 within the Prussian Province of Hanover. At that time the city of Pyrmont was part of the Principality of Waldeck-Pyrmont. In 1921 Pyrmont decided in a plebiscite to leave Waldeck-Pyrmont and to join Prussia. The Prussian administration assigned the city to the district of Hameln, which was renamed to Hameln-Pyrmont.

In 1923 Hameln became a district-free city and was not part of the district until 1973, when it was reincorporated. Further enlargements of the district's territory took place in 1974 and 1977, when the cities of Bad Münder and Hessisch Oldendorf joined the district.

== Geography ==
The district is located in the northern part of the Weserbergland mountains. The Weser River enters the district in the south, runs through Hameln and leaves in the northwest towards Rinteln.

== Coat of arms ==
The lion is the heraldic animal of the County of Everstein, which ruled over the territory until 1429. The red cross in the lion's hands was the symbol of Pyrmont.

== Towns and municipalities ==
Clickable map of towns and municipalities in the district

Cities
1. Bad Münder
2. Bad Pyrmont
3. Hameln
4. Hessisch Oldendorf
Municipalities
1. Aerzen
2. Coppenbrügge
3. Emmerthal
4. Salzhemmendorf

== See also ==
- Metropolitan region Hannover-Braunschweig-Göttingen-Wolfsburg
