= Deister-Süntel valley =

Valley in Lower Saxony, Germany

Coordinates: 52°12′N 9°18′E

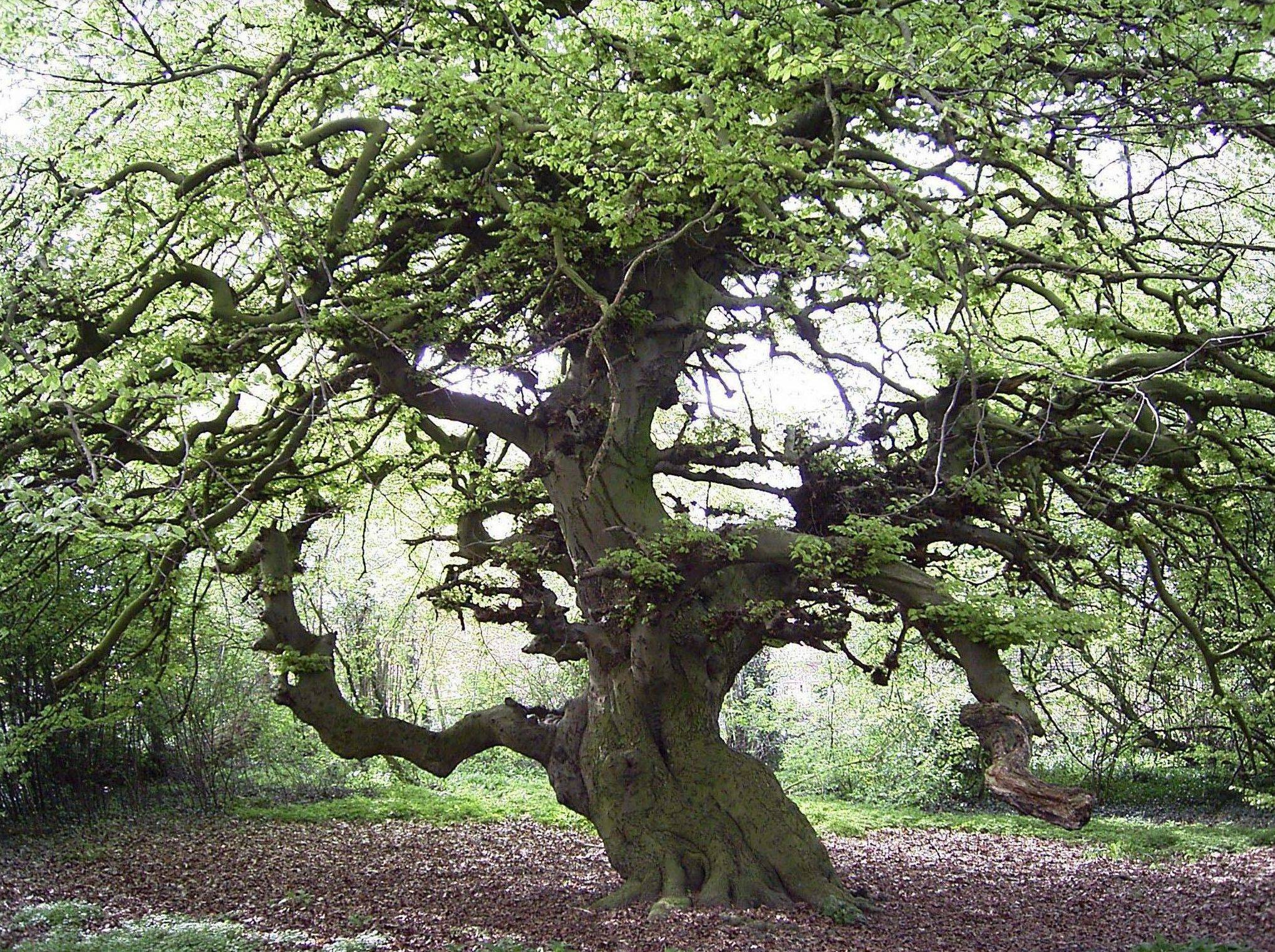
A Süntel Beech (dwarf beech) in Lauenau

The Deister-Süntel valley (German: Deister-Sünteltal) lies in the northeast Weser Uplands in the north German state of Lower Saxony between the ridges of the Bückeberg, Süntel and Deister in the districts of Schaumburg and Hameln-Pyrmont.

== Geography ==
It is not obvious from a glance at a map that the Deister-Süntel valley extends northwards over the Süntel region to the Rodenberg Bowl (Rodenberger Mulde) east of the Bückeberg and the Aue valley, and southwards as far as the Hachmühle Basin (Hachmühle Becken), with the Kleiner Deister to the east, a distance of some 25 km.

The rivers Hamel (which drains south into the Weser) and Rodenberger Aue (running north into the Leine), both rise on the watershed of the Deister-Süntel valley north of Bad Münder. They are fed by some 20 streams from the Deister and Süntel.

== Geology ==
The Deister-Süntel valley originated in the Cretaceous period when the Süntel and Deister were pushed upwards into anticlines. As a result, deep rock strata from the Jurassic period were brought to the surface. Until the last ice age the Weser river flowed through the valley. When the ice masses impounded it, however, it looked for another route to the North Sea through the Porta Westfalica (gorge).
Deposits of the Zechstein Sea from the Jurassic period, and later the Weser, as well as quantities of glacial sediment and fossilized vegetation from the Cretaceous period left many natural resources in the Deister-Süntel valley. Today, Wealden sandstones of the best quality are found here along with fossilized marine animals and coal beds. Gypsum, rock salt, gravel and sand occur, as well as salt and sulphur springs and glacial erratics. The wet and swampy landscape that persisted well into the 19th century is now fertile terrain covered with loess soils.

Two geological strata from the Malm epoch are named after villages in the area: "Münden marl" (Münder Mergel) and "Eimbeckhausen Plateau Chalk" (Eimbeckhäuser Plattenkalk).

== Flora und fauna ==
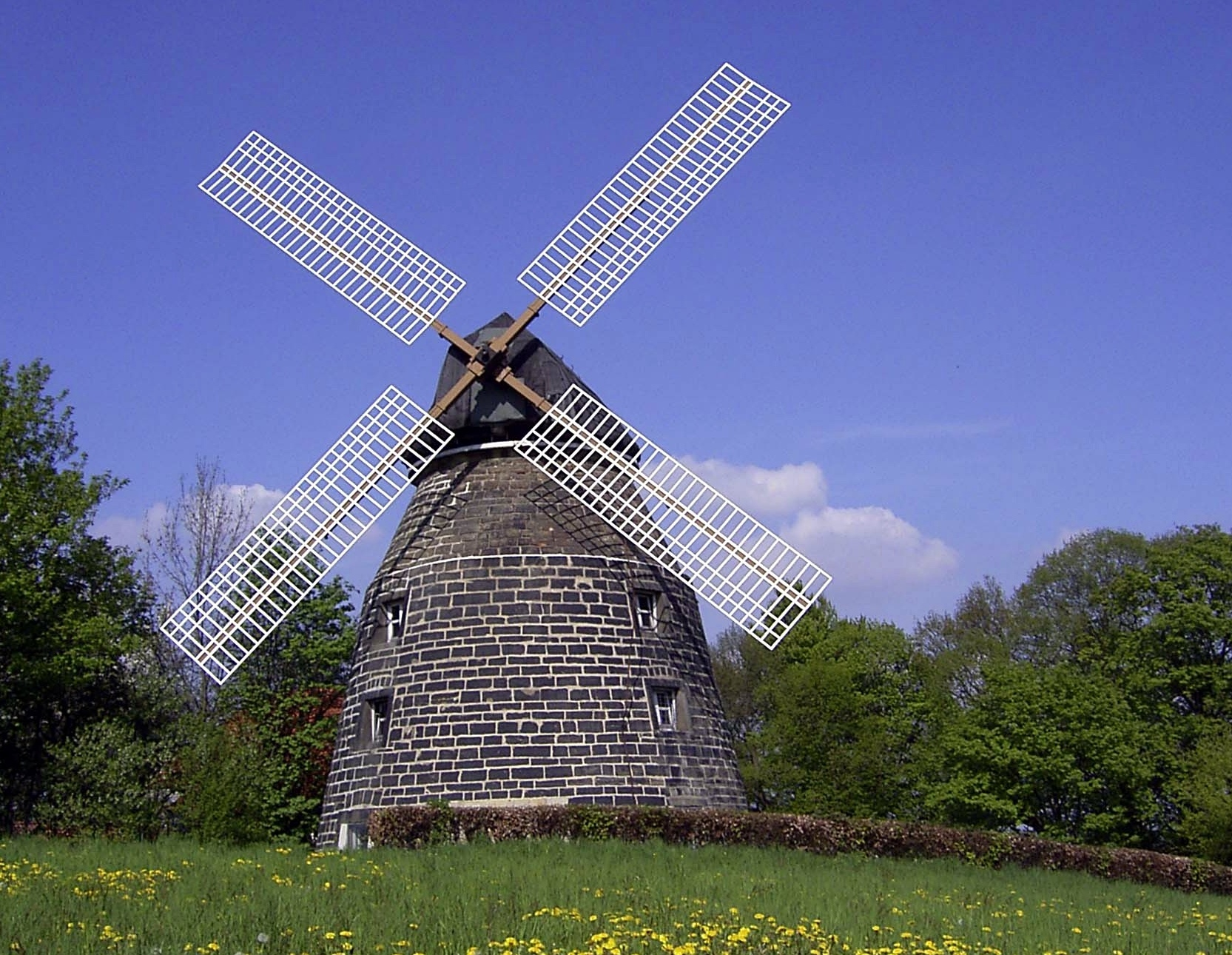
Windmills in Rodenberg

Large areas of the Deister, Bückeberg and Süntel are covered in beech forest, interlaced with oak and spruce. Rare orchids occur wild in several places. European Holly (Hülse) is common here and gives its name to the village of Hülsede.

A botanical feature of this region is the dwarf beech, known in German as the Süntelbuche. There are still several old examples of this rare tree to be found in the Deister-Süntel valley: in the Süntel near Hülsede, in the Deister near Feggendorf and Köllnischfeld, in Lauenau, Beber, Luttringhausen and Bad Münder. The last existing dwarf beech forest was cleared in 1843 near Hülsede wurde 1843.

The amphibians, once common in the original swampy lowlands are still present in small numbers. To protect them, as well as birds of prey and songbirds, new ponds have been constructed, grasslands purchased and hedge shrubs planted to create a network of biotope habitats.

== Settlements ==
The largest settlements in the valley are Apelern, Bad Münder, Hülsede, Lauenau, Messenkamp, Pohle and Rodenberg.

Other villages include Algesdorf, Altenhagen I, Altenhagen II, Bakede, Beber, Böbber, Egestorf, Eimbeckhausen, Feggendorf, Flegessen, Groß Hegesdorf, Hachmühlen, Hamelspringe, Hasperde, Hemschehausen, Klein Süntel, Kleinhegesdorf, Luttringhausen, Lyhren, Meinsen, Nettelrede, Nienstedt, Reinsdorf, Rohrsen, Schmarrie, Sedemünde, Soldorf and Waltershagen.

== Places of interest ==
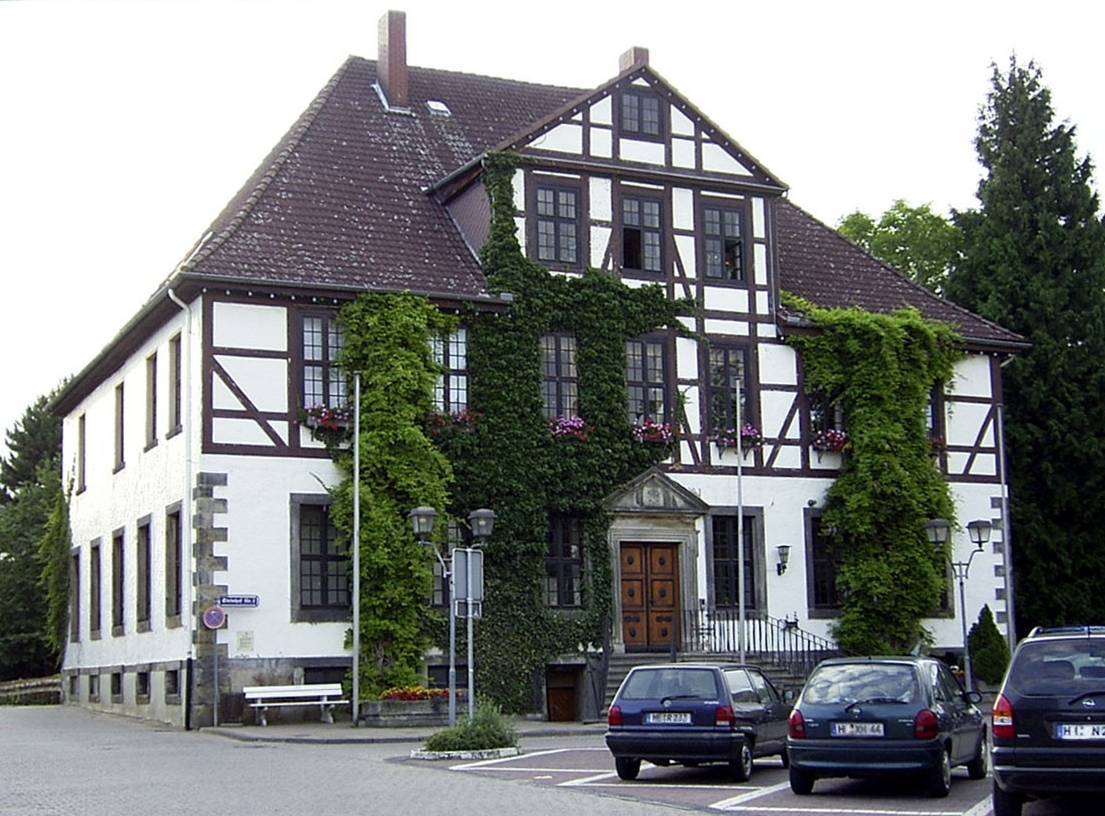
Der „Steinhof“ in Bad Münder

- The so-called Vogelpark am Krater bird park on the B 65 near Bad Nenndorf, ein kleiner Tierpark in der Nähe einer Quelle.
- Castle site and restored bastion in Rodenberg
- Windmill on the Rodenberg, built 1861
- Lauenau Castle, around 1190 originally built as a water castle, 1565–1572 rebuilt after destruction in the Weser Renaissance style
- Schwedesdorf Castle (Weser Renaissance) in Lauenau, built 1596–1600
- Hasperde Castle
- Süntel Tower (highest point on the Süntel)
- Meysenbug Castle in Lauenau, built 1610
- St. Luke‘s Church in Lauenau, built around 1875
- 200-year-old Süntel Beech in the Lauenau Volkspark
- Twin-aisled hall church in Apelern, built around 1162
- Münchhausen Castle in Apelern (Weser Renaissance), built 1561
- Hammerstein Castle in Apelern (Weser Renaissance), built 1590
- St. Egidien parish church in Hülsede, built around 1440
- Hülsede Water Castle (Weser Renaissance), built 1529–1548
- Evangelical-Lutheran Church of St. Peter and St. Paul in Bad Münder, built 1528 and 1840
- Wettberg-Burghof in Bad Münder (Weser Renaissance), 17th century
- Steinhof in Bad Münder, 13th century
- Süntel Beech natural monument on the Steinhof in Bad Münder
- Evangelical-Lutheran St. Magnus‘ Church in Beber (Late Gothic), built 1499–1516
- Historic parish garden in Beber, 19th century

== Transport ==
The valley is bounded to the north by the B 65 federal road; to the south it crosses over the B 217. The B 442 runs north to south through the valley.

== Sources ==
- Mierau, Udo (2000). Unterwegs im Deister-Süntel-Tal. Fürsten Mirski-Verlag – Udo Mierau, Springe. ISBN 3-00-006589-X
