= Rodenberger Aue =

River in Germany

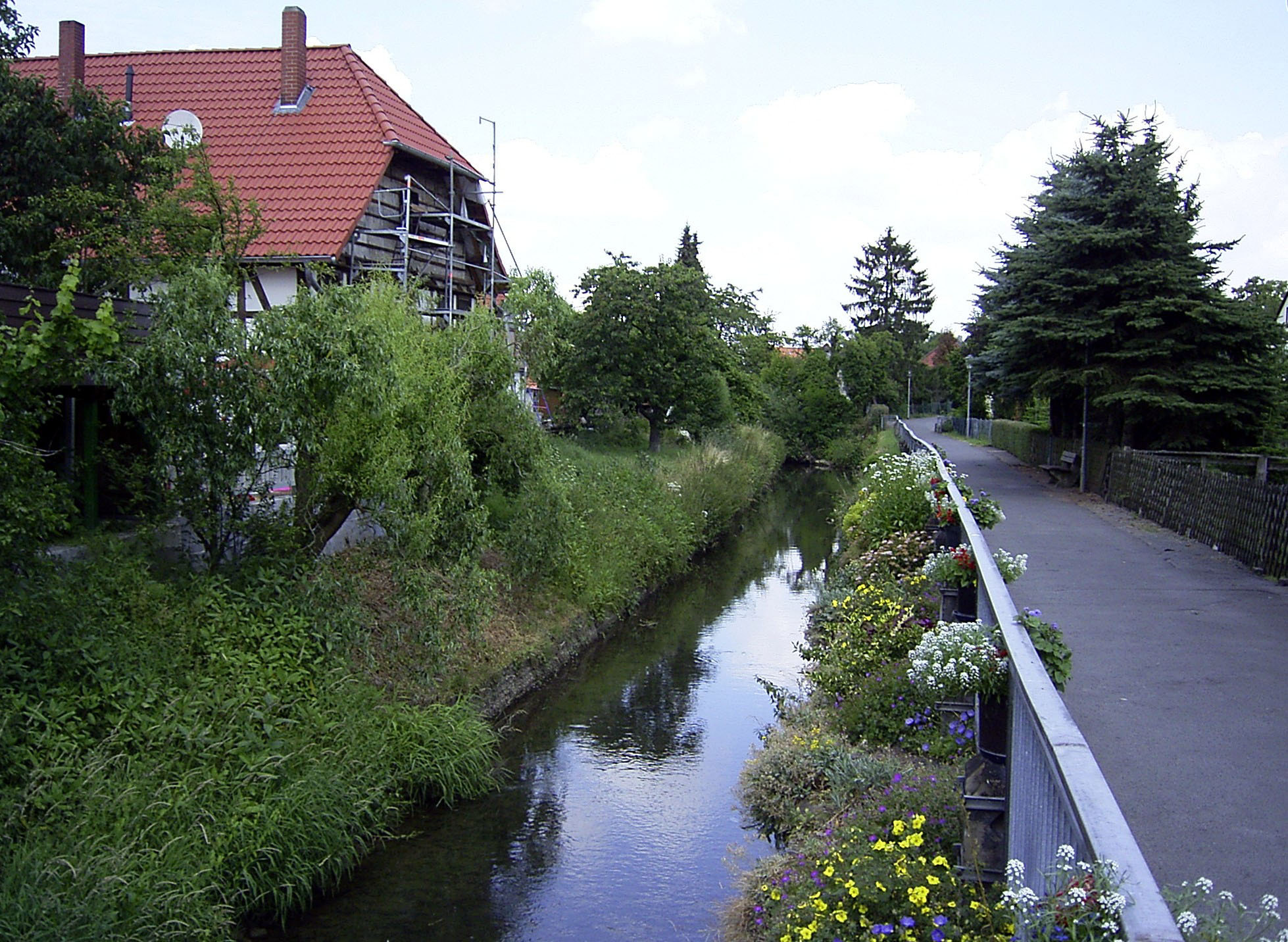

Location
- Country: Germany
- State: Lower Saxony
- Districts: Hamelin-Pyrmont and Schaumburg
- Municipalities: Bad Münder; Messenkamp; Lauenau; Rodenberg; Bad Nenndorf; Auhagen

Physical characteristics
- Source: Bakede
  - location: Süntel
- Mouth: Westaue
  - location: Auhagen
  - coordinates: 52.4060°N 9.3227°E
  - elevation: 49 m (161 ft)
- Length: 28.8 km (17.9 mi)
- Basin size: 174 km^{2} (67 sq mi)
- Width
  - maximum: 2 m (6.6 ft)

Basin features
- Progression: Westaue→ Leine→ Aller→ Weser→ North Sea
- Tributaries
  - left: Pohler Bach, Riesbach, Salzbach
  - right: Flöttenbach

Rodenberger Aue is a river of Lower Saxony, Germany. It flows into the Westaue near Hagenburg.

== Tributaries ==
In brackets: origin Deister, Süntel or Bückeberg

- Flöttenbach (Deister)
- Eimbeckhäuser Dorfbach (Deister)
- Walterbach or Waltershagener Bach (Deister)
- Hülseder Bach (Süntel)
- Meinser Bach (Süntel)
- Riesbach (Bückeberg)
- Pohler Bach (Süntel)
- Altenhäger Bach (Deister)
- Blumenhäger Bach (Deister)
- Schlierbach (Deister)
- Salzbach (Bückeberg)
- Ackersbeeke (Deister)
- Rodebach (Deister)
- Rieper Flahbach (Bückeberg)

== See also ==
- List of rivers of Lower Saxony
