= Rodenberg (Samtgemeinde) =

- Samtgemeinde
- Location of Rodenberg within Schaumburg district
- Interactive map of Rodenberg
- Location within Germany Location within Lower Saxony
- Coordinates: 52°16′N 9°22′E
- Country: Germany
- State: Lower Saxony
- District: Schaumburg

Government
  - Mayor (2021–26): Thomas Wolf

Area
  - Total: 86.21 km^{2} (33.29 sq mi)
- Elevation: 135 m (443 ft)

Population (2025-12-31)
  - Total: 15,445
  - Density: 179.2/km^{2} (464.0/sq mi)
- Time zone: UTC+01:00 (CET)
  - Summer (DST): UTC+02:00 (CEST)
- Postal codes: 31867 resp. 31552
- Dialling codes: 05043 resp. 05723
- Vehicle registration: SHG

The Samtgemeinde Rodenberg is a collective municipality in Lower Saxony, Germany, of about 16,000 inhabitants. It is situated in the east of the district of Schaumburg at the slopes of the hills Deister and Süntel. Its seat is in the town of Rodenberg.

== Subdivisions ==
The collective municipality consists of:

- Apelern (with the quarters Groß Hegesdorf, Kleinhegesdorf, Lyhren, Reinsdorf and Soldorf)
- Hülsede (with the quarters Meinsen and Schmarrie)
- Lauenau (with the quarter Feggendorf)
- Messenkamp (with the quarter Altenhagen II)
- Pohle
- Rodenberg (with the quarter Algesdorf)

== Politics ==
The local elections as of 2014 arose the following result:

=== Council ===
- SPD: 24 seats
- CDU: 17 seats
- FDP: 1 seat
- WGA: 1 seat
- The Left : 1 seat
- Alliance '90/The Greens : 6 seats
- WGS: 4 seats
- WIR: 1 seat

Chairman is Heinrich Oppenhausen (SPD).

=== Mayor ===
Mayor of the collective municipality (German: Samtgemeindebürgermeister) is Thomas Wolf (independent), elected in 2021.
