= Ebersberg (Deister) =

Hill on southern slopes of the Deister in Lower Saxony, Germany

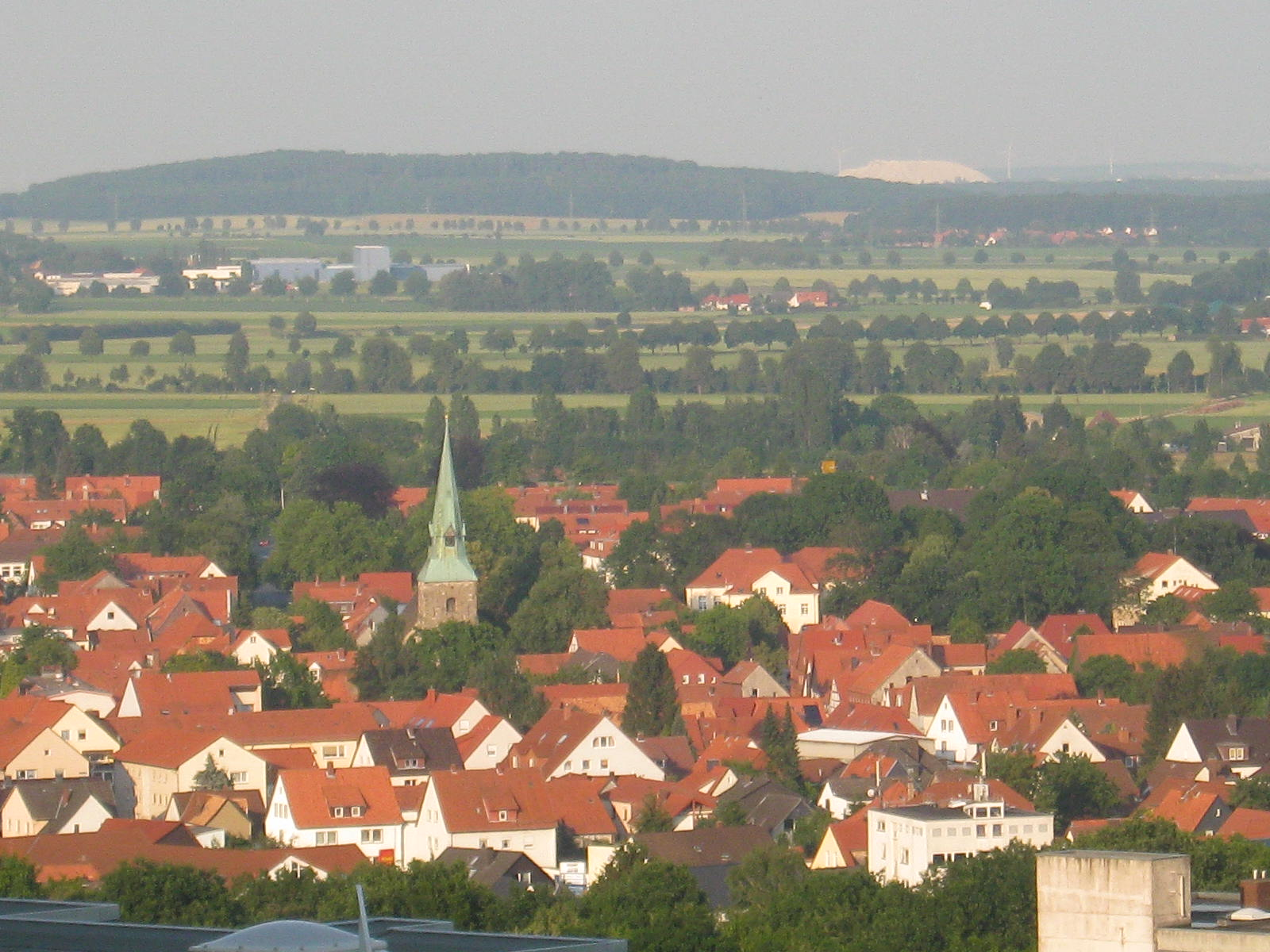
- View from Ebersberg. In the background is the spoil tip of the Siegfried-Giesen potash mine.

Highest point
- Elevation: 355.1 m above sea level (NN) (1,165 ft)
- Prominence: 5 m (16 ft)
- Isolation: 0.8 km (0.50 mi) → Fahrenbrink
- Coordinates: 52°12′45″N 9°31′44″E

Geography
- Location within Lower Saxony
- Location: Lower Saxony (Germany)
- Parent range: Deister

The Ebersberg lies on the southern slopes of the Deister ridge in Lower Saxony, Germany. It is located southwest of the city of Hanover. On its slopes is the town of Springe.

== Ascent ==
There are numerous footpaths in the Deister which offer several options for climbing the Ebersberg. The ascent from Springe itself is steep.

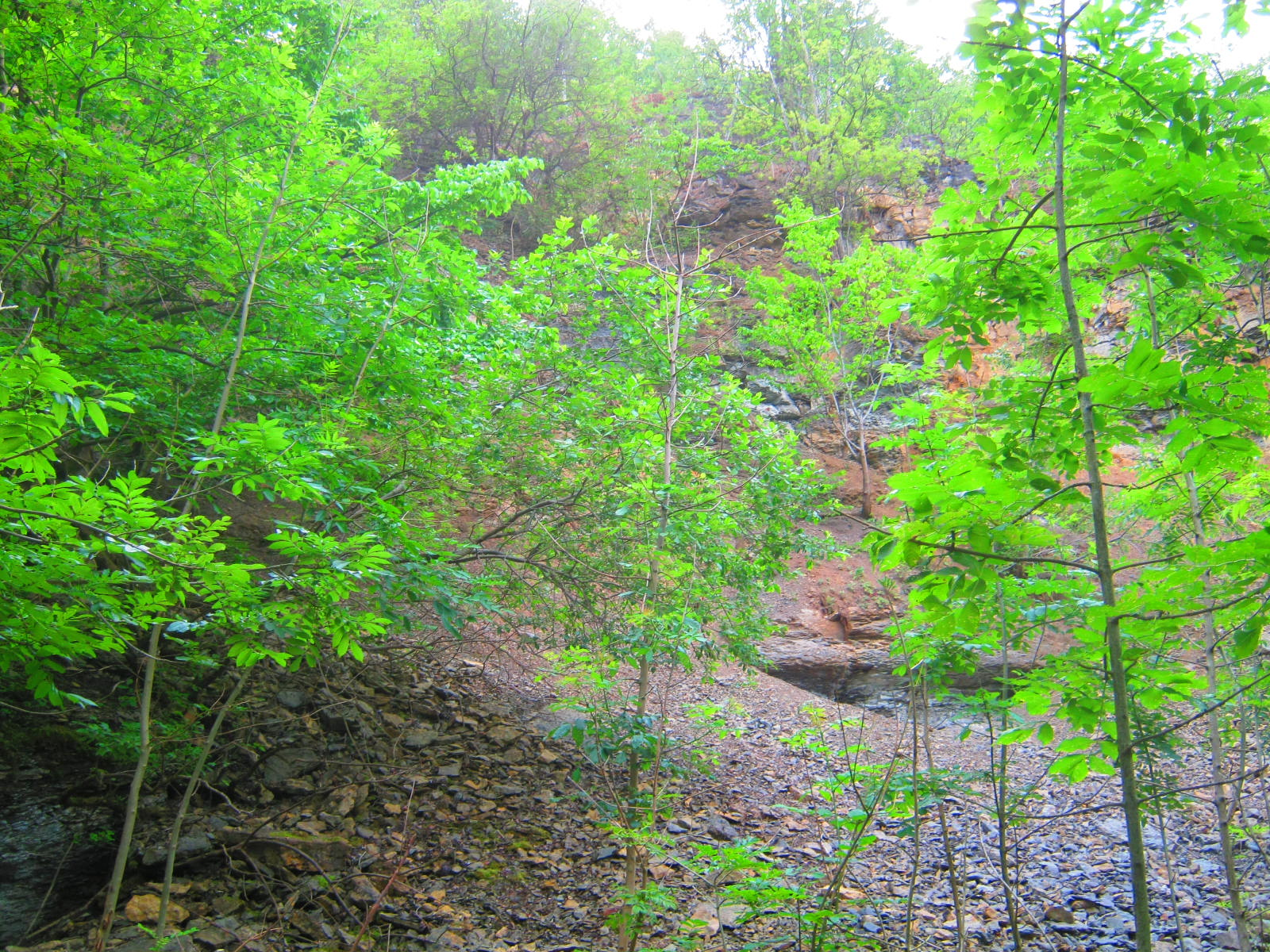
Hillside on the Ebersberg

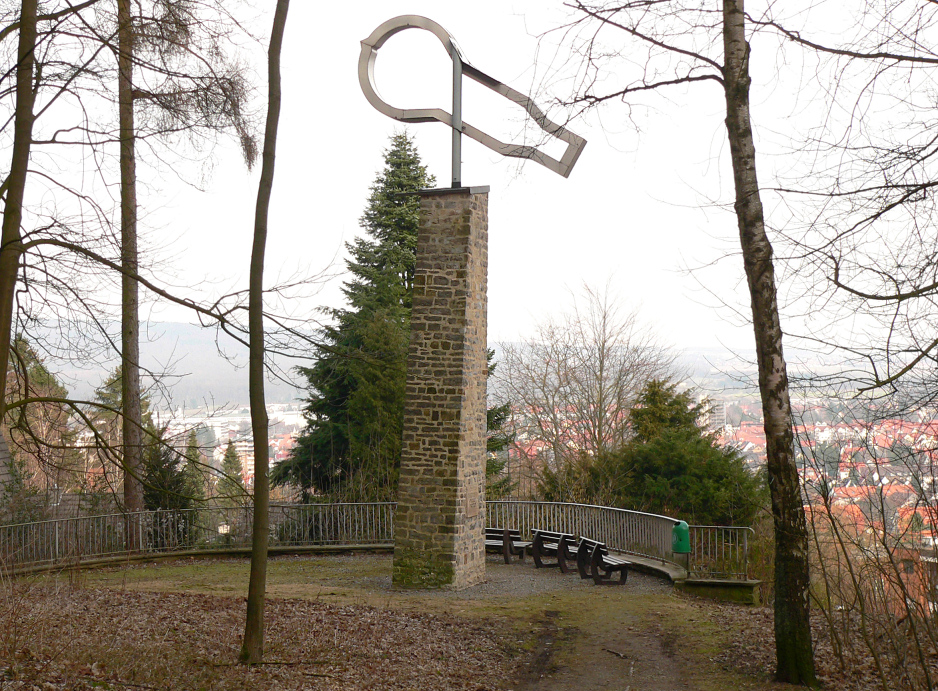
Memorial on the Göbelbastei above Springe to Heinrich Göbel, featuring a symbol of an incandescent light bulb that he claimed to have invented in the 1850s, predating Thomas Edison's 1880 patent but after Warren De la Rue's 1840 coiled platinum filament.

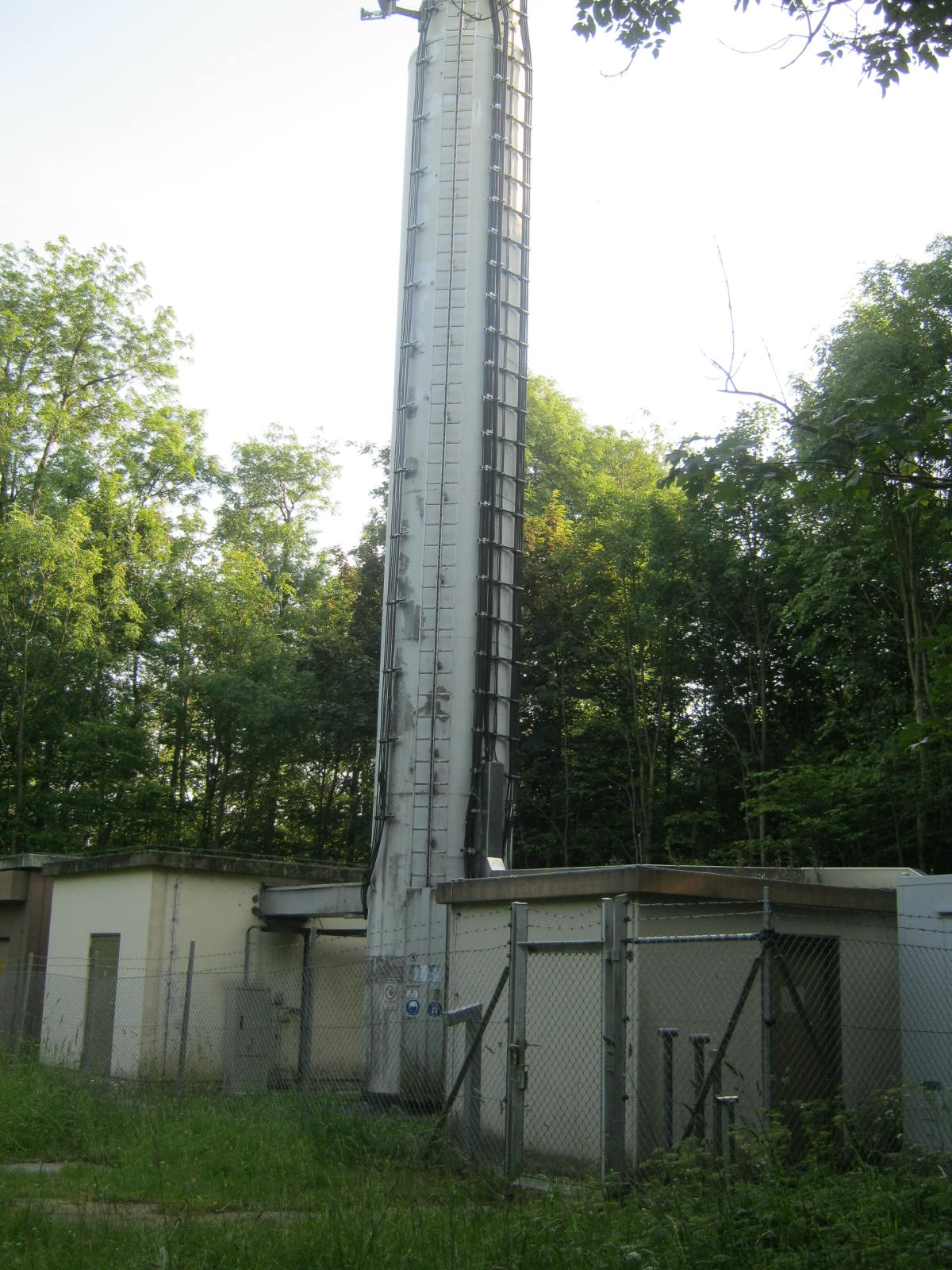
Antenna site on the domed summit of the Ebersberg

== Sights ==
On the hillside above Springe, the Göbelbastei with its permanently lit light commemorates Heinrich Göbel who was born in Springe. From here there is a good view of the town. In good weather, visitors can see as far as the Brocken in the Harz mountains.

At the foot of the hill is the Ebersberg glacial erratic (Findling am Ebersberg), a recognised natural monument.
