= Rodenberger =

Rodenberger is a German surname. Notable people with the surname include:

- Jeff Rodenberger (born 1959), American football player
- Lou Halsell Rodenberger (1926–2009), American author, educator and journalist

== See also ==
- Rodenberger Aue, river in Germany
