= Apelern =

- Municipality
- Coat of arms

- Location of Apelern within Schaumburg district
- Interactive map of Apelern
- Location within Germany Location within Lower Saxony
- Coordinates: 52°17′25″N 09°20′14″E
- Country: Germany
- State: Lower Saxony
- District: Schaumburg
- Municipal assoc.: Rodenberg
- Subdivisions: 6

Government
  - Mayor: A. Kölle (SPD)

Area
  - Total: 24.6 km^{2} (9.5 sq mi)
- Elevation: 81 m (266 ft)

Population (2025-12-31)
  - Total: 2,403
  - Density: 97.7/km^{2} (253/sq mi)
- Time zone: UTC+01:00 (CET)
  - Summer (DST): UTC+02:00 (CEST)
- Postal codes: 31552
- Dialling codes: 05043
- Vehicle registration: SHG

Apelern is a municipality in the Samtgemeinde of Rodenberg in the district of Schaumburg, in Lower Saxony, Germany. It lies in the Deister-Süntel valley and is situated close to the A2 Autobahn at Lauenau and south of Rodenberg, between the Deister, Süntel and Bückeberg ridges. The Riesbach stream flows through the village and into the Rodenberger Aue (stream).

As well as the village of Apelern itself, the community of Apelern includes the villages of Gross Hegesdorf, Kleinhegesdorf, Lyhren, Reinsdorf and Soldorf.

The existence of Apelern is documented as far back as 1162 when the church was built. The name means roughly "at the apple trees", and there are apple trees in the park of the Münchhausen estate to this day. In Saxon times (c. 8th and 9th centuries) Apelern had a place of worship (the seat of an archdeaconry) and a court of justice. At the end of the 12th century, the church was the main church of the Buckigau.

In common with many villages in Germany and elsewhere, its history is closely connected with that of the local nobility. For the last 300 to 400 years the noble families of Münchhausen and Hammerstein have stamped their mark on the village.

Buildings worth visiting in the village are

- The double-aisle church, which was built in around 1162
- Schloss Münchhausen (1561), the writer and poet Börries von Münchhausen lived here.
- Schloss Hammerstein (1590)
