= Sachsenhäger Aue =

River in Germany

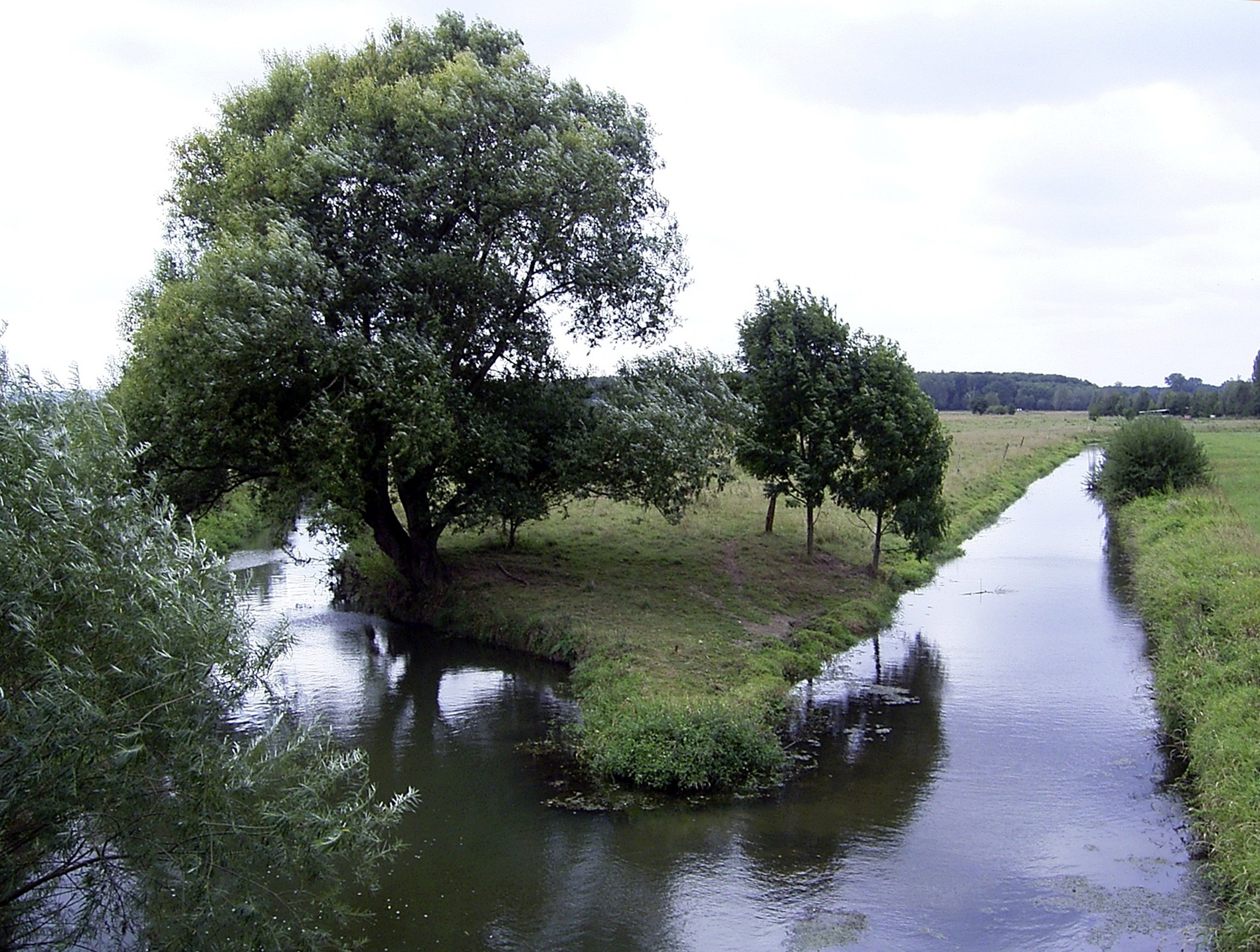
- Confluence of the Rodenberger Aue (left) and the Sachsenhäger Aue (right), into the Westaue

Location
- Country: Germany
- State: Lower Saxony

Physical characteristics
- Mouth
  - location: 52.4062°N 9.3229°E

Basin features
- Progression: Westaue→ Leine→ Aller→ Weser→ North Sea

Sachsenhäger Aue is a river of Lower Saxony, Germany. Its mouth is the confluence of the Rodenberger Aue and the Sachsenhäger Aue, forming the Westaue.

== See also ==
- List of rivers of Lower Saxony
