= Westaue =

River in Germany

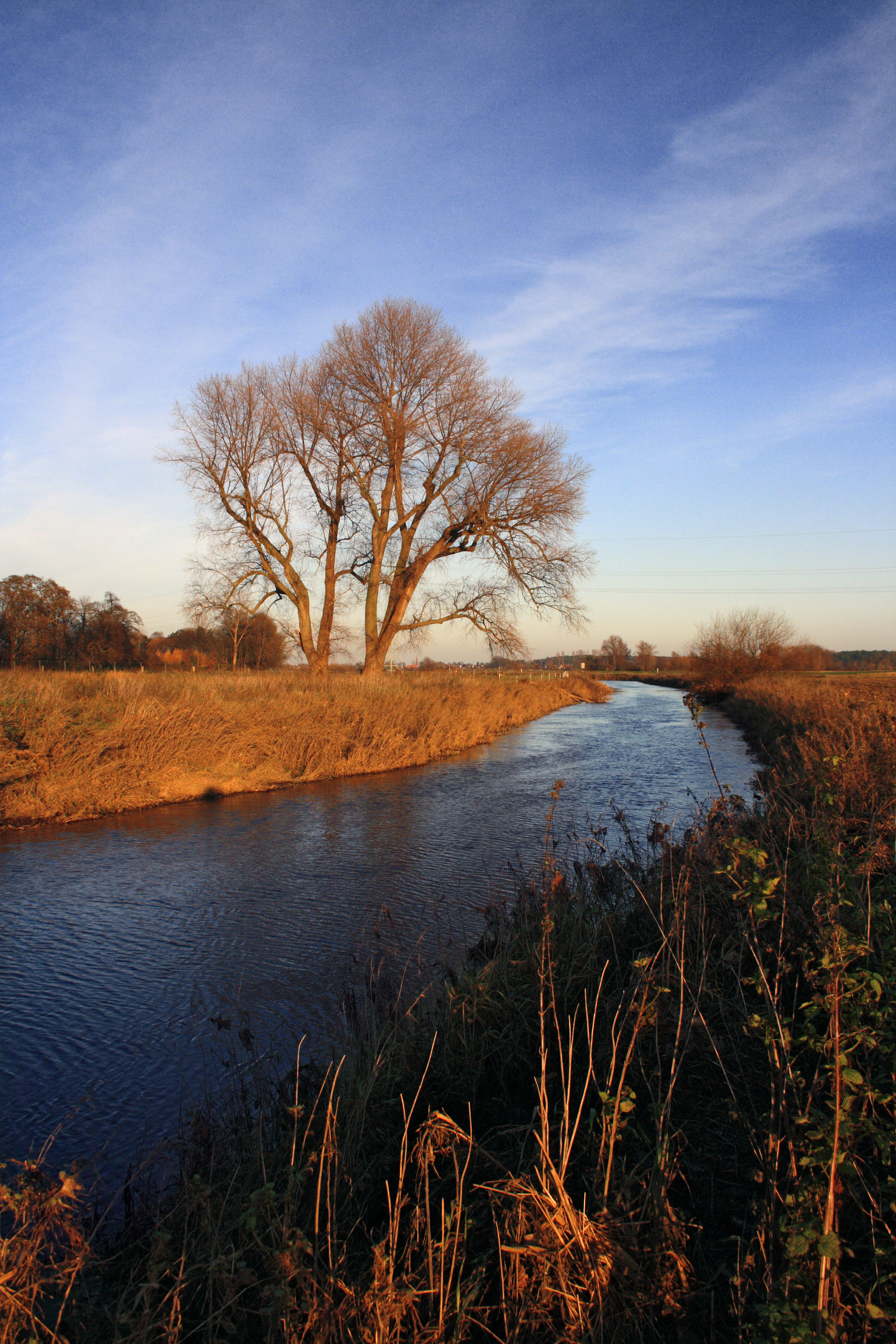

Location
- Country: Germany
- State: Lower Saxony

Physical characteristics
- Source
  - location: Confluence of the Rodenberger Aue and the Sachsenhäger Aue
  - coordinates: 52.4062°N 9.3229°E
- Mouth
  - location: Leine
  - coordinates: 52°27′16″N 9°28′06″E
- Length: 30.2 km (18.8 mi)
- Basin size: 595 km^{2} (230 sq mi)

Basin features
- Progression: Leine→ Aller→ Weser→ North Sea

Westaue is a river of Lower Saxony, Germany. It springs from the confluence of the Rodenberger Aue and the Sachsenhäger Aue. It flows into the Leine north of Wunstorf.

== See also ==
- List of rivers of Lower Saxony
