= Hamel (river) =

River in Germany

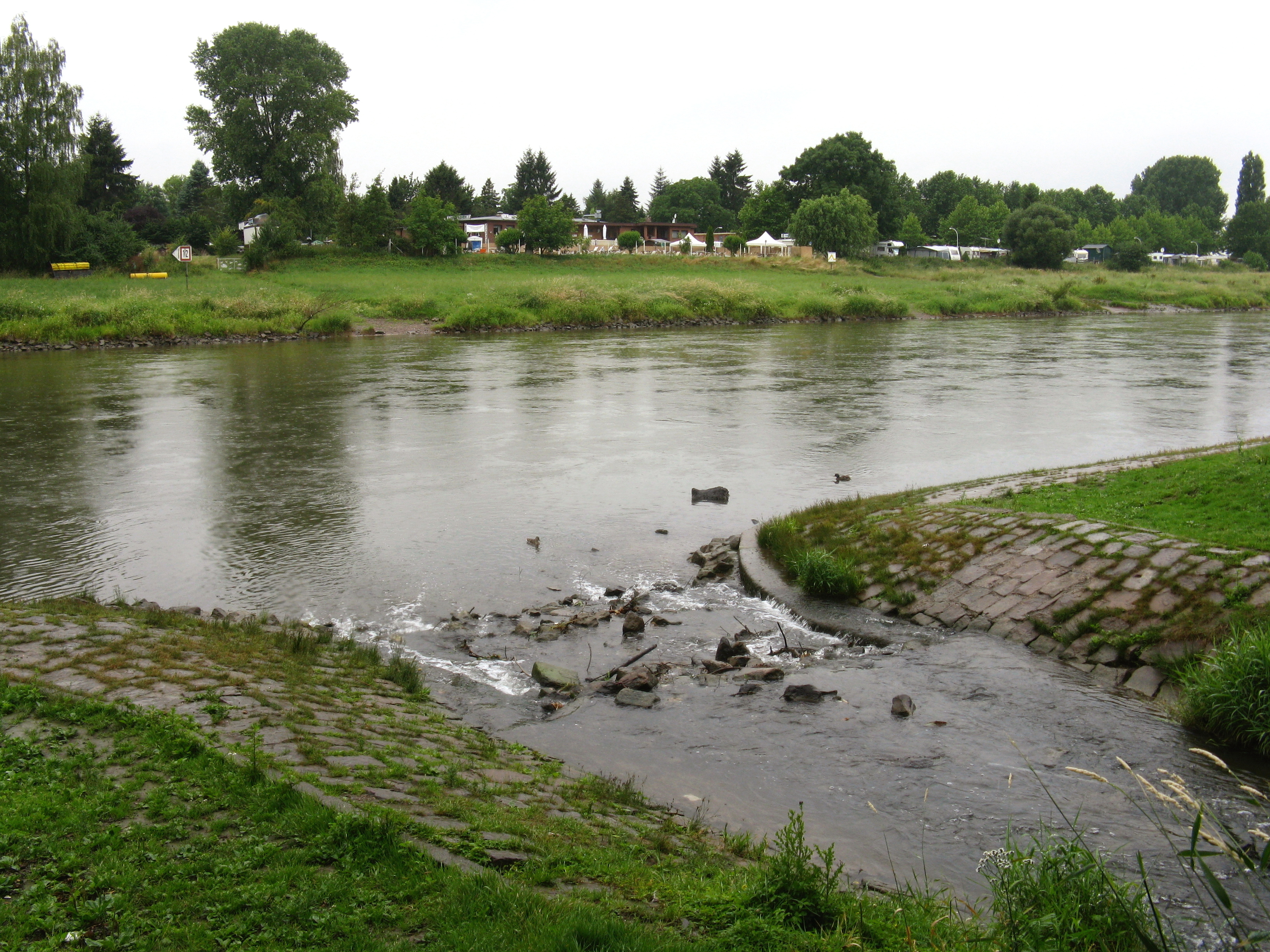
- Hamel river, where it merges with the Weser river

Location
- Country: Germany
- State: Lower Saxony

Physical characteristics
- Mouth
  - location: Weser
  - coordinates: 52.1092°N 9.3498°E
- Length: 26.9 km (16.7 mi)

Basin features
- Progression: Weser→ North Sea

Hamel (in its lower course: Fluthamel) is a river of Lower Saxony, Germany. It flows into the Weser in Hameln.

== See also ==
- List of rivers of Lower Saxony
