= Lauenau =

- Municipality
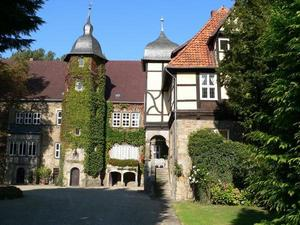
- Castle Schwedesdorf in Lauenau

- Coat of arms

- Location of Lauenau within Schaumburg district
- Interactive map of Lauenau
- Location within Germany Location within Lower Saxony
- Coordinates: 52°16′N 9°22′E
- Country: Germany
- State: Lower Saxony
- District: Schaumburg
- Municipal assoc.: Rodenberg
- Subdivisions: 4 Ortsteile

Government
  - Mayor: Wilfried Mundt (SPD)

Area
  - Total: 16.23 km^{2} (6.27 sq mi)
- Elevation: 135 m (443 ft)

Population (2025-12-31)
  - Total: 4,198
  - Density: 258.7/km^{2} (669.9/sq mi)
- Time zone: UTC+01:00 (CET)
  - Summer (DST): UTC+02:00 (CEST)
- Postal codes: 31867
- Dialling codes: 05043
- Vehicle registration: SHG

Lauenau is a small town in Lower Saxony, Germany, with about 4,400 residents. It is situated in the east of the district of Schaumburg just off the A2 Autobahn at the foot of the Deister ridge in the Deister-Süntel valley. As well as Lauenau itself, the parish includes the village of Feggendorf, a former coal mining community on the slopes of the Deister which now has a mining museum.

== History ==
- Lauenau is documented in 1059 for the first time.
- In about 1200 Lauenau Castle was built by Duke Henry the Lion, of the Guelphs as a stronghold against the counts of Schaumburg.
- In 1536 Lauenau was granted three annual markets by the Count of Schaumburg, to whom the area belonged, as well as the right to brew beer and to hold a court with jurisdiction over minor cases. After the extinction of the line of the counts of Schaumburg in 1640 in the course of the Thirty Years' War, the County of Schaumburg was split up and Lauenau became part of the Duchy of Brunswick-Lüneburg, which later became part of the kingdom of Hanover and then the Prussian province of Hanover.
- In 1682 the town was almost totally destroyed by fire.
- During the Seven Years' War, the town was occupied by the French.
- In recent times the town was a centre of the furniture industry of Lower Saxony. Today Lauenau is an expanding community due to its proximity to the Autobahn and to Hanover with fast growing population and industries generating jobs .

== Facilities ==
In town there are 3 Kindergartens and two Forest kindergartens; a basic school system (1st - 4th grade); doctors, pharmacies and several supermarkets (Edeka, Netto, Penny and ALDI).

== Castles ==
Lauenau has three castles:

- The 12th-century castle of Henry the Lion was destroyed in 1519, during a feud over the monasteries, by the Schaumburg commander Ludolf von Münchhausen. The castle was rebuilt between 1565 and 1572, with a moat, in the style of the Weser Renaissance. Today it is privately occupied.
- Meysenbug Castle was built in 1499 as a military fort. Count Anthonius von Holstein-Schaumburg granted the castle to Wulfferd von Zerssen as a fiefdom. In 1828 the estate was granted by William II, Elector of Hesse, to Carl Georg Philipp Rivalier von Meysenbug, who had been granted the Barony of Meysenbug which had become extinct. Subsequently von Meysenbug held various ministerial positions in Hesse, and he was the father of the well-known writer Malwida von Meysenbug.
- Schwedesdorf Castle, built by the von Münchhausens between 1596 and 1600.

== Other institutions ==
In addition there is the late 19th century St Luke's Church, which is regarded as the masterpiece of ecclesiastical architect Conrad Wilhelm Hase, a mineral-rich spa and a privately owned micro-brewery, which was founded in 1861 by Sebastian Rupp.

== Politics ==
The local elections on 11 September 2011 had the following result:

=== Council ===
- SPD 8 seats
- CDU 4 seats
- Grüne 3 seats

=== Mayor ===
Wilfried Mundt (SPD) .

Former mayors of Lauenau:

Ernst Möbius	(SPD)	(1946–1948)
Karl Reinecke	(DP)	(1949)
Friedrich Garbe	(SPD)	(1950)
Karl Reinecke	(DP)	(1951)
Friedrich Garbe	(SPD)	(1952)
Karl Reinecke	(DP)	(1953)
Friedrich Garbe	(SPD)	(1954–1966)
Helmut Garbe	(SPD)	(1966–1974)
Friedrich Dierßen	(SPD)	(1974–1976)
Gerhard Richter	(SPD)	(1976–1996)
Uwe Heilmann	(SPD)	(1996–2001)
Heinz Laufmöller	(SPD	(2001-2015)
