= Bad Münder =

- Town
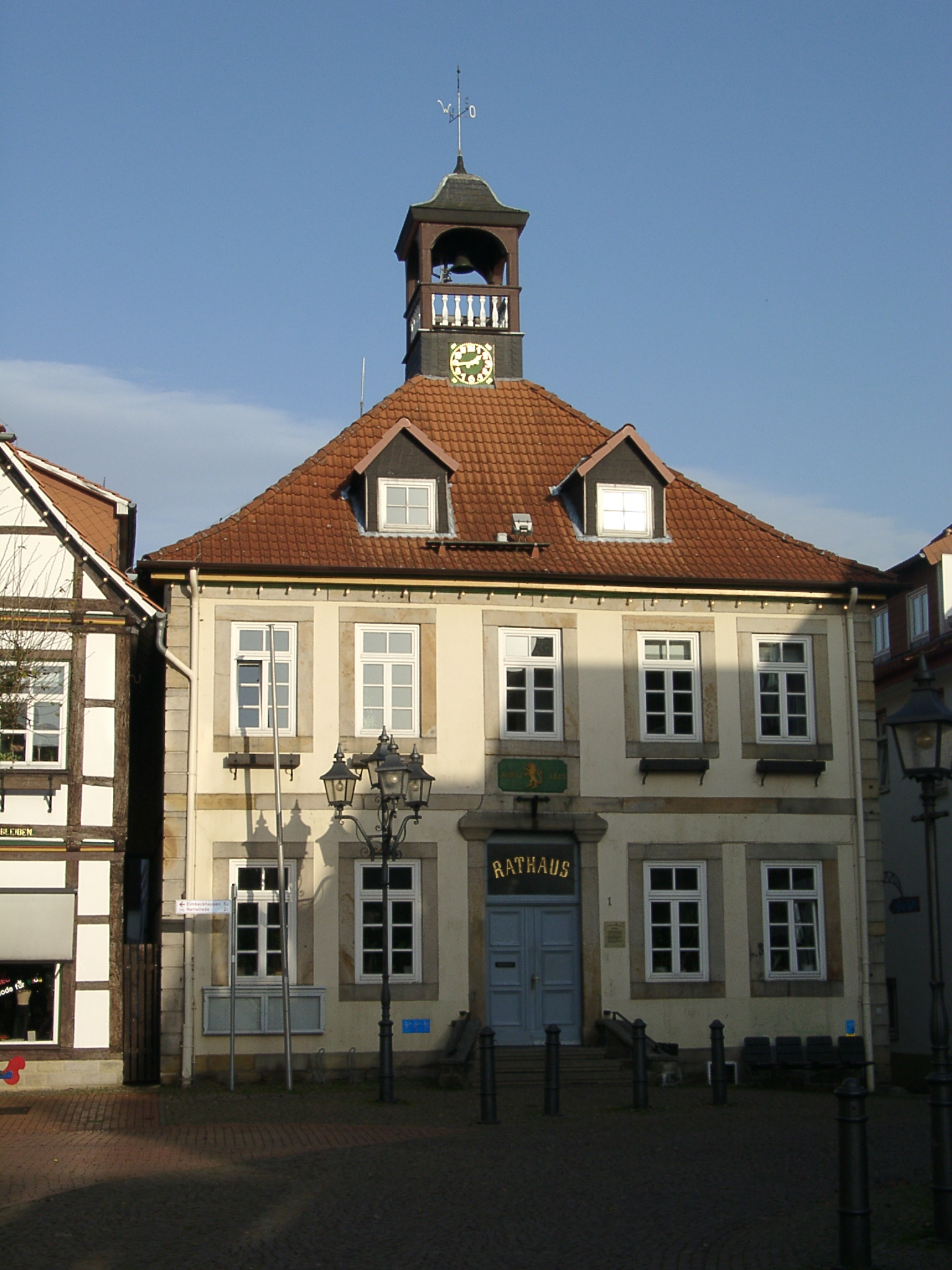

- Flag Coat of arms

- Location of Bad Münder within Hameln-Pyrmont district
- Interactive map of Bad Münder
- Location within Germany Location within Lower Saxony
- Coordinates: 52°11′57″N 09°27′55″E
- Country: Germany
- State: Lower Saxony
- District: Hameln-Pyrmont

Government
  - Mayor (2021–26): Dirk Barkowski (Ind.)

Area
  - Total: 107.97 km^{2} (41.69 sq mi)
- Elevation: 119 m (390 ft)

Population (2025-12-31)
  - Total: 17,417
  - Density: 161.31/km^{2} (417.80/sq mi)
- Time zone: UTC+01:00 (CET)
  - Summer (DST): UTC+02:00 (CEST)
- Postal codes: 31848
- Dialling codes: 05042
- Vehicle registration: HM
- Website: www.bad-muender.de

Bad Münder am Deister (German pronunciation: [baːt ˈmʏndɐ ʔam ˈdaɪstɐ], lit. 'Bad Münder on the Deister'), commonly known as Bad Münder (West Low German: Bad Münner), is a town in the Hamelin-Pyrmont district, Lower Saxony, Germany. It is on the south side of the Deister hills in the Deister-Süntel valley, about 15 kilometres (9.3 mi) northeast of Hamelin. The city with 16 districts has about 17,400 inhabitants (2020). The district Bad Münder is the administrative centre with about 8,000 inhabitants.

== Sons and daughters of the town ==
- Georg Philipp Holscher (1792–1852), ophthalmologist
- Christian Ludwig Fröhlich (14 June 1799 – 11 March 1870), executioner in Hoya
- August Pott (born 1802 in Nettelrede; died 1887), linguist
- Friedrich Wilhelm Nolte (1880–1952), politician (German-Hanoverian Party)
- Leo Wispler (1890–1958), writer
- Hans Piepho (born 1909 in Eimbeckhausen; died 1996), zoologist, entomologist and university teacher
- Hildegard Falck (born 1949 in Nettelrede), Olympic champion runner
- Karl-Martin Hentschel (born 1950), politician, Alliance 90/The Greens
- Frank Jelinski (born 1953), racing driver
