= Pohle =

- Municipality
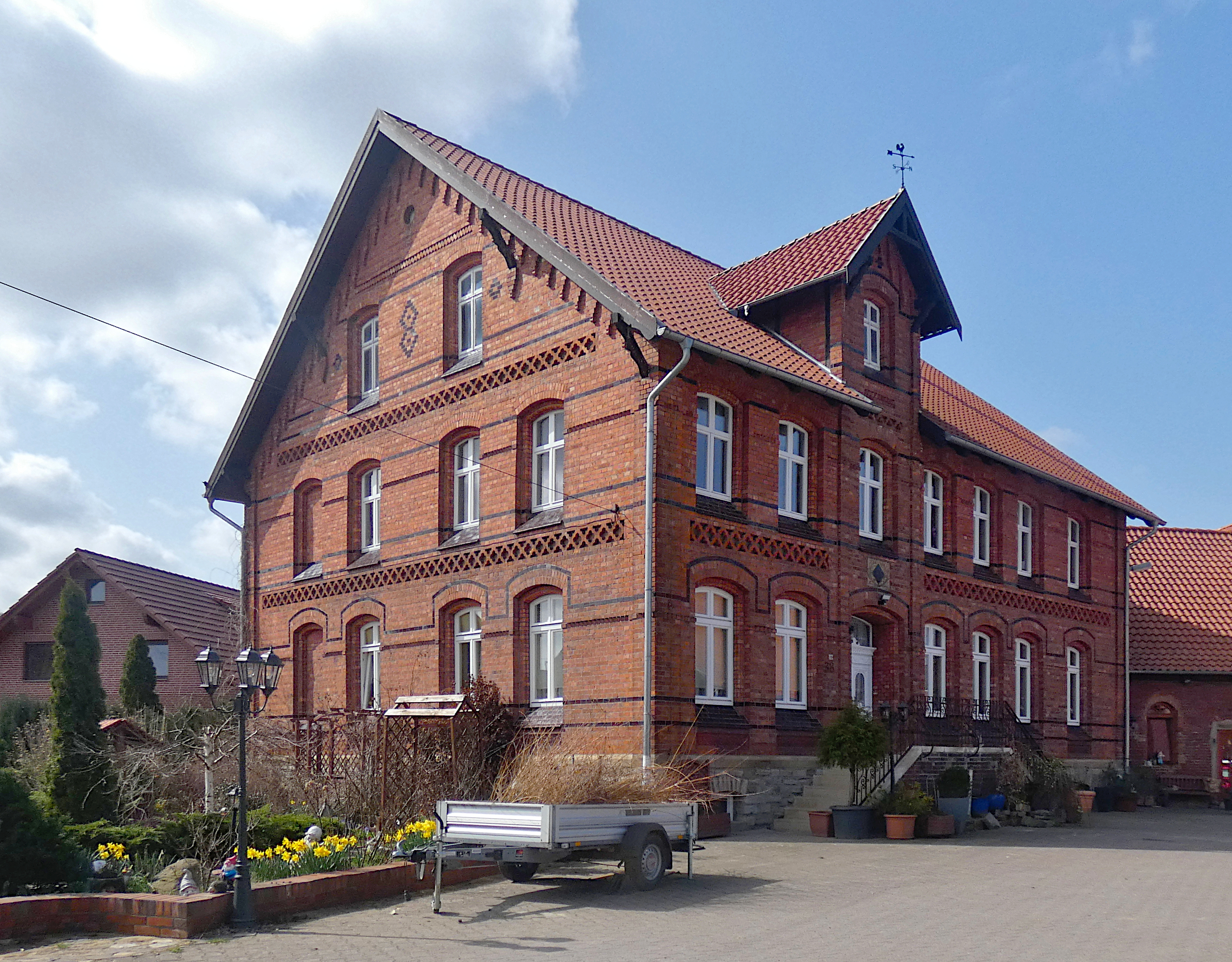

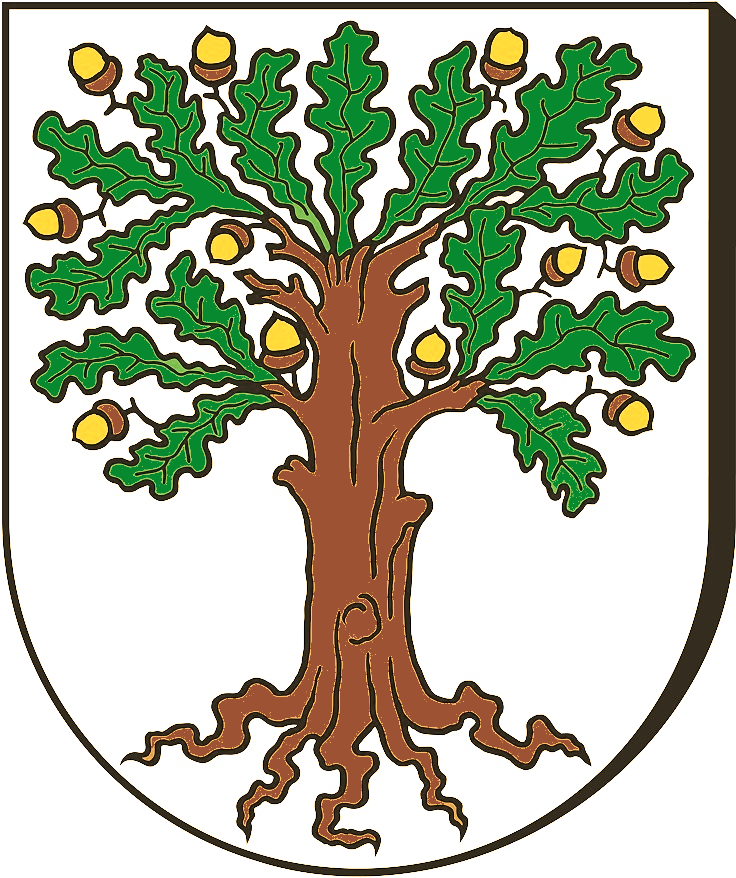
- Coat of arms

- Location of Pohle within Schaumburg district
- Interactive map of Pohle
- Location within Germany Location within Lower Saxony
- Coordinates: 52°15′50″N 9°20′24″E
- Country: Germany
- State: Lower Saxony
- District: Schaumburg
- Municipal assoc.: Rodenberg

Government
  - Mayor: Jörg-Wilhelm Hupe (CDU)

Area
  - Total: 7.21 km^{2} (2.78 sq mi)
- Elevation: 99 m (325 ft)

Population (2025-12-31)
  - Total: 831
  - Density: 115/km^{2} (299/sq mi)
- Time zone: UTC+01:00 (CET)
  - Summer (DST): UTC+02:00 (CEST)
- Postal codes: 31867
- Dialling codes: 05043
- Vehicle registration: SHG

Pohle (German pronunciation: [ˈpoːlə]) is a municipality in the district of Schaumburg, in Lower Saxony, Germany.
