= Heinrich Göbel =

German-born American inventor

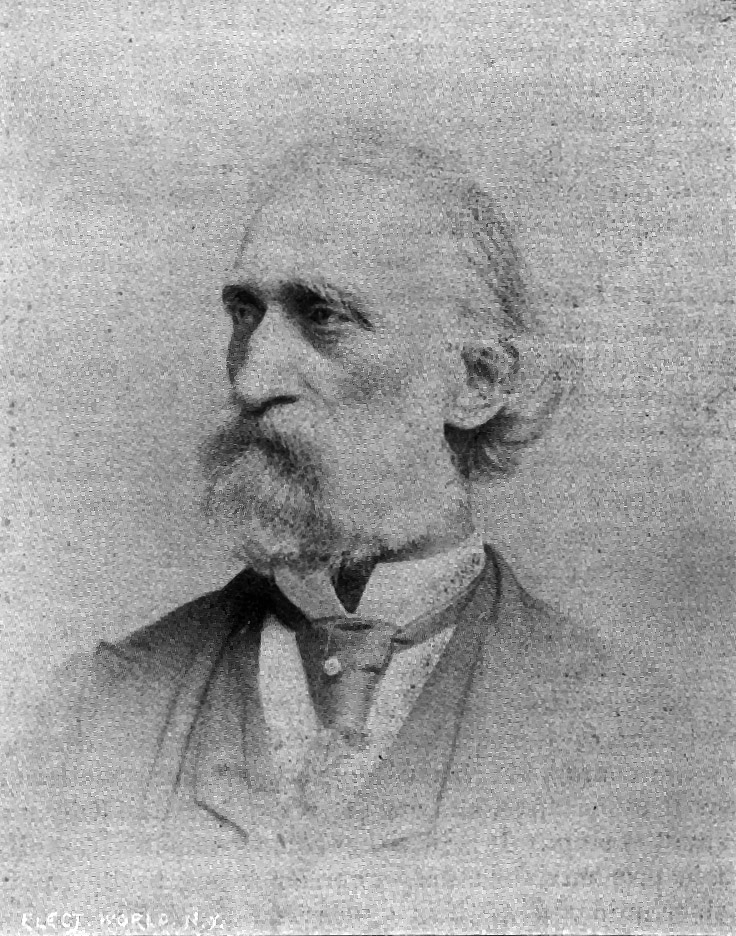
- First published photo of Heinrich Göbel, in January 1893
- Born: April 20, 1818; Springe, Germany
- Died: December 4, 1893 (aged 75); New York City, United States
- Burial place: Green-Wood Cemetery
- Other name: Henry Goebel
- Citizenship: United States (1865 – 1893)
- Occupations: Mechanic, inventor
- Spouses: Sophie Lübke née Rodewig (m. 1844; died 1887)

Heinrich Göbel (April 20, 1818 – December 4, 1893) was a German-born American precision mechanic and inventor also known by his anglicized name Henry Goebel. In 1848 he immigrated to New York City, where he resided until his death. He received American citizenship in 1865.

In 1893, magazines and newspapers reported that 25 years earlier Göbel had developed incandescent light bulbs comparable to those invented in 1879 by Thomas Alva Edison. Göbel did not apply for a patent for this invention.

In 1893, the Edison Electric Light Company sued three manufacturers of incandescent lamps for infringing Edison's patent. The defense of these companies claimed the Edison patent was void because of the same invention by Göbel 25 years earlier, which came to be known as the Goebel defense.

Judges of four courts (Note: Details are given in this article in section Litigation using the "Göbel defense" in 1893 and 1894. Judges of courts in Boston, St. Louis, Milwaukee and Chicago raised doubts. Judges in Philadelphia ruled based on these decisions.) raised doubts; there was no clear and convincing proof for the claimed invention. Research work published in 2007 concluded that the Goebel defense was fraudulent. After Göbel's death the legend arose in some countries that he was the true inventor of the practical incandescent light bulb.

Göbel acquired patents for an improvement of sewing machines in 1865, for an improvement of the Geissler pump in 1882, and for a technique to connect carbon threads to metal wires in incandescent lamps in 1882. These three patents have had no influence on further technical developments to date.

== Biography ==
=== Springe, Germany 1818–1848 ===
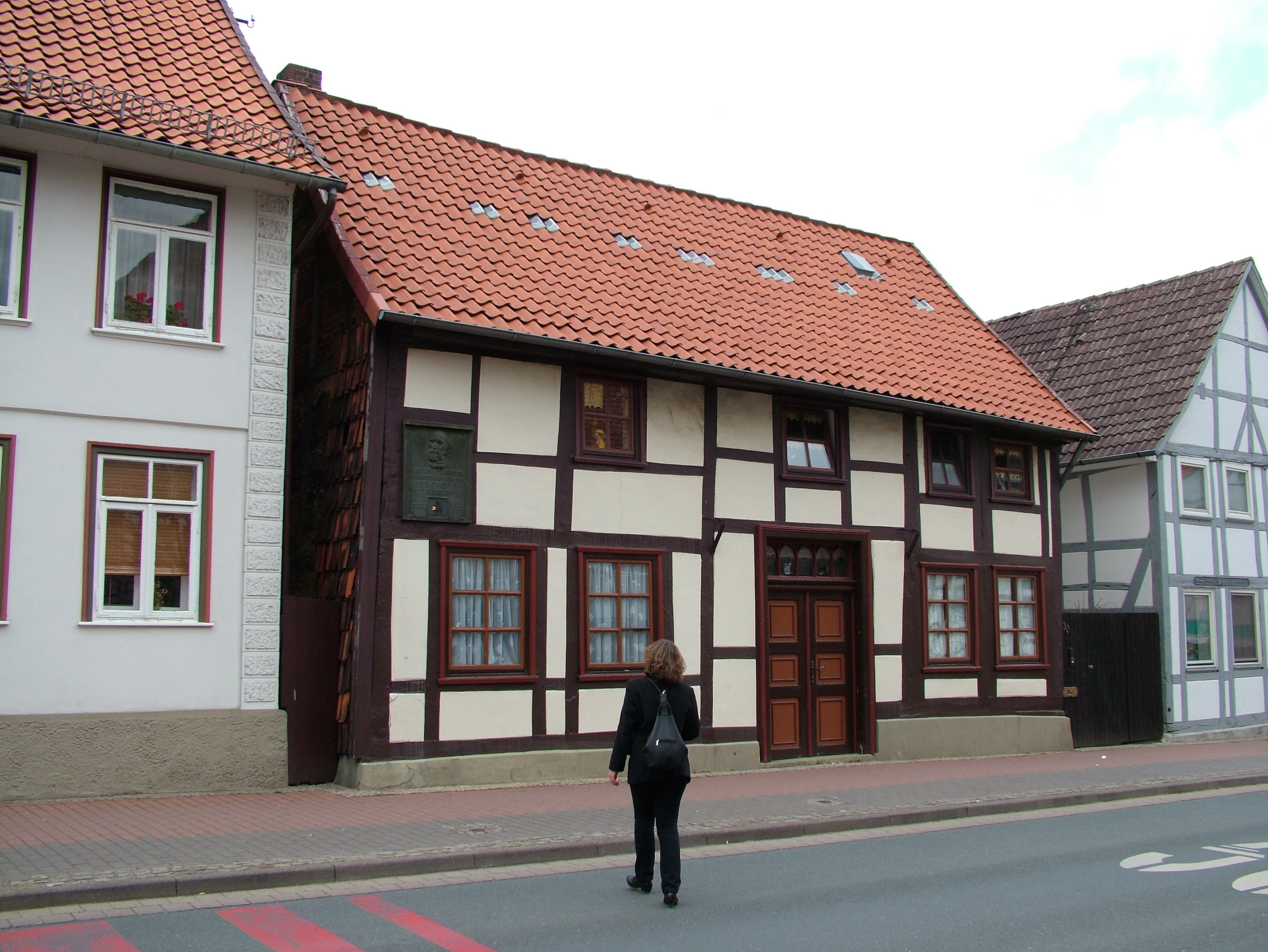
House that was believed to be Göbel's birthplace. However, while he lived in this house in the 1840s, it is not his birthplace. At the front side of this house an incandescent light bulb is lit day and night.

On April 20, 1818, Heinrich Göbel was born in Springe near Hanover in Germany. His father, Heinrich Christian Göbel, was a gardener and later a door-to-door salesman for chocolate. The name of his mother was Marie Eleonore née Hüper. At that time Springe was a small village in the Kingdom of Hanover with less than 2000 inhabitants that mostly worked in agriculture.

Heinrich Göbel finished school in 1832 with poor marks. One teacher commented, "He seems to have an inventive mind. The reasons of the poor marks appear to be in his lengthy illness."

In 1834, master locksmith Gerhard Linde of Springe took on Göbel as an apprentice for three years. It is not known whether Göbel finished this apprenticeship. Göbel started to work as a repair mechanic in 1837. Later in the 1850s in New York, he gave 1837 as the foundation date of his business on a business card of his shop.

In 1844, Göbel married Sophie Lübke née Rodewig, stating watchmaker as his profession at that time. There are no sources to confirm training as watchmaker, but Göbel likely learned by doing work comparable to a precision mechanic before he began operating his one-person business repairing and selling clocks. His son Johann Carl was born 1846, and his daughter Marie Sophie in 1848.

At the age of 30, Göbel migrated to New York City with his family, leaving Germany through Bremen in November 1848 on the sailing ship J.W. Andrews, arriving in New York on 31 January 1849. According to the list of passengers of the ship, he gave mechanic as his profession. The reasons for migration are not known.

=== New York 1849–1893 ===
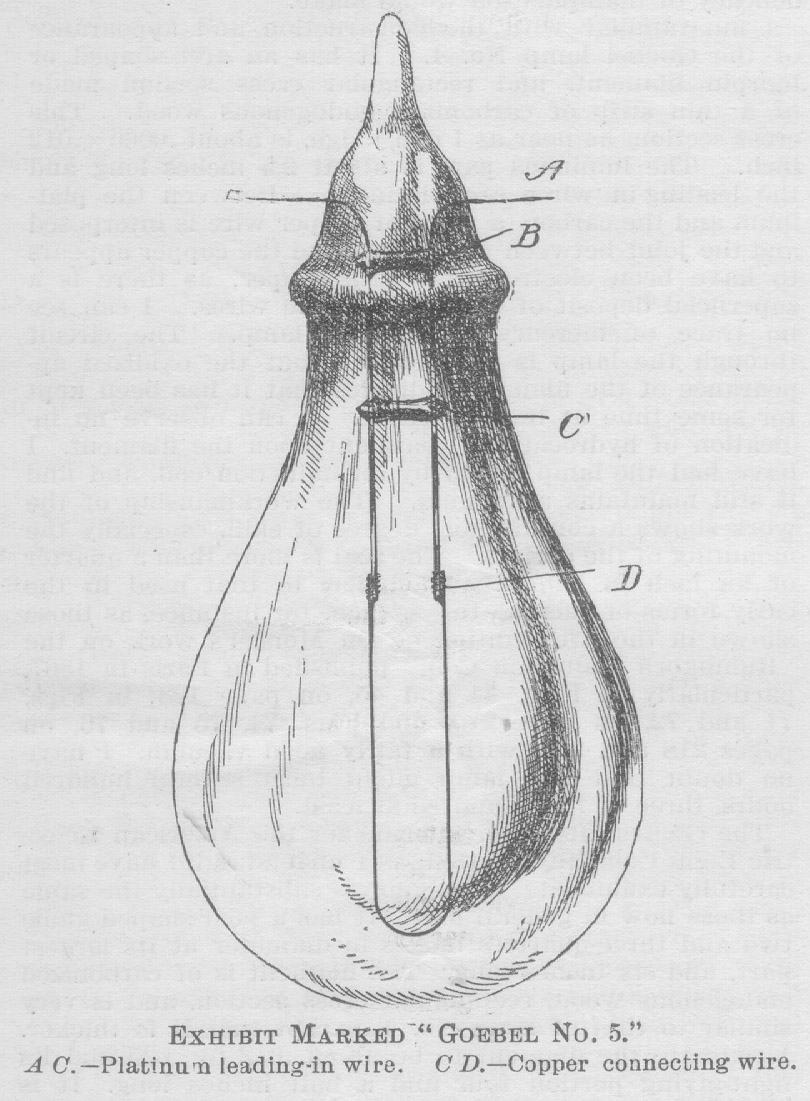
Goebel No. 5. This lamp was exhibited in Göbel's shop on April 29, 1882

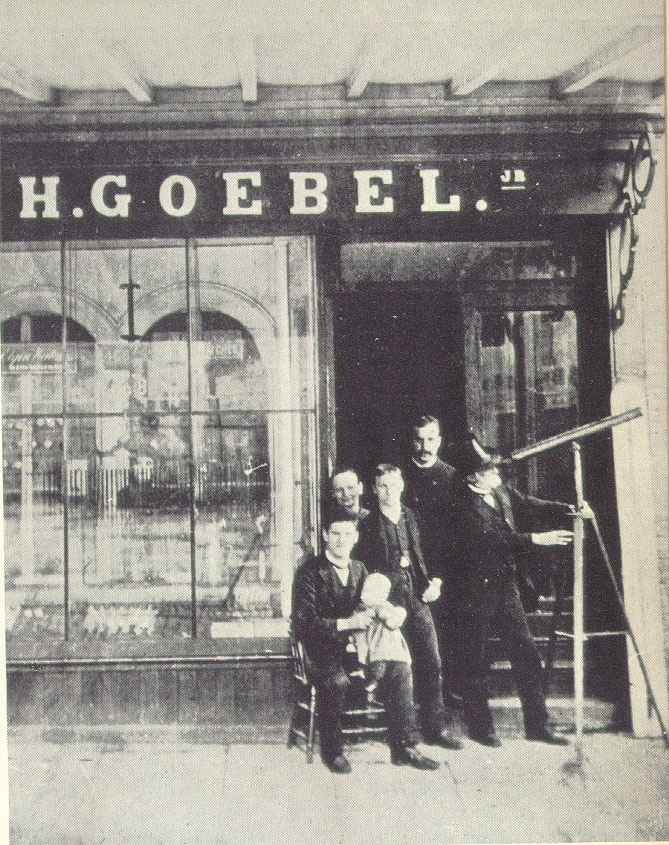
Goebel-Shop in New York, Grand Street 468. This photo was probably taken in the year 1893 to support the Göbel story. The telescope that Göbel used in the 1850s on a horse wagon was much larger.

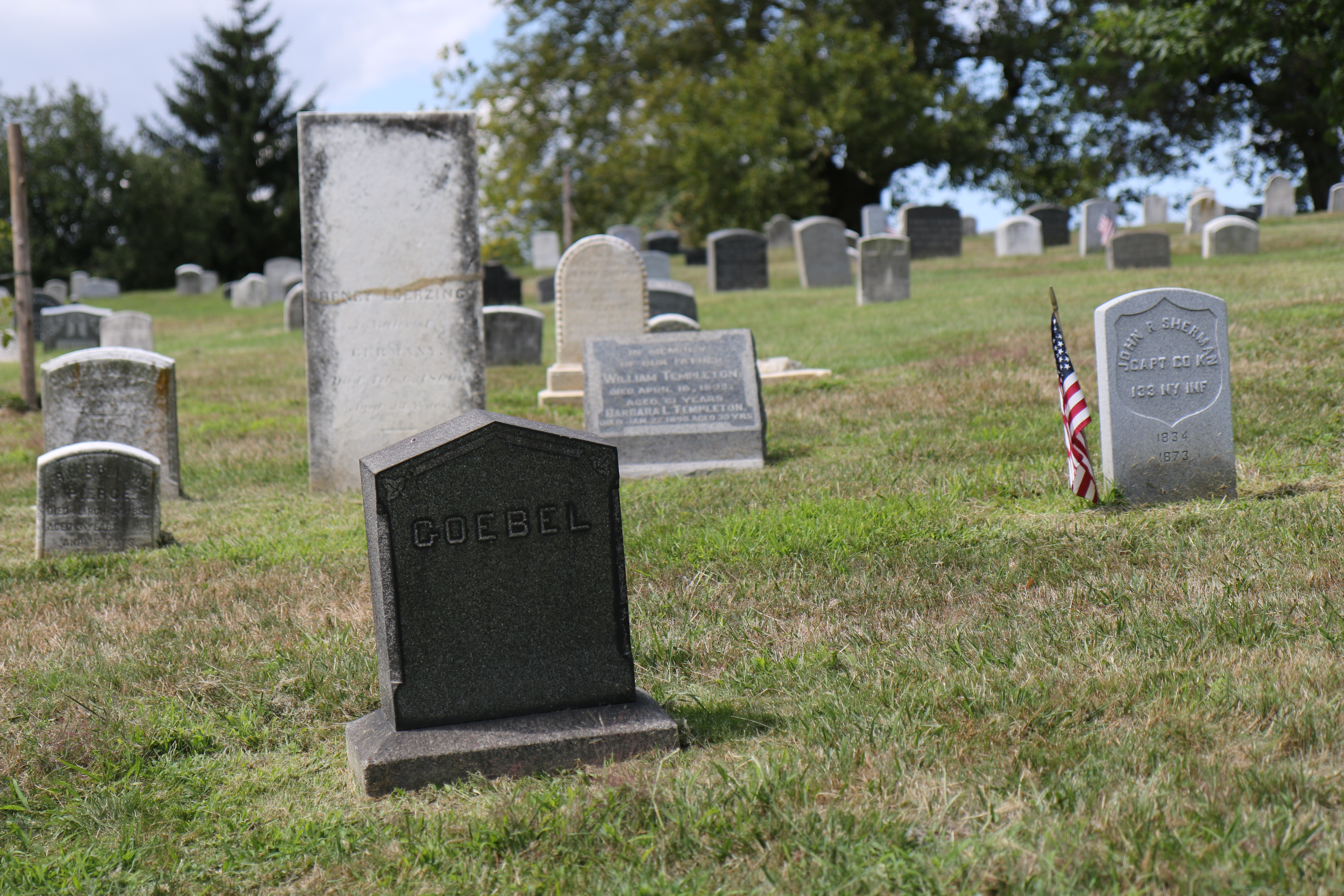
Grave of Göbel and his wife at Green-Wood cemetery in Brooklyn, New York

In New York City, Göbel opened a shop in Monroe Street called Jewelry, Horology and Optician's Store. To supplement his income, Göbel constructed a telescope. In the 1850s and 1860s he frequently transported his large telescope on a horse wagon to Union Square in the evening, and for a fee people could use his telescope to observe the stars. In litigations of the year 1893 many persons remembered the telescope-man.

On March 23, 1865, he took the oath on the Constitution of the United States and was henceforth an American citizen, signing with Henry Goebel. The anglicisation of his name took place sometime after 1852.

On May 9, 1865, Göbel obtained U.S. Patent No. 47632 (Hemmer for sewing machines). He probably got the idea when thinking about how to make the sewing work of his daughter more easy. However, he was not successful in monetising the patent. (Note: In his affidavit from January 21, 1893 in the litigation Edicon Electric Light Co. vs. Bacon Vacuum Pump and Electrical Co. Goebel said, cost und problems with this patent was the reason he did not apply for further patents related to his alleged work in the field of incandesscent light bulbs in those years.)

Göbel moved his shop to Grand Street 500 in 1872 and to Grand Street 468 in 1877.

In 1881, Göbel Goebel worked for the American Electric Light Co. for half a year, where there was a need for precision mechanics for the construction of electric lamps. He also produced carbon filaments in his shop for the company. He then tried to start his own business in the field of incandescent light bulbs with his friend John Kulenkamp. Both were members of a Lodge of Freemasons of German immigrants.

On April 30, 1882, the New York Times reported on an exhibition of incandescent light bulbs in Göbel's shop. According to this report, Göbel claimed the electric light was by no means as new an invention as it was popularly supposed to be, and that he knew this kind of light since his time in Germany. He affirmed he produced electric lights since the 1850s, without giving technical details. The lamps on exhibition were incandescent light bulbs with carbon-filaments of high resistance, made of fibres of reed.

Two patents were granted to Heinrich Göbel in 1882: an improvement of the Geissler system of vacuum pumps, and a solution to connect carbon-filaments and metal-wires in a light bulb.

In 1882, Göbel offered to sell his inventions to the Edison Electric Light Co. for a few thousand dollars, but Edison did not see enough merit in the invention to accept the offer.

In the 1880s, some patent attorneys visited Göbel because of the 1882 story in the New York Times. They were interested in early incandescent light bulbs to put Edison's patent of 1880 into question. Later, they said, there was not much evidence, and Göbel was not able to present old lamps.

In 1887, Göbel's wife Sofie died. They had at least eight more children in the US; seven of whom survived both parents. Göbel retired in the late 1880s, and his son Henry became the owner of the shop.

In 1893, New York patent attorneys Witter & Kenyon became defense counsel in three cases of patent infringement, with Göbel becoming their primary witness and used his 1882 story to create the Göbel defense. Lawsuits using the Göbel defense continued until May 1894.

Heinrich Göbel died on December 4, 1893, from pneumonia. He was buried at Green-Wood Cemetery.

The work for the American Electric Light Co. in 1881, the patents from 1882, and the report in the New York Times from April 30, 1882 are the earliest clear sources for work of Heinrich Göbel related to incandescent electric light bulbs. No earlier source is known to prove any kind of relation with incandescent light bulbs, nor indeed any kind of work in the field of electricity.

== The claimed Göbel anticipation concerning Edison's incandescent light bulb patents ==
=== Litigation using the "Göbel defense" in 1893 and 1894 ===
Decisions in the suits with Goebel-Defense
Feb. 18, 1893	Beacon Vacuum Pump and Electric Company, Boston, preliminary injunction granted (Judge Lebaron B. Colt)
Apr. 21, 1893	Columbia Incandescent Lamp Company, St. Louis, preliminary injunction denied (Judge Moses Hallett)
Jul. 20, 1893	Electric Manufacturing Company, Oconto, preliminary injunction granted (Court in Milwaukee; Judge William H. Seaman)
Jan. 26, 1894	Philadelphia Trust Co., Manufacturers' Club of Philadelphia und Spreckels Sugar-Refining Co., preliminary injunction granted, Philadelphia (Judge Acheson)
May 1, 1894	Electric Manufacturing Company, Oconto, preliminary injunction confirmed, appeal, (Court in Chicago; Judge James G. Jenkins)
Jan. 11, 1895	Philadelphia Trust Co, Philadelphia, preliminary injunction confirmed, appeal, (Judge Wales)
no final hearing
Nov. 19, 1894	Expiry date of US Patent 223.898 of the Edison Electric Light Co. (since 1893 General Electric); Patent applied November 30, 1879/ granted January 27, 1880

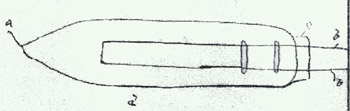
Drawing of Göbel lamp No. 1. Source: Affidavit Henry Goebel January 21, 1893

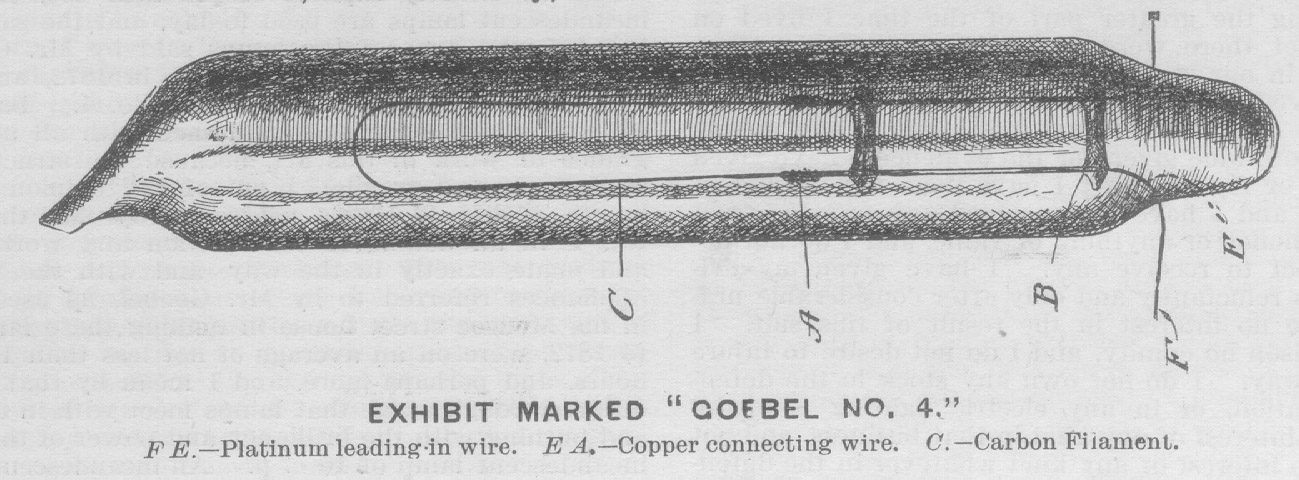
Goebel-Lamp No. 4. Henry Goebel said, he had made this lamp prior to 1872. This lamp was considered to anticipate the Edison patent, assumed the date of production was fully proved. Goebel-Lamps No. 1,2 and 3 were subject of technical discussions whether they anticipate the invention of Thomas Edison.

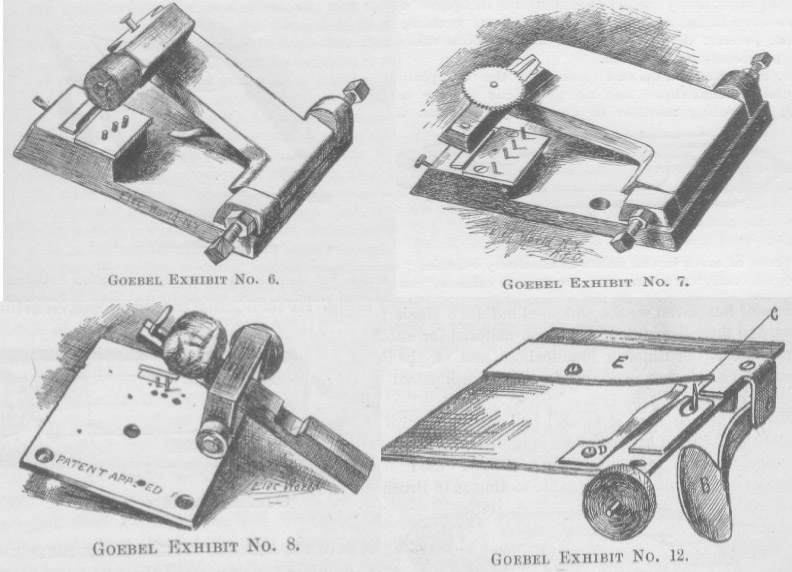
Tools for the production of thin carbon-filaments, presented at court 1893. Henry Goebel affirmed the construction and usage of these tools in the 1870s.

In 1892, the litigation Edison Electric Light Co. vs. United States Electric Lighting Co. from 1885 came to a final decision. The court confirmed the patents of Thomas Edison related to the incandescent light bulb.

Based on this decision, Edison Electric brought suits to obtain preliminary injunctions to close the productions of incandescent light bulbs of the Beacon Vacuum Pump and Electrical Company, Boston; Columbia Incandescent Lamp Company, St. Louis; and Electric Manufacturing Company, Oconto, Wisconsin.

Patent attorneys Witter & Kenyon became defense counsel in all three cases. They declared Edison's patents void because it was not a novelty in 1880. Their witness, Heinrich Göbel, made a claim he had designed the first practical incandescent electric light bulb in 1854. He said he had used his lamps for personal purpose without applying for a patent. The counsels called this an "overseen invention". Göbel was an unknown person at that time.

Göbel's main evidence was discounted by U.S. patent courts. Göbel himself was the most important witness of the defendant companies. Witter & Kenyon worked out an extensive defense with several hundred pages of affidavits. So-called Original Lamps were presented at court. Witnesses said they existed earlier than 1880. Furthermore, so-called Reproduced Lamps were presented at court. Witnesses said Göbel had produced these lamps himself at Beacon Vacuum Pump and Electrical Company, using his old tools. In 1893, Heinrich Göbel was 75. He said that he had lost a lot of lamps and tools for the production of lamps when he left his shop in New York years ago.

In the case Edison Electric Light Co. vs. Columbia Incandescent Lamp Co., St. Louis 181 persons supported the Goebel-Defense providing affidavits and 142 persons supported the Edison view. The view of the Edison Electric Light Co. was Göbel did not built practical incandescent light bulbs before 1880. The counsels of the Goebel-Defense didn't provide any documentation or convincing proof which could be dated without any doubt to a time earlier than 1880, the year the patent was granted to Thomas Edison.

Many persons providing affidavits in 1893 said that they had seen the electric lamps of Henry Goebel in the 1850s to the 1870s. Henry Goebel used his lamps according to these affidavits for the advertisement of his shop in New York and for the advertisement of his telescope at Union Square, New York. Members of Goebel's family and friends of them affirmed the usage of incandescent lamps in the daily life of the family before the year 1880. The most surprising story for the public was the alleged usage of incandescent lamps for the advertisement of Goebel's telescope in the center of New York for years. It was said, thousands of New Yorkers had seen Goebel's lamps. Approximately 75 witnesses confirmed this in affidavits; approximately the same number of witnesses remembered oil-lamps only.

Goebel claimed his lamp contained a high resistance filament of carbon, platinum lead-in wires in an all-glass envelope, and a high vacuum produced with the Torricellian method using mercury. He tried several materials to produce the carbon filaments and discovered the advantages of bamboo. These solutions were exactly the results of the research work of the Edison Electric Light Co. and the novelties of Edison's patents.

Technical experts of both sides gave their opinion about the Goebel lamps and the claimed way of production in affidavits. Experts of the Edison side contested the quality of the lamps and the possibility to produce lamps using the affirmed procedure. Experts of the Goebel-Defense confirmed the quality of the lamps and the method of production. Witnesses of the Goebel-Defense said, that reproduced lamps burnt 45, 87 and 166 hours. Edison's lamps burnt at time of applying for a patent approximately 40 hours. So-called Goebel Original Lamps were broken in 1893. Experts of the Edison side said that they never burnt.

Lewis Latimer, an employee of the Edison Electric Light Co. and responsible to support their counsels, discredited Goebel by demonstrating that his supposed 1870s bulb (Goebel Lamp No. 4) had been built much later. Professor van der Weyde, an 80 years old physicist, said in his affidavit, he had seen Goebel's telescope and his incandescent lamps. Later he withdrew his affidavit. Witter & Kenyon expressed suspicions of bribery of witnesses. The newspapers reported about some turbulent phases in these lawsuits during the year 1893.

Judge Colt (Edison Electric Light Co. vs. Beacon Vacuum Pump and Electrical Company, Boston) explained how he ruled based on probabilities:

It is extremely improbable that Henry Goebel constructed a practical incandescent lamp in 1854. This is manifest from the history of the art for the past fifty years, the electrical laws which since that time have been discovered as applicable to the incandescent lamp, the imperfect means which then existed for obtaining a vacuum, the high degree of skill necessary in the construction of all its parts, and the crude instruments with which Goebel worked. It has often been laid down that a meritorious invention is not to be defeated by something which rests in speculation or experiment, or which is rudimentary or incomplete. The law requires not conjecture, but certainty. It is easy after an important invention has gone into public use for persons to come forward with claims that they invented the same thing years before, and to endeavor to establish this by the recollection of witnesses as to events long past. Such evidence is to be received with great caution, and the presumption of novelty arising from the grant of the patent is not to be overcome except upon clear and convincing proof.

The opinion of Judge Hallett in the case Edison Electric Light Co. vs. Columbia Incandescent Lamp Co., St. Louis:

It is said that Goebel is involved in contradictions and misstatements of fact, due to the lapsing memory of old age, or to untruthfulness. Be it so. He does not appear to be an adventurer or an impostor. It is not reasonable to believe that he made the story related in his affidavit, and did not make the lamp he has described. Whatever may be said as to Goebel's veracity, he is supported at many points by witnesses of good repute, who speak with precision, and apparently with deliberation. ... I need not refer to the possible effect of cross-examination in the case of a multitude of witnesses. What now seems plain enough may altogether disappear, and new facts may come to the surface under that crucial test. ... The injunction will therefore be refused, if the respondents shall give a bond in the sum of $20,000, conditioned for the payment of such sum, if any, as may be decreed in favor of complainants on the final hearing of this cause.

The opinion of Judge Seaman in the case Edison Electric Light Co. vs. Electric Manufacturing Co., Milwaukee:

Prof. Thomson, of the Thomson-Houston Company, investigated it in 1882, -when it would have been of vital interest to his company to make use of it against this patent, if tenable, -and, after visiting Goebel, rejected its consideration. Dr. O. A. Moses, an inventor, with similar object, visited Goebel frequently, but came to the same conclusion, and says he was unable to produce any lamps. These are potent circumstances to raise doubt. ... One Hager, a glass blower, swears that he made for Goebel, while working with him, "in the early eighties," lamps similar to No.4, and he thinks he made this one at that time. ... Upon the whole showing, I am satisfied that the complainants are legally entitled to preliminary injunction, and that it is the duty of the court to grant it without evasion.

The opinion of Judge Jenkins in the case Electric Manufacturing Co. vs. Edison Electric Light Co., appeal, Chicago was based on the last development of the Goebel-Defense with new affidavits and withdrawn affidavits in May, 1894:

Without assuming to say that the story of this invention is untrue, and without designing to suggest what result should be reached upon final hearing, we are compelled to say that the story is surrounded by such an atmosphere of improbability that, until it shall have been thoroughly sifted and sustained upon final hearing, the claim ought not to be permitted to invade the monopoly accorded to, another for the same invention, whose claim has passed safely the ordeal of judicial scrutiny.

A decision, whether the Goebel anticipation was held true or untrue, required a final hearing, but there was never a final hearing in the litigations using the Goebel-Defense. It was the responsibility of the Edison Electric Light Co. to move the case in St. Louis to a final hearing. Probably they did it not because of the expiry date of Edison's patent in 1894 and high cost.

It is not sure, that the proof of the alleged anticipation was the true strategy of the counsels of the defense. Perhaps the aim of the extensive Goebel-Defense was to avoid a decision of a final hearing before the expiry date of Edison's patent. This was successful in the case of the Columbia Incandescent Lamp Co. The company produced lamps without interruption though they never proved the invalidity of Edison's patent.

In two cases the preliminary injunction was granted, in one case the injunction was denied. In Philadelphia another injunction was granted in a suit filed by the Edison Electric Light Co. to stop the usage of patent infringing lamps at some companies. The counsels of the defense in this case used the arguments of the Goebel-Defense. The judges referred to the previous decisions. They did not form their own opinion about the Goebel claim of anticipation.

The point of controversy in these lawsuits between the Edison Electric Light Co. and their competitors was money. It was not a controversy about the honor to be the inventor of the incandescent light bulb. There was no benefit for Henry Goebel in these suits. He said, he was not interested in the decisions of the courts and that he had no hostile mind towards Thomas Edison. In an affidavit he said he got no money for providing details of his work concerning incandescent lamps.

The claim of the Goebel Defense fulfilled the legal requirements for challenging the Edison patent without having to assert any influence or effect of the alleged invention outside the private sphere of Goebel. An invention with merit of technical progress for the benefit of the general public, however, was not claimed.

=== Historical extrajudicial investigations and views on the anticipation claim ===
During the litigations most newspapers reported with a neutral point of view, but some raised doubts about the alleged Goebel anticipation.

"A romantic story of the poor inventor Goebel which will be forgotten soon" was the commentary of a technical magazine in Germany.

The journalist A. M. Tanner from London visited Springe, Göbel's native town, and interviewed some people there. In his article published in The Electrical Review in February 1894 he wrote, that nobody had confirmed the alleged work of Göbel related to electricity before leaving Germany. Tanner reported that Göbel's alleged teacher in the field of electricity and electric lamps, Professor Münchhausen, was an unknown person in Springe and Hanover. Göbel said in one of his affidavits that he had learned the professions of a watchmaker and an optician. In Springe Tanner got the information, that Göbel had learned the profession of a locksmith.

=== Investigations in recent years ===
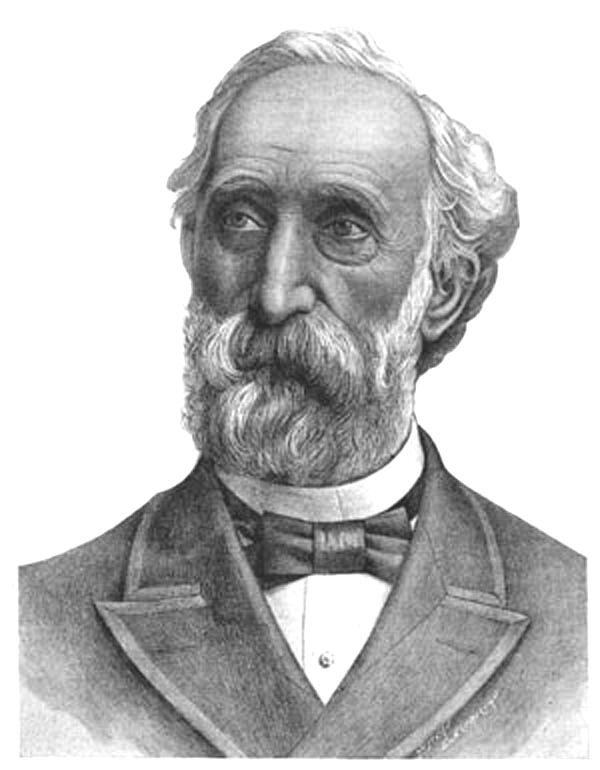
Henry Goebel, photo published in Western Electrician on the head page of the issue dec 16, 1893 reporting his death

Investigations in recent years partially corroborated the findings in the article by Tanner.

One important point is, that there is no source to confirm Goebel's alleged source of knowledge in the fields of electricity and vacuum physics. Goebel claimed that he had worked together with a certain Professor Münchhausen in the 1840s, that he had constructed equipment for experiments at today's Leibniz University Hannover (at that time called Höhere Gewerbeschule), that he had assisted experiments related to electric light, that he had got the idea and the basic concept of the design of an electric incandescent lamp from Professor Münchhausen and that he had continued with experiments on electric light on his own in New York. A person Professor Münchhausen was not known in the Kingdom of Hanover in the 1830s and 1840s, there is no documentation of experiments on electric light in the Kingdom of Hanover in the 1840s and no source for deliveries of equipment or any other kind of relation of Henry Goebel to today's Leibniz University Hannover.

As one result of investigations in Germany and in the US and an analysis of all documents of the litigations with Goebel-Defense Hans-Christian Rohde stated in his dissertation, that there is no source from the time prior to 1880 to support the assumption of a relation of Henry Goebel to incandescent lamps prior to 1880. His thesis is, that Henry Goebel got the knowledge when working for the American Electric Light Co. in 1881 and was not busy with incandescent lamps before.

A philological analysis of all affidavits of the Goebel-Defense manifested numerous contradictions and improbabilities. This and the lack of independent sources in the archives to confirm claims of Henry Goebel support the thesis, the Goebel-Defense was fraudulent. Probably Goebel told his story in 1882 to present himself as experienced in the art of construction of electric lamps to promote his intended business. Patent attorneys and their technical consultants created the Goebel-Defense on base of this story. Probably a biography of an inventor of electric light was constructed on top of the true biography of Henry Goebel. There is circumstantial evidence that falsification of written affidavits was part of the strategy of the counsels of the defense.

One curious matter is the name of Goebel's alleged teacher, Professor Münchhausen. Münchhausen is a rare family name in Germany and Münchhausen is the name of a literary figure in a collection of tales with title The Surprising Adventures of Baron Munchausen of Rudolf Erich Raspe (published 1785) and in another version of Gottfried August Bürger (published 1786), a popular book in Germany; a man telling lies and incredible stories. A thesis on this is, that Henry Goebel, an old man, was under pressure of lawyers to provide affidavits and got pangs of conscience and this was his way to indicate the story was untrue. In the culture of Germany there is a close association of "Münchhausen" and "untrue, telling lies".

So-called Goebel Original Lamps are in the archives of the Henry Ford Museum, Dearborn. A technical examination with today's methods of science to establish, if possible, a final truth on the production year of the lamps and to clear up technical points of dispute in the litigations did not take place yet.

== The Göbel-Legend ==
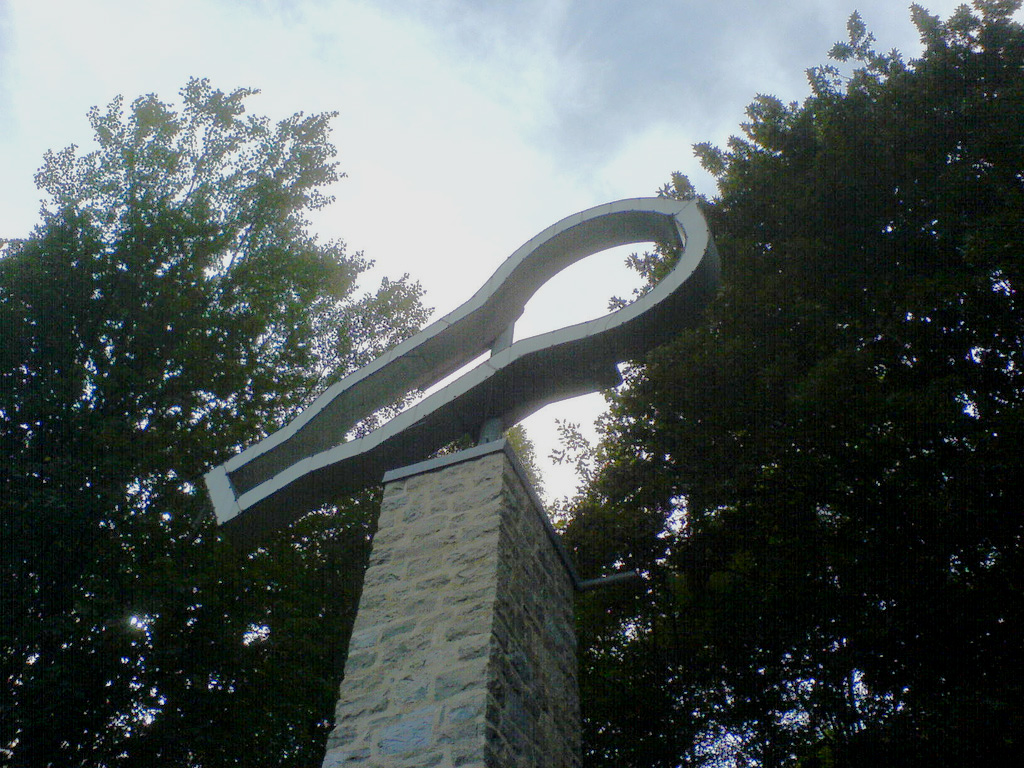
Monument in honor of Göbel near Springe, Germany, constructed in 1954, the believed 100th anniversary of his invention

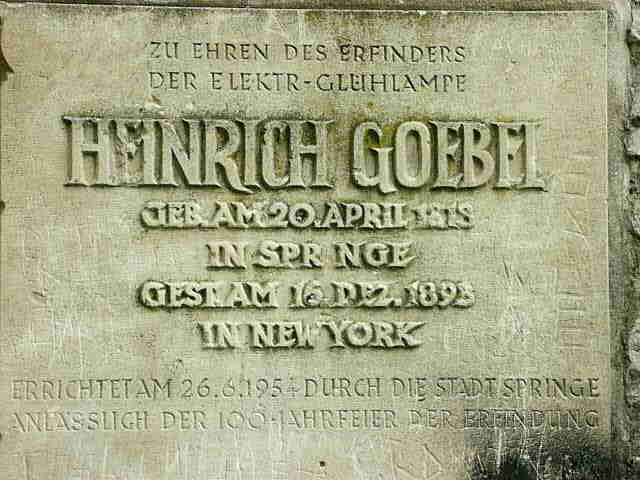
Monument from 1954 in honor of Göbel as the "inventor of the electric light bulb". The date of death in the monument inscription is December 16, 1893; The Electrical World reported the death of Göbel on December 4th in the issue of December 16th. In Germany the date of issue was erroneously reported as the date of his death in a significant 1923 article about Göbel, which is the reason for the incorrect date of death in the monument inscription.

Franklin Leonard Pope was a close friend of Thomas Alva Edison but later he was in quarrel with him.

He was an important man with a good reputation in the field of electricity; in 1886 he was the President of the American Institute of Electrical Engineers.

In January 1893 Franklin Pope wrote an article published on the head page of the Electrical Engineer titled The Carbon Filament Lamp of 1859—The Story of an Overlooked Invention. In this article Franklin Pope credited the invention of the practical incandescent light bulb to Henry Goebel. Furthermore, he supported the Goebel-Defense at court providing affidavits.

Probably his relationship to Thomas Edison was the motivation of Franklin Pope.

The reputation of Franklin Pope and his article in The Electrical Engineer is the reason for the existing view in some countries that Henry Goebel developed a carbon filament lamp many years before Thomas Edison did it. The Electrical Engineer is available in the libraries of many technical universities. Franklin Pope's article was interpreted as a reliable source as well in the year of publishing as in later years. In 1893 his article was the source for reports about the Goebel-Story of newspapers in the US and in Europe.

As a matter of fact there is a lack of convincing evidence for the information about the lamps of Henry Goebel given by Franklin Pope in his article. This was the result of the litigations (motions for a preliminary injunction) in three cases in 1893 and 1894.

In a dissertation published 2007 it is stated, that the article was part of the fraudulent Goebel-Defense and the intention was to produce credibility for the Goebel-Story and sympathy for Henry Goebel, an "underdog" who anticipated the famous Thomas Edison. According to this view, Franklin Pope was a fraudulent acting consultant of the Goebel Defense.

Franklin Pope wrote a book titled Evolution of the Electric Incandescent Lamp. In the 2nd Edition of this book, published 1894 one year after his article about Henry Goebel in the Electrical Engineer of January 1893, Henry Goebel is not mentioned.

In the case Edison Electric Light Co. vs. Columbia Incandescent Lamp Co. Judge Moses Hallett denied the granting of a preliminary injunction. His opinion was, that a final hearing with all witnesses at court was necessary. Several magazines and newspapers stated that Judge Hallett believed Goebel's lamp preceded Edison's. In Germany the opinion of Judge Hallett was reported to be a final decision in the case. Sometimes it wasn't realized that the litigations were three independent cases with the same counsels of the defense using the same arguments. Due to this erroneous view the later decision of Judge Hallett was reported as a decision of a higher court in the same case. That are misstatements of Judge Hallett's decision, and the source of the legend that the priority of Henry Goebel for the invention of the practical incandescent light bulb was established at court.

After his death, Henry Goebel had been forgotten for 30 years in Germany. In the year 1923 the story of an important national inventor was created; the report of Franklin Pope was the main source. Some other countries adapted the story from Germany in the 20th century. Additional misstatements became part of some versions of the legend. For example, some versions of the legend describe the first Goebel lamps as bottle-lamps. But Henry Goebel said that he had melted the glass of Eau-de-Cologne-Bottles with a blowpipe to produce the all-glass-envelope of his very first lamps in the 1850s.

Different views became obvious due to the internet and some projects in the US and in Germany started investigations in the year 2000 and later. As a result, the assumption of Goebel lamps prior to 1880 without any doubt was named a legend.

== US-Patents granted to Henry Goebel ==
- Patent 47632, Hemmer for Sewing Machines, May 9, 1865.
- Patent 252.658 "Vacuum Pump (Improvement of the Geissler-System of vacuum pumps", January 24, 1882
- Patent 266.358 "Electric Incandescent Lamp (sockets to connect the filament of carbon and the conducting wires)", October 24, 1882

== See also ==
- List of German inventors and discoverers

== Bibliography ==
- Hans-Christian Rohde: Die Göbel-Legende – Der Kampf um die Erfindung der Glühlampe. Zu Klampen, Springe 2007, ISBN 978-3-86674-006-8 (German, dissertation, research work on the biography of Henry Goebel, analysis of all documents of the Goebel-Defense available in National Record Administrations of the USA) The author explains his thesis, the Goebel claims were fraudulent.
- Decisions of the courts concerning the Goebel-Defense published in the Federal Reporter volumes f1.54, f1.56, f1.57, f1. 60, f1.61 und f1.65:
  - Edison Electric Light v. Beacon vol. 54, pg. 678
  - Edison Electric Light v. Columbia vol. 56, pg. 496
  - Edison Electric Light v. Electric, Oconto vol. 57, pg. 616
  - Electric, Oconto v. Edison Electric Light appeal vol. 61, pg. 834
  - Edison Electric Light v. Philadelphia Trust vol. 60, pg. 397
  - Philadelphia Trust v. Edison Electric Light appeal vol. 65, pg. 551
- Reports about the Goebel-Defense are available in many issues of The Electrical World and The Electrical Engineer in 1893 and 1894.
- Frank Dittmann: Heinrich Goebel – Aufstieg und Fall einer deutschen Legende. In: Technikgeschichte. 74, 2 (2007): 149–160, ISSN 0040-117X (Heinrich Goebel - rise and fall of a German legend.)
