= Messenkamp =

- Municipality
- Coat of arms

- Location of Messenkamp within Schaumburg district
- Interactive map of Messenkamp
- Location within Germany Location within Lower Saxony
- Coordinates: 52°15′39″N 9°22′53″E
- Country: Germany
- State: Lower Saxony
- District: Schaumburg
- Municipal assoc.: Rodenberg

Government
  - Mayor: Frank Witte (SPD)

Area
  - Total: 6.78 km^{2} (2.62 sq mi)
- Elevation: 108 m (354 ft)

Population (2025-12-31)
  - Total: 723
  - Density: 107/km^{2} (276/sq mi)
- Time zone: UTC+01:00 (CET)
  - Summer (DST): UTC+02:00 (CEST)
- Postal codes: 31867
- Dialling codes: 05043
- Vehicle registration: SHG

Messenkamp is a municipality in the district of Schaumburg, in Lower Saxony, Germany.
