= Rodenberg =

- Town
- Coat of arms

- Location of Rodenberg within Schaumburg district
- Interactive map of Rodenberg
- Location within Germany Location within Lower Saxony
- Coordinates: 52°19′N 9°21′E
- Country: Germany
- State: Lower Saxony
- District: Schaumburg
- Municipal assoc.: Rodenberg
- Subdivisions: 2

Government
  - Mayor: Ralf Sassmann

Area
  - Total: 15.62 km^{2} (6.03 sq mi)
- Elevation: 69 m (226 ft)

Population (2025-12-31)
  - Total: 6,274
  - Density: 401.7/km^{2} (1,040/sq mi)
- Time zone: UTC+01:00 (CET)
  - Summer (DST): UTC+02:00 (CEST)
- Postal codes: 31552
- Dialling codes: 05723
- Vehicle registration: SHG

Rodenberg (German: [ˈʁoːdn̩ˌbɛʁk]) is a town in the district of Schaumburg, in Lower Saxony, Germany. It is situated on the northwestern edge of the Deister hills, approx. 10 km east of Stadthagen, and 27 km west of Hanover.

Rodenberg is also the seat of the Samtgemeinde Rodenberg ("collective municipality").

== Geography ==
The town of Rodenberg lies between the Deister, Süntel and Bückeberg ridges. The Rodenberger Aue and Steinaue streams flow through the town. The "old Rodenberg" hill, which gives the town its name, with its landmark windmill, rises to the west of the town. Since 1974, the parish of Rodenberg includes the formerly independent parish of Algesdorf. The neighbouring village of Grove, with its church, was amalgamated with Rodenberg in 1834.

== History ==
The Rodenberg area was already inhabited in prehistoric times, among others by the Celts and Saxons. A number of burial mounds in the area also bear witness to this. The name Rodenberg refers to a hill in the west of the city, but the name is not a reference to the clearing, but to the color of the mountain - "red mountain". The first documented mention (as "Castrum Rodenbergum") dates back to the year 930, when the predecessors of the Counts of Schaumburg built a castle or a fortified tower here. It was said to be on the so-called "old Rodenberg" in the west of the town, although more details are not known. The Heisterburg in the Deister, which is assigned to Rodenberg, dates from the 10th/11th Century. The few remains of Rodenberg Castle were probably built as a moated castle by Count Adolf IV of Schaumburg between 1228 and 1240. Today's spelling "Rodenberg" was first used in 1632.

In 1250, Rodenberg was elevated to the status of "Freien Wickbold" (fortified and privileged settlement), and on April 4, 1615, it was granted town rights by Count Ernst zu Holstein and Schaumburg. In 1647 Rodenberg fell to the Landgraviate of Hesse-Kassel, since the lineage of the Counts of Schaumburg had died out with the death of Count Otto V on November 15, 1640. This was written down and fixed in 1648 in the Peace of Westphalia. In Hessen-Kassel there was the Rodenberg office. The healing spring discovered in 1718 was widely known. Saline and Gesundbrunnen in Rodenberg were generously funded before Landgrave Wilhelm IX. von Hessen-Kassel built a bathhouse near the sulfur springs in Nenndorf in 1787.

On the evening of November 5, 1859, a fire broke out in the large brewery in Rodenberg, which spread to the Rodenberg town fire. During the night, the following burned down: the large brewery, the town hall, the Jewish community center, the large office and pension building, the office gate, the prison, the other buildings in the office, the entire domain courtyard with its numerous residential and farm buildings, barns and storehouses and stables, the castle with all buildings and towers (except for the surrounding walls) and 20 town houses in the city. A part of the palace complex was preserved (albeit burned out). In the years that followed, the walls of the palace complex that were still preserved were used as a "quarry" for the Ratskeller, the district court, the relocation of the domain, for work on the saltworks and for work in Bad Nenndorf. When the demolition work was stopped, only the Estates House was left.

When Hessen became part of Prussia in 1866, the district of Rinteln (so named 1866–1904) also became Prussian. It was subordinated to the province of Hessen-Nassau until, in the course of the administrative reform of 1932, it was incorporated into the province of Hannover (also Prussian since 1866). The ecclesiastical administration followed suit, so that this part of Schaumburg - and thus also Rodenberg - belongs to the Evangelical Lutheran Church of Hanover. On the Catholic side, the change from the diocese of Fulda to the diocese of Hildesheim took place at the same time.

In the years 1927 and 1928 homeland games were held at the castle for the (delayed) 300-year celebration of the city rights. In 1990, on July 8, a large parade with historical elements took place to celebrate the 375-year city charter. In April/May/October 2015, celebrations were held to celebrate 400 years of town rights. Until December 31, 2004, Rodenberg belonged to the administrative district of Hanover, which was dissolved like all other Lower Saxony administrative districts. In 1834 the church village of Grove, neighboring to the north, was united with Rodenberg. Algesdorf was incorporated on March 1, 1974.

== Politics ==
=== Council ===
The Rodenberg City Council consists of 19 councilors. This is the fixed number for the member municipality of a joint municipality with a population between 6001 and 7000 inhabitants.Council members are elected by local elections for five-year terms. The current term of office began on November 1, 2021, and ends on October 31, 2026.

==== Council in 2021 ====
| Party | Seats in Council |
|---|---|
| WGR | 6 |
| SPD | 4 |
| CDU | 4 |
| Grüne | 2 |
| AFD | 1 |
| WRI | 1 |
| FDP | 0 |
| Linke | 0 |
