= Deister =

Hill range in Germany

Coordinates: 52°15′N 9°30′E

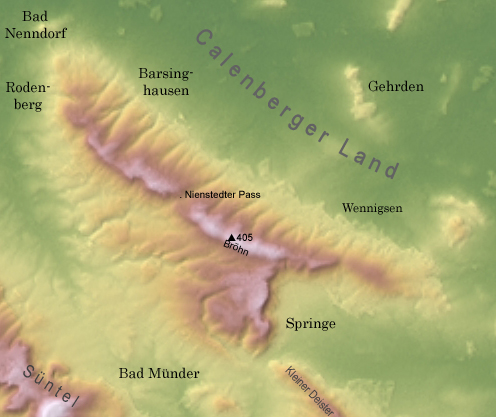
The Deister

The Deister (German pronunciation: [ˈdaɪstɐ]) is a chain of hills in the German state of Lower Saxony, about 15 mi (25 km) southwest of the city of Hanover. It runs in a north-westerly direction from Springe in the south to Rodenberg in the north. The next in the chain of hills to the south is the Kleiner Deister ("Little Deister") from which it is separated by the flat pass of the Deister Gate. It is surrounded by Springe, Wennigsen, Barsinghausen, Bad Nenndorf, Rodenberg and Bad Münder (counter-clockwise, starting in the south).

It has a total length of 21 km (14 mi), and rises in the Hofeler to a height of 395 m (1,250 ft). The highest point is the Bröhn at 405 m (1,312 ft).

The chain is well-wooded and abounds in game. From the 17th century on there were several coal mines; the last was abandoned in the 1950s. Sandstone from quarries in eastern Deister was used in several important buildings all over Europe, including the opera house in Hanover and the Reichstag in Berlin. Today the Deister is a popular target for people of the Hanover area for walking and cycling.

The Deister is a border region since ancient times. Here one can find many places with memorial stones, tumuli and ruins of castles.

== Flora and fauna ==
The ridge is covered by a mixed forest of beech and spruce and, in places, also beech and oak. On the Cecilienhöhe near Bad Nenndorf, at the picnic area of Lauenau-Feggendorf and southwest of the old forester's lodge at Köllnischfeld are several examples of the rare, native dwarf beech (Süntelbuche).

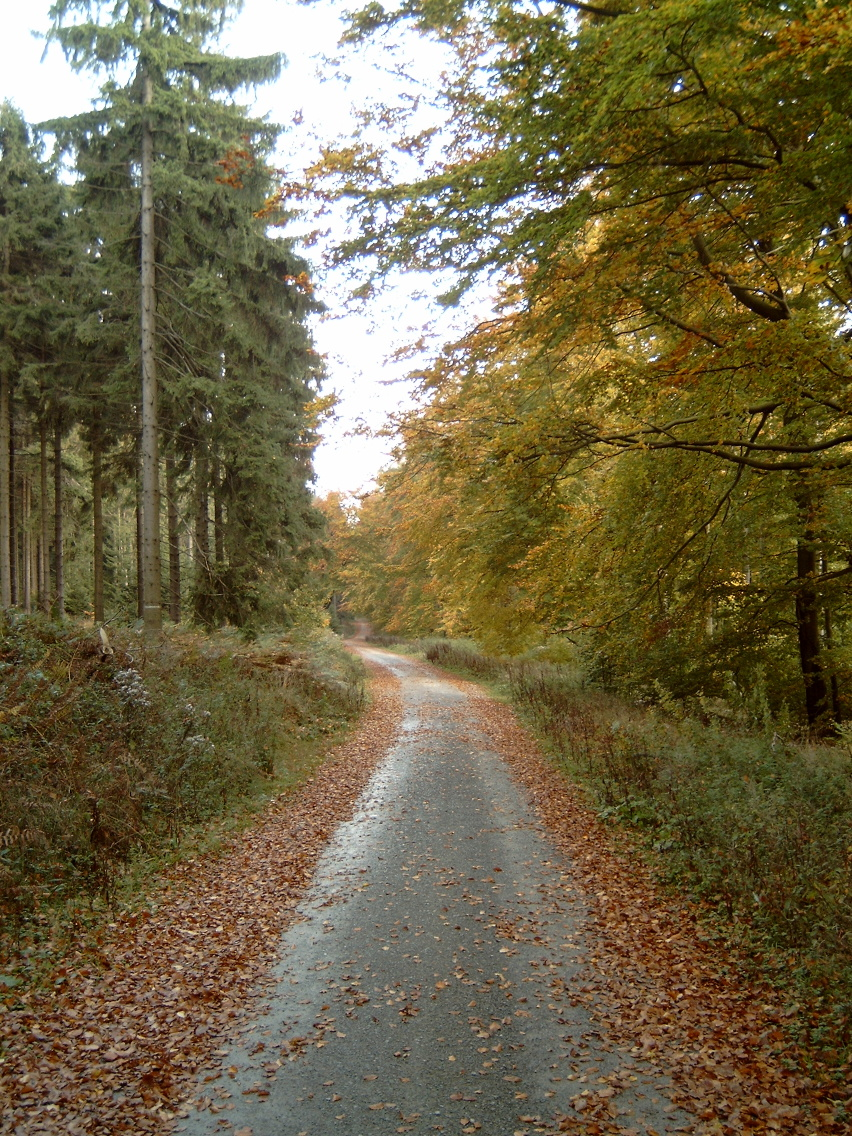
Spruce and beech wood along the Deister ridgeway

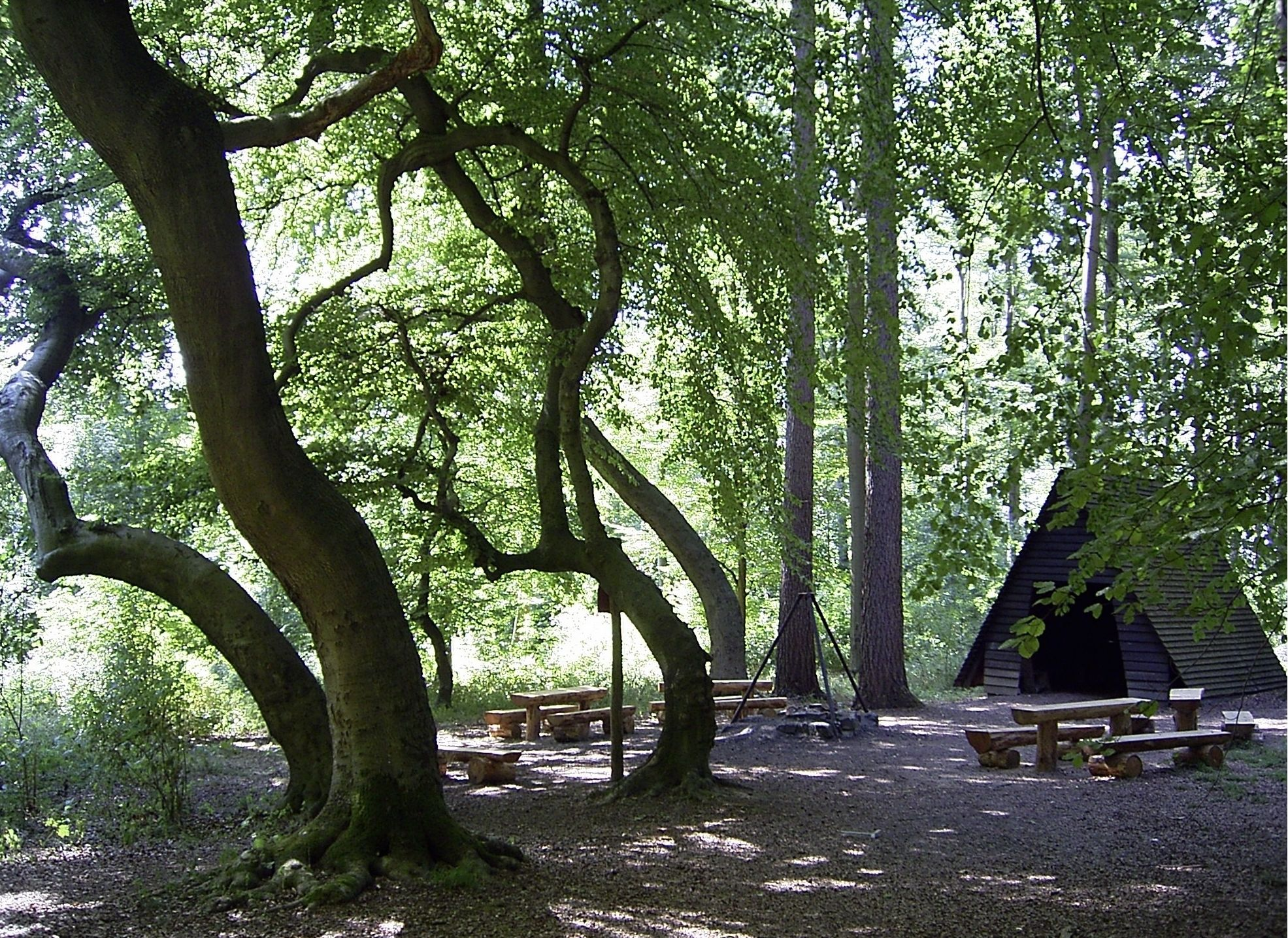
Dwarf beeches at the Feggendorf picnic site

Amongst the rarer plants on the Deister are species of holly, mezereon, orchids, sundews, globeflowers, hard shield fern, and great snowdrops.

The Deister is home to the typical animals found in the German Central Uplands. Red deer, roe deer and wild boar are very common. Other wild animals occurring here are the pine marten and beech marten, stoat, polecat, dwarf weasel and red fox. Birds of prey include the buzzard, goshawk and red kite. Rarer small animals include the mouse-eared bat and lesser horseshoe bat.

== Hills ==
Most of the hills in the Deister have a tower at the top, used for various purposes. The one on the Großer Hals is for telecommunications, while the one on the Höfeler is used for air traffic control. The others are for sightseeing and restaurants.

- Bröhn (405 m) and Anna Tower
- Höfeler (395 m) and air traffic control tower
- Reinekensiekskopf (382 m) and Nordmanns Tower
- Hohe Warte (379 m)
- Fahrenbrink (376 m)
- Großer Hals (361 m) and telecommunications tower
- Ebersberg (355 m)
- Bielstein (344 m) and refuge hut
- Egge (339 m)
- Kniggenbrink (312 m)
- Kalenberg (310 m)
- Strutzberg (198 m) and Belvedere Tower

== See also ==
- Deister Electronics
