= List of ship launches in 1772 =

The list of ship launches in 1772 includes a chronological list of some ships launched in 1772.

| Date | Ship | Class | Builder | Location | Country | Notes |
|---|---|---|---|---|---|---|
| 5 March | San Gabriel | San Pedro Apostol-class ship of the line | Reales Astilleros de Esteiro | Ferrol | Spain | For Spanish Navy. |
| 11 April | Holsteen | Holsteen-class ship of the line | F. M. Krabbe | Copenhagen | Denmark-Norway | For Dano-Norwegian Navy. |
| 18 April | Monmouth | Intrepid-class ship of the line | Israel Pownoll | Plymouth Dockyard | Great Britain | For Royal Navy. |
| 2 July | Santa Maria de la Cabeza | Fifth rate | Reales Astilleros de Esteiro | Ferrol | Spain | For Spanish Navy. |
| 31 July | Santa Perpetua | Fifth rate | Reales Astilleros de Esteiro | Ferrol | Spain | For Spanish Navy. |
| 1 August | San Juan Bautista | San Joaquin-class ship of the line | | Cartagena | Spain | For Spanish Navy. |
| 1 August | Santo Ángel de la Guarda | San Joaquin-class ship of the line | | Cartagena | Spain | For Spanish Navy. |
| 31 August | Defiance | Intrepid-class ship of the line | William Gray | Woolwich Dockyard | Great Britain | For Royal Navy. |
| 31 August | Prince George | Barfleur-class ship of the line | | Chatham Dockyard | Great Britain | For Royal Navy. |
| 17 September | Sviatoi Velikomuchenik Isidor | Sviatoi Velikomuchenik Panteleimon-class ship of the line | V. A. Selyanikov | Saint Petersburg | Russia | For Imperial Russian Navy. |
| 28 September | Royal Captain | East Indiaman | Randall | Rotherhithe | Great Britain | For Sir Richard Hotham/British East India Company. |
| 29 October | Alfred | East Indiaman | William Barnard | Deptford | Great Britain | For British East India Company. |
| 10 November | Pourvoyeuse | Pourvoyeuse-class frigate | Joseph Coubet | Lorient | Kingdom of France | For French Navy. |
| 10 November | Protée | Artésien-class ship of the line | | Brest | Kingdom of France | For French Navy. |
| 24 November | Concordia | San Michiel Archangelo-class ship of the line | | Venice | Republic of Venice | For Venetian Navy. |
| 27 November | Bessborough | East Indiaman | John Randall | Rotherhithe | Great Britain | For British East India Company. |
| 2 December | Pobedoslav Dunaiskii | Pobedoslav Dunaiskii-class schooner | M. I. Ryabinin | Danube | Unknown | For Imperial Russian Navy. |
| 9 December | Argo | Fourth rate | John May | Amsterdam | Dutch Republic | For Dutch Navy. |
| 10 December | Éveillé | Artesien-class ship of the line | Joseph-Louis Ollivier | Brest | Kingdom of France | For French Navy. |
| Unknown date | Anka-yı Bahri | Third rate | | Constantinople | Ottoman Empire | For Ottoman Navy. |
| Unknown date | Ariadne | Full-rigged ship | | | Kingdom of France | For private owner. |
| Unknown date | Berid-i Fütuh | Fifth rate | | Kemer | Ottoman Empire | For Ottoman Navy. |
| Unknown date | Bodrum | Fifth rate | | Bodrum | Ottoman Empire | For Ottoman Navy. |
| Unknown date | Britannia | East Indiaman | | Bombay Dockyard | India | For British East India Company. |
| Unknown date | Britannia | Brig | | South Carolina | Thirteen Colonies | For private owner. |
| Unknown date | Cacciatore | Xebec | | | Republic of Venice | For Venetian Navy. |
| Unknown date | Dankbaarheid | East Indiaman | | Rotterdam | Dutch Republic | For Dutch East India Company. |
| Unknown date | Dannebroge | Holsteen-class ship of the line | | | Denmark-Norway | For Dano-Norwegian Navy. |
| Unknown date | Daresbury | Mersey flat | Samuel Edwards | Liverpool | Great Britain | For private owner. |
| Unknown date | Duke of Kingston | East Indiaman | John Perry | Blackwall Yard | Great Britain | For British East India Company. |
| Unknown date | Eagle | Packet ship | John Wells | Deptford | Great Britain | For British East India Company. |
| Unknown date | Fly | Slave ship | | Liverpool | Great Britain | For private owner. |
| Unknown date | Harland | Schooner | | Bombay | India | For Bombay Pilot Service. |
| Unknown date | Marguerite | Gabarre | | Brest | Kingdom of France | For French Navy. |
| Unknown date | Louisa | Full-rigged ship | | Bombay | India | For private owner. |
| Unknown date | Mansuriye | Third rate | | Sinop | Ottoman Empire | For Ottoman Navy. |
| Unknown date | Mesudiye | Third rate | | Sinop | Ottoman Empire | For Ottoman Navy. |
| Unknown date | Necm-i Zafer | Fifth rate | | Kemer | Ottoman Empire | For Ottoman Navy. |
| Unknown date | Nuestra Señora de Montserrat | Fifth rate | Reales Astilleros de Esteiro | Ferrol | Spain | For Spanish Navy. |
| Unknown date | Pastoriza | Schooner | Reales Astilleros de Esteiro | Ferrol | Spain | For Spanish Navy. |
| Unknown date | Perr-i Bahri | Fifth rate | | Kemer | Ottoman Empire | For Ottoman Navy. |
| Unknown date | Santa Amalia | Fifth rate | Reales Astilleros de Esteiro | Ferrol | Spain | For Spanish Navy. |
| Unknown date | Sayyad-ı Bahri | Fifth rate | | Kemer | Ottoman Empire | For Ottoman Navy. |
| Unknown date | Star | Sloop | Nicholas Bools | Bridport | Great Britain | For William Leman. |
| Unknown date | Steinhuder Hecht | Submarine | | Wilhelmstein | Hanover | For William, Count of Schaumburg-Lippe. |
| Unknown date | Tritone | Xebec | | | Republic of Venice | For Venetian Navy. |
