= Steinhude =

Village at shore of Lake Steinhude, Germany

- Ortsteil of Wunstorf
- Interactive map of Steinhude
- Location within Germany Location within Lower Saxony
- Coordinates: 52°27′23″N 9°21′48″E
- Country: Germany
- State: Lower Saxony
- District: Hanover
- Town: Wunstorf
- Elevation: 44 m (144 ft)

Population (2008-12-31)
  - Total: 4,895
- Time zone: UTC+01:00 (CET)
  - Summer (DST): UTC+02:00 (CEST)
- Postal codes: 31515
- Dialling codes: 05033

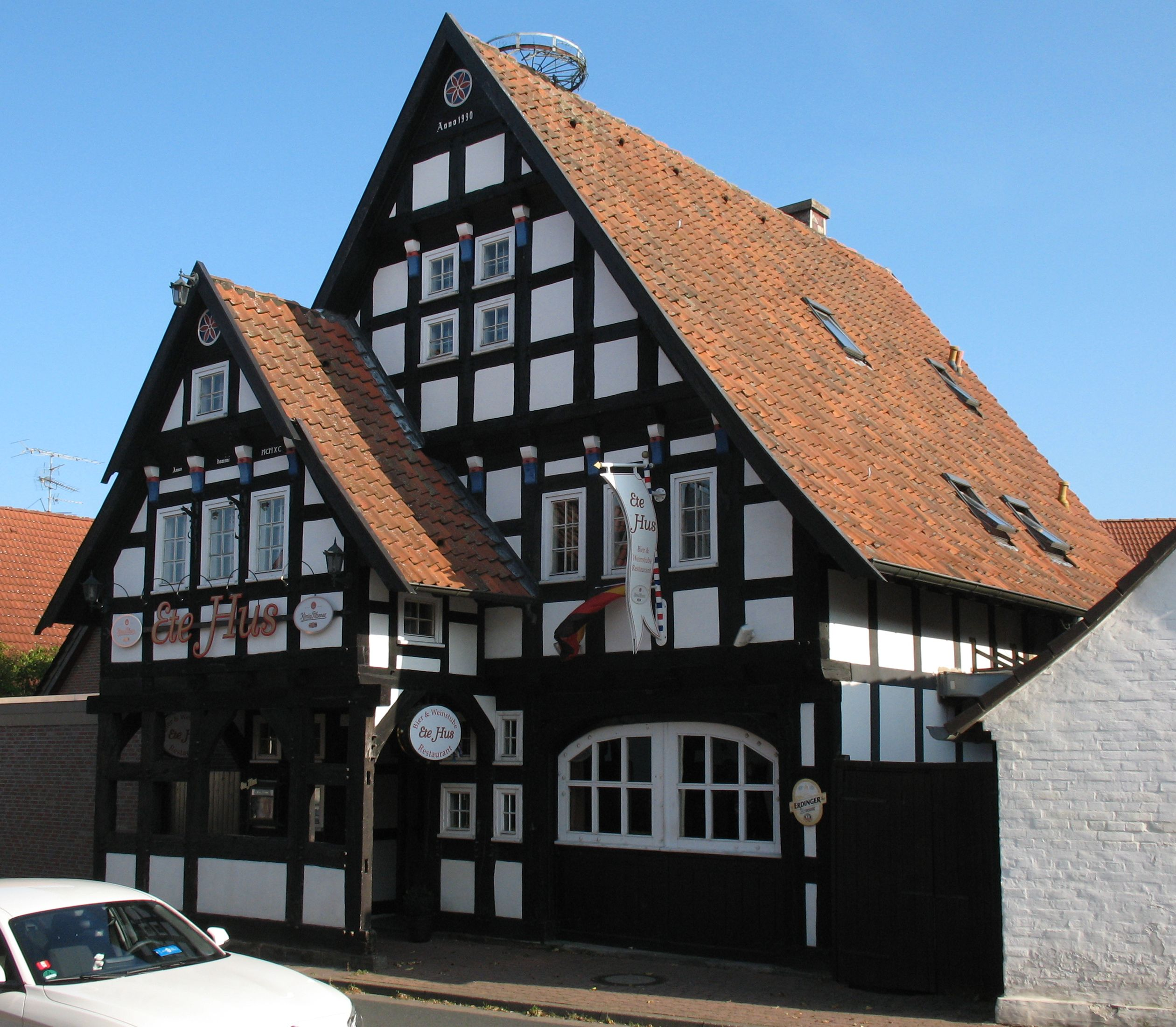
Alcove house Ete Hus

Steinhude is a village in the borough of Wunstorf in Hanover Region in the German state of Lower Saxony. It is a tourist resort on the southern shore of Lake Steinhude. Once a small, quiet fishing village, today Steinhude is well known as a recreation centre in the Steinhuder Meer Nature Park.

== Location ==
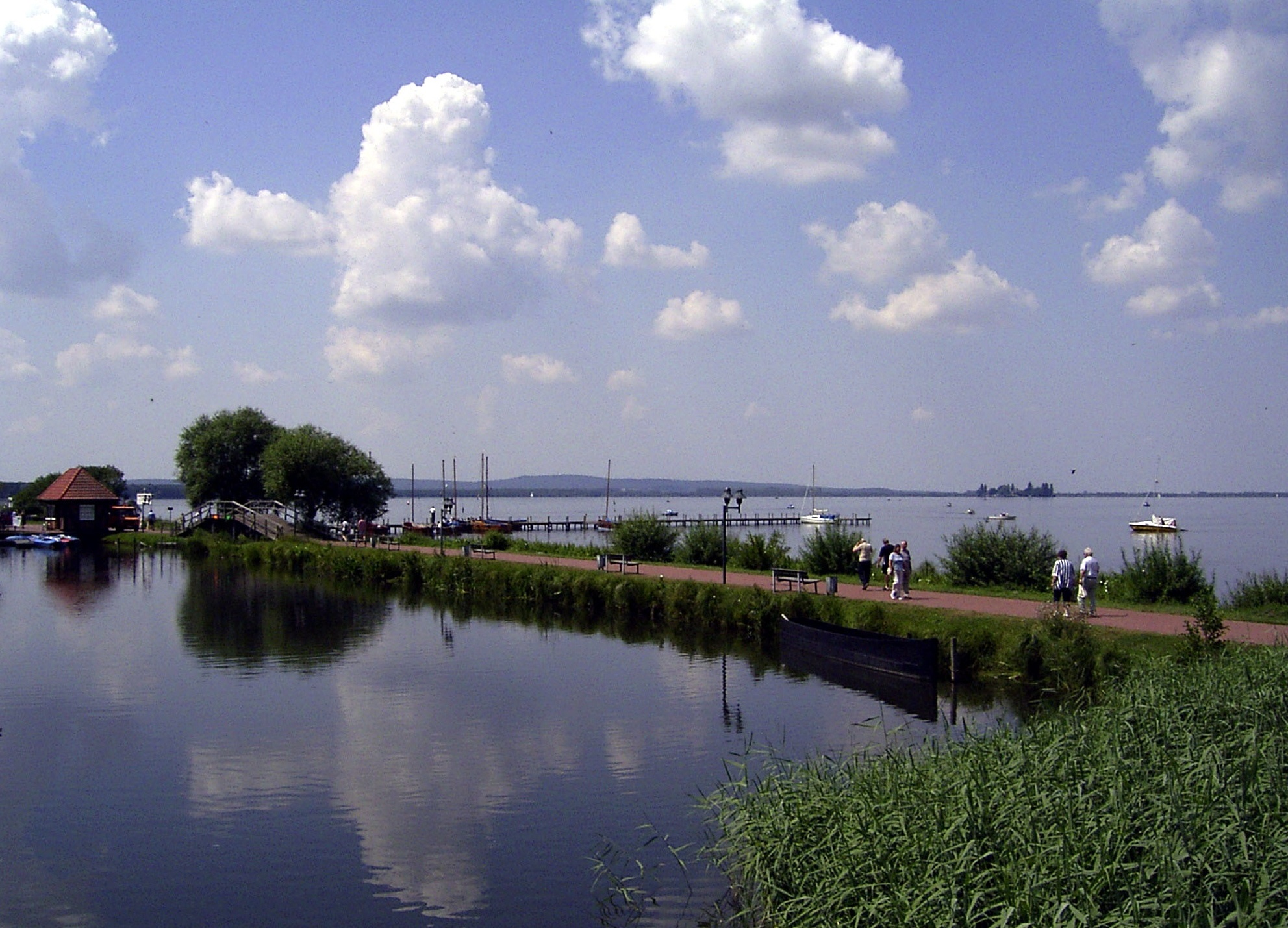
The beach pier at Steinhude

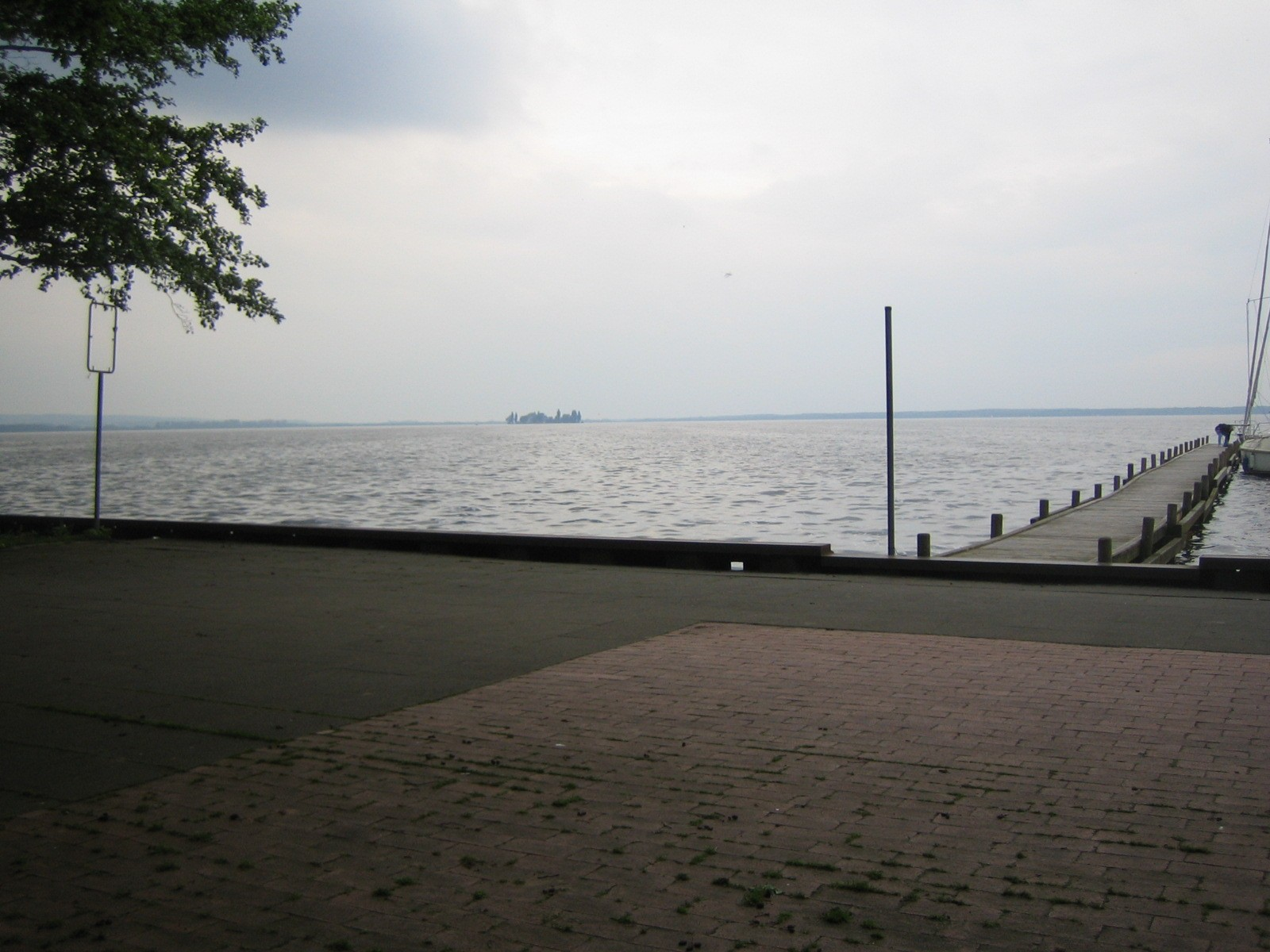
Wilhelmstein fort seen from Steinhude

Steinhude lies on the southern shore of Lake Steinhude. To the east, the fishing village has grown and merged with its neighbouring village of Großenheidorn. To the south is the B 441 federal road and a small copse, the Hoheholz. Another landmark to the south is the 140-metre-high (460 ft) potash heap near Bokeloh. Steinhude is linked to its western neighbour, Hagenburg, by a 1.5-kilometre-long (0.93 mi) lakeside promenade.

== History ==
The shore of Lake Steinhude has been settled since early times. Steinhude itself was first mentioned in records at the end of the 13th century as Stenhuthe. The small settlement lived by farming the land and fishing and, in the 17th century, became a market town. In 1641, during the Thirty Years War, the fishing village was almost totally destroyed. In the 18th century, linen weaving became the most important source of income. There was a chocolate factory in Steinhude as early as the mid-18th century, one of the first in Germany.

Administratively, Steinhude belonged to the Amt of Hagenburg and was ruled by the counts of Schaumburg. Following the division of that county in 1640, Steinhude became part of the county of Schaumburg-Lippe.

In the period 1761–1767, Count William I of Schaumburg-Lippe had the fort of Wilhelmstein built on an artificial island in the lake.

In the 20th century the small village began to expand into a tourist resort. An influx of refugees after the Second World War, the increase in tourism, and a modest upturn in the economy led to significant growth in the size of the place.

After the Second World War in 1945 there were several major changes in the appearance of the village and surrounding landscape. Another artificial island, the 3.5-hectare (8.6-acre) 'swimming island' (Badeinsel), was built in 1974–75. Between Steinhude and Hagenburg an embankment was constructed and made into a lakeside promenade. Until 1964 the Steinhude Lake Railway (Steinhuder Meer-Bahn or StMB), a narrow gauge railway, ran from Wunstorf to Uchte, through Steinhude.

The Schaumburg municipality of Steinhude was incorporated into the borough of Wunstorf in the district of Hanover as part of the regional reform of 1974. In 2001 Hanover district became Hanover Region.

== Religions ==
Steinhude has an Evangelical-Lutheran church, a Roman Catholic church and a New Apostolic Church parish.

== Coats-of-arms ==
The silver nettle leaf on a red shield was used by the counts of Schaumburg in their coat-of-arms beginning in the 12th century. The fish is a symbol of the former importance of Steinhude as a fishing village.

Formerly the two symbols were both shown on the same shield. Today they are each on their own shield.

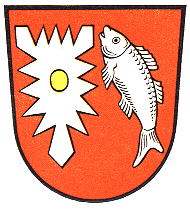
Old coat-of-arms

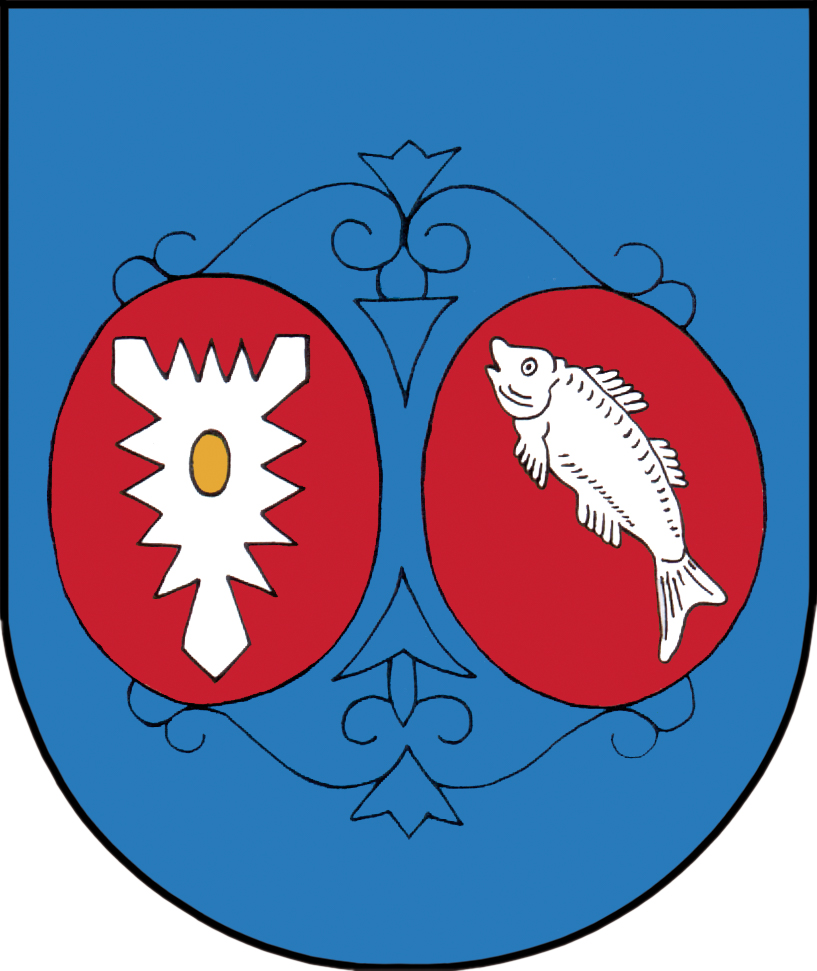
Current coat-of-arms

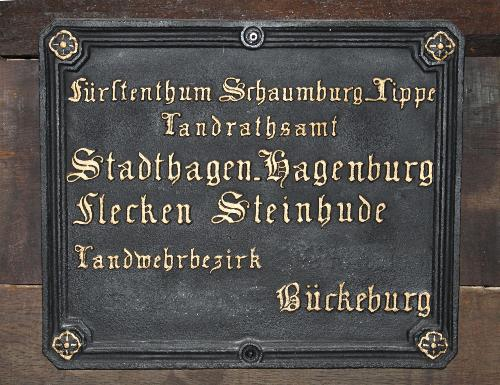
Historic city entrance sign, around 1800

In addition, there is a variation of the coat-of-arms that only contains the fish symbol.

== Culture and places of interest ==
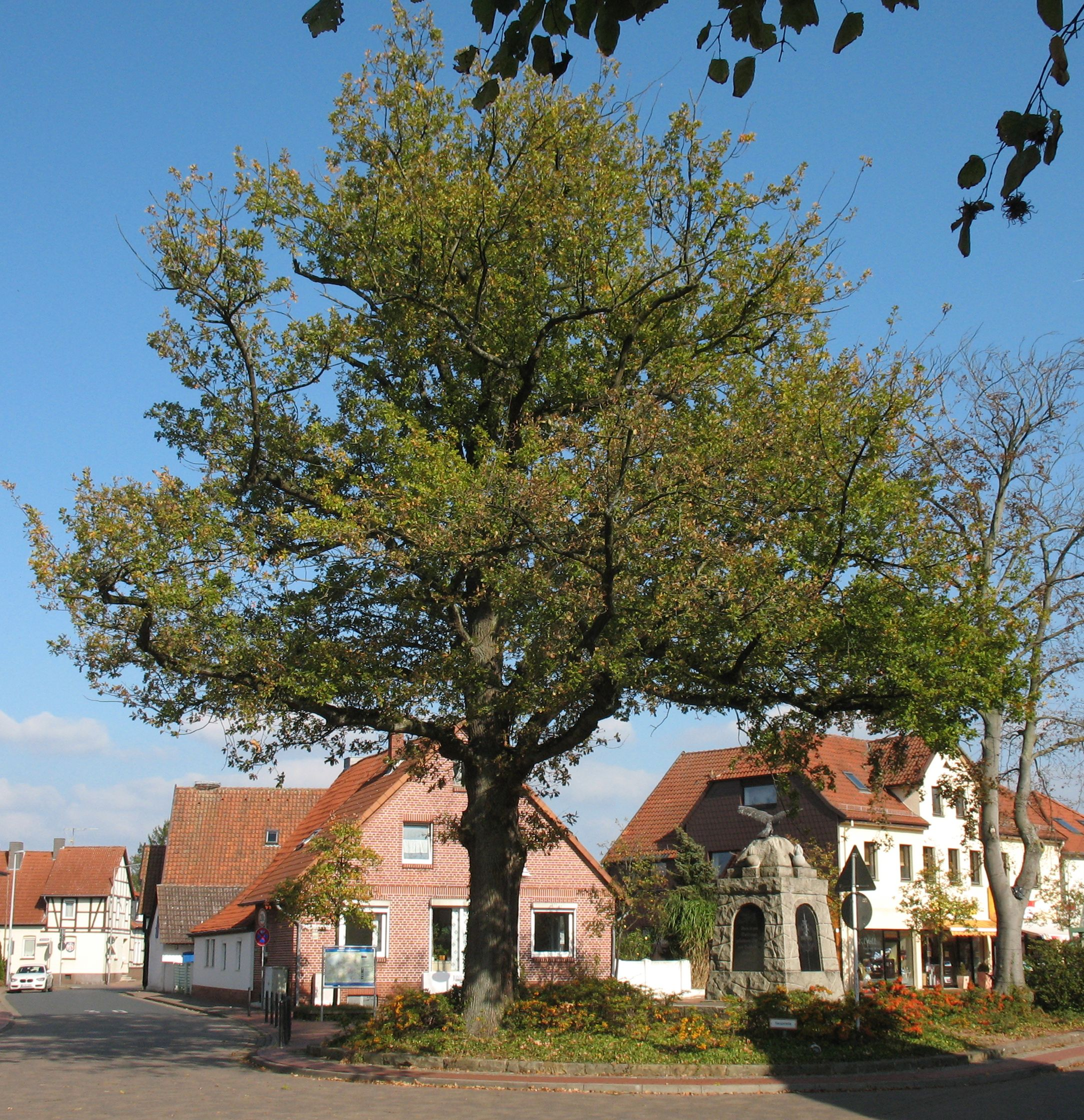
Oak of peace

=== Museums ===
Steinhude has several small museums:

- Fish and Weaving Museum
- Toy and Children's World Museum (in the Scheunen quarter)
- Insect Museum with butterfly farm
- Linen Weaving, which still produces table linen today.

=== Sport and leisure ===
Steinhude offers a wide range of leisure activities. There are interesting routes and destinations around the lake in the nature park for walkers and cyclists. There are also round trips with horse and coaches.

The lake is used extensively for sailing, and national and international regattas are held here. In winter there are competitions in ice sailing. Rowing, canoeing, pedalos and windsurfing are also popular.

The artificial island built in 1974–75 and known as the Steinhude swimming island (Badeinsel Steinhude) has an area of 35,000 square metres (8.6 acres) and has a flat sandy beach, special areas for sunbathing, relaxing and two sports fields. In summer there are also beach volleyball tournaments for amateurs and professionals, music concerts and concert series.

In the historic barn quarter (Scheunenviertel) there are many, changing exhibitions in the art barn. This is also the location of the information office for the Steinhuder Meer Nature Park.

In 1997 the Steinhuder Meer Golf Park was built, a golf course set into an idyllic landscape.

=== Regular events ===
High points in the calendar are Fischerkreidag on the weekend after Ascension, the shooting festival (Schützenfest) in July and the festive weekend in August with a half-hour firework display over the lake and an illuminated boat pageant, Lake Steinhude in Flames (Steinhuder Meer in Flammen). In December there is a Christmas Market.

=== Cuisine ===
Steinhude is known for its fish specialities, particularly the Steinhude smoked eel (Steinhuder Rauchaal).

== Economy and infrastructure ==
=== Transport ===
Bus links are to Neustadt am Rübenberge, Rehburg, Stadthagen and, most important, Wunstorf, where connections to local train services are available at Wunstorf station.

==== Boat transport ====
Several passenger boats ply Lake Steinhude carrying visitors; they are supplemented by typical sailing boats. The use of motor boats is only permitted by exception.
