= Steinhuder Meer Nature Park =

Nature park in Lower Saxony, Germany

Coordinates: 52°28′13″N 9°19′30″E

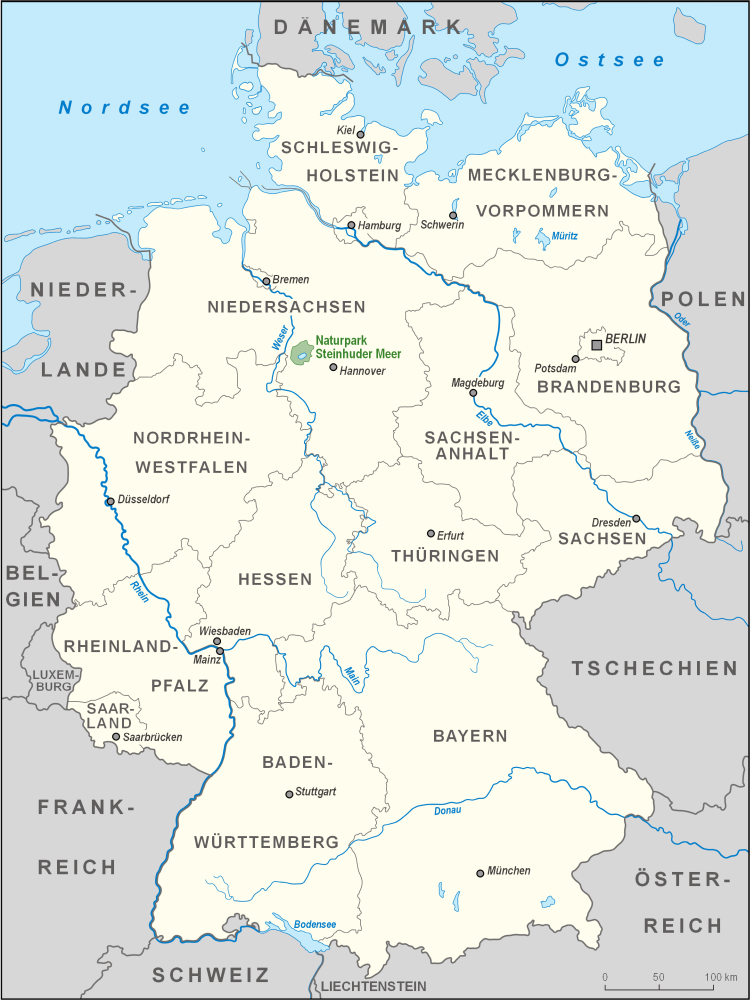
Location of the Steinhuder Meer Nature Park

The Steinhuder Meer Nature Park (German: Naturpark Steinhuder Meer), with northwest Germany's largest inland lake, the Steinhuder Meer, at its heart, covers an area of 310 square kilometres (120 sq mi) within the districts of Nienburg and Schaumburg and the region of Hanover. The sponsor of the nature park, founded in 1974, is Hanover Region.

== Location ==
The Steinhuder Meer Nature Park lies south of Nienburg/Weser, west of Neustadt am Rübenberge, northwest of Wunstorf, north of Hagenburg and Sachsenhagen and east of Rehburg-Loccum, parts of these parishes lying within the nature park itself. In the centre of the nature park is northwest Germany's biggest inland waterbody, Lake Steinhude (Steinhuder Meer). In the north of the nature park is the hillocky forest of Grinderwald, in the east is the bog of Totes Moor, its southwestern fringes are bordered by the Rehburg Hills and, in the northwest is the Schneerener Moor.

== Description ==
Over 10% of the nature park is under nature protection and over 65% under landscape protection. The Steinhuder Meer ("Lake Steinhude"), which is just under 30 square kilometres (12 sq mi) in area and only 1.5 metres (4 ft 11 in) deep, is a wetland of international importance and is a breeding and overwintering area and migration stop for many waders and water fowl. The wet meadows in the vicinity of the lake also play an important part here. In the bogs, some still intact and other recultivated, a large number of rare animal and plant species thrive.

The nature park sees up to 50,000 day visitors at weekends during the summer as a result of the variety of leisure pursuits available in this picturesque landscape. These pursuits include cycling, walking, swimming, sailing and surfing.

The villages of Steinhude and Mardorf benefit significantly more from this than Rehburg, Winzlar, Hagenburg or Großenheidorn. Villages bordering the lake have restrictions placed upon them for nature conservation reasons. The height of the water level, the desilting and removal of vegetation from the lake, building near the shores and the management of the stream of tourists have a significant potential for conflict. Just as conflicting are the restrictions on surfing, sailing and walking in order to support a bird reserve of international standing. The nature park has been commended several times for its providing a model solution to these conflicts of interest between nature conservation and tourism.

== See also ==
- List of nature parks in Germany
