= Nossa Senhora da Graça Fort =

Ancient fort in Alcáçova, Portugal

- Forte de N. Sra. da Graça
- Conde de Lippe Fort
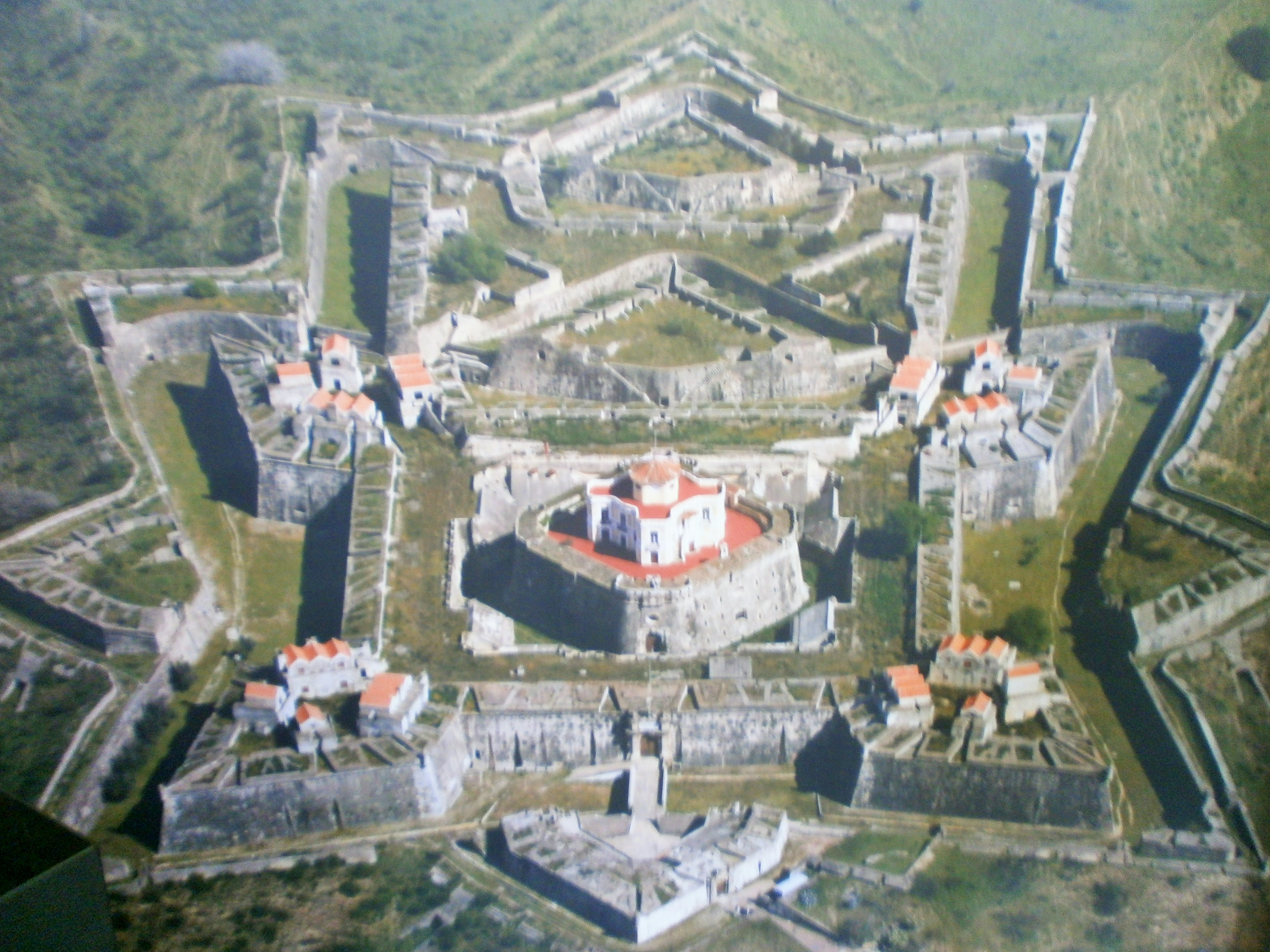
- Nossa Senhora da Graça Fort

- Location in Portugal
- 38°53′40″N 7°9′51″W
- Part of: Garrison Border Town of Elvas and its Fortifications

History
- Built: 1763–1792
- Built by: Joseph I of Portugal

Nossa Senhora da Graça Fort
UNESCO World Heritage Site
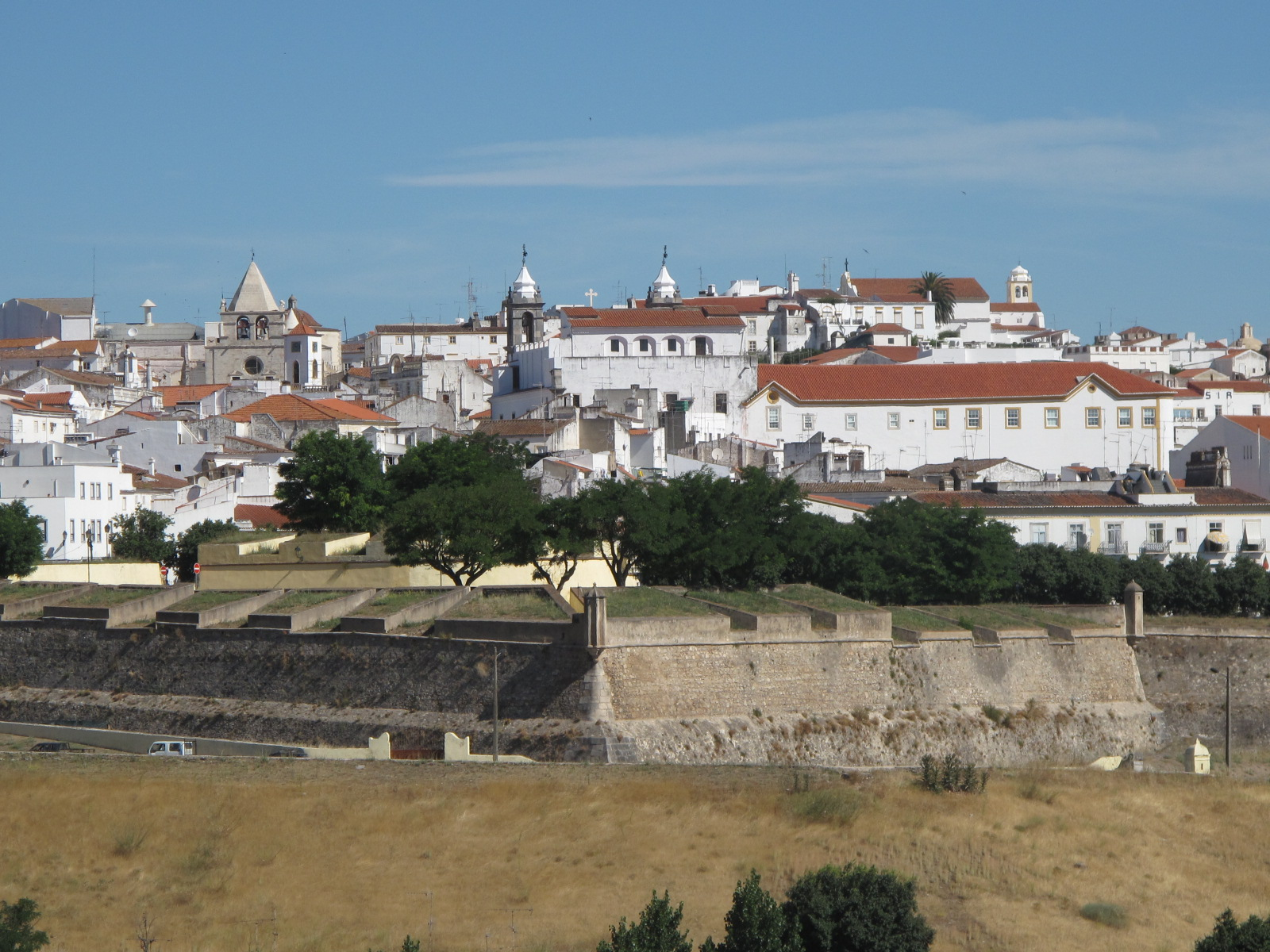
- Walls and fortifications of Elvas
- Interactive map of Nossa Senhora da Graça Fort
- Official name: Garrison Border Town of Elvas and its Fortifications
- Location: Elvas, Portalegre District, Alentejo, Portugal
- Criteria: Cultural: (iv)
- Reference: 1367bis
- Inscription: 2012 (36th Session)
- Extensions: 2013
- Area: 179.356 ha (443.20 acres)
- Buffer zone: 690 ha (1,700 acres)

Portuguese National Monument
- Type: Non-movable
- Criteria: National Monument
- Designated: 16 June 1910
- Reference no.: IPA.00003771
- Coordinates: 38°52′50.23″N 7°9′47.96″W

The Nossa Senhora da Graça Fort, officially Conde de Lippe Fort and known historically as La Lippe, is a fort in the village of Alcáçova, about 1 kilometre (0.62 mi) north of the town of Elvas in the Portalegre District of Portugal.

It stands in a dominant position on the Monte da Graça (Hill of Grace) and forms part of the Garrison Border Town of Elvas and its Fortifications, which on 30 June 2012 was classified as a UNESCO World Heritage Site.

In 2014, the fort became part of a new project under the aegis of the Portuguese Ministry of National Defence, with the support of Turismo de Portugal (Portuguese Tourism), which features historical itineraries based on Portuguese heroes.

== History ==
The strategic importance of the fort was demonstrated during the Portuguese Restoration War, when in 1658 Spanish troops occupied the site during the siege of the town of Elvas prior to the Battle of the Lines of Elvas on 14 January 1659.

A century later, during the Seven Years' War (1756-1763) King Joseph I of Portugal and the Marquis of Pombal called on Marshal Lippe to reorganise the Portuguese army and draw up plans for the modernisation of the stronghold. He drew a nearly identical copy of his home fortress Wilhelmstein, which he built in 1761.

The work began in 1763 and continued into the reign of Maria I of Portugal (r. 1777–1816), with the fort reopening in 1792 under the name of Conde de Lippe Fort after its designer.

The fort resisted Spanish troops during the 1801 War of the Oranges and a later attack in 1811 during the Peninsular War by the troops of Marshall Jean-de-Dieu Soult.

In September 1808, when the Spanish General Galluzzo heard of the signing of the Convention of Cintra, under which the defeated French were allowed to evacuate their troops from Portugal, he refused to acknowledge it. Instead he proceeded to carry out "a trifling bombardment of La Lippe from an immense distance, and the utmost damage sustained or likely to be sustained by that fortress, was the knocking away the cornices and chimneys of the governor's house, every other part being protected by bomb proofs of the finest masonry." The French commander of the La Lippes's garrison, Captain Girod de Novillars, held out against the Spanish until late November when the 1,200 French troops inside marched out following the arrival of the British.

Subsequently used as a military prison, by 2014 the site was in a near ruinous condition and awaited transfer to the Municipality of Elvas for restoration. The necessary work on the infrastructure was completed in September 2015 with the aim of turning the fort into a functional museum.

== Description ==
The fort is a 150 metres (490 ft) quadrangle with pentagonal bastions at the corners. Four ravelins cover the curtain wall, half of which form part of the monumental gate (Dragon Gate).

The central part of the square features a circular redoubt with two floors and a parapet with gun ports. The fort's circular tower has two vaulted floors: the first consisting of a decorated chapel and the second the Governor's House. Below the chapel, carved into the rock, there is a cistern.

Externally, the structure is completed by a hornwork and a wide dry moat.

A 19th century visitor described the fort thus:

There is a reservoir constantly supplied with water sufficient for the garrison of 2000 men for two years, and stores of corn and provisions for that time are also laid up. There is a mill within the walls for grinding corn, and an oven for baking sufficient bread, so that as there are no means for taking the fort but by treachery, surprise, or famine, the siege of La Lippe must be a work of patience, not to mention the loss; for as the besieged will be perfectly safe within their walls, so will the besiegers be completely exposed to the fire of the garrison : though surrounded on three sides by hills, they are all too low and too well commanded by the fort to admit of any annoyance from them. There is a curious circumstance in natural history connected with fort La Lippe: a well, which is of amazing depth, yields water which mixes readily with oil, and produces a thick fluid resembling milk, but the flavour of which is disagreeable.

Although many 18th and 19th century military commentators considered the fort impregnable, French General Dumouriez noted that because many of its batteries were set into the rock, they were vulnerable to cannonade fire while he considered the hornwork carried "the defences too great a distance".

== Gallery ==
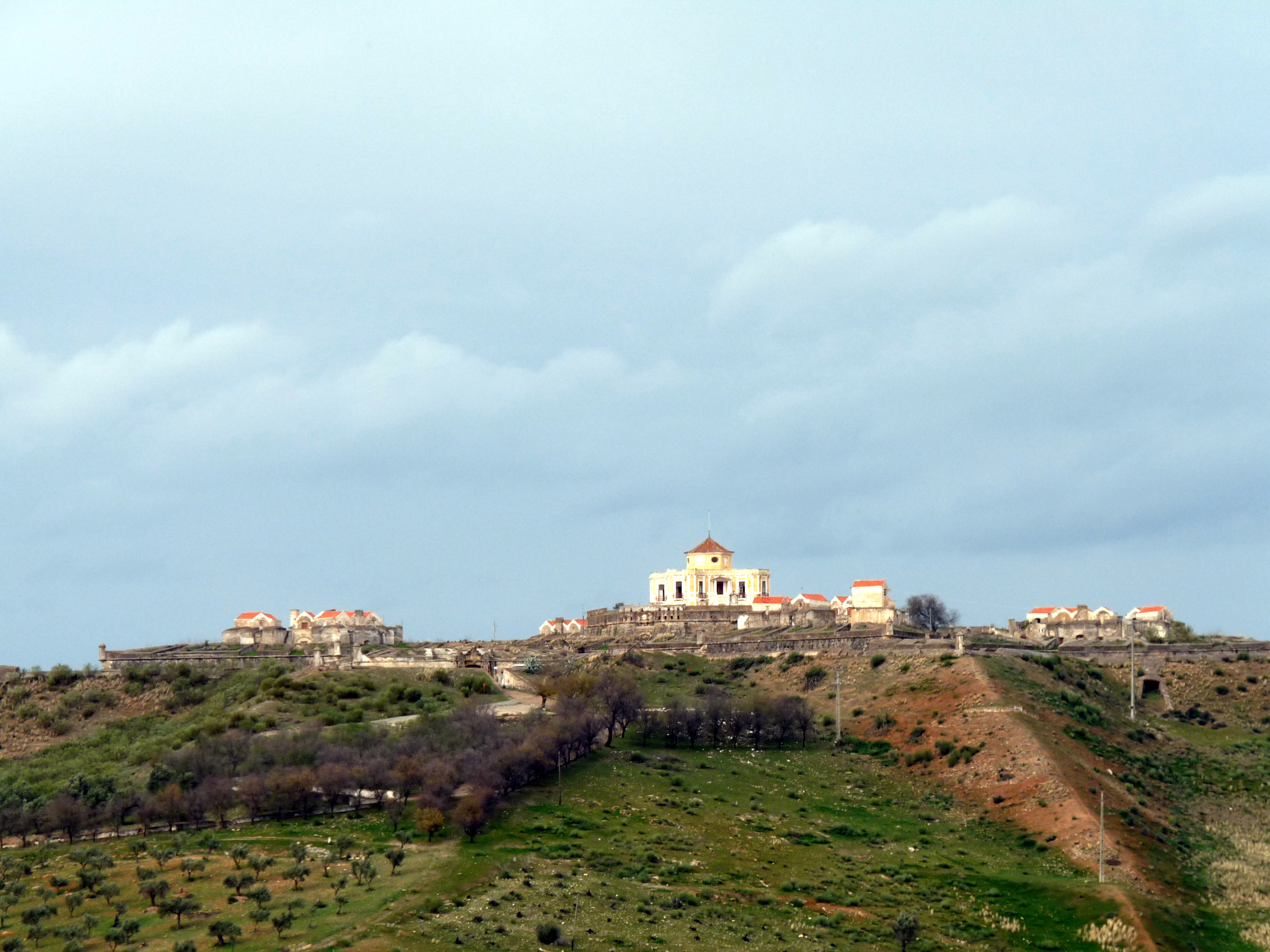
View from afar

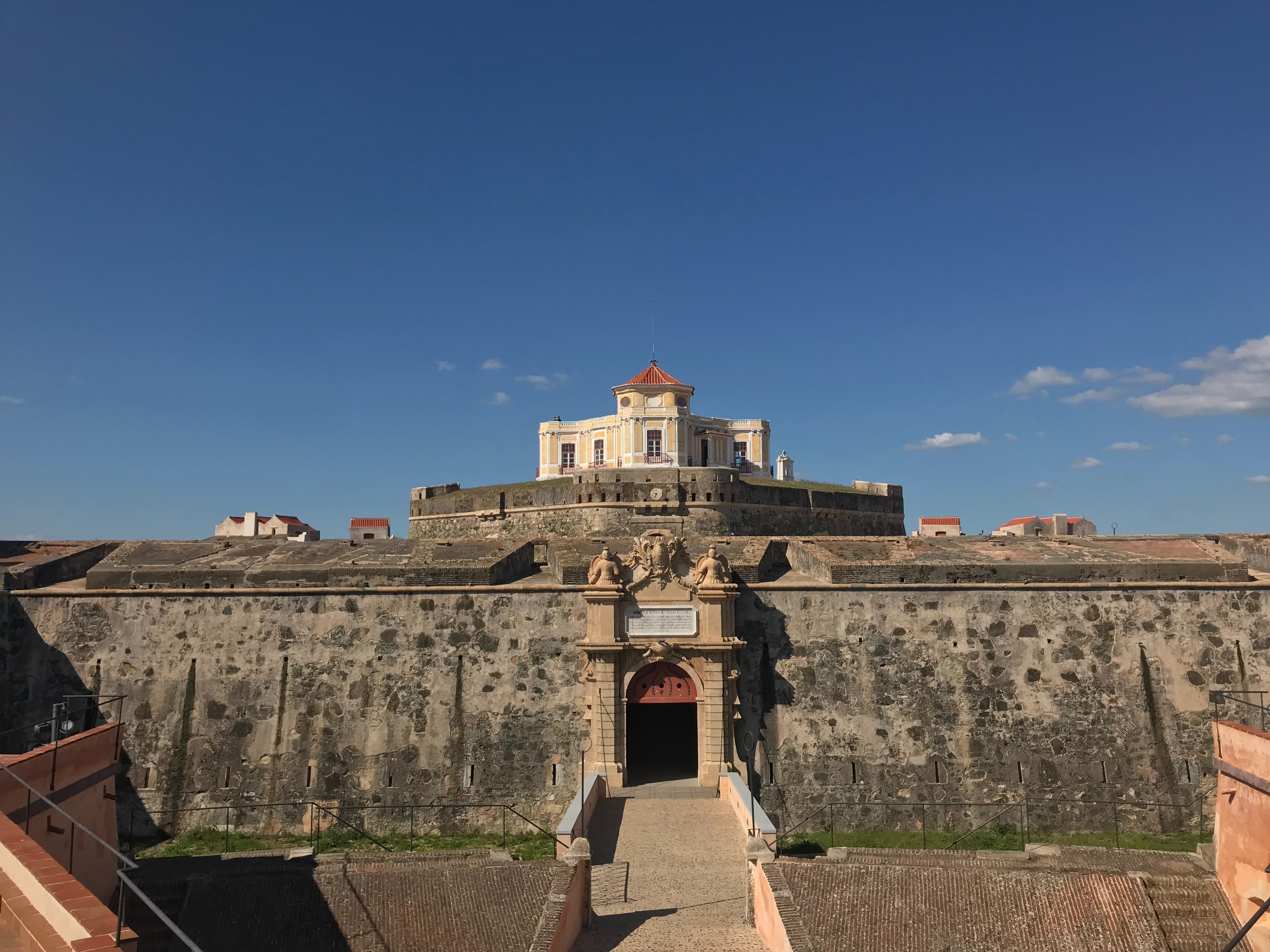
Front Gate

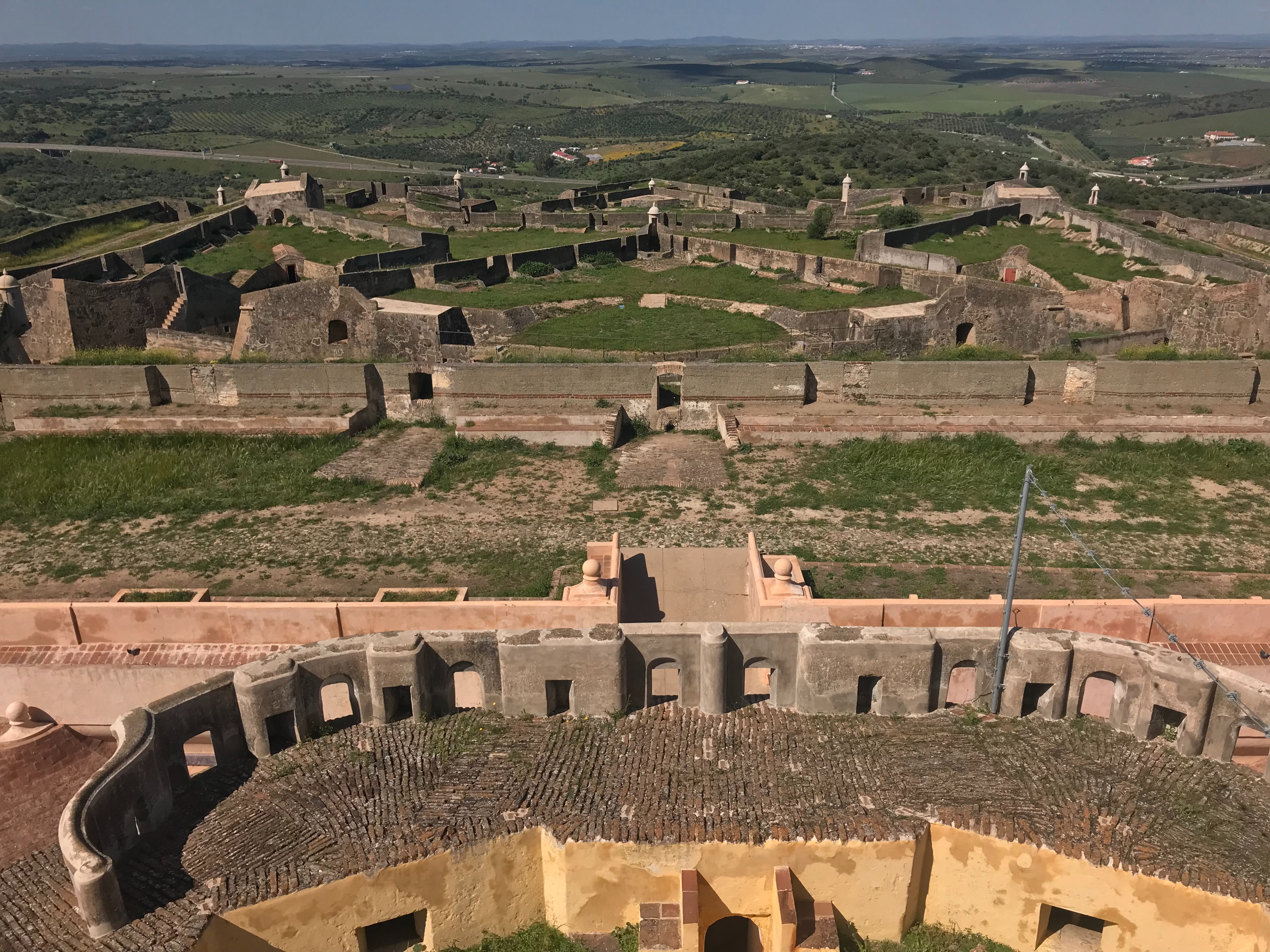
View from the Governors House

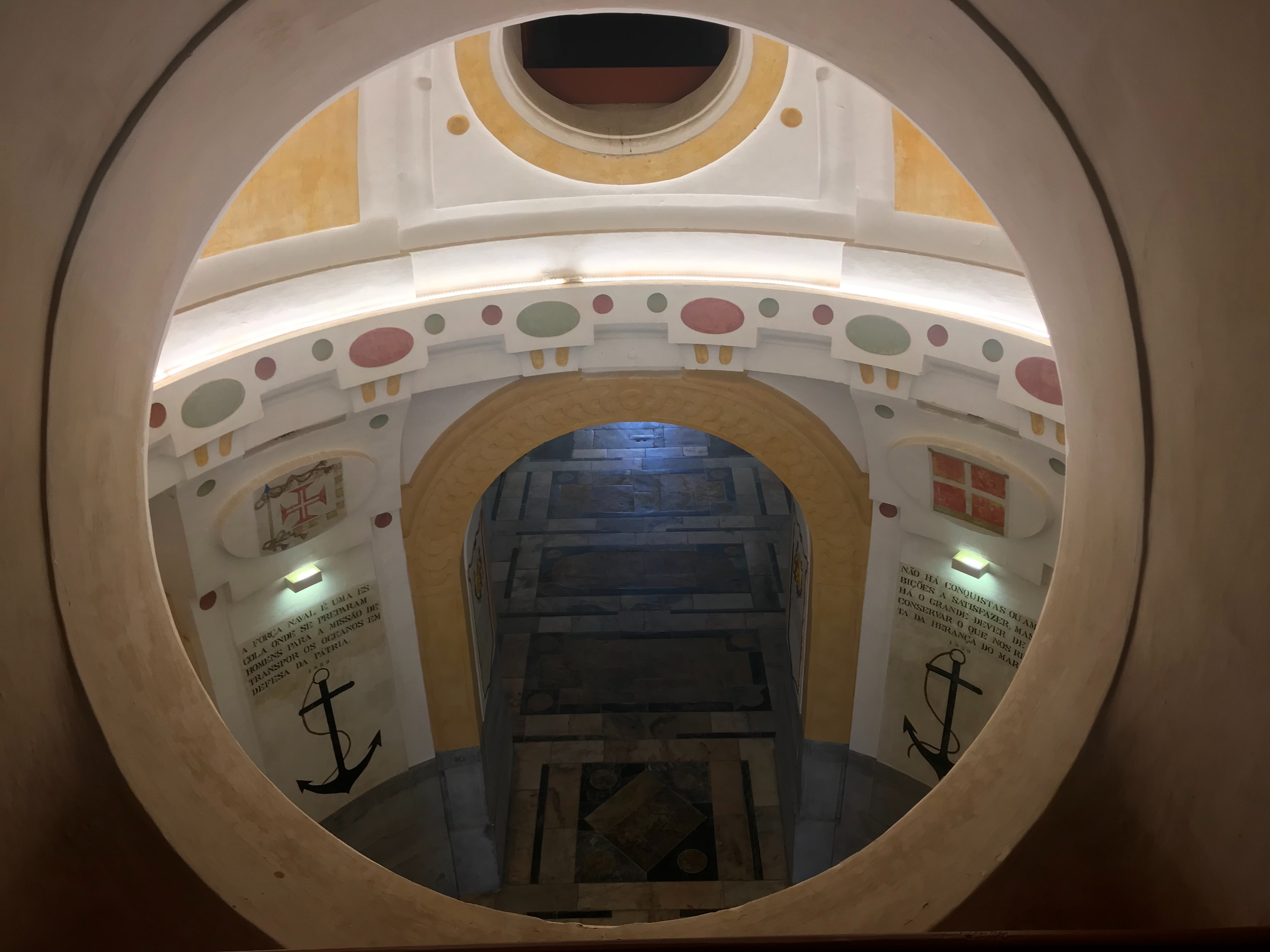
Looking into the Chapel from above

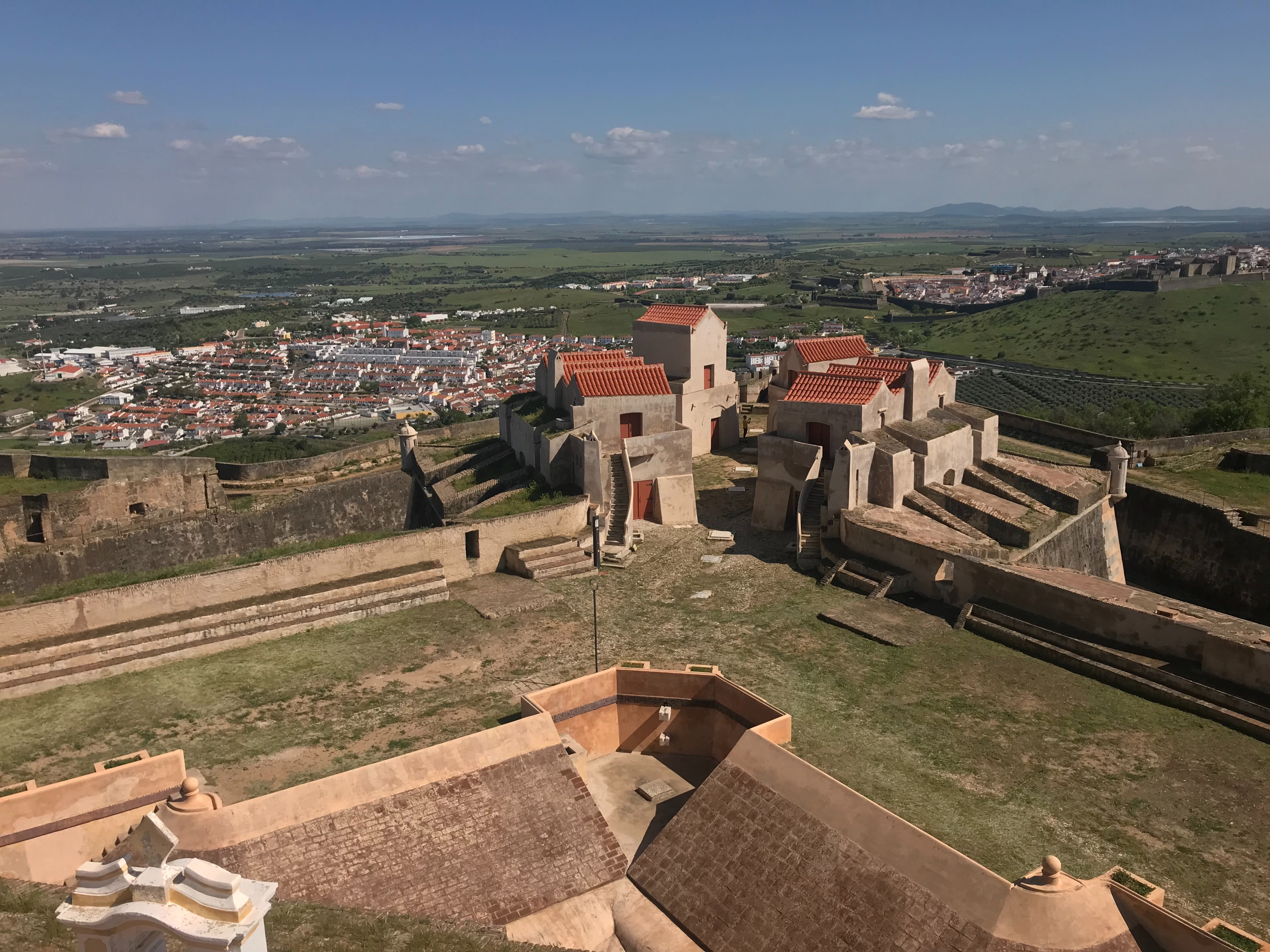
Living quarters with view of Elvas

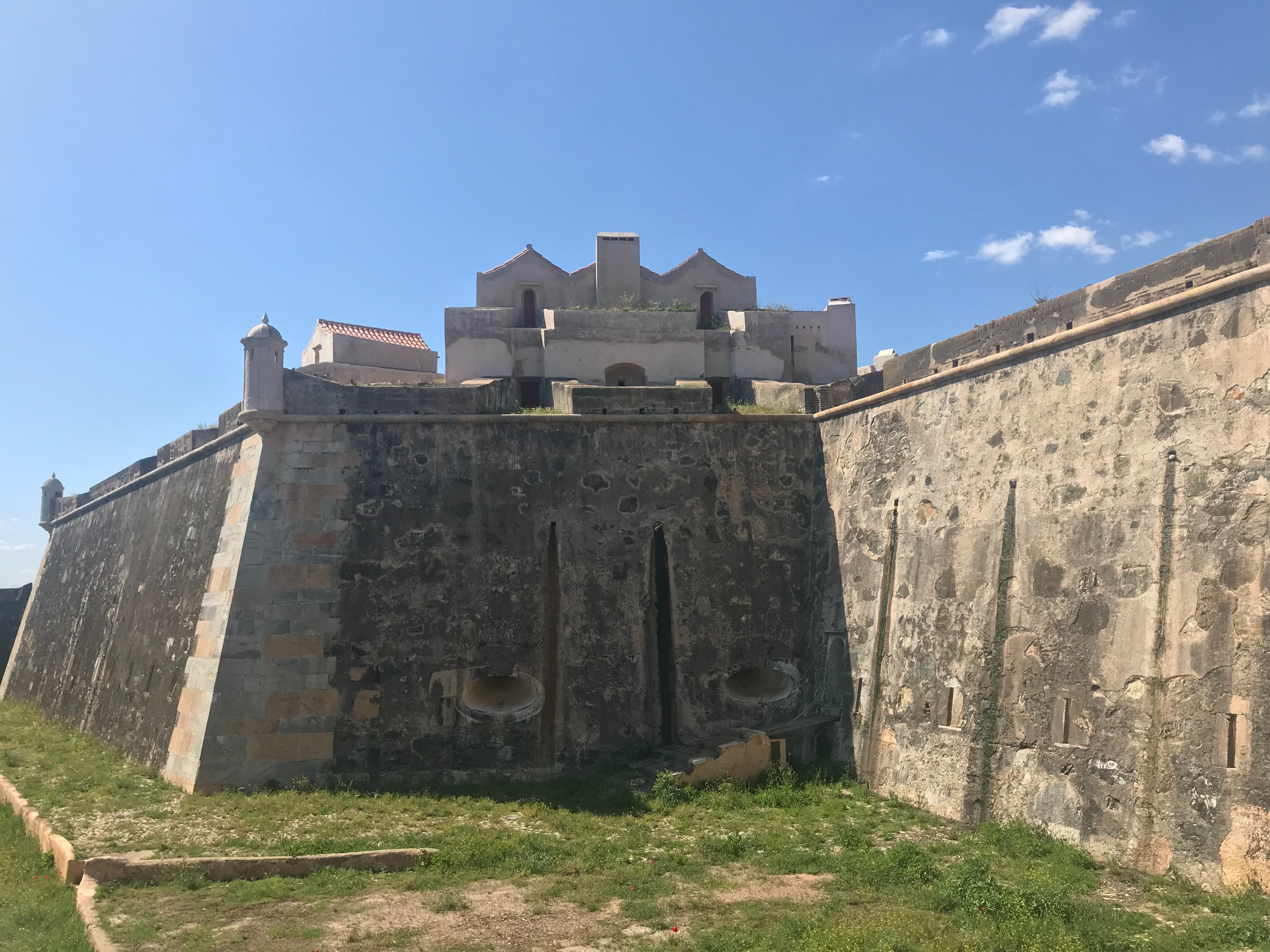
Fort wall

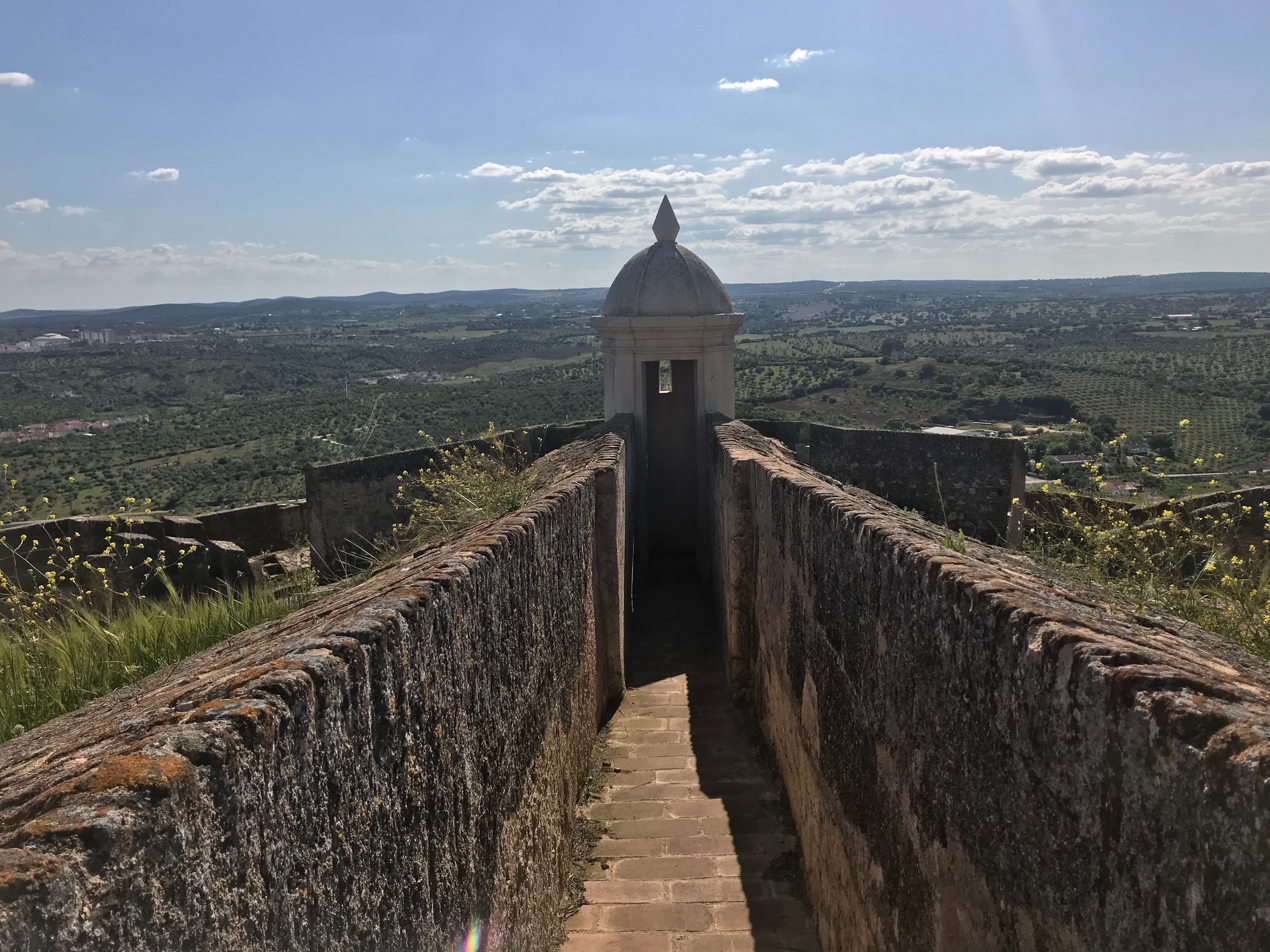
Watchtower

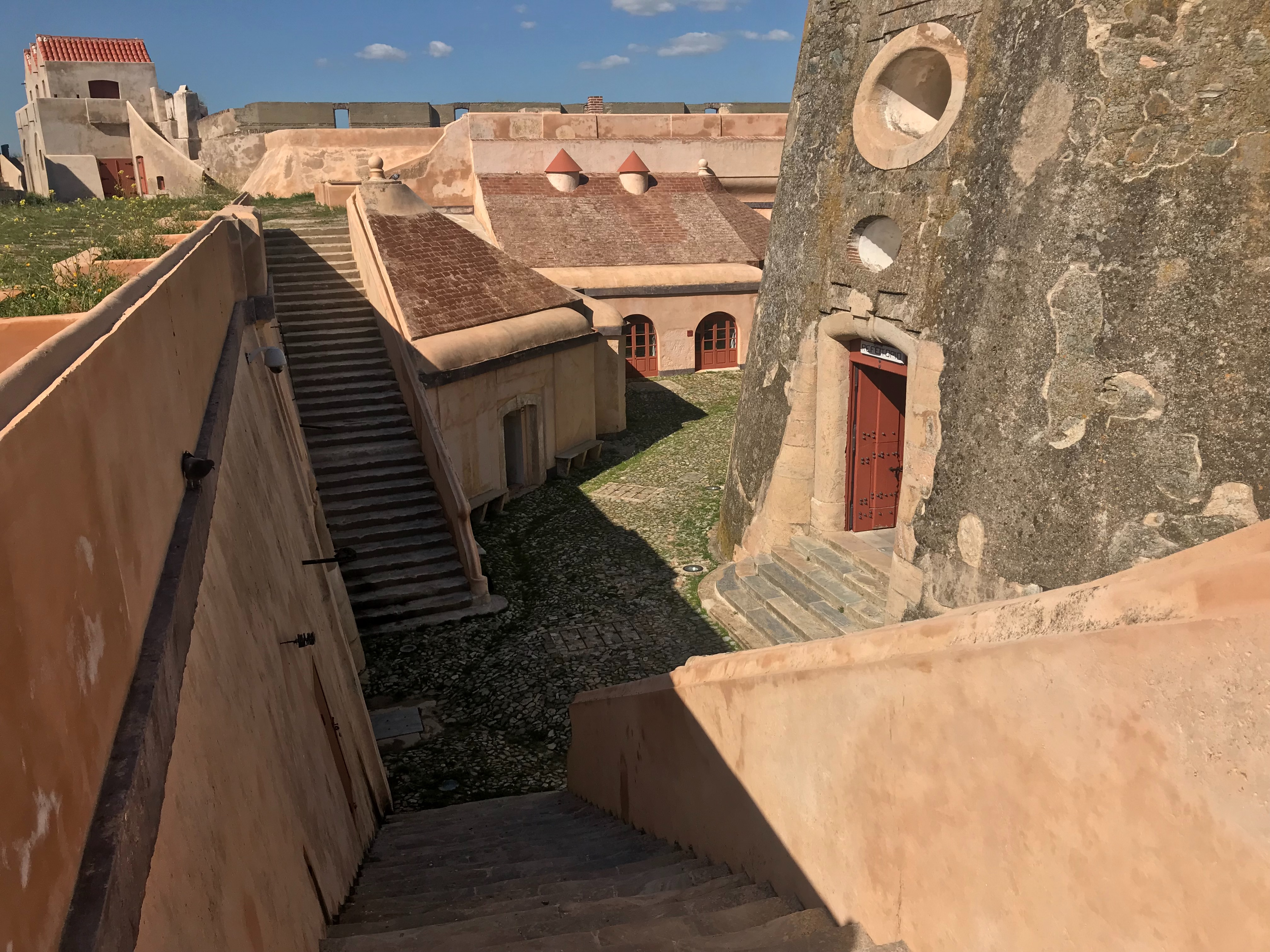
Within the fort walls

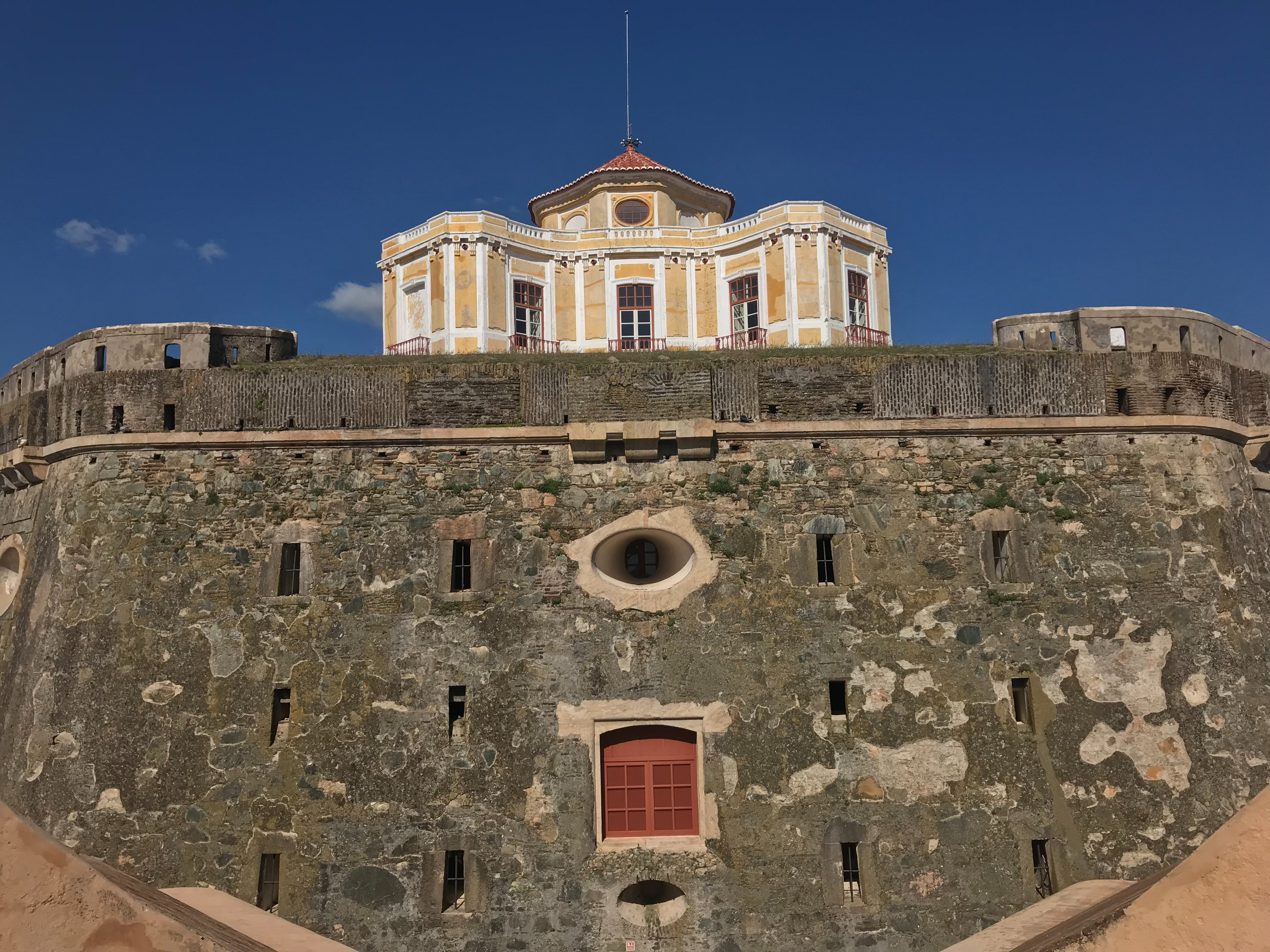
Governors House

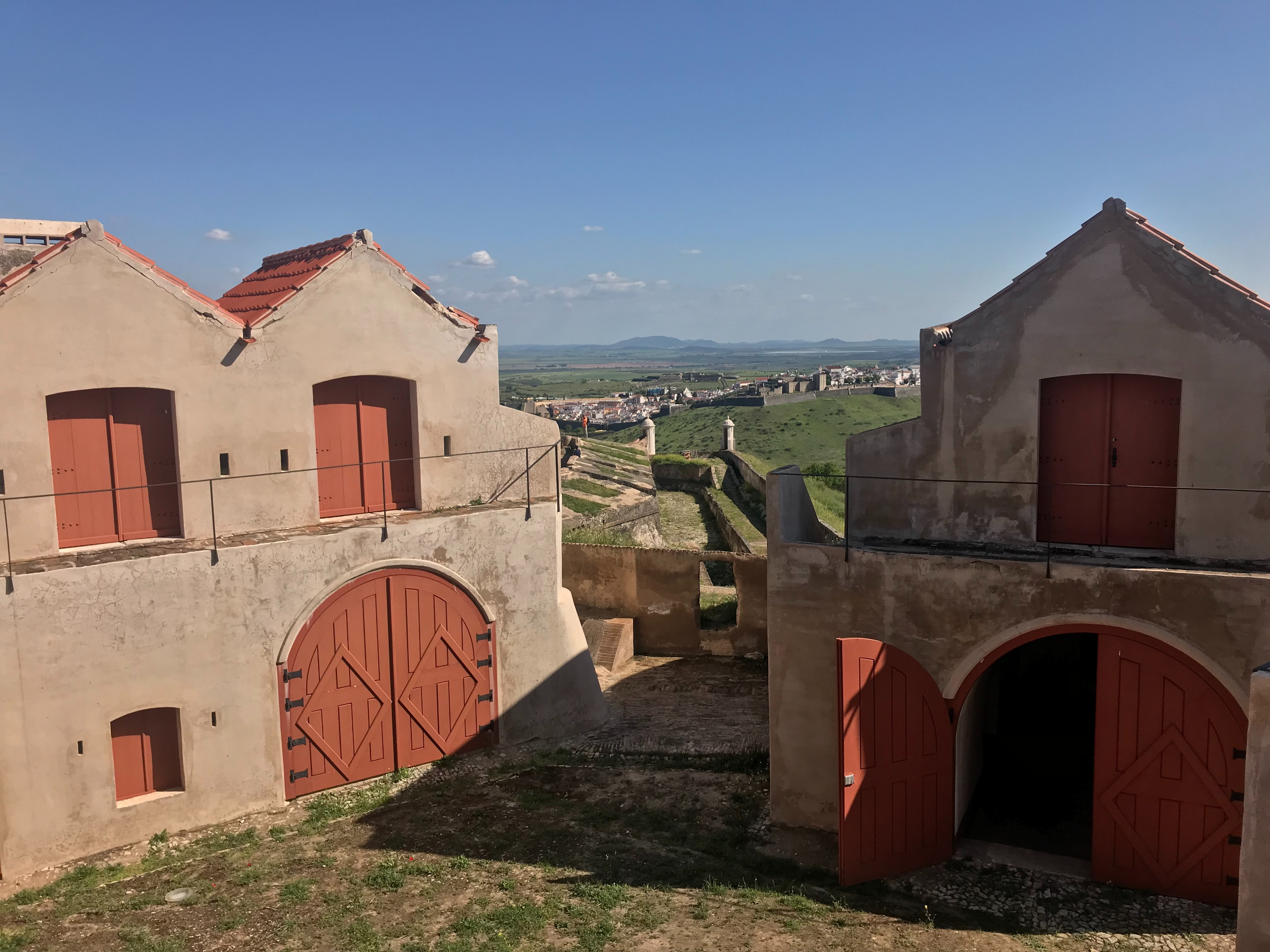
Living quarters

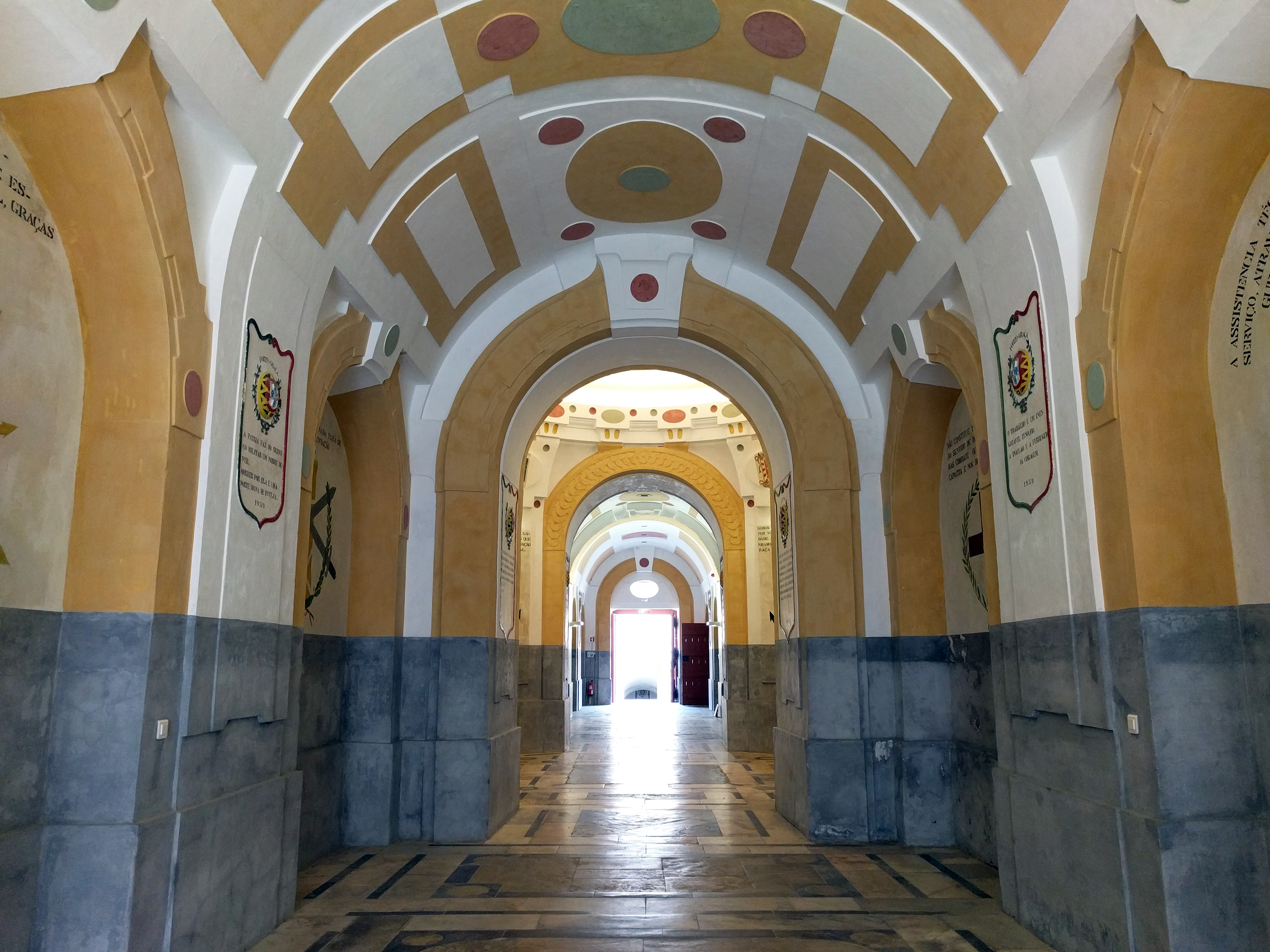
Interior of the Chapel
