= Die Finals =

Die Finals Logo

Die Finals (translated The Finals) is a multi-sport event that combines the German national championships from a range of different sports. It is an annual event first held in 2019, taking place over several days and in close proximity.

The competition aims to popularize smaller sports by combining well-established disciplines with emerging ones in a single event. The competition therefore covers a changing variety of Olympic, Paralympic, and non-Olympic sports, with all disciplines eligible for participation as long as they ensure a high level of competition among the country's best athletes and are recognized as official German championships.

== Chronology ==
No.	Year	Date	Event Name	Places	Disciplines	Championship Titles	Athletes	Visitors
1	2019	30 July – 4 Aug.	Berlin 2019	Berlin	10	202	3,300	178,000
	2020	cancelled	Rhein-Ruhr 2020	Düsseldorf, Duisburg, Neuss, Aachen, Oberhausen, Braunschweig	16	–	–	–
2	2021	3 – 6 June	Berlin/Rhein-Ruhr 2021	Berlin, Dortmund, Duisburg, Bochum, Balve, Braunschweig	18	140	2,300	
3	2022	23 – 26 June	Berlin 2022	Berlin	14	190	2,200	220,000
4	2023	6 – 9 July	Rhein-Ruhr 2023	Düsseldorf, Duisburg, Kassel, Berlin	18	159		210,000
5	2025	31 July – 3 Aug.	Dresden 2025	Dresden	20	133	3,500	250,000
6	2026	23 – 26 July	Hanover 2026	Hanover, Steinhuder Meer	24	143		480,000
7	2027	29 July – 1 Aug.	Stuttgart 2027	Stuttgart	16 (planned)			
