= Steinhuder Hecht =

German submarine built in 1772

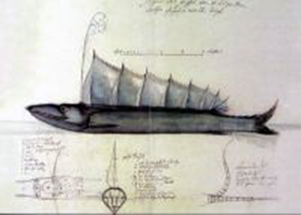
Contemporary sketch

The Steinhude pike (German: Steinhuder Hecht) from 1772 is said to be the first submarine built in Germany.

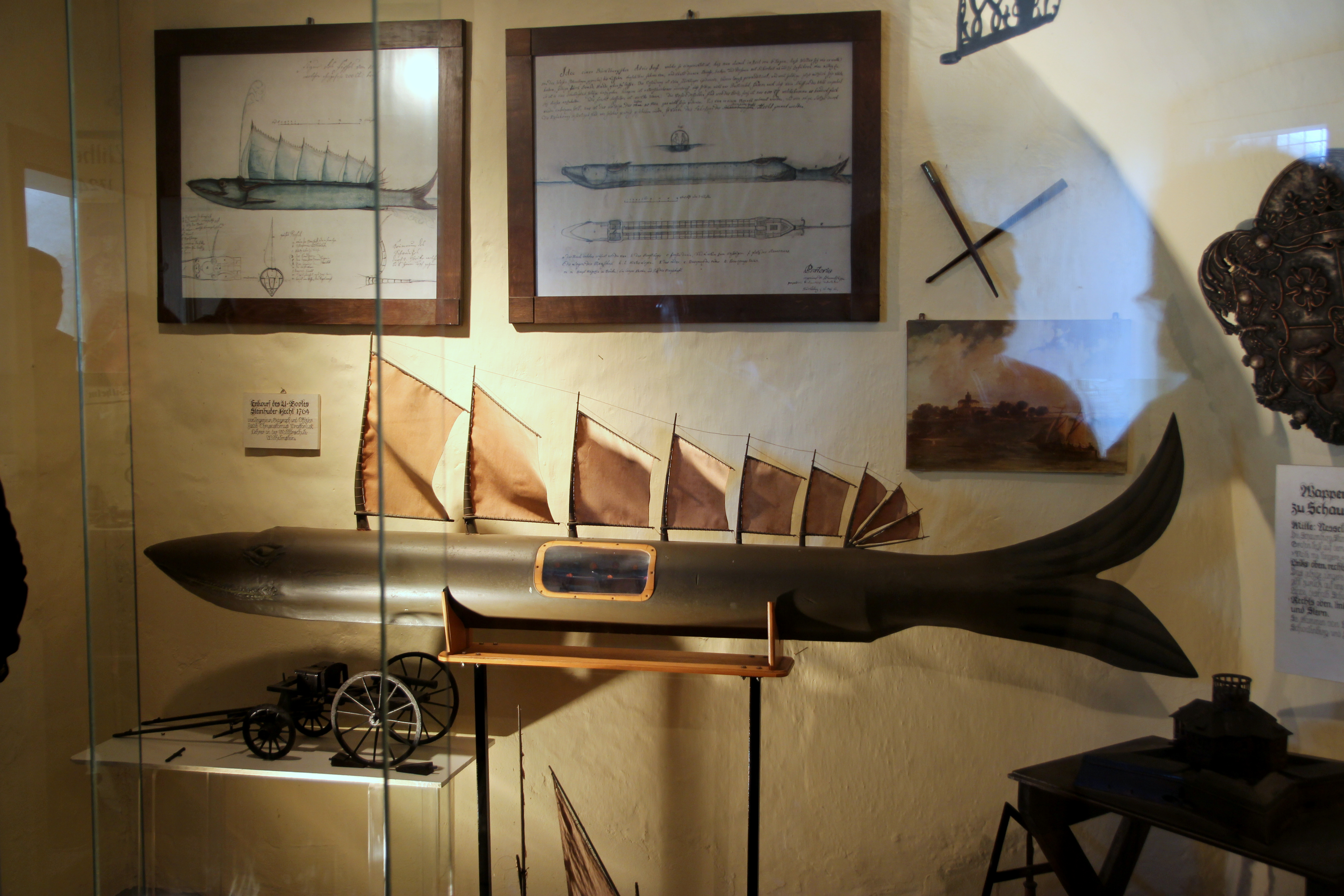
Model in the Wilhelmstein Fortress, a military museum

The engineer and officer Jakob Chrysostomus Praetorius drafted a construction made of oak wood, in the shape of a fish with sails and mobile rear. Allegedly, the plan was presented to William, Count of Schaumburg-Lippe in 1762. After an initial rejection it was built in 1772 at the island fortress Wilhelmstein in a reduced version. It is said to have dived in the Steinhuder Meer, a large lake, for 12 minutes. However, as the lake has a maximum depth of 2.9 metres (9 ft 6 in) this claim is dubious.

While the range of the Steinhude pike must have been limited, Count Wilhelm, according to a local legend, wanted to sail to Portugal with it. However, its military purpose was to connect the fortification with the allies of Schaumburg-Lippe, especially Britain, Braunschweig-Lüneburg and Prussia in the event of a siege.

Today a model and construction plans are exhibited in the military museum Wilhelmstein. The Wilhelmstein was the planned base for the Steinhude pike.

== General references ==
- Wesk, Timm (2002). Hippopotame and Schaumburger or Steinhuder Hecht - An Amphibious Craft and a Submarine from the 18th century. The Mariner's Mirror: the Journal of the Society for Nautical Research. Vol. 88. pp. 271–284. doi:10.1080/00253359.2002.10656847. ISSN 0025-3359. S2CID 162239950.
