= Steinhuder Meer =

Lake in Lower Saxony, Germany

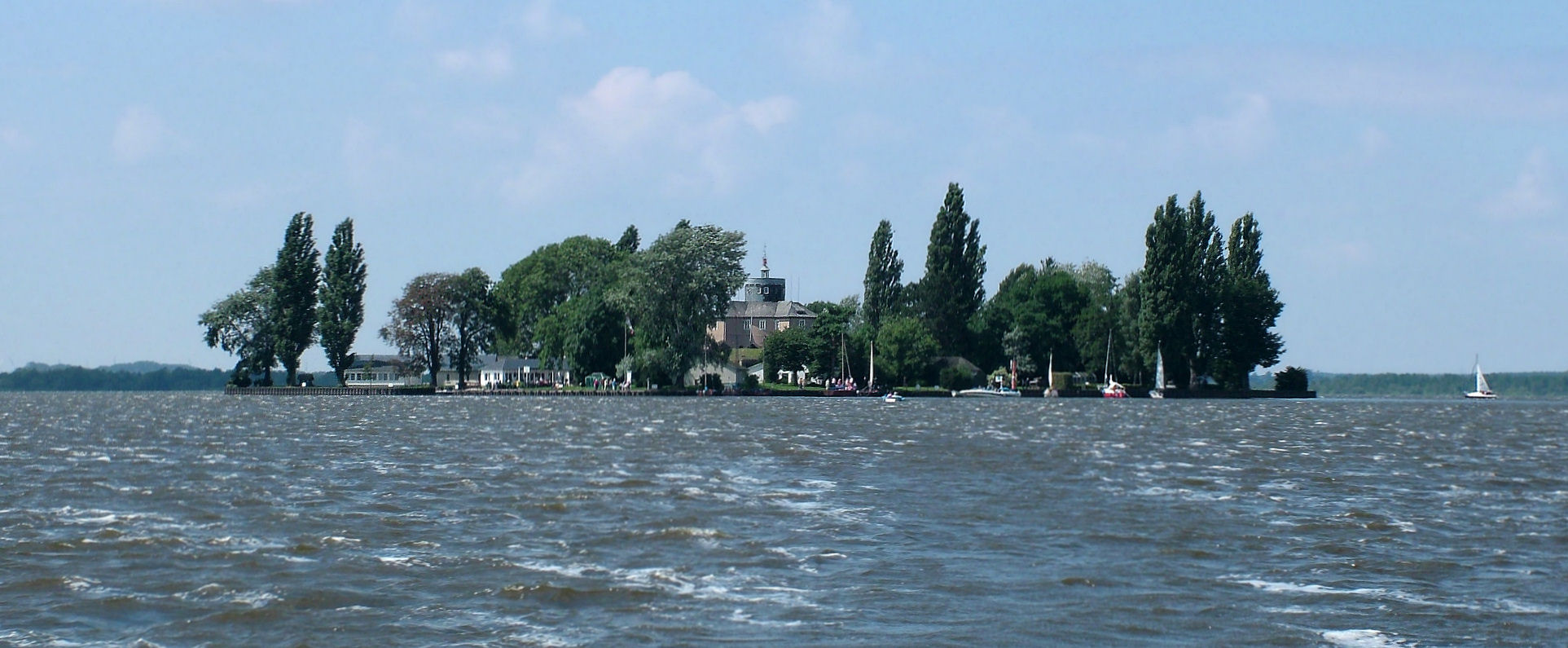
- Wilhelmstein fortress in the lake

- Location within Lower Saxony
- Location: 30 km NW of Hanover, Lower Saxony
- Coordinates: 52°28′N 9°20′E
- Primary inflows: Groundwater, precipitation
- Primary outflows: Steinhuder Meerbach (towards Weser)
- Basin countries: Germany
- Max. length: 8 km (5 mi)
- Max. width: 4.5 km (2.8 mi)
- Surface area: 29.12 km^{2} (11.24 sq mi)
- Average depth: 1.35 m (4 ft 5 in)
- Max. depth: 3 m (9.8 ft)
- Water volume: 0.088 km^{3} (0.021 cu mi)
- Surface elevation: 38 m (125 ft)
- Islands: 2 (Wilhelmstein and Badeinsel)
- Settlements: Steinhude, Hagenburg, Mardorf

Ramsar Wetland
- Designated: 26 February 1976
- Reference no.: 87

Lake Steinhude, German: Steinhuder Meer, German pronunciation, is a lake in Lower Saxony, Germany located 30 kilometres (19 mi) northwest of Hanover. Named after the nearby village of Steinhude, it has an area of about 30 square kilometres (12 sq mi), making it the largest lake of northwestern Germany. At the same time, Lake Steinhude is very shallow, with an average depth of only 1.35 metres (4.4 ft) and a maximum depth of less than 3 metres (9.8 ft). It lies within a region known as the Hanoverian Moor Geest.

== Etymology ==
The name Steinhude is interpreted by the onomast Jürgen Udolph as a compound of the word "Stein" (stone) and something like “stacking place by the water.” The Steinhuder Meer was originally known simply as “Meer” (sea) or “Meer bei Wunstorf” (Latin: "Mare" or "Mari prope Wunnestorp"). It first appeared on a map in the 16th century as “Steinhüer Meer.” In 1770, the name “Steinuder Meer” was used on a map by Jakob Chrysostomus Praetorius.

== Geology ==
It is part of the glacial landscape formed after the recession of the glaciers of the latest Ice Age, the Weichselian glaciation. There are two theories regarding how the lake of Steinhude was formed. One of them says that glaciers gouged out the hole and meltwater filled it. The other theory states that an ice storm formed the hole and as the groundwater rose, the lake was created. In its middle there is a small artificial island carrying an 18th-century fortification, the Wilhelmstein. Today the lake is the heart of a nature reserve, the Steinhuder Meer Nature Park, and is also used as a recreational area.

== Islands ==
The lake has two islands, both of them artificial:

- Wilhelmstein (1.25 hectares or 3.1 acres) off Hagenburg was built between 1761 and 1765. It was turned into a military fortress between 1765 and 1767 by William, Count of Schaumburg-Lippe. Afterwards it briefly served as military school (one of its graduates was Gerhard von Scharnhorst who later became Chief of the Prussian General Staff). From 1777 until 1867 the island was used as state prison of the Principality of Schaumburg-Lippe.
- Badeinsel Steinhude (3.5 hectares or 8.6 acres) was built in 1974–75 using sand retrieved from the lake. It has a sandy beach which is popular during summer. Access to the island is via an 80-metre (260 ft) pedestrian bridge from Steinhude.

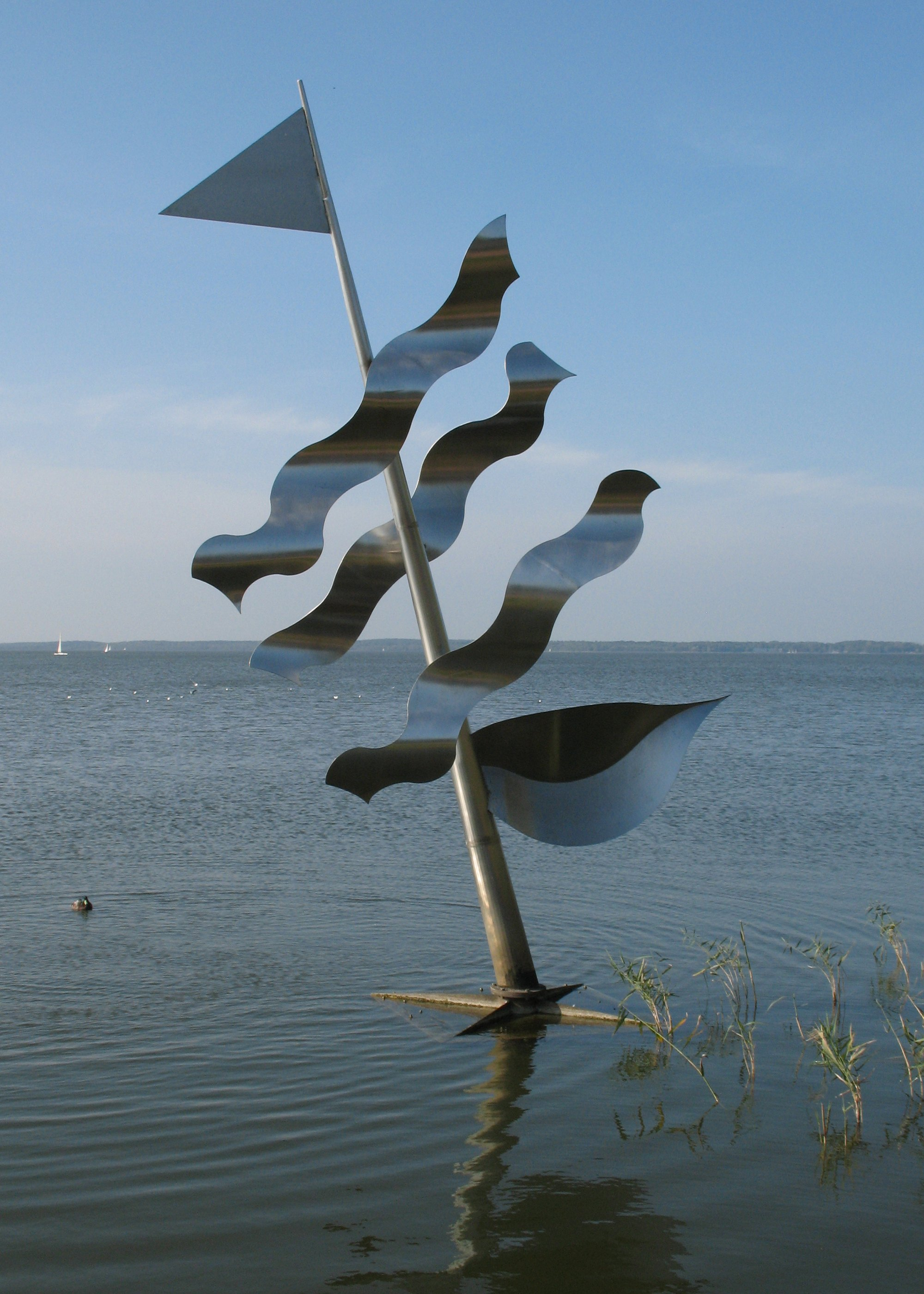
Sculpture in Steinhude

== Tourism ==
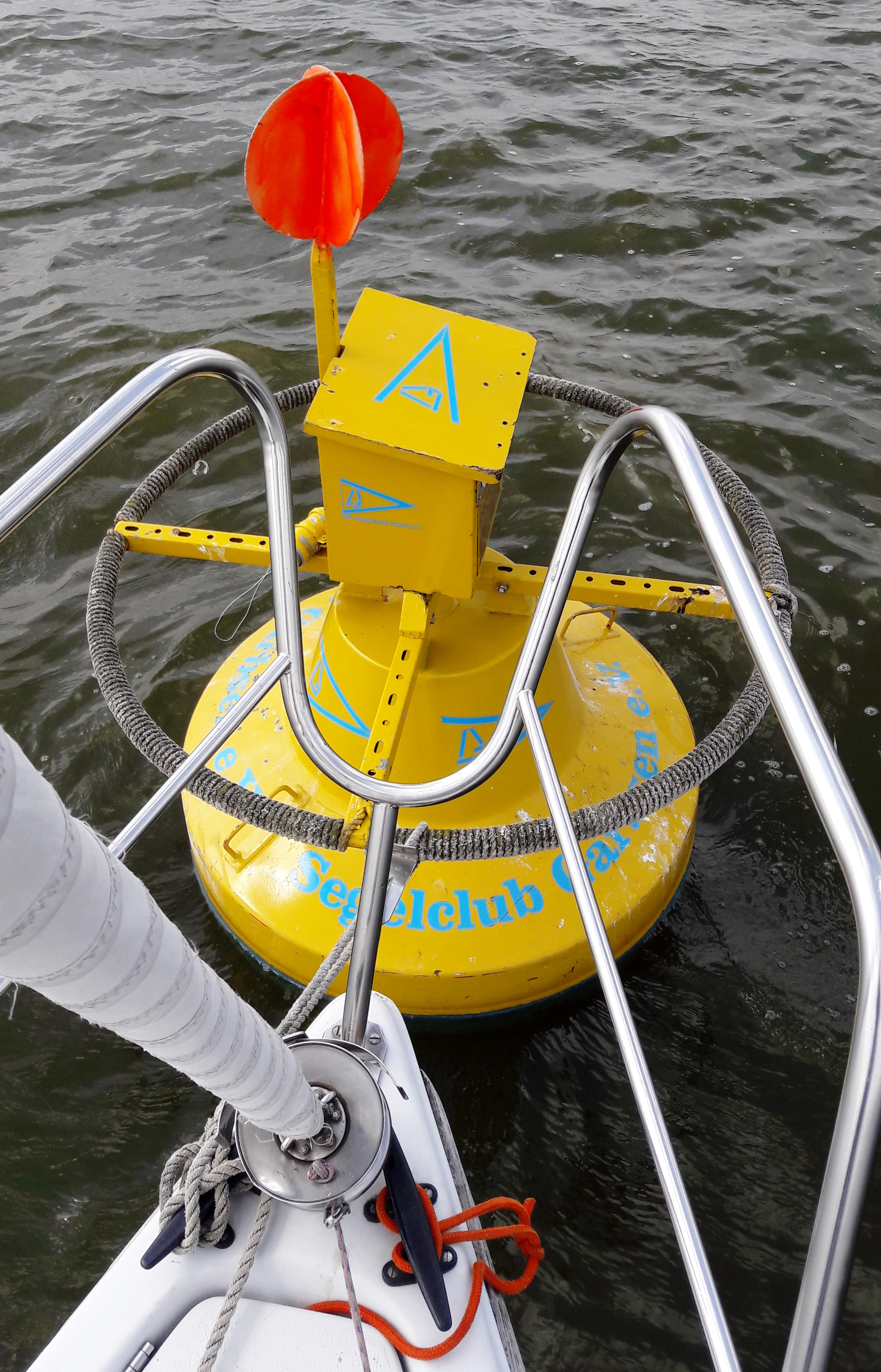
The post box on a buoy in the Steinhuder Meer

The lake is a popular destination for locals and for vacationists. Up to three ships offer cruises; they are supplemented by smaller boats running on schedule across the lake. A bike path approximately 35 kilometres (22 mi) long encircles the lake, crossing various landscapes.

Since 1964, the lake has hosted a post box on a buoy.
