= Wilhelmstein =

Artificial island in Lake Steinhude, Germany

Coordinates: 52°27′37″N 9°18′28″E

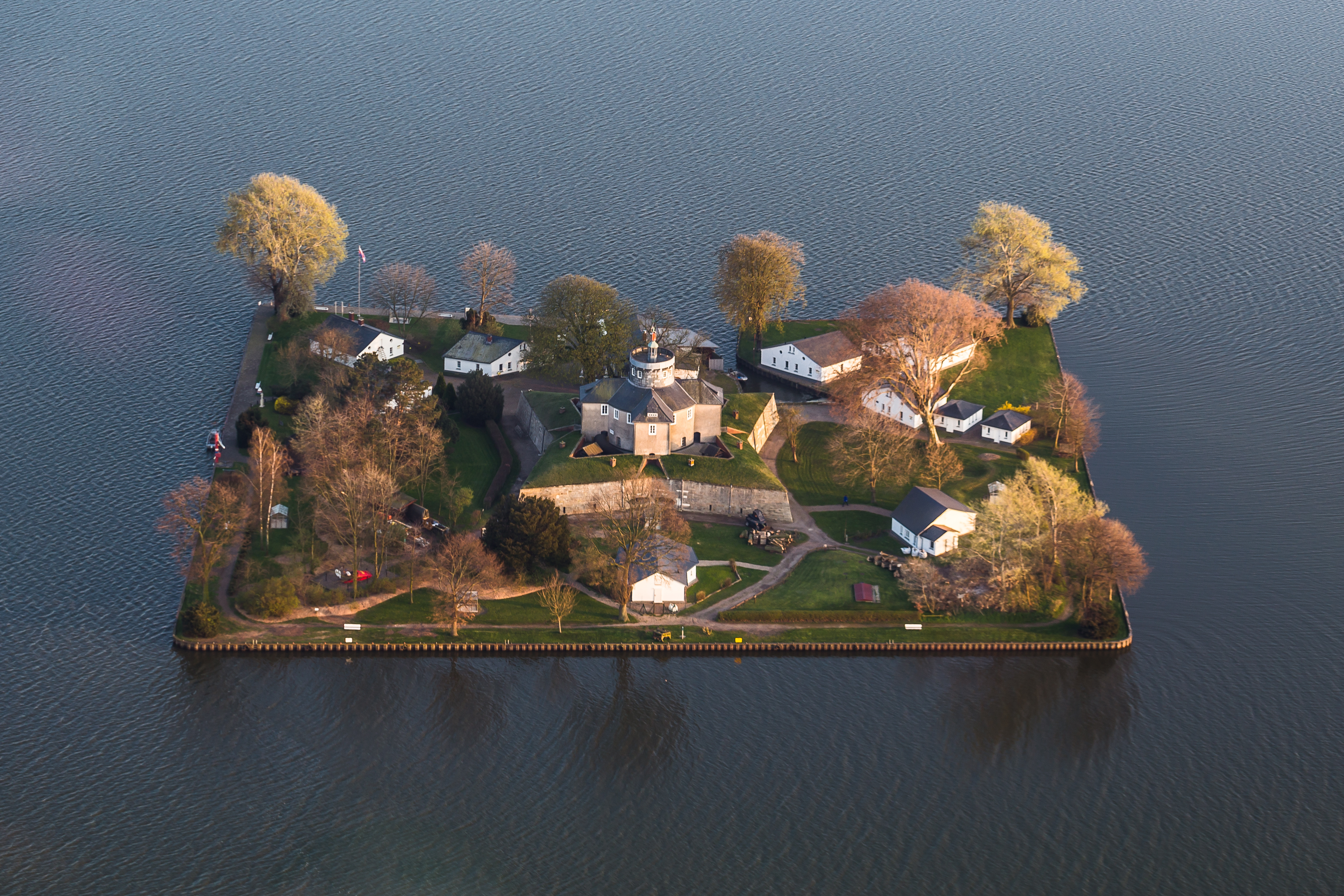
Aerial picture, view to the east

Wilhelmstein is an artificial island with an area of 12,500 square metres (3.1 acres) in lake Steinhuder Meer, located in the Hanover Region, Northern Germany. The island was created in the 18th century as a fortification by Count William of Schaumburg-Lippe, ruler of this small German state. The man-made isle (Count Wilhelm of Schaumburg-Lippe had the island built between 1761 and 1765 for his military fortress) hosts the Wilhelmsen fortress (German: Festung Wilhelmstein). Today the island, close to Hagenburg, is a popular destination for tourists. It can be reached by so-called 'emigrants boats' from Steinhude and Mardorf.

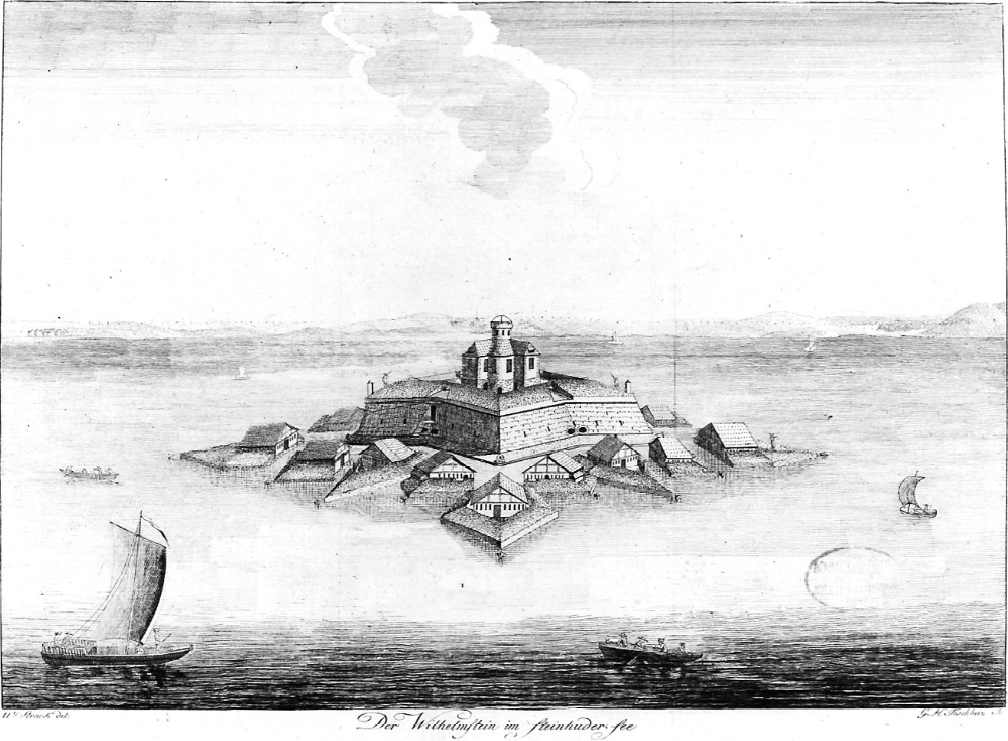
Chalcography from 1787

== See also ==
- In 1772 the island was the base of the first German submarine, the Steinhude Pike.
