= Hagenburg =

- Municipality
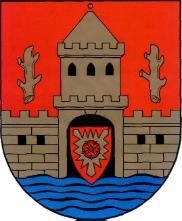
- Coat of arms

- Location of Hagenburg within Schaumburg district
- Interactive map of Hagenburg
- Location within Germany Location within Lower Saxony
- Coordinates: 52°26′N 9°19′E
- Country: Germany
- State: Lower Saxony
- District: Schaumburg
- Municipal assoc.: Sachsenhagen
- Subdivisions: 2

Government
  - Mayor: Karl-Wilhelm Möller (CDU)

Area
  - Total: 16.23 km^{2} (6.27 sq mi)
- Elevation: 40 m (130 ft)

Population (2025-12-31)
  - Total: 4,413
  - Density: 271.9/km^{2} (704.2/sq mi)
- Time zone: UTC+01:00 (CET)
  - Summer (DST): UTC+02:00 (CEST)
- Postal codes: 31558
- Dialling codes: 05033
- Vehicle registration: SHG
- Website: www.hagenburg.de

Hagenburg is a municipality in the district of Schaumburg, in Lower Saxony, Germany.
