= Secretary-General of the European Economic and Social Committee =

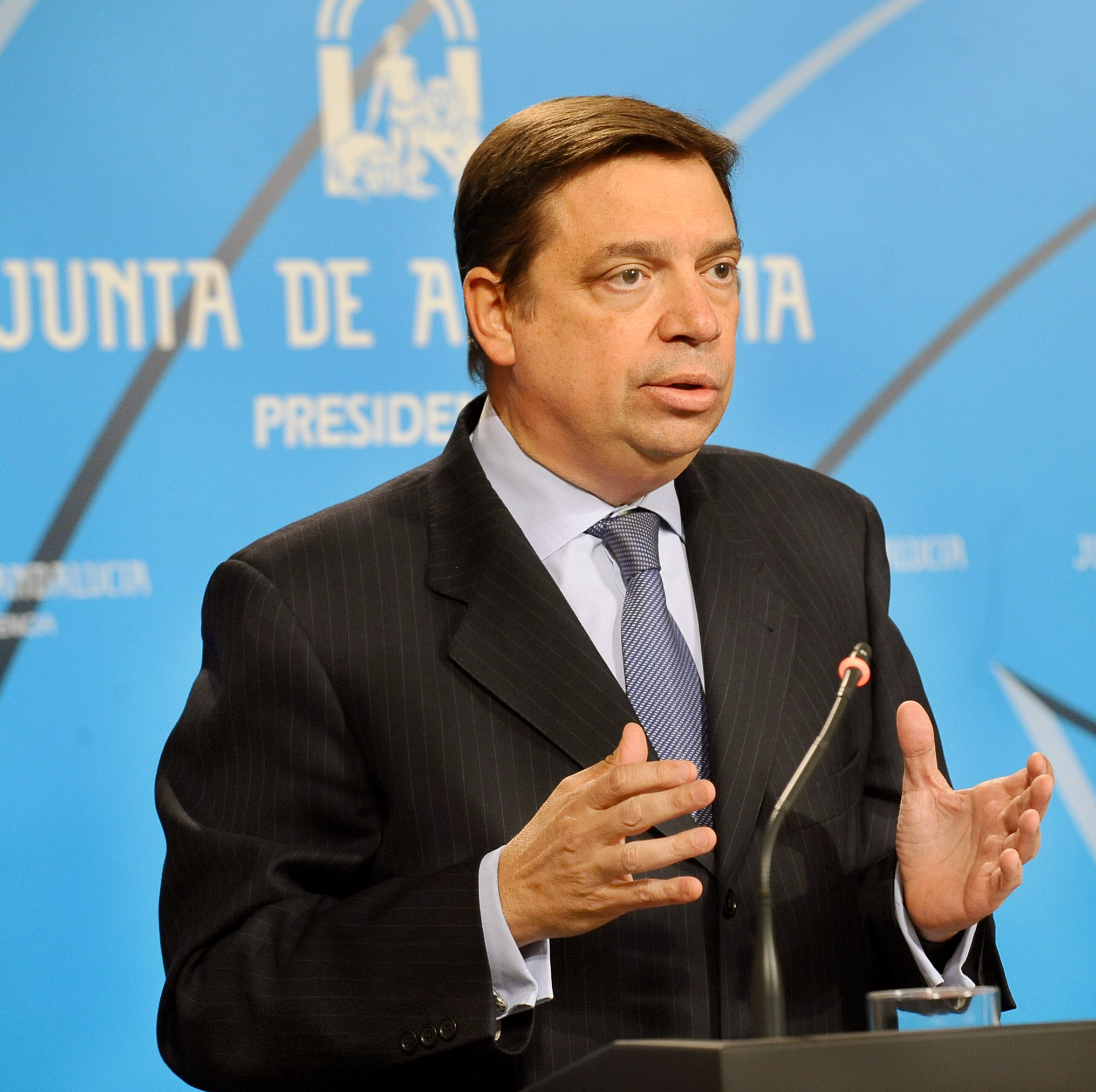
Luis Planas Puchades, former secretary general of the European Economic and Social Committee (EESC)

The secretary-general heads the Secretariat of the European Economic and Social Committee (EESC). About seven hundred EESC officials work in the EESC Secretariat. Some 350 of those work in the 'joint services', a special shared service established together with the Committee of the Regions.

The chief role of the EESC's secretary-general is to implement decisions taken by the Plenary Assembly, the bureau and the president. The secretary-general is also responsible for managing the administration and the budget.

Appointed by the bureau of the committee, the secretary-general serves for a renewable term of five years. The current secretary-general is Gianluca Brunetti, whose term began on 14 November 2018.

== List of secretaries-general ==
- 2024 – present Isabelle Le Galo Flores (Spain)
- 2018 – 2023 Gianluca Brunetti (Italy)
- 2014 – 2018 Luis Planas Puchades (Spain)
- 2008 – 2013 Martin Westlake (United Kingdom)
- 1998 – 2008 Patrick Venturini (France)
- 1996 – 1998 Adriano Graziosi (Italy)
- 1992 – 1996 Simon-Pierre Nothomb (Belgium)
- 1987 – 1992 Jacques Moreau (France)
- 1979 – 1987 Roger Louet (France)
- 1971 – 1978 Delfo Delfini (Italy)
- 1958 – 1971 Jacques Genton (France)
