= Concert Noble =

Ballroom in Brussels, Belgium

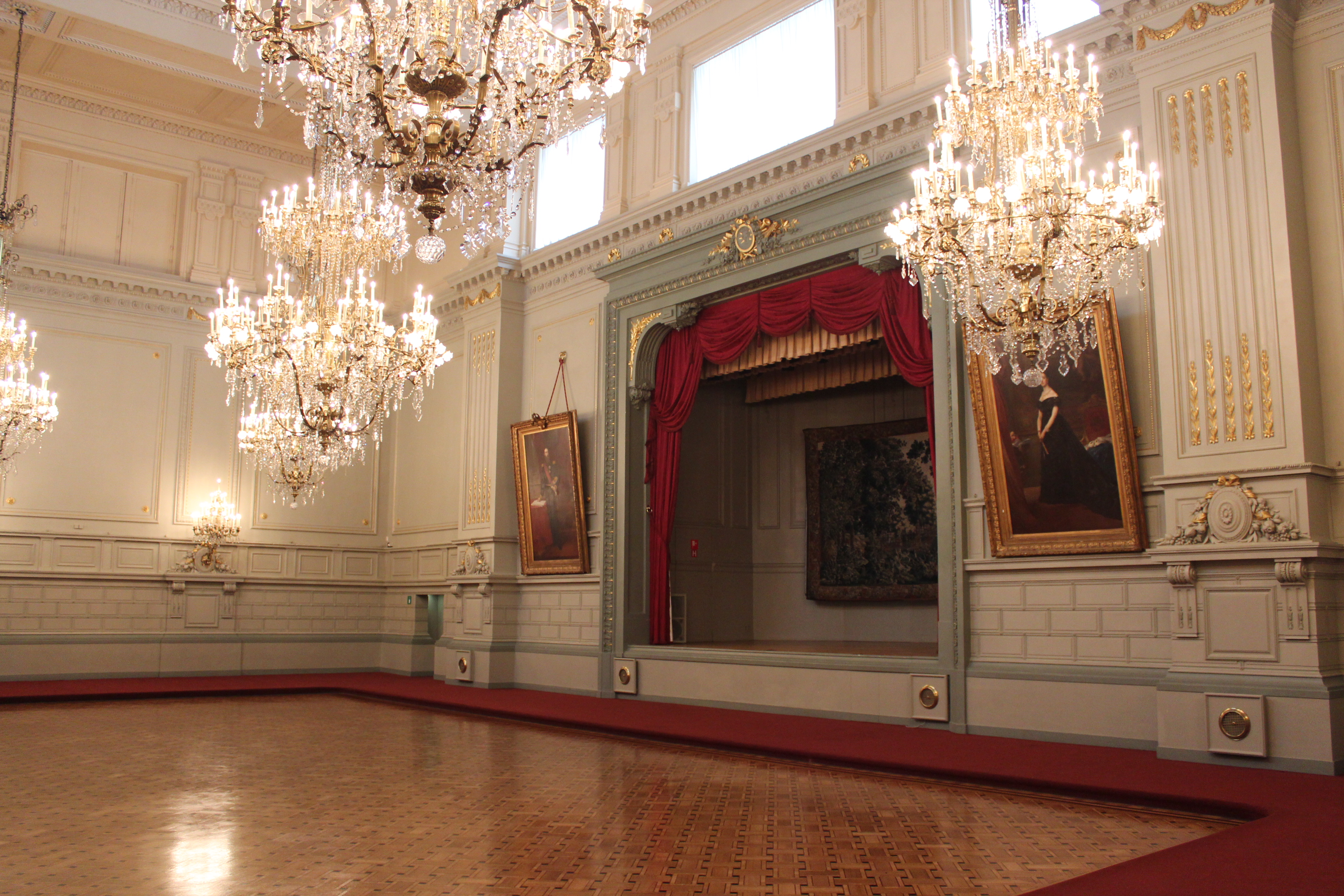
- Ballroom with portraits of King Leopold II and Queen Marie Henriette
- Interactive map of Concert Noble
- Address: Rue d'Arlon / Aarlenstraat 82; 1000 City of Brussels, Brussels-Capital Region; Belgium
- Coordinates: 50°50′32″N 4°22′24″E
- Type: Ballroom

Construction
- Opened: 1878

Website
- www.edificio.be/en/concert-noble

The Concert Noble is a ballroom built by Hendrik Beyaert in Brussels, Belgium. It is located in the Leopold Quarter, at 82, rue d'Arlon/Aarlenstraat, between the Rue Belliard/Belliardstraat and the Rue de la Loi/Wetsraat.

== History ==
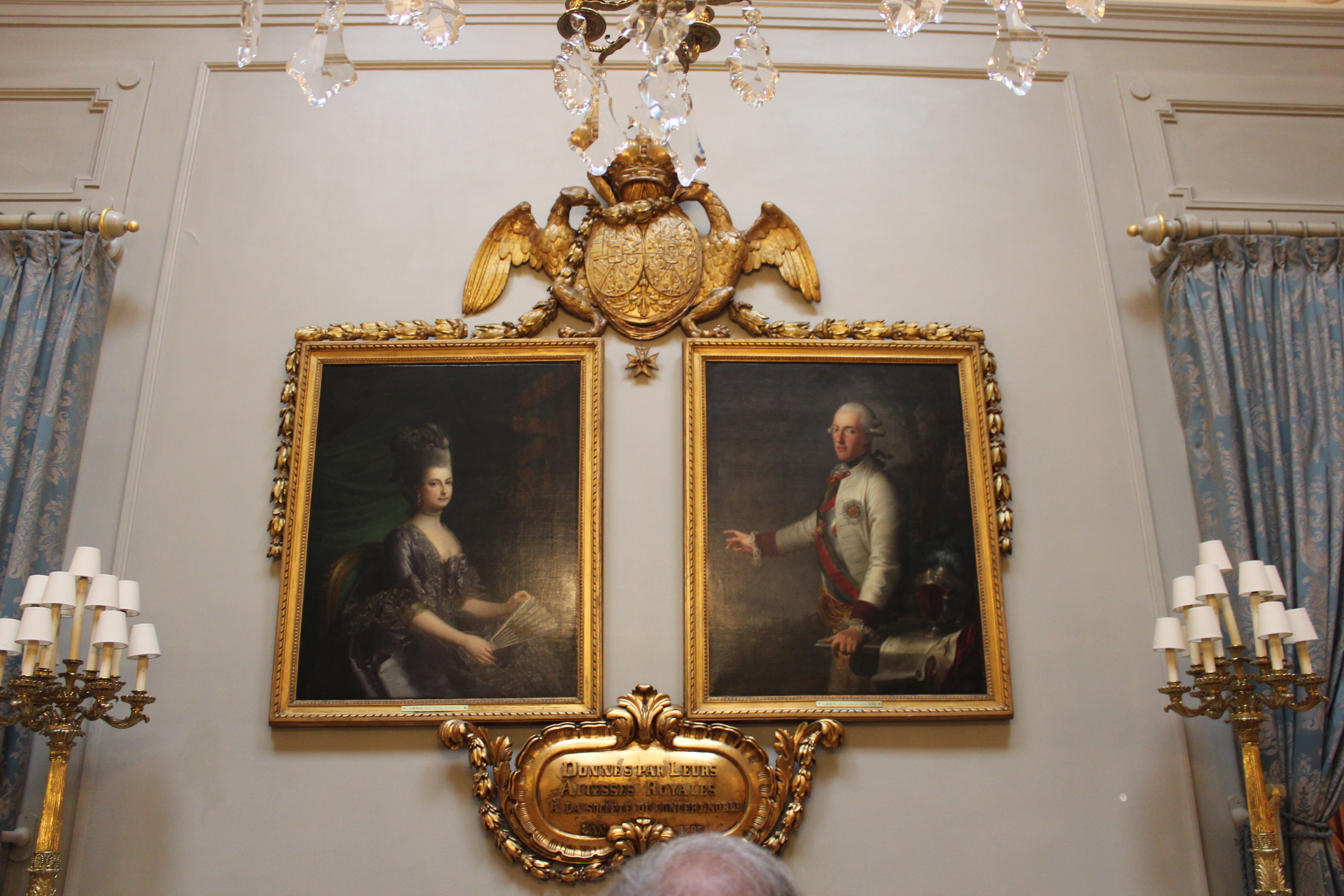
Portraits of Duchess Maria Christina and Duke Albert Casimir

The Concert Noble Society was founded in 1785 by Maria Christina, Duchess of Teschen, and her husband Albert Casimir, Duke of Teschen, whose portraits hang in the building. The current building was constructed under King Leopold II in 1873. The ornate rooms are decorated with several portraits of the Belgian royal family.

In the final decades of the 20th century, the rooms were listed as protected heritage and restored in their original style. The rooms can still be rented for private social events.

== Use ==
The rooms are used as the setting for balls attended by the Belgian, Austrian and Hungarian nobility. The Belgian elite often prefer to hold their society events in this old ball room. The rooms are also sometimes used for international meetings. In 2016, then-United States Secretary of State, John Kerry, used the rooms for a lecture.

== See also ==
- List of concert halls
- History of Brussels
- Culture of Belgium
- Belgium in the long nineteenth century
