= Gianluca Brunetti =

Italian civil servant

Secretary-General of the European Economic and Social Committee
- In office 14 November 2018 – 31 December 2023
- Preceded by: Luis Planas Puchades

Personal details
- Born: Gianluca Brunetti; 1 June 1962 (age 64) Naples, Italy
- Education: University of Naples Federico II
- Website: Official website

Gianluca Brunetti (born 1 June 1962 in Naples, Italy) is an Italian civil servant who has been serving as Secretary-General of the European Economic and Social Committee (EESC) between 14 November 2018 and Dec 31, 2023, when he was replaced by Isabelle Le Galo Flores.

== Biography ==
Gianluca Brunetti was born and raised in Naples, Italy. After graduating from high school, he obtained a degree in political sciences from the University of Naples Federico II, where his field of study was international politics with a specialisation in European Union law and politics. He also took courses in leadership and organisational change at Harvard Business School, Stanford University and the University of California, Berkeley.

Brunetti's mother tongue is Italian; he is fluent in French, English and Spanish, and speaks some German.

He started his career in 1985, as a lecturer in health law and social legislation at the Naples local health authority. From 1986 to 1990 he worked at the Council of Europe in Strasbourg, where, in 1989, he also lectured in public international law at University of Strasbourg's Institute for Translators, and Interpreters and International Relations. In January 1991, he became deputy head of the Council of Europe's Liaison Office with the European institutions in Brussels. In May of the same year, he joined the secretariat of the European Parliament's Foreign Affairs Committee, where he stayed until 2000, when he moved to its Economic and Monetary Affairs Committee. Between 2002 and 2004, Brunetti was the European Parliament's adviser for internal organisation. He was appointed head of staff relations in May 2004, and became head of internal organisation and human resources in 2006.

In 2010, Brunetti moved to the European Economic and Social Committee (EESC) as director of human resources and internal services, and later became director of human resources and finance in an internal reorganisation in 2017. A year later, he was appointed Secretary-General of the EESC.

In 2024 he was granted by the President of the Italian Republic the decoration of Cavaliere dell’Ordine della Stella d’Italia for the engagement and achievements throughout his career in the european institutions, namely as Secretary General of the EESC.
