= Rue Belliard =

Street in Brussels, Belgium

Rue Belliard (French); Belliardstraat (Dutch)
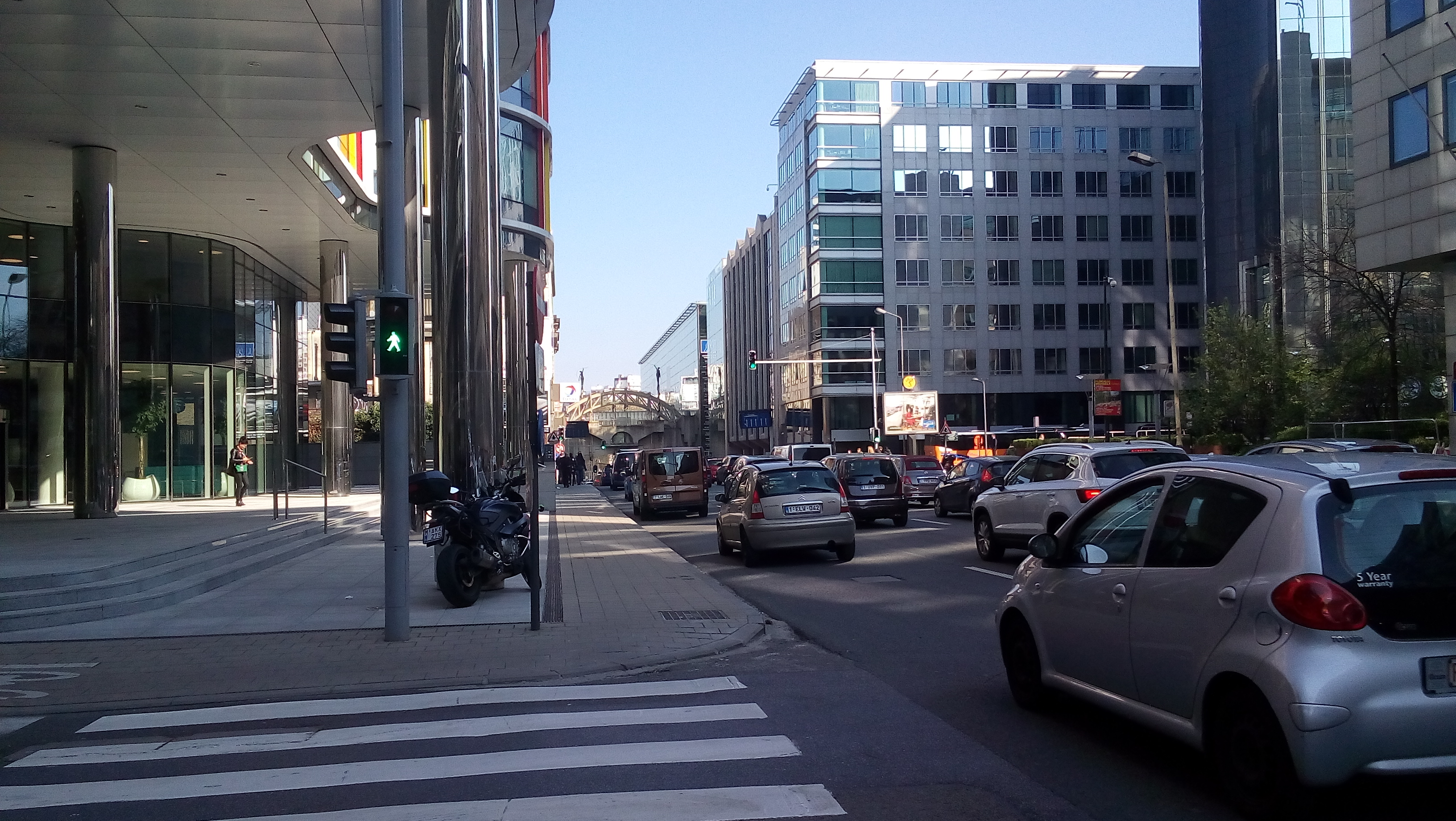
- View of the Rue Belliard/Belliardstraat from the Rue de Trêves/Trierstraat

- Location within Brussels Location within Belgium
- Namesake: Augustin Daniel Belliard
- Type: Street
- Location: City of Brussels and Etterbeek, Brussels-Capital Region, Belgium
- Quarter: Leopold Quarter
- Postal code: 1000, 1040
- Coordinates: 50°50′27″N 04°22′34″E

The Rue Belliard (French) or Belliardstraat (Dutch) is a major street in the European Quarter of Brussels, Belgium, running parallel to the Rue de la Loi/Wetstraat. Both are one-way streets; where traffic in the Rue de la Loi runs in the western direction towards Brussels' city centre, the Rue Belliard runs in the eastern direction, away from the city centre.

The street runs from the east of the Small Ring (Brussels' inner ring road) to the south-western corner of the Parc du Cinquantenaire/Jubelpark. The street has four lanes from the Small Ring to the start of the Belliard Tunnel, two lanes along Leopold Park and ends on one lane up to the Cinquantenaire. The section on one lane from one park to the other is partly in the territory of the municipality of Etterbeek. The rest of the street is in the territory of the City of Brussels.

The Rue Belliard is named after Augustin Daniel Belliard, a French general who was governor of the department of the Dyle.

== Buildings ==
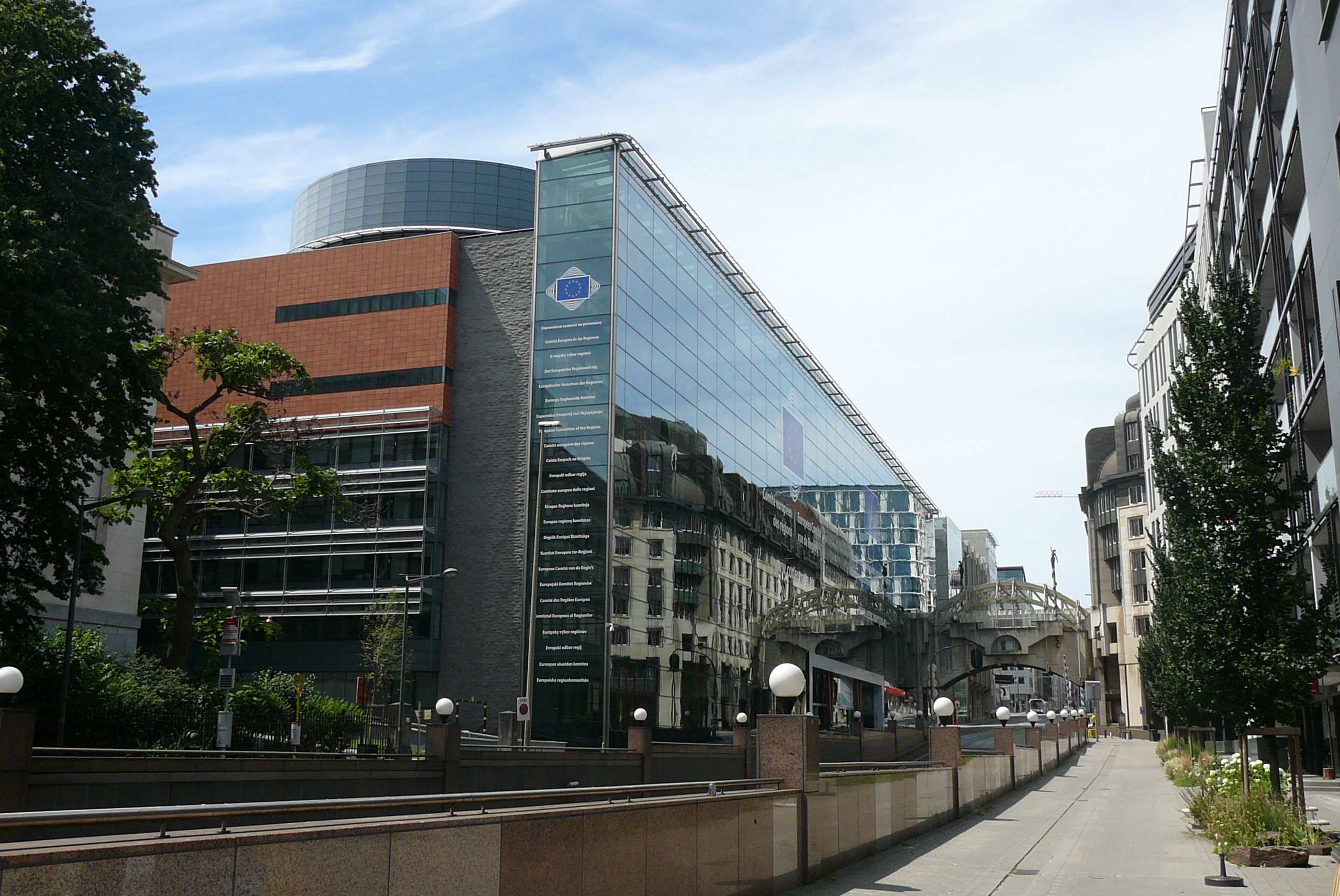
The Jacques Delors building, Rue Belliard/Belliardstraat 99–101

The first part of the Rue Belliard (from the Avenue des Arts/Kunstlaan until the Rue van Maerlant/Van Maerlantstraat) was opened in 1855, while the second part of the street (until the Cinquantenaire) was finished in 1869.

- No. 7: European Commission
- No. 15–17: Embassy of Bosnia and Herzegovina
- No. 14–18: Federal Planning Bureau (FPB) of Belgium
- No. 25–33: National Lottery (Belgium)
- No. 28: European Commission
- No. 40: Odas Global Consulting Ltd.
- No. 41–43: Permanent Representation of Lithuania to the European Union
- No. 58: Goethe-Institut
- No. 60–62: Permanent Representation of German State Baden-Württemberg to the European Union
- No. 65: Red Cross European Union Office
- No. 99–101: Delors building, home of the European Economic and Social Committee and Committee of the Regions
- No. 100: European Commission
- No. 135: House of European History (HEH) in Leopold Park
- No. 137: Former Solvay Library in Leopold Park
- No. 199: Greenpeace European Union Office

== See also ==
- List of streets in Brussels
- Brussels and the European Union
- History of Brussels
- Belgium in the long nineteenth century
