= Hendrik Beyaert =

Belgian architect

Hendrik (Henri) Beyaert
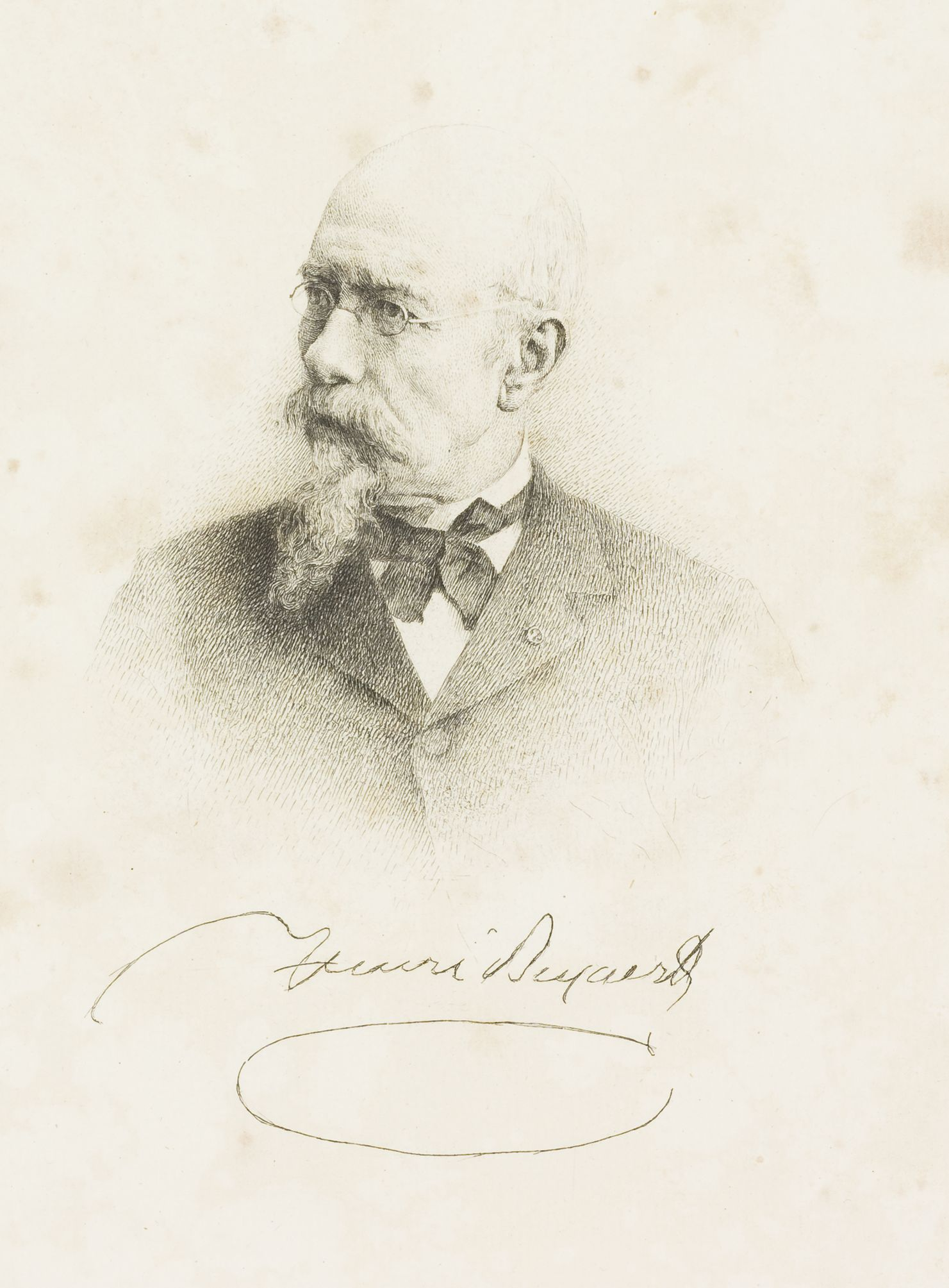
- Born: 29 July 1823; Kortrijk, Belgium
- Died: 22 January 1894 (aged 70); Brussels, Belgium
- Occupation: Architect
- Buildings: Head Office of the National Bank of Belgium, in Brussels Office of the National Bank of Belgium, in Antwerp; Tournai railway station in Tournai House of Cats in Brussels

Hendrik Beyaert (Dutch) or Henri Beyaert (French) (29 July 1823 – 22 January 1894) was a Belgian architect. He is responsible for the designs of the Palace of the Nation, the National Bank of Belgium and Bornem Castle, among many other significant buildings.

== Biography ==
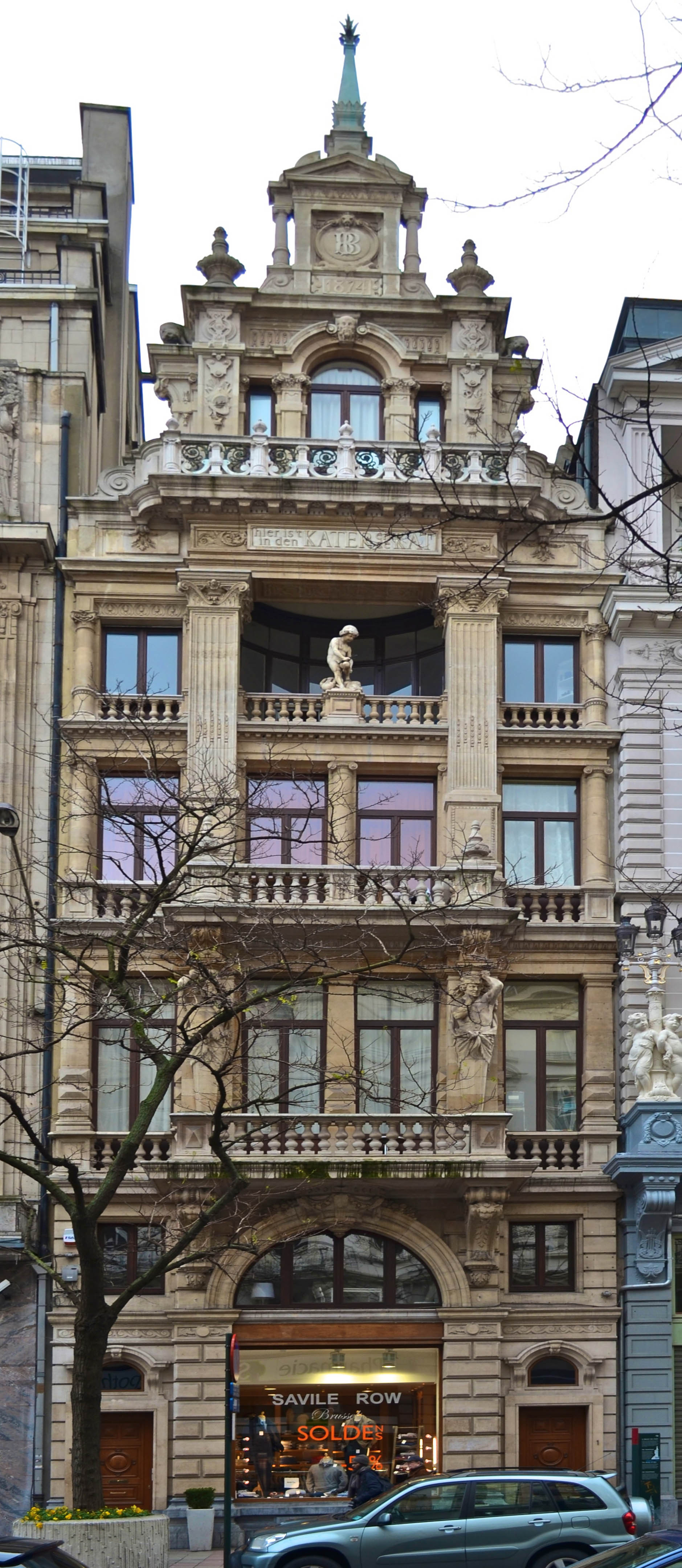
Maison des Chats or Hier is't in den kater en de kat, Boulevard Adolphe Max/Adolphe Maxlaan, Brussels

Beyaert was of very humble descent. For this reason he had to earn his living from a very young age onwards. Initially he and his family could not afford to finance higher studies. At age 19, Beyaert worked as a bank employee at the National Bank of Belgium's office in his native city, Kortrijk. He found his profession not very indulging and decided to quit the bank. As he had always been fascinated by architecture, he found a post as an apprentice stonemason on the building site of the new railway station of Tournai, a building that would be replaced decades later by a design of Beyaert himself.

In 1842, Beyaert went to Brussels where he kept a small bookshop to earn his living and where he enrolled at the Royal Academy of Fine Arts to attend architectural courses. The following year, he met the architect Félix Janlet who believed in the young Beyaert's exceptional qualities and who offered him a job in his office. Due to this job and to a small scholarship granted to him by the city of Kortrijk, Beyaert could finish his architectural studies at the Academy, which he completed in 1846. There, he studied with Tilman-François Suys whom he was largely influenced by during the first years of his career as an independent architect. Beyaert gradually moved away from the neoclassical style of his master and began to experiment with a neo-Louis XVI style in the mansions he built along the Avenue des Arts/Kunstlaan and the Chaussée de Charleroi/Charleroise Steenweg in Brussels.

Beyaert's first public commission was the Head Office of his former employer, the National Bank of Belgium (1859–1867). This cooperation with the architect Wynand Janssens resulted in a lavish neo-Baroque building heavily influenced by the new style propagated in Paris, known as Second Empire. The critical success that it enjoyed, together with Beyaert's connections with the powerful Liberal Party, led to many other commissions, beginning with the De Brouckère fountain (1866), now on the Square Jan Palfijn/Jan Palfijnplein in Laeken. Other major works followed in rapid succession. In his major renovation projects of medieval buildings, such as the Halle Gate (a vestige of the medieval fortifications of Brussels), he was influenced by the French architect and theoretician Viollet-le-Duc. This realisation played an important role in Beyaert's architectural development for it made him aware of the importance and beauty of the local architectural styles from the late Middle Ages and the early Renaissance. Beyaert's style largely shifted to the so-called "Flemish Renaissance Revival" which, partly under his influence, would become a very popular "national" style in the last quarter of the 19th century. Other works included the Antwerp office of the National Bank of Belgium (1874–1879), built on a clever triangular plan, Tournai railway station (1875–1879, damaged in World War II), and the Kegeljan-Godin House (1878–1880) in Namur. All had a similar, vaguely Flemish Renaissance or Baroque Revival flavour. In 1876, however, Beyaert publicly denied being a partisan of the nascent Flemish Renaissance Revival movement in Belgium, although the proponents of this movement had wished to align his creations to their own.

With his passion for study and novelties (Beyaert possessed an extensive library on the history of architecture and the decorative arts), his buildings became increasingly charged with historical ornamentation, without however lacking a clear structural basis. In an architectural contest following the covering of the river Senne (1867–1871), Beyaert's Maison des Chats or Hier is't in den kater en de kat (loosely, "House of Cats") took first prize. It was built along the new central boulevards in Brussels and showed clear affinities with the famous Guild Houses at the nearby Grand-Place/Grote Markt (Brussels' main square). Beyaert also designed a number of country houses, including the "Romantic" Château de Faulx-les-Tombes near Namur (1872), which was highly influenced by Viollet-le-Duc's restoration of the Château de Pierrefonds, and the Flemish Renaissance Revival Castle of Wespelaar (1881–87) in the province of Brabant.

Although Beyaert had been interested in urban planning since the early 1860s, he could only realise one of his urban design projects: the Petit Sablon Square (1880) in Brussels. It consists of a small park on a trapezium-shaped site, surrounded by a wrought-iron fence of inventive design. His final realisation, crowning an impressive architectural career, is the Ministry of Railways, Post, Telegraph and Navy in Brussels. This project shows Beyaert's ability to cope with a rich ornamentation without attacking the structural integrity of the building. While certainly revivalist in character, his strongly geometric architecture imitated only the spirit and seldom the details of historical models. His own details were highly original. They were part of an architecture of space and structure rather than of mere decorative appearance. In this respect, Beyaert would become instrumental in the formation of a new generation of architects, such as Paul Hankar and Victor Horta, that would play an important part in the evolution of Art Nouveau architecture. He became a member of the Royal Academy of Science, Letters and Fine Arts of Belgium in 1888.

== List of works ==
=== Private commissions ===
- 1851: Mansion, Avenue des Arts/Kunstlaan 26, in Brussels
- 1858–1860: Mansions, Chaussée de Charleroi/Charleroise Steenweg 5–7–9, in Brussels
- 1865–1868: Faulx-les-Tombes Castle (Château de Faulx-les-Tombes), in Faulx-les-Tombes (renovations and extensions)
- 1870: Concert Noble ballroom, Rue d'Arlon/Aarlenstraat 82, in Brussels
- 1874: Maison des Chats or Hier is't in den kater en de kat, Boulevard Adolphe Max/Adolphe Maxlaan 1, in Brussels
- 1880: Kegeljan-Godin House in Namur
- 1881–1883: Wespelaar Castle in Wespelaar (demolished)
- 1883–1894: Bornem Castle (Château Marnix de Sainte-Aldegonde), in Bornem (renovations and extensions)
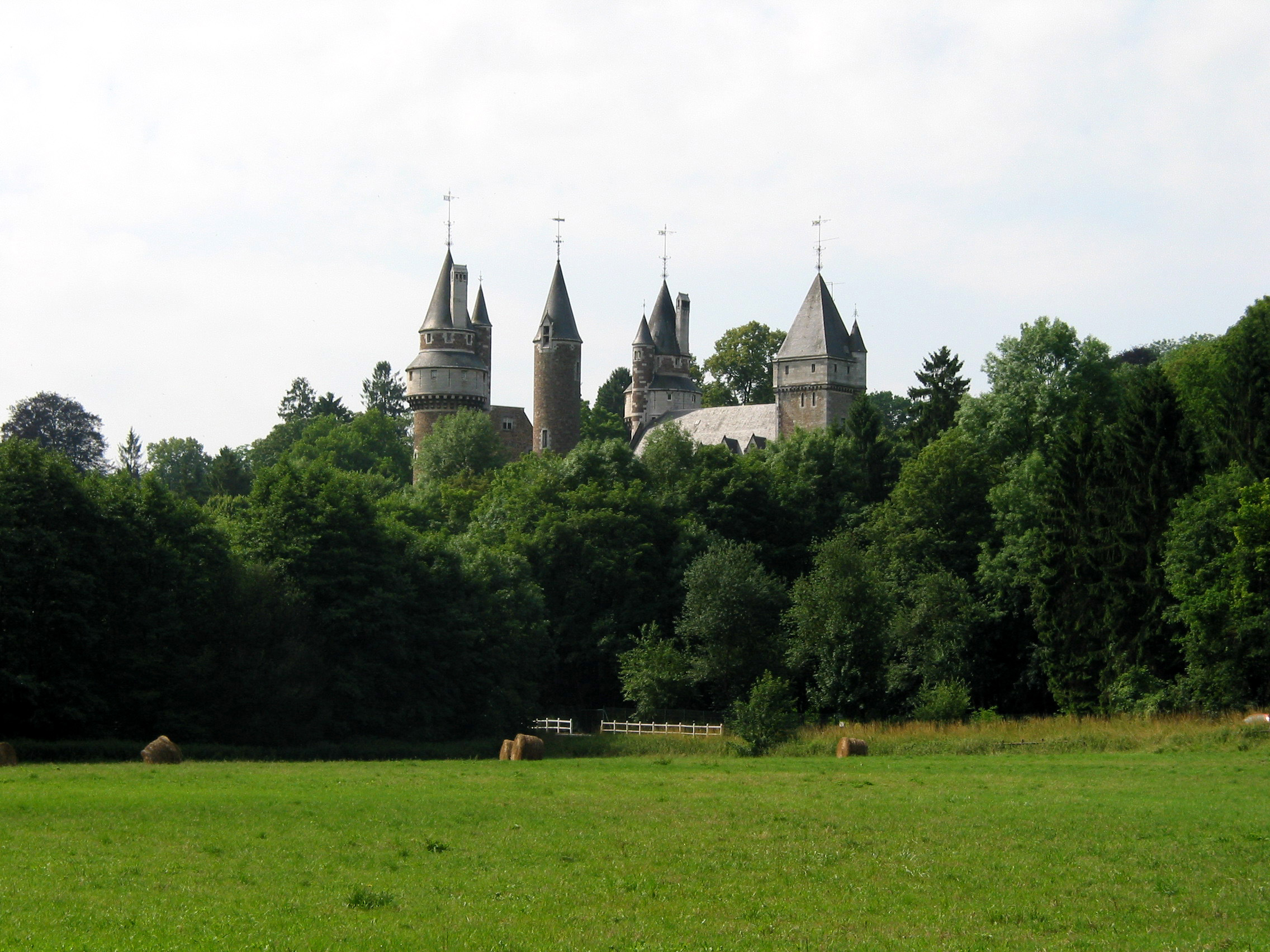
Faulx-les-Tombes Castle (1865–1868)

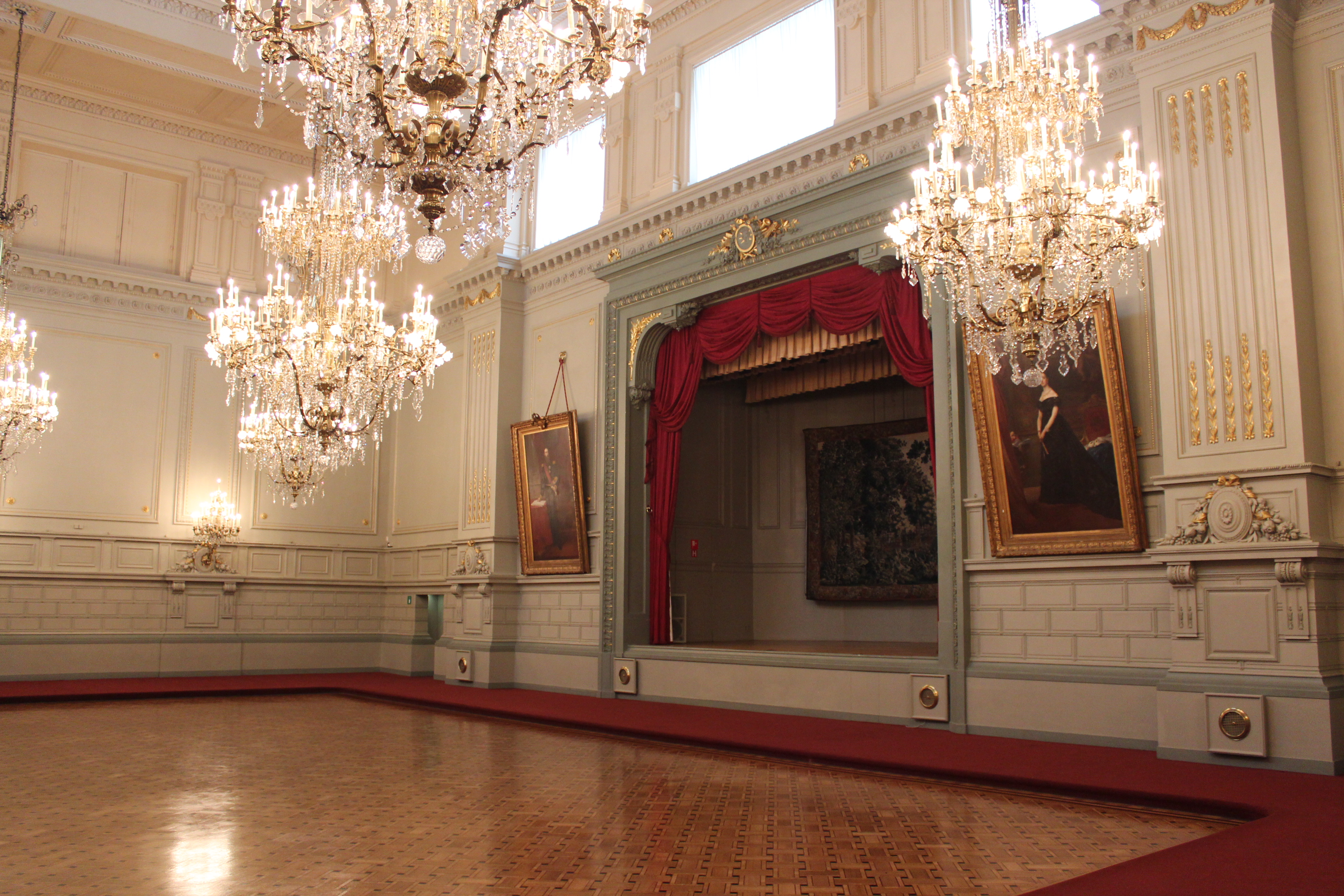
Concert Noble, Brussels (1870)

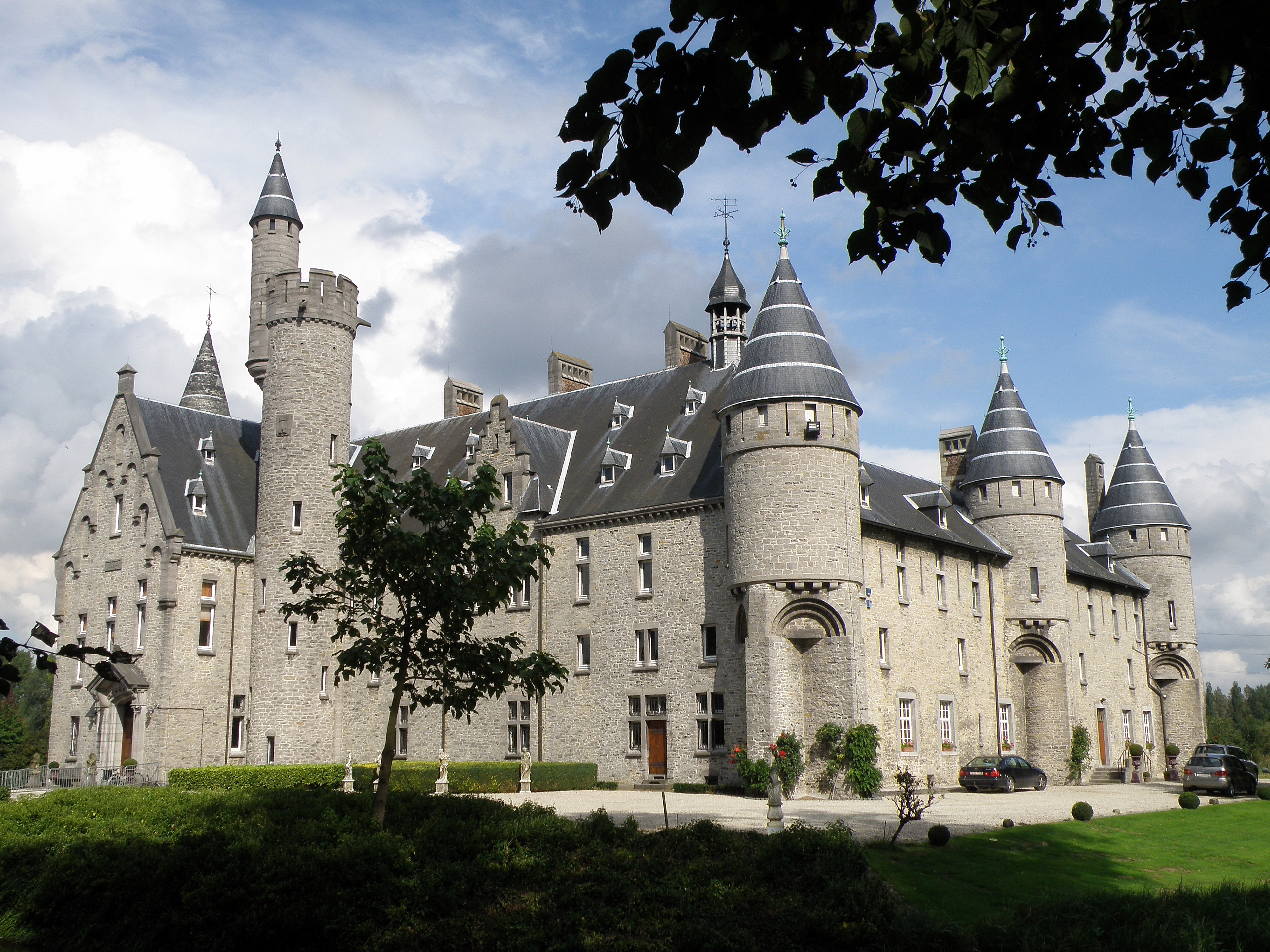
Bornem Castle, Bornem (1883–1894)

=== Public and semi-public commissions ===
- 1859–1867: Head Office of the National Bank of Belgium, Rue du Bois-Sauvage/Wildewoudstraat, in Brussels
- 1860–1878: Office of the National Bank of Belgium, Berlaymontlaan, today Frankrijklei, in Antwerp
- 1866: De Brouckère Fountain, Porte de Namur/Naamsepoort, in Brussels (moved in 1957 to the Square Jean Palfijn/Jan Palfijnsquare, in Laeken)
- 1868–1871: Restoration and conversion into a museum of the Halle Gate (a former city gate), in Brussels
- 1874–1879: Tournai railway station (Gare et entrepôt des douanes), in Tournai
- 1875–1879: Office building of the National Bank of Belgium, in Antwerp
- 1876–1877: School in Soignies
- 1879–1882: Church of St. Joseph des Tombes, in Faulx-les-Tombes (decoration by the architect Paul Hankar)
- 1879–1899: Square du Petit Sablon/Kleine Zavelsquare, in Brussels
- 1883–1886: Palace of the Nation, Rue de la Loi/Wetstraat, in Brussels (reconstruction and renovation)
- 1886–1894: St. Martin's Church (Sint-Martinuskerk), in Everberg (restoration and extension; decoration Paul Hankar and Adolphe Crespin)
- 1890: Office building for the Caisse générale d'épargne et de retraite (ASLK/CGER), Rue Fossé aux Loups/Wolvengracht, in Brussels
- 1890–1894: Ministry of Railways, Post, Telegraph and Navy, Rue de Louvain/Leuvensestraat, in Brussels
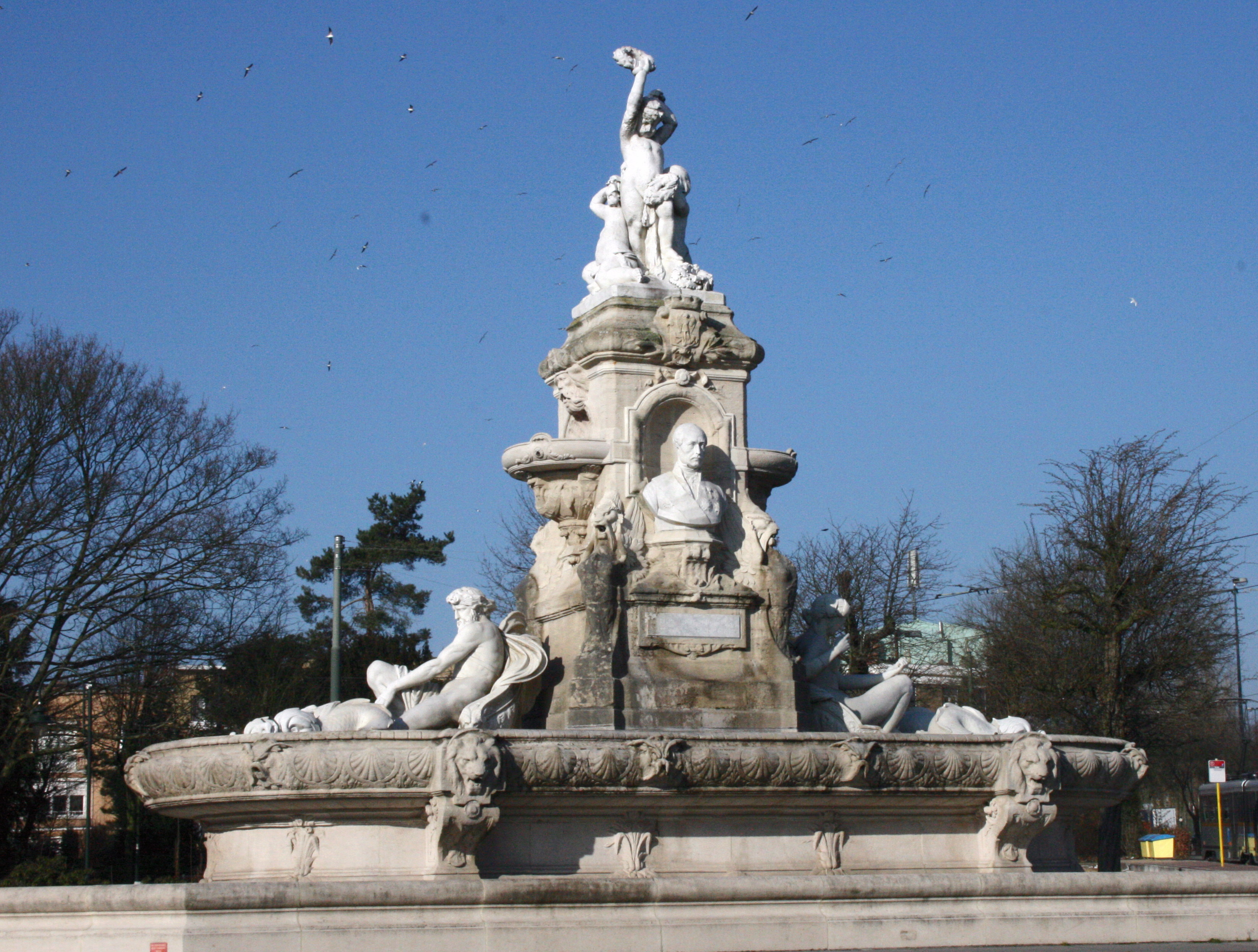
De Brouckère Fountain, Brussels (1866)

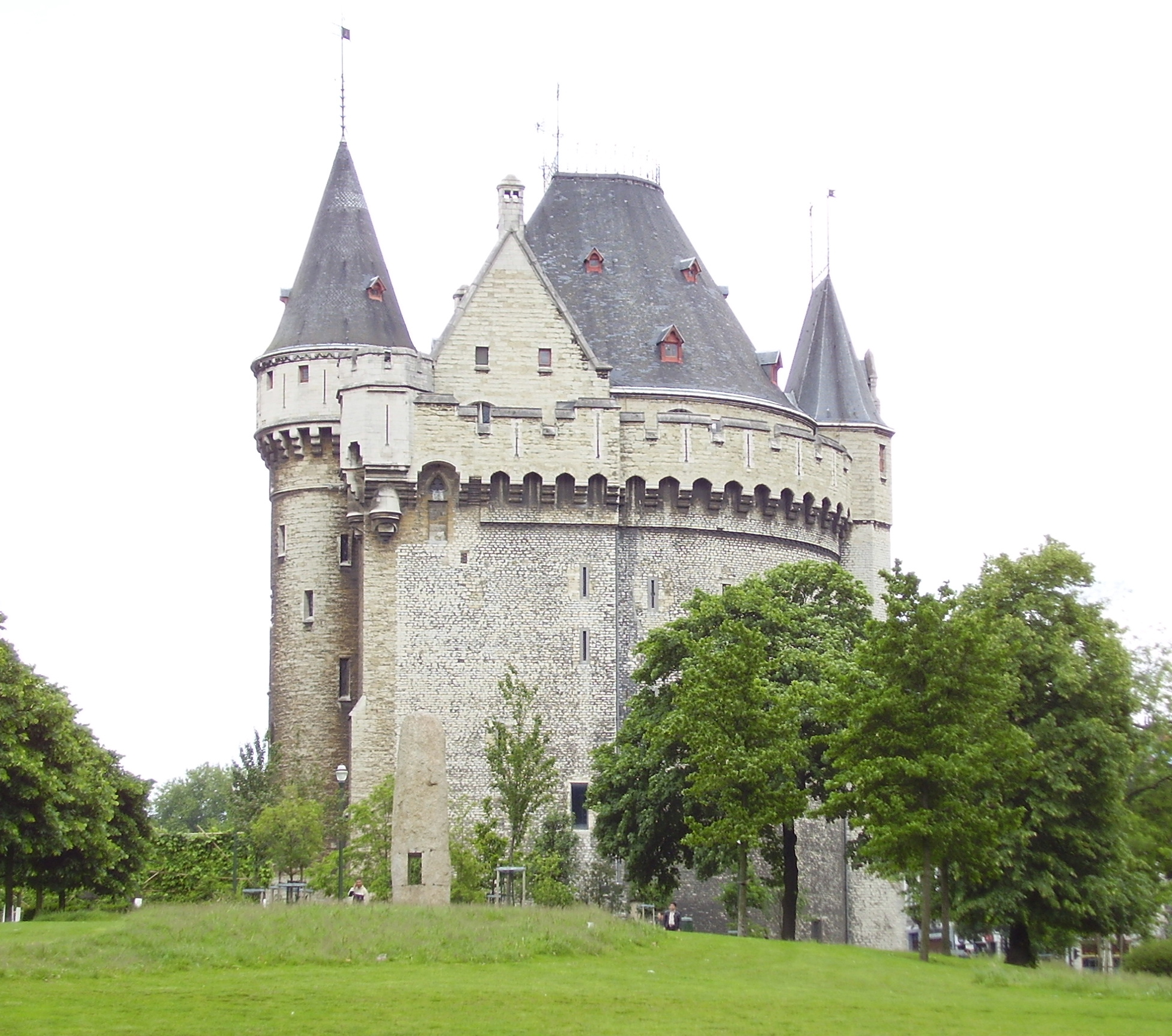
Halle Gate, Brussels (1868–1871)

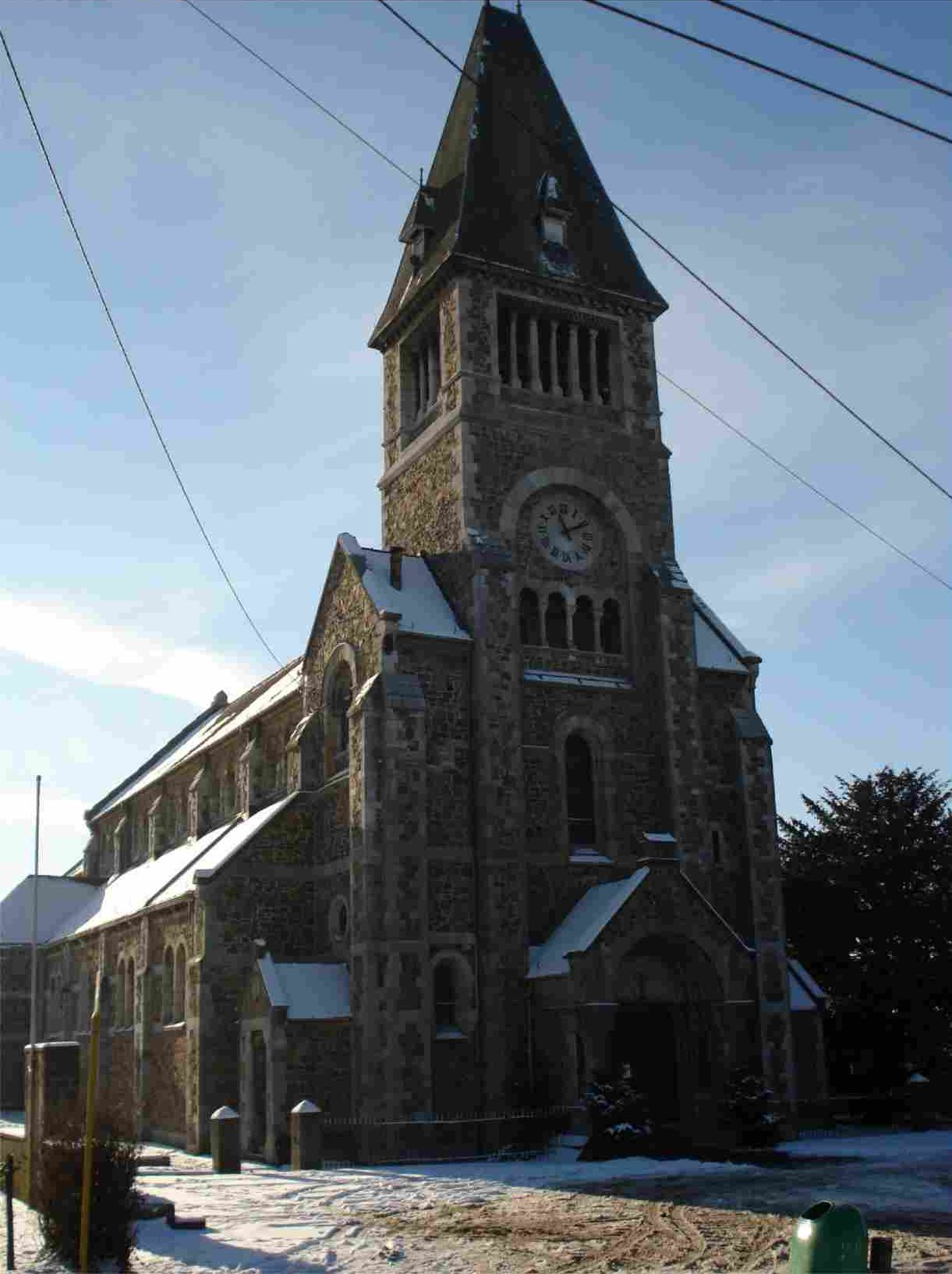
Church of St. Joseph des Tombes, Faulx-les-Tombes (1879–1882)

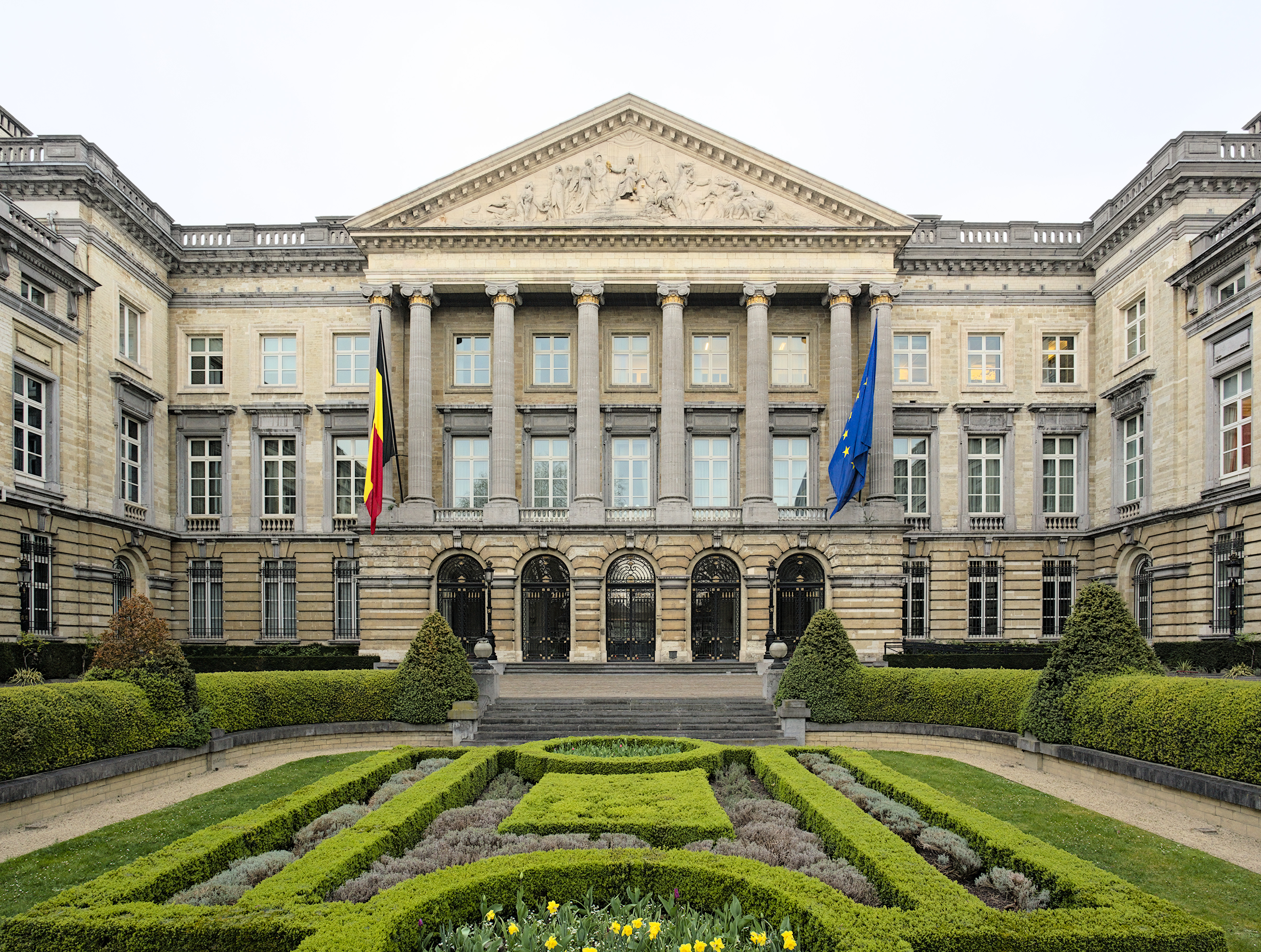
Palace of the Nation, Brussels (1883–1886)
