= Delors building =

Building in Brussels, Belgium

Jacques Delors building
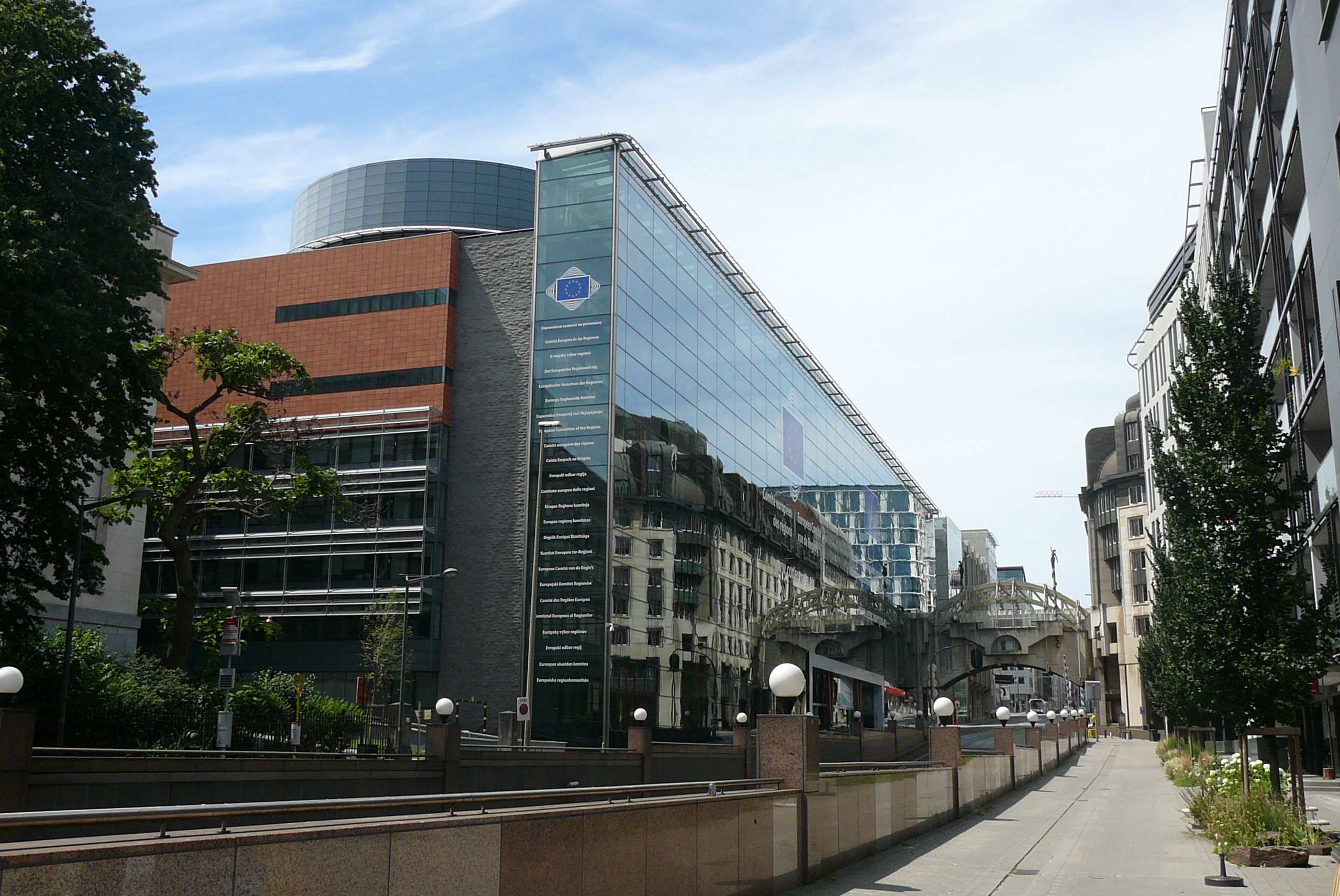
- The Jacques Delors building in Brussels

General information
- Type: Office building
- Location: Rue Belliard / Belliardstraat 99–101, 1040 City of Brussels, Brussels-Capital Region, Belgium
- Coordinates: 50°50′25.42″N 4°22′38.92″E
- Current tenants: Economic and Social Committee; Committee of the Regions

The Jacques Delors building is an office building in the European Quarter of Brussels, Belgium, which houses the European Economic and Social Committee and the Committee of the Regions. It is located at 99–101, rue Belliard/Belliardstraat, next to Leopold Park, and was formerly called the Belliard building.

The building housed the Brussels activities of the European Parliament until the 1990s, when these functions were moved to the new Espace Léopold. In the 2000s, it was renovated for use by the two Committees. In 2006, it was renamed the Jacques Delors building (abbreviated 'JDE'), after Jacques Delors, former President of the European Commission, who was the most prominent founder of the Committee of the Regions.

== See also ==
- Brussels and the European Union
- Institutional seats of the European Union
