= Isabelle Le Galo Flores =

Isabelle Le Galo
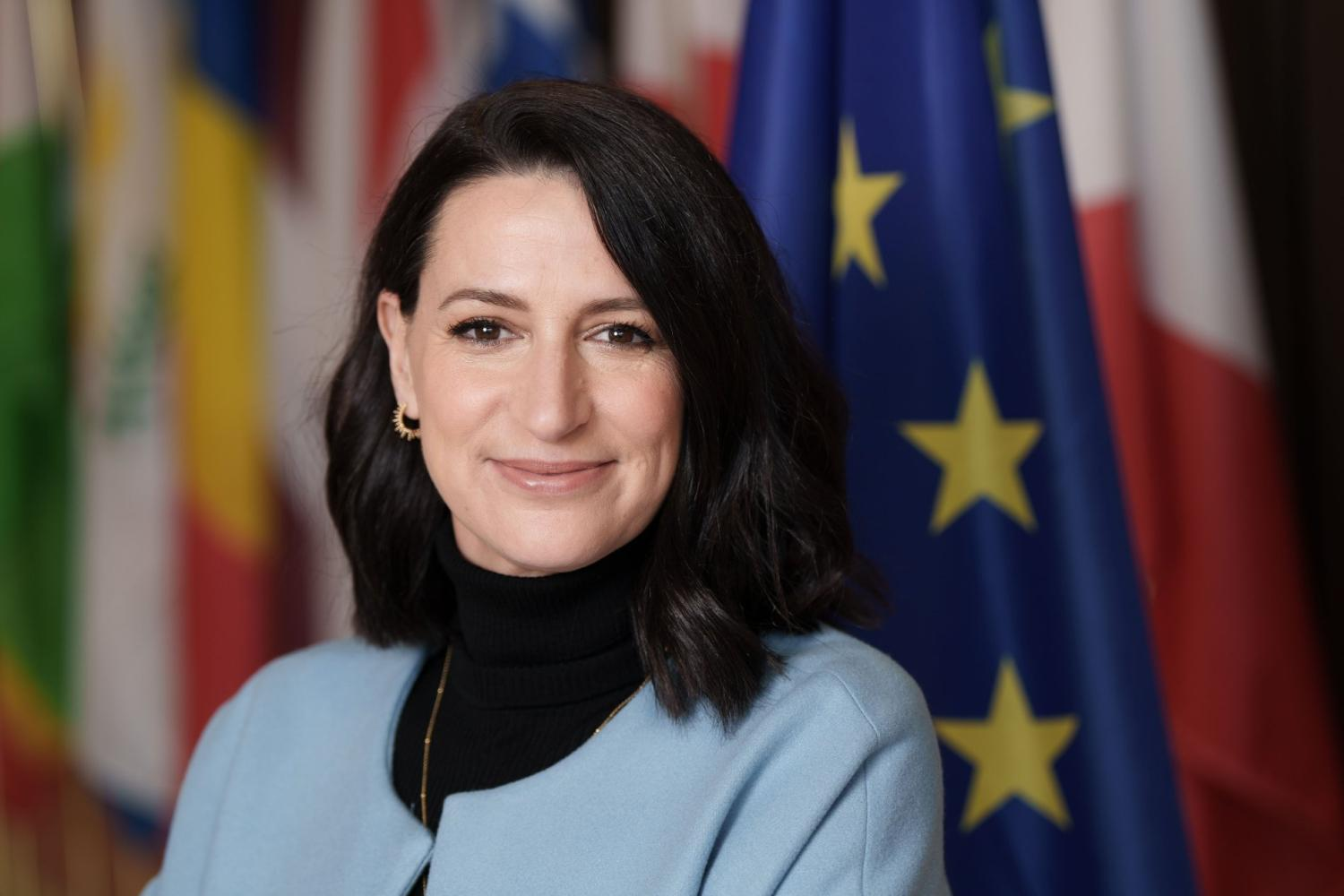
- Isabelle Le Galo
- Born: Isabelle Le Galo Flores; 1974 (age 51–52); Spain
- Occupation: Secretary-General of the European Economic and Social Committee (2024-)

Isabelle Le Galo Flores (Spain, 1974) is secretary general of the European Economic and Social Committee since Dec 2023.

She studied mathematical engineering at the Polytechnic Institute of Paris, and afterwards political science at Science Po in Paris, where she got a master's degree. She continued her studies at the University of Glasgow, getting a postgraduate degree in strategy and leadership.

She started a professional career empowering patients organizations from the health sector. She continued collaborating or working for various NGOs and foundations. Between 2014 and 2023 she served as director of the Daniel and Nina Carasso Foundation, a family foundation focused on citizen art and sustainable food. She is or has been board member of several organisations, like the Board of Directors of the Spanish Association of Foundations, of the board of the European and Spanish Philanthropic Coalitions for the Climate and the Museo Nacional Centro de Arte Reina Sofía in Madrid. She was defined as one of the Top 100 Women Leaders in Spain 2020.

In December 2023 she became the first woman serving as secretary general of the European Economic and Social Committee, replacing Gianluca Brunetti. She is French and Spanish by nationality.

In October 2026, the European Anti-Fraud Office (OLAF) referred allegations of corruption and the rigging of public contracts involving Isabelle Le Galo Flores to the European Public Prosecutor’s Office (EPPO) following an administrative investigation.
