= Faulx-les-Tombes Castle =

Castle in Wallonia, Belgium

- Wallonia, Belgium
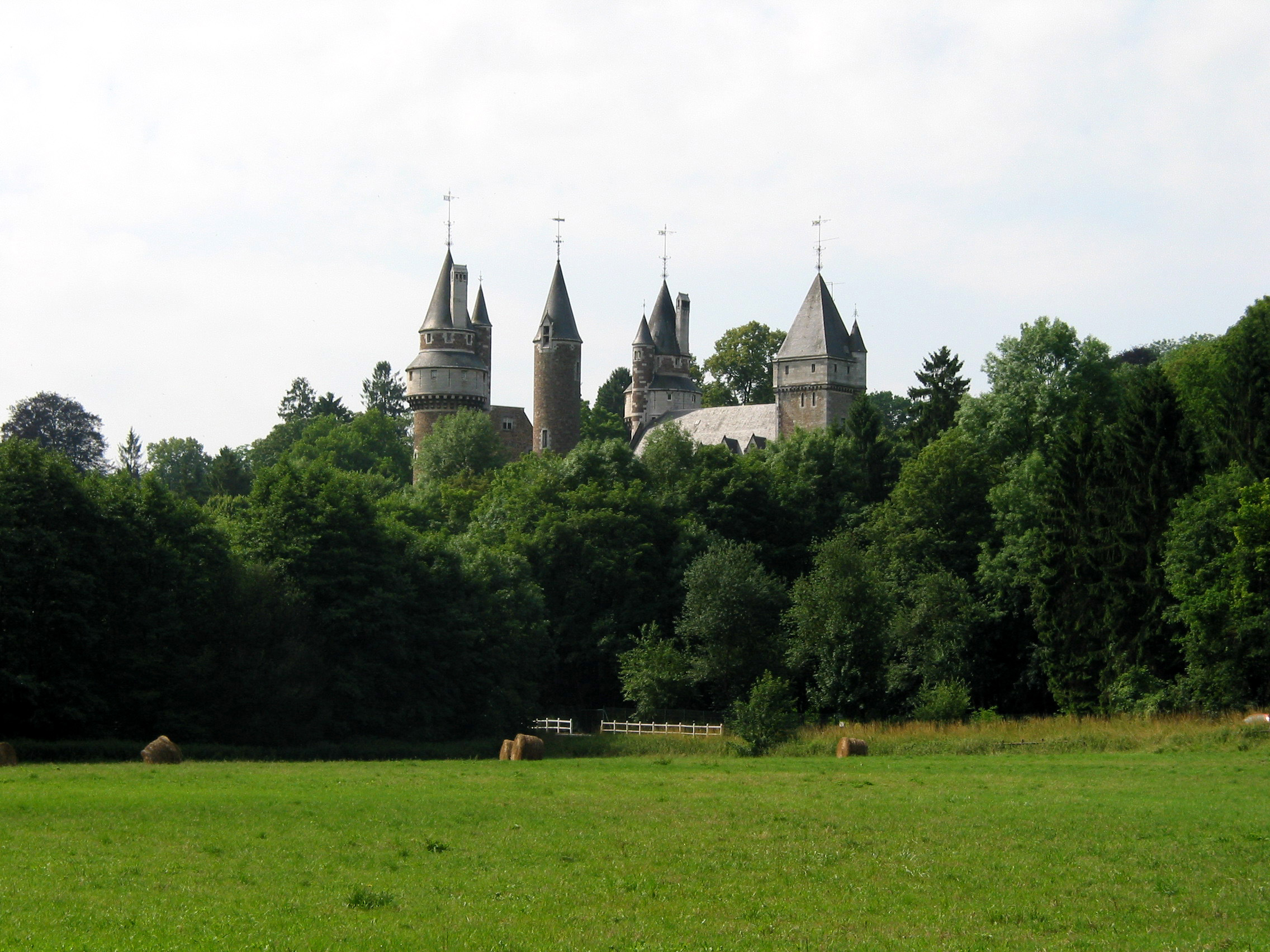

Site information
- Type: Castle

Location
- Coordinates: 50.428°N 4.999°E

Faulx-les-Tombes Castle (French: Château de Faulx-les-Tombes) is a 19th-century château in Faulx-les-Tombes in the municipality of Gesves, province of Namur, Wallonia, Belgium.

The first castle on the site was built in the 13th century and was a dependency of the County of Namur. In about 1340 it passed into the ownership of the Marbaix family. After several further changes in ownership it became the property of the Corswaren family in 1665 and remained theirs until the French Revolution.

The present Gothic revival building was built on the site of the first by the architect Henri Beyaert in 1872, but was badly damaged in a fire in 1961. In 1970 it was acquired by the town of Etterbeek, but has since become private property again, and is not accessible to the public.

== See also ==
- List of castles in Belgium
