= Grandpré Abbey =

Coordinates: 50°25′19″N 5°01′12″E

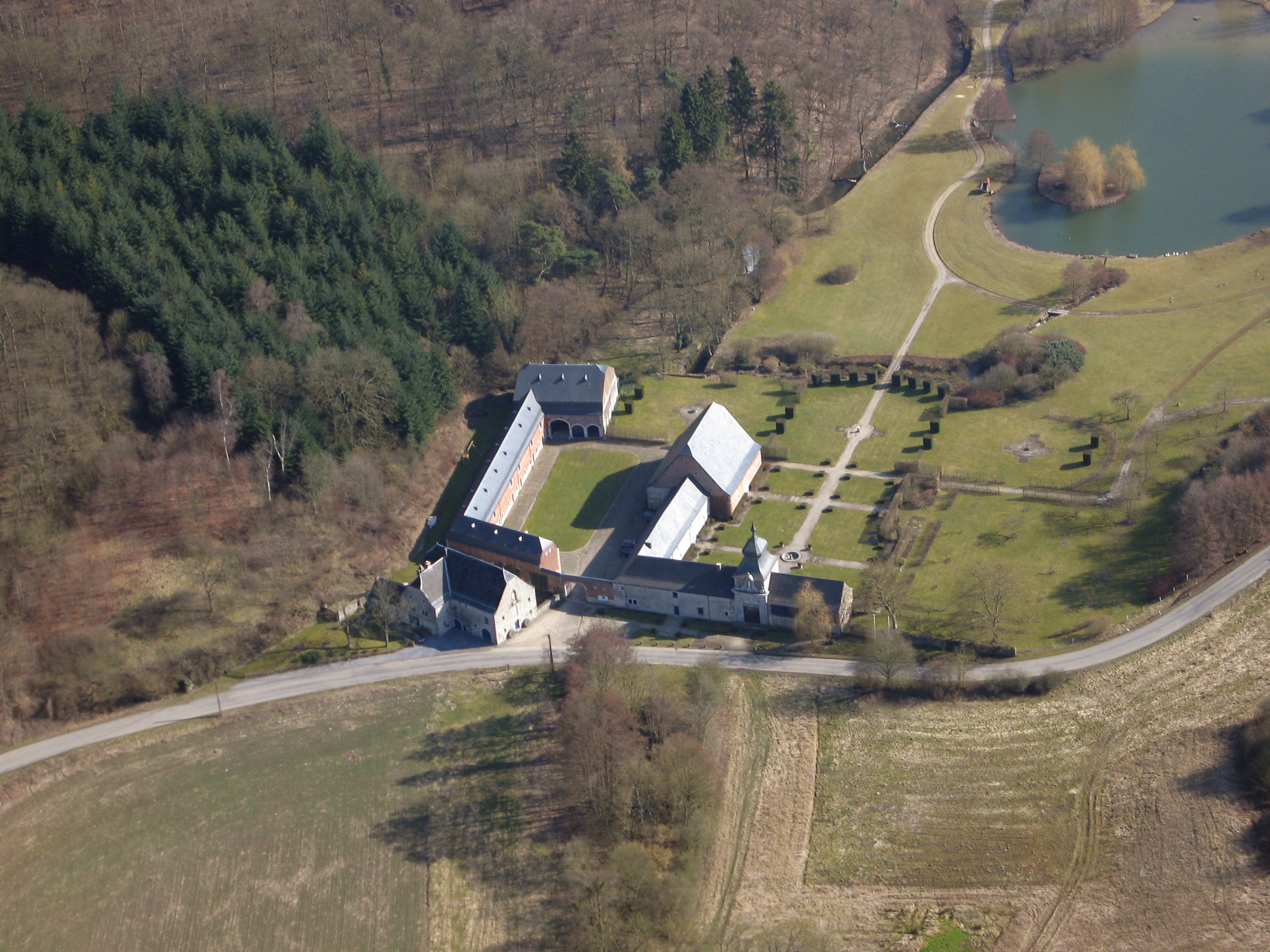
Aerial view of the site

Grandpré Abbey (French: Abbaye de Grandpré) is a former Cistercian abbey located at Faulx-les-Tombes (in the present municipality of Gesves), in the province of Namur, Wallonia, Belgium. The only remains of the abbey are the gatehouse and the attached range at the main entrance, the farm buildings and the mill, once powered by the Samson brook, which crosses the site.

== History ==
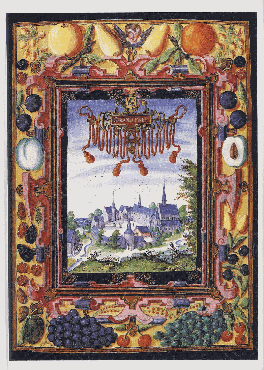
Grandpré Abbey 1604

The abbey was founded in 1231 as a daughter house of Villers-la-Ville Abbey, of the filiation of Clairvaux, on a site where a grange of Villers-la-Ville had stood since the early 13th century, by Henry I, Count of Vianden and Marquis of Namur, and his wife Margaret de Courtenay in memory of her brother Philip II, Marquis of Namur, who had died in 1226 during the Albigensian Crusade. The church was dedicated in 1232.

Grandpré was a small community and never thrived or achieved prominence. The number of monks was never more than 20, even though the abbey had a dozen farms in the environs. Nor did Grandpré found any daughter houses. Some restoration work took place in the 15th and 16th centuries. In 1740 the abbey was plundered by Dutch troops. At the end of the 18th century, the farm buildings were rebuilt.

In 1796, the abbey was suppressed and sold as national property to Jean-Baptiste Paulée, a financier from Paris and Douai. The conventual buildings had been demolished by 1807.

In 1992 and 1997, the façade and roof of the mill and a subterranean channel were declared protected monuments, as had happened to the gatehouse in 1956.

== Present day ==
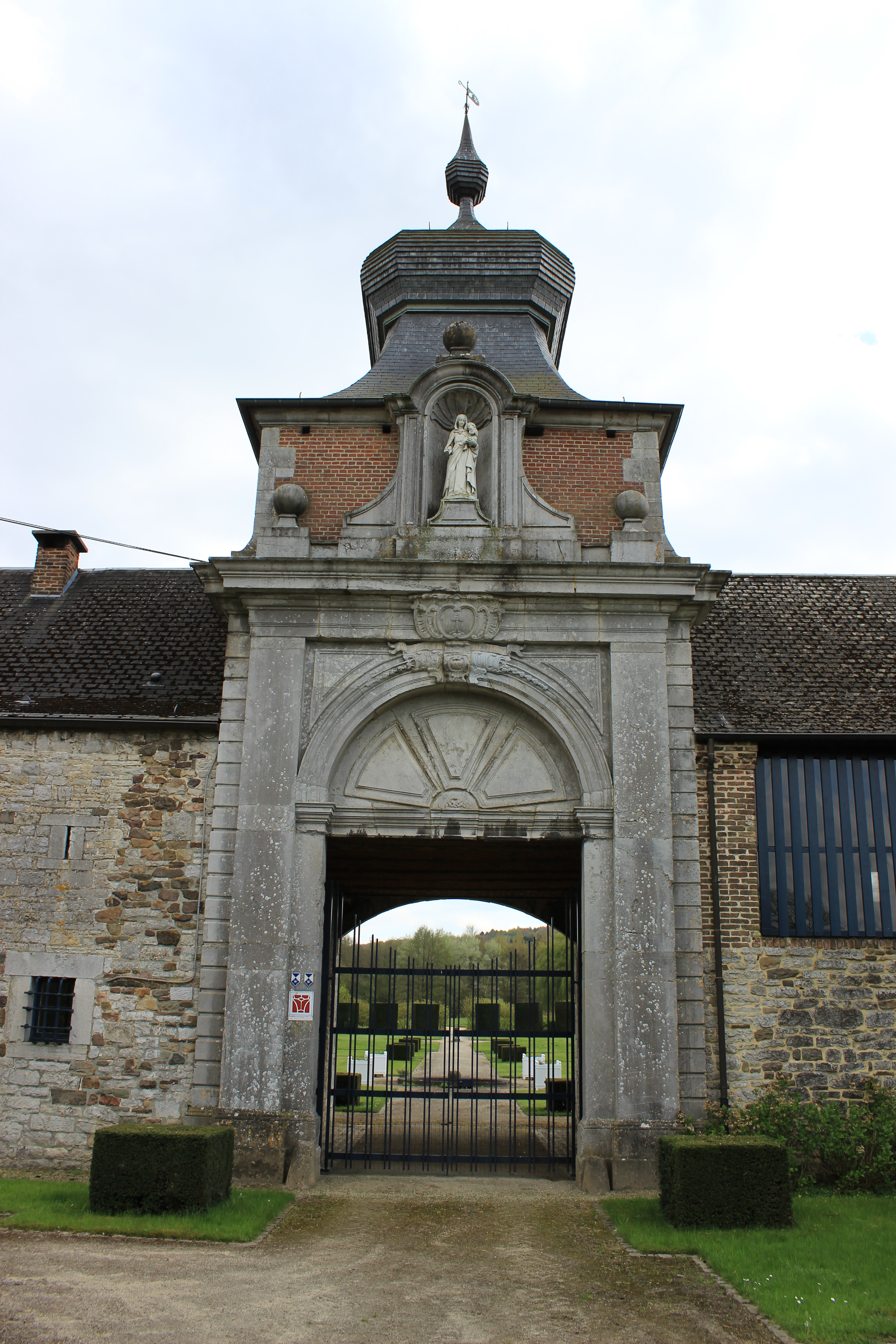
Abbey gatehouse

The remaining buildings, which are Baroque and Rococo in style, have been restored and are privately maintained. The abbey is now in private ownership and the buildings are not open to the public, but the gardens are accessible on demand, for a minimal contribution to the proprietor for his or her charitable purposes.

== Architectural heritage ==
Of the extensive abbey buildings burnt and looted in the French Revolution there remains only the extraordinary gatehouse restored in 1771 under Abbot Étienne Defrenne and registered in 1956 by the Commission royale des monuments et des sites.

== Bibliography ==
- Blouard, R., 1954: Abbaye de Grandpré. Namur
- Peugniez, Bernard, 2002: Routier cistercien (2nd edn), pp. 486–487. Moisenay: Editions Gaud ISBN 2-84080-044-6
