= Oliver Röpke =

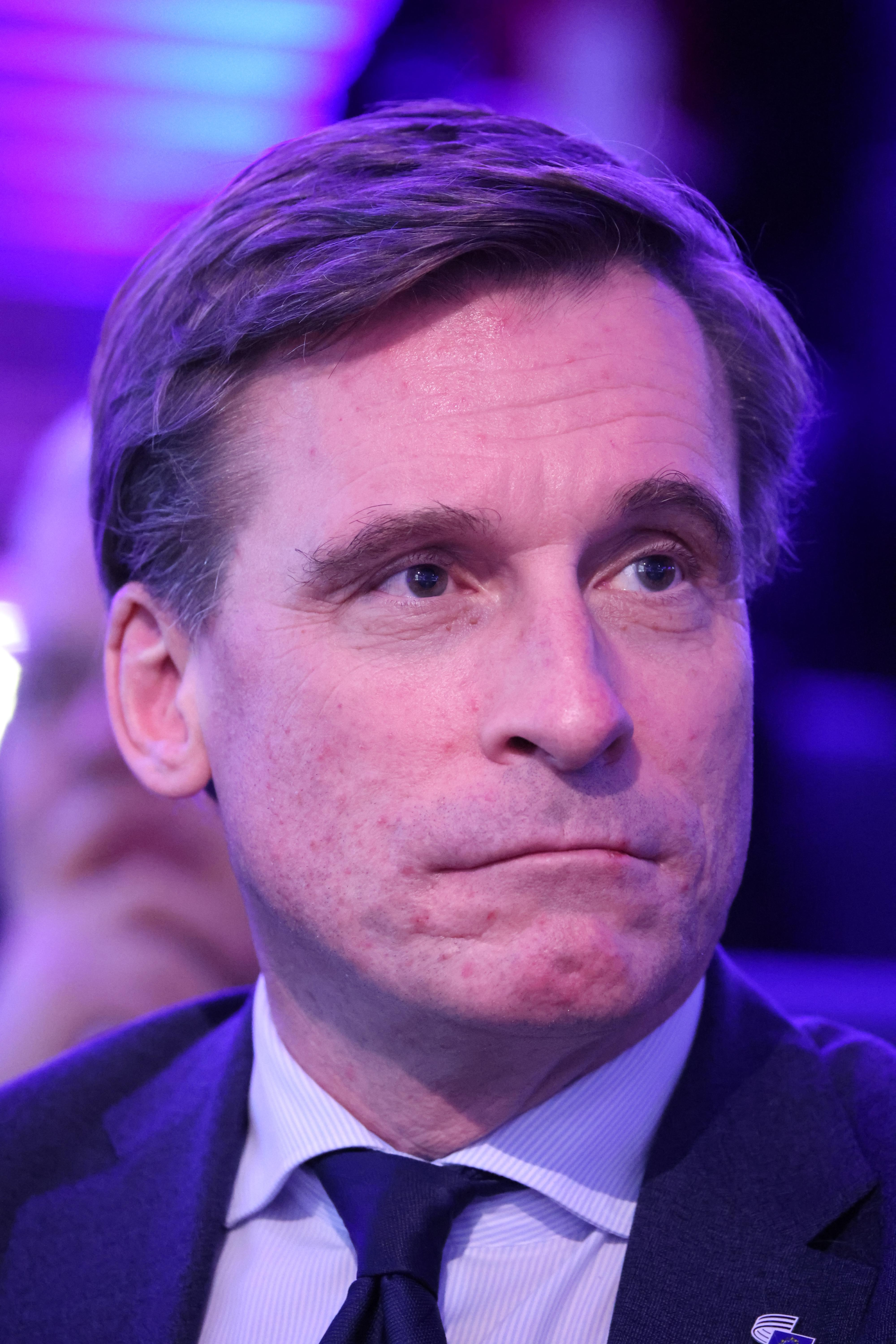
- Oliver Röpke in 2024

34th President of the European Economic and Social Committee
- In office 26 April 2023 – 22 October 2025
- Preceded by: Christa Schweng
- Succeeded by: Séamus Boland

Personal details
- Born: 9 January 1971 (age 55) Hamburg, Germany
- Party: Social Democratic Party of Austria
- Education: University of Vienna

Oliver Röpke (Austrian German: [ˈɔlivɐ ˈrœpkɛ]; born 9 January 1971) is an Austrian trade unionist. Member of the Austrian Trade Union Federation (ÖGB), he served as President of the European Economic and Social Committee (EESC) from April 2023 until october 2025.

Röpke was appointed as member of the EESC in September 2009, and elected President of the Workers' Group in March 2019.

== Biography ==
After completing his studies in law, he started working for the Chamber of Labour and as head of the legal department at the ÖGB-affiliated Trade Union for Hotel, Hospitality and personal services (HGPD). In 2001 Röpke started working for the European Union office of the Austrian Trade Union Federation (ÖGB), and became Head of office in 2008. He took on several senior positions, including as ÖGB representative to the EU institutions, the executive committee to the ETUC, and an advisory member of the ÖGB federal executive board.

In 2009, he was appointed as member of the European Economic and Social Committee (EESC): during his mandates, he focused mainly on employment and social policies.

In April 2023, the EESC elected Röpke as its president for a two and a half year term. During his presidency, the EESC became the first Institution of the European Union to involve representatives from candidates to accession to the EU in its advisory work and to systematically introduce the EU Youth Test.
