= Faulx-les-Tombes =

Faulx-les-Tombes Få-les-Tombes (Walloon)
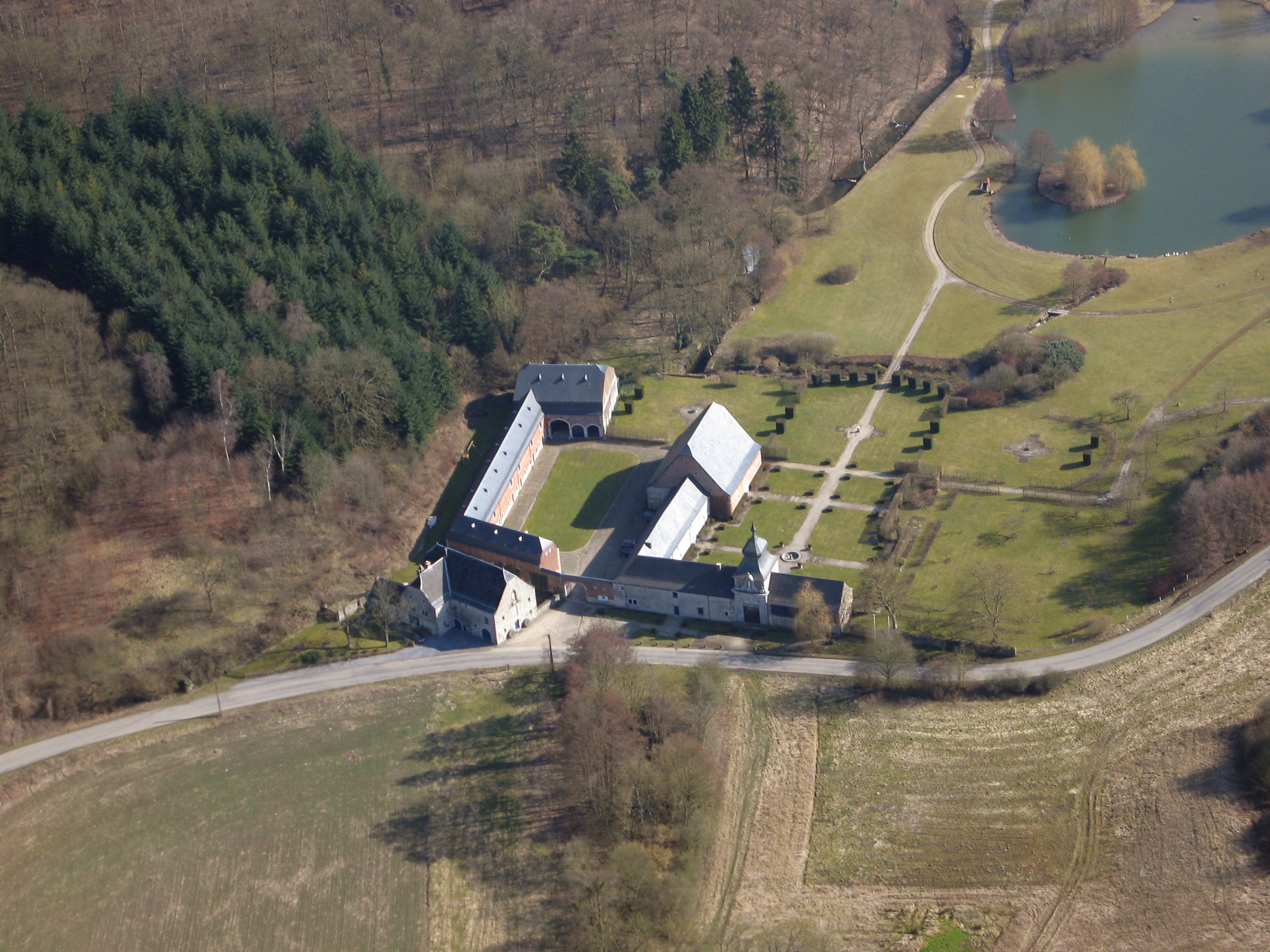
- Grandpré Abbey in Faulx-les-Tombes

- Location within Belgium Location within Europe
- Coordinates: 50°25′37″N 05°01′08″E
- Country: Belgium
- Region: Wallonia
- Province: Namur
- Municipality: Gesves

Faulx-les-Tombes (Walloon: Få-les-Tombes) is a village of Wallonia and a district of the municipality of Gesves, located in the province of Namur, Belgium.

Remains of Roman settlements have been discovered in the area, which was settled already during the Paleolithic. After the foundation of the Grandpré Abbey, the village became a dependency on the abbey until the French Revolution. In more recent history, 141 men from the village were deported to Germany in 1916, during World War I and the Rape of Belgium.

The village church dates from 1874 and was designed by Hendrik Beyaert in a Romanesque revival style. The Grandpré Abbey, which dates from the Middle Ages, is also located in Faulx-les-Tombes. The Faulx-les-Tombes Castle, as well as the privately owned Château d'Arville (built 1616, rebuilt during the 19th century) are also in or in the vicinity of the village.
