= European Economic and Social Committee =

Institution of the European Union

(in other official languages)
Bulgarian	Европейски икономически и социален комитет
Czech	Evropský hospodářský a sociální výbor
Danish	Det Europæiske Økonomiske og Sociale Udvalg
German	Europäischer Wirtschafts- und Sozialausschuss
Greek	Ευρωπαϊκή Οικονομική και Κοινωνική Επιτροπή
English	European Economic and Social Committee
Spanish	Comité Económico y Social Europeo
Estonian	Euroopa Majandus- ja Sotsiaalkomitee
Finnish	Euroopan talous- ja sosiaalikomitea
French	Comité économique et social européen
Irish	Coiste Eacnamaíoch agus Sóisialta na hEorpa
Croatian	Europski gospodarski i socijalni odbor
Hungarian	Európai Gazdasági és Szociális Bizottság
Italian	Comitato economico e sociale europeo
Lithuanian	Europos ekonomikos ir socialinių reikalų komitetas
Latvian	Eiropas Ekonomikas un sociālo lietu komiteja
Maltese	Il-Kumitat Ekonomiku u Soċjali Ewropew
Dutch	Europees Economisch en Sociaal Comité
Polish	Europejski Komitet Ekonomiczno-Społeczny
Portuguese	Comité Económico e Social Europeu
Romanian	Comitetul Economic și Social European
Slovak	Európsky hospodársky a sociálny výbor
Slovene	Evropski ekonomsko-socialni odbor
Swedish	Europeiska ekonomiska och sociala kommittén
- European Economic and Social Committee logo

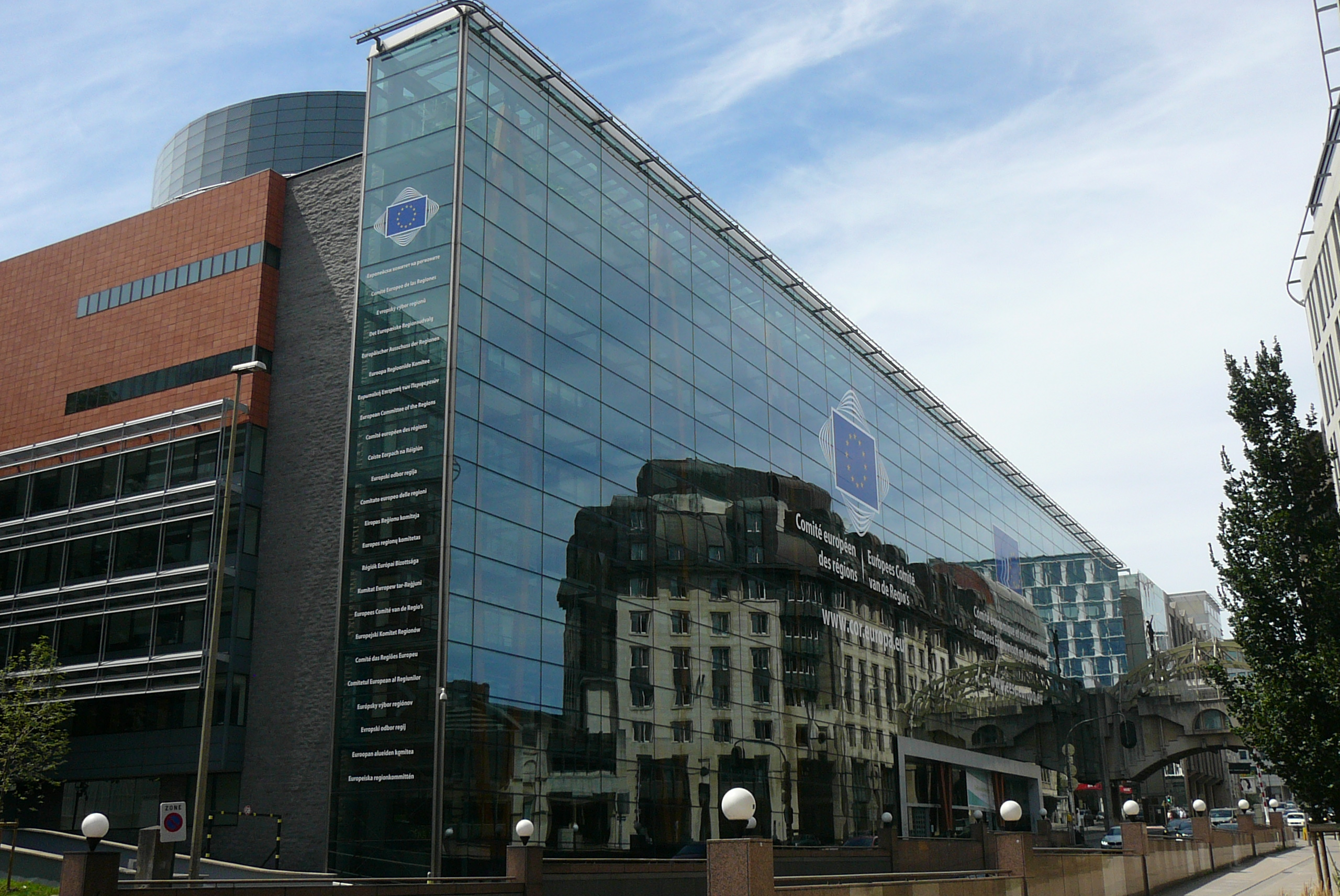
- Jacques Delors building, which houses the EESC and the European Committee of the Regions
- Abbreviation: EESC
- Formation: 1958; 68 years ago
- Type: Advisory body to the European Union
- Purpose: Represent employers, employees and civil society organisations
- Headquarters: Jacques Delors building, Belliard 99, B-1040 Brussels Belgium
- Coordinates: 50.8405°N 4.3772°E
- Members: 329
- Secretary General: Isabelle Le Galo Flores
- President: (Republic of Ireland) Séamus Boland
- Website: eesc.europa.eu

The European Economic and Social Committee (EESC) is a consultative body of the European Union (EU) established in 1958. It is an advisory assembly composed of representatives from employers' associations, workers' unions (trade unions) and civil society organisations. Its seat, which it shares with the Committee of the Regions, is the Jacques Delors building on Belliardstraat / Rue Belliard 99 in Brussels.

Once known by the acronym "EcoSoc", the body is now referred to as the "EESC", to avoid confusions with the United Nations ECOSOC.

== Role ==
The European Economic and Social Committee was established by the Treaty of Rome of 1957 in order to unite different economic interest groups to establish a Single Market. The creation of this committee gave them an institution to allow their voices to be heard by the European Commission, the Council and the European Parliament. The EESC declares itself to be "a bridge between Europe and organised civil society".

It is mandatory for the committee to be consulted on those issues stipulated in the Treaties and in all cases where the institutions deem it appropriate. The Treaty of Maastricht considerably enlarged the committee's domain. Its influence now extends to matters such as social policy, social and economic cohesion, environment, education, health, customers protection, industry, Trans-European Networks, indirect taxation and structural funds. On certain issues the EESC works in partnership with the Committee of the Regions.

In latest years, the committee has taken up the challenge of civil society, opening up its forum to representatives of all sectors, developing two complementary missions:

- Involving civil society organisations more in the European venture, at both national and European level,
- Boosting the role of civil society organisations in non-member countries or country groupings where the committee is furthering structured dialogue with civil society organisations, and promoting the creation of consultative structures based on its experiences, not least in the countries applying for EU membership, the Mediterranean partner countries, African, Caribbean and Pacific countries, India, China, Latin America (Mercosur) and Brazil.

== Operation ==
It is mandatory for the committee to be consulted on those issues stipulated in the Treaties and in all cases where the institutions deem it appropriate. The EESC may also be consulted on an exploratory basis by one of the other institutions, and under Rule 29(2) of its Rules of Procedure may issue opinions on its own initiative. Around 15% of its opinions are own-initiative opinions.

Own-initiative and exploratory opinions often raise the awareness of decision-making bodies, and of the commission in particular, about subjects which have hitherto barely attracted their attention, if at all. Exploratory opinions drawn up at the request of other institutions before the commission has even drafted its proposals enable the various components of organised civil society represented within the EESC to express the expectations, concerns and needs of grassroots stakeholders.

The Committee adopts on average 170 opinions a year on a wide range of subjects concerning European integration. It therefore plays an active role in the processes of shaping Community policies and preparing Community decisions.

== Membership ==
Currently, EESC membership numbers 329 (same as the Committee of the Regions). The number of members per EU state varies according to the population of each state (see table below for state-by-state membership figures; the breakdown is the same for the Committee of the Regions). Members of the EESC are divided into three groups of equal number, employers, employees and civil society organisations.

Members are appointed by the Council (by qualified majority) following nominations made by the government of the respective Member State. However, once appointed, the members are completely independent of their governments. They have a renewable term of office of five years. The President of the EESC is elected for a 2 1/2-year term.

State	Members	State	Members	State	Members
Germany	24	Belgium	12	Ireland	9
Hungary	12	Croatia	9	France	24
Portugal	12	Lithuania	9	Italy	24
Sweden	12	Latvia	7	Spain	21
Bulgaria	12	Slovenia	7	Poland	21
Austria	12	Estonia	7	Romania	15
Slovakia	9	Cyprus	6	Netherlands	12
Denmark	9	Luxembourg	6	Greece	12
Finland	9	Malta	5	Czech Republic	12
Total					329

EESC Presidents
(Germany) Göke Frerichs (2000—2002)
(France) Roger Briesch (2002—2004)
(Austria) Anne-Marie Sigmund (2004—2006)
(Greece) Dimitris Dimitriadis (2006—2008)
(Italy) Mario Sepi (2008—2010)
(Sweden) Staffan Nilsson (2010—2013)
(France) Henri Malosse (2013—2015)
(Greece) George Dassis (2015—2018)
(Italy) Luca Jahier (2018—2020)
(Austria) Christa Schweng (2020—2023)
(Austria) Oliver Röpke (2023—2025)
(Republic of Ireland) Séamus Boland (2025— )

== Opinions ==
Selected own-initiative opinions include:

- Opinion on the Value and supply chain development in a European and global context (adopted 25 April 2007) which argued that EU and member state agencies should work to improve the environment in which "initial and intermediate companies" operate within supply chains. Initialised as "IICs", a term which was "coined specifically for this opinion", the opinion refers to the relatively less visible, generally smaller or medium sized enterprises, at the lower tiers of supply chains, operating at early stages of the value creation process, often in innovative ways, and playing an important role in employment. The opinion notes that there is "no established definition of IICs" and that attitudes to such companies vary across member states and regions.
- Towards an ILO standard against gender-based violence at work (16 September 2015)

== Critiques ==
In a report reviewing 50 years of the EESC, C.S. Dimitrioulas cited Jacques Delors as saying that EESC contributions from 1958 to 2008 on civil and social matters were "remarkable". Dimitrioulas commented: "Thanks to its membership and unique role in the EU’s institutional framework, the Committee will in future have special responsibility for making a reality of participatory democracy and for working towards the development of structured dialogue between organised civil society and Union institutions."

The Lisbon Treaty has confirmed the EESC's role and influence. According to proponents of the EESC: "Indeed, significant prospects for the development of participatory democracy are opened through Article 11 of the new Treaty on the European Union, which lays the foundations for the future establishment of a genuine structured civil dialogue at European level alongside the political dialogue between the EU and its Member States and the social dialogue with the social partners, thereby ensuring sustainable participation of organised civil society in the European political process. In this context, the EESC has a particular responsibility in bringing participatory democracy to life. In view of its membership and role, as laid down in the Treaties, and in partnership with the other institutions, the Committee's purpose is to be even more in the future the means of developing participatory democracy and civil dialogue at Union level."

In October 2020 reappointment of a Polish business representative Jacek Krawczyk for another five-year term as a member of the EESC became a target of harsh criticism as the EESC faced pressure to better prevent harassment in the organization. Mr. Krawczyk was himself accused of psychological harassment and is prosecuted by Belgian authorities. Besides that, the conduct of Jacek Krawczyk has been investigated by the EU’s anti-fraud office OLAF. MEPs therefore rejected the EESC’s 2018 financial accounts over its failure to deal with the issue of harassment. According to the words of MEP Tomáš Zdechovský, who led the budget discharge procedure, the EESC was not able to answer questions regarding its various mistakes and take measures which would make MEPs believe that this particular institution is able to protect the interests of European citizens.

Overall usefulness of the EESC has also been questioned recently. While the number of administrative staff has decreased from 727 in 2013 to 668 in 2019 and the number of opinions has gone down, the annual EESC's budget has continued to grow. Czech MEP Tomáš Zdechovský said, that “very few lawmakers are reading the opinions of this committee. The impact is close to zero.” He also described the EESC as “a zombie committee that lost its purpose but still lives on.”

== See also ==
- BUSINESSEUROPE
- European Centre of Enterprises with Public Participation and of Enterprises of General Economic Interest
- European Trade Union Confederation
- UEAPME
- United Nations Economic and Social Council
