= European Committee of the Regions =

Institution of the European Union

- European Committee of the Regions logo

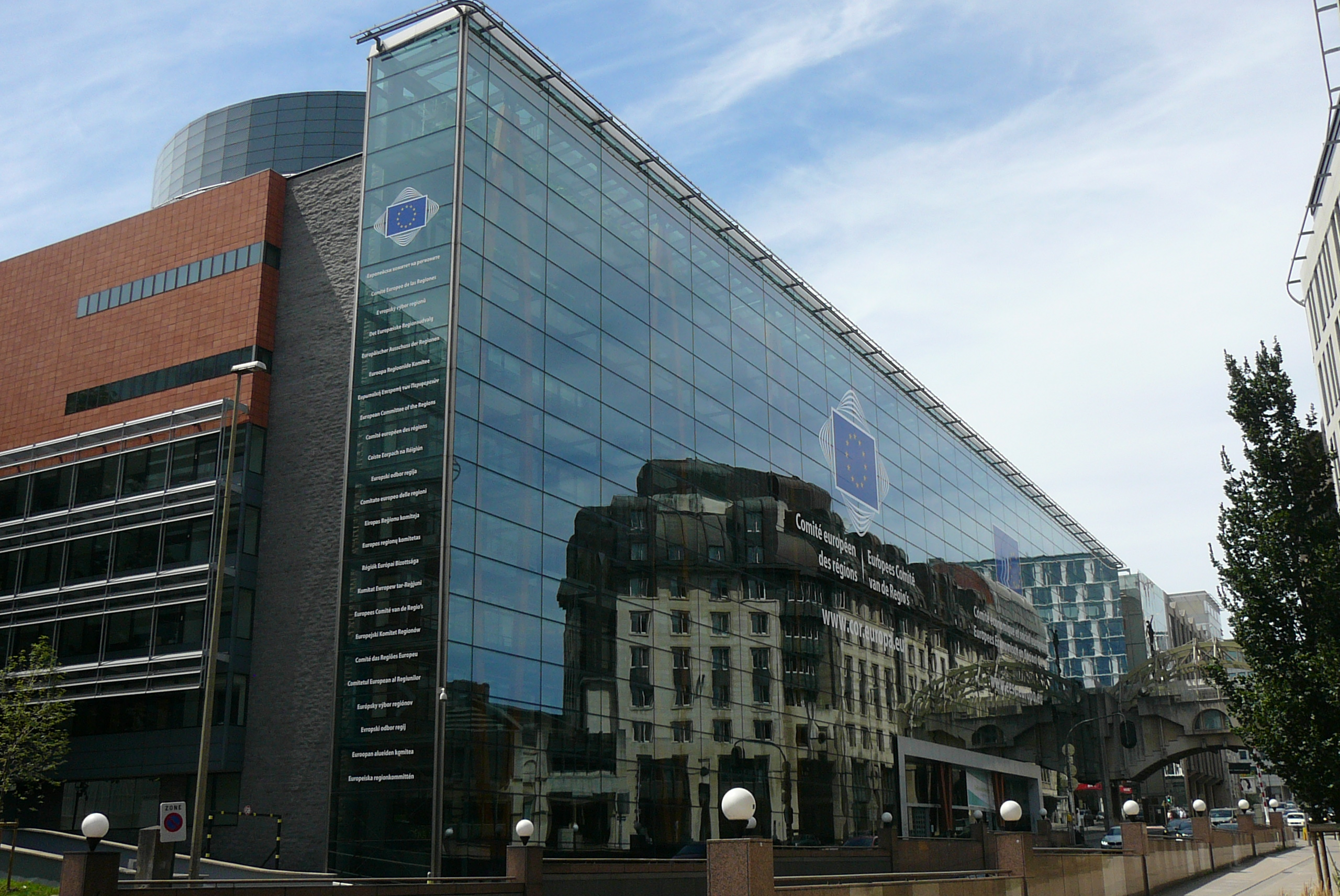
- Jacques Delors building, which houses the CoR and the European Economic and Social Committee
- Abbreviation: CoR
- Formation: 1994; 32 years ago
- Type: Advisory body to the European Union
- Purpose: Consultative to the EU institutions; subsidiarity monitoring – can approach the Court of Justice of the European Union with regard to the application of subsidiarity principle
- Headquarters: Jacques Delors building, Brussels, Belgium
- Coordinates: 50°50′26″N 4°22′38″E
- Members: 329
- President: Kata Tüttő, PSE
- First Vice President: Juanma Moreno, EPP
- Website: www.cor.europa.eu

The European Committee of the Regions (CoR) is the European Union's (EU) assembly of local and regional representatives which provides sub-national authorities (i.e. regions, counties, provinces, municipalities and cities) with a direct voice within the EU's institutional framework.

Established in 1994, the CoR was set up to address two main issues. First, about three quarters of EU legislation is implemented at local or regional level, so local and regional representatives needed to have a say in the development of new EU laws. Second, there were concerns about a widening gap between the public and the process of European integration; involving the elected level of government closest to the citizens was one way of closing the gap.

== History ==
Within the European Union, local and regional authorities have lobbied for an increased say in EU affairs. This resulted in the creation of the European Committee of the Regions by the Maastricht Treaty, and the provision for Member States to be represented in the Council of the EU by ministers from their regional governments.

== Principles ==
There are three main principles at the heart of the committee's work:

Subsidiarity
This principle, enshrined into the Treaties at the same time as the creation of the CoR, means that decisions within the European Union should be taken at the closest practical level to the citizen. The European Union, therefore, should not take on tasks which are better suited to national, regional or local administrations.
Proximity
All levels of government should aim to be 'close to the citizens', in particular by organising their work in a transparent fashion, so people know who is in charge of what and how to make their views heard.
Partnership
Sound European governance means European, national, regional and local government working together – all four are indispensable and should be involved throughout a "multi-level governance" decision-making process.

== Scope ==
The Treaties oblige the European Commission and the Council of the European Union to consult the Committee of the Regions whenever new proposals are made in areas that have repercussions at regional or local level. Outside these areas, the commission, Council and European Parliament have the option to consult the CoR on issues if they see important regional or local implications to a proposal. The CoR can also draw up an opinion on its own initiative, which enables it to put issues on the EU agenda.

The CoR has gained the right (semi-privileged status) to approach the European Court of Justice now that the Treaty of Lisbon has entered into force following ratification by all EU Member States (Article 8, Protocol (No. 2) on the Application of the Principles of Subsidiarity and Proportionality).

== Composition ==
The CoR has 329 full members and the same number of alternate members. The number from each EU country reflects the size of its population, but ranges from a representation of an average of 88,087 citizens of Malta per seat to 3.45 million citizens per German seat. Its members are locally and regionally elected representatives including mayors, regional presidents and councillors. The numbers per country are as follows:

State	Members	State	Members	State	Members
Germany	24	Belgium	12	Ireland	9
Hungary	12	Croatia	9	France	24
Portugal	12	Lithuania	9	Italy	24
Sweden	12	Latvia	7	Spain	21
Bulgaria	12	Slovenia	7	Poland	21
Austria	12	Estonia	7	Romania	15
Slovakia	9	Cyprus	6	Netherlands	12
Denmark	9	Luxembourg	6	Greece	12
Finland	9	Malta	5	Czech Republic	12
Total					329

== Internal structure ==
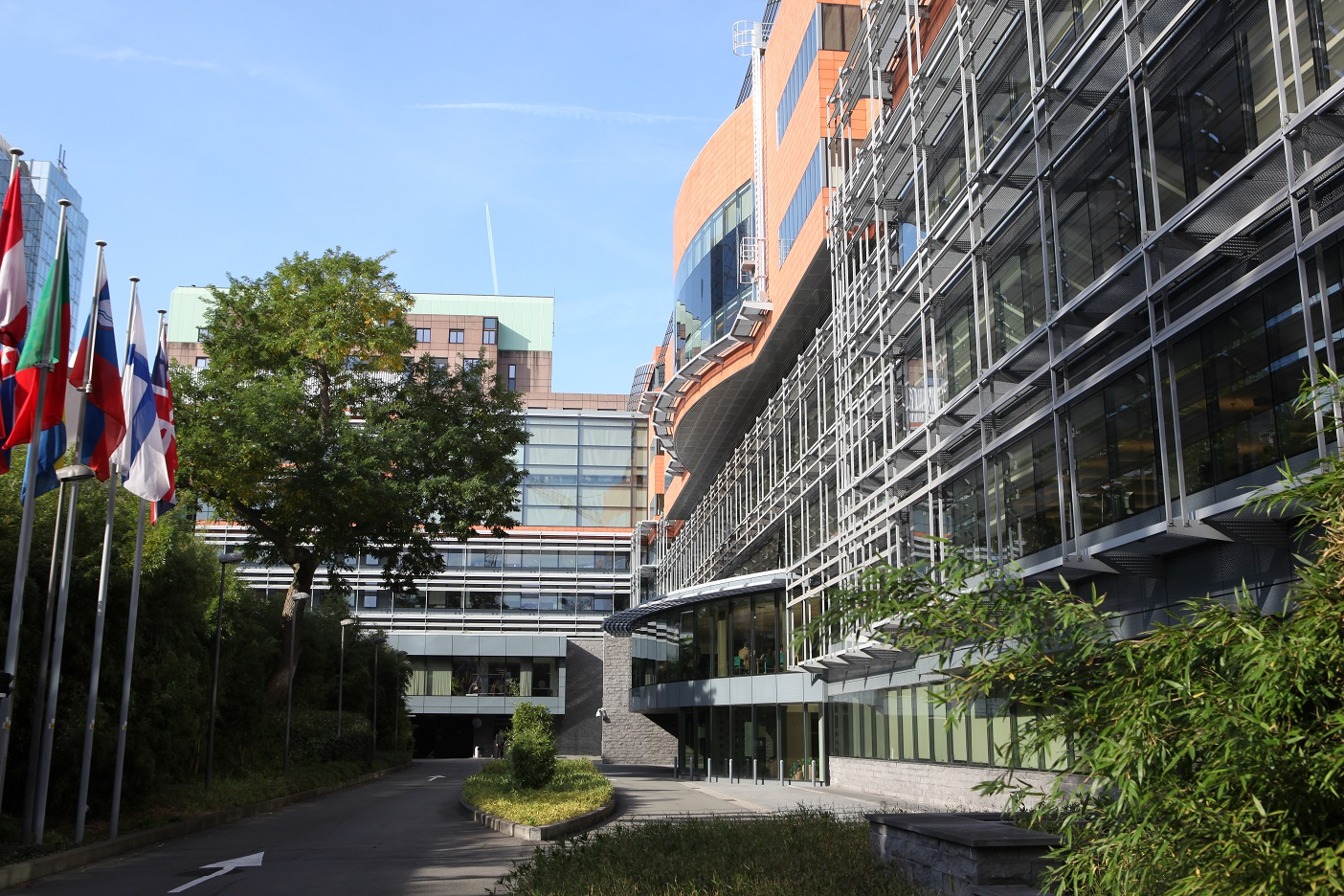
CoR's Jacques Delors Building in Brussels

=== President ===
Elected for a two-and-a-half-year term at the plenary assembly, the President guides the committee's work, chairs plenary sessions and is the CoR's official representative.

==== List of presidents ====
CoR President	Presidency	Nationality	European political group
Kata Tüttő, Budapest	2025–present	Hungary	Party of European Socialists
Vasco Cordeiro, Azores	2022–2025	Portugal	Party of European Socialists
Apostolos Tzitzikostas, Central Macedonia	2020–2022	Greece	European People's Party
Karl-Heinz Lambertz, German-speaking Community of Belgium	2017–2020	Belgium	Party of European Socialists
Markku Markkula, Espoo	2015–2017	Finland	European People's Party
Michel Lebrun, Wallonia	2014–2015	Belgium	European People's Party
Ramón Luis Valcárcel, Región de Murcia	2012–2014	Spain	European People's Party
Mercedes Bresso, Piedmont	2010–2012	Italy	Party of European Socialists
Luc Van den Brande, Flanders	2008–2010	Belgium	European People's Party
Michel Delebarre, Dunkirk, Nord-Pas-de-Calais	2006–2008	France	Party of European Socialists
Peter Straub, Baden-Württemberg	2004–2006	Germany	European People's Party
Sir Albert Bore, Birmingham	2002–2004	United Kingdom	Party of European Socialists
Jos Chabert, Brussels-Capital Region	2000–2002	Belgium	European People's Party
Manfred Dammeyer, North Rhine-Westphalia	1998–2000	Germany	Party of European Socialists
Pasqual Maragall, Barcelona, Catalonia	1996–1998	Spain	Party of European Socialists
Jacques Blanc, Languedoc-Roussillon	1994–1996	France	European People's Party

=== First Vice-President ===
The First Vice-president is also elected by the plenary assembly for two-and-a-half years and represents the president in the latter's absence. Juanma Moreno (Spain / European People's Party, EPP), President of the Regional Government of Andalusia, was elected First Vice-president of the European Committee of the Regions on 19 February 2025.

=== Bureau ===
The Bureau is the executive body of the CoR. It comprises 61 members: the president, the First Vice-president, the presidents of the six political groups, one vice-president per member state (27), and 26 other members from the national delegations, enabling it to reflect national and political balances. The Bureau generally meets seven or eight times a year to draw up the CoR policy programme and instructs the administration on the implementation of its decisions.

=== Plenary assembly ===
The members of the CoR meet in plenary session in Brussels six times a year, to discuss and adopt opinions, reports and resolutions.

=== CoR commissions ===
The CoR structures its work by means of six thematic commissions, which specialise in topical areas:

- CIVEX: citizenship, governance, institutional and external affairs
- COTER: territorial cohesion policy;
- ECON: economic policy;
- ENVE: environment, climate change and energy;
- NAT: natural resources and agriculture;
- SEDEC: social policy, employment, education, culture and research.

They prepare draft opinions and hold conferences and seminars focused on their areas of competence. Each commission has approximately 100 members (each member can be part of two commissions) and is supported by a secretariat within the administration. A special Commission for Financial and Administrative Affairs (CFAA) is also established to assist the CoR Bureau.

=== Political groups ===
The CoR has six political groups: the Progressive Alliance of Socialists and Democrats (PES), the European People's Party (EPP), Renew Europe (RE), the European Alliance (EA), the European Conservatives and Reformists Group (ECR Group) and The Greens (GRE). The members of each political group meet before major meetings to adopt common positions, membership of the plenary body is as follows, with 15 seats currently vacant:

Group	Seats
European People's Party (EPP)	116 / 329
Progressive Alliance of Socialists and Democrats (PES)	79 / 329
Renew Europe (RE)	50 / 329
European Conservatives and Reformists (ECR)	27 / 329
European Alliance (EA)	13 / 329
The Greens (GRE)	11 / 329
Members not belonging to any group	11 / 329

=== Conference of Presidents ===
The CoR president, first vice-president, presidents of the political groups and the secretary general gather within a Conference of Presidents before each plenary session and other important meetings, with the aim of reaching a political consensus on strategic questions.

=== National delegations ===
The CoR also comprises 27 national delegations. Members meet in their national delegations before plenary sessions and other events to discuss common positions.

=== Secretary-General ===
The Secretary-General is appointed for five years by the Bureau. As head of the CoR administration, the Secretary-General must not hold a political mandate. He is responsible for implementing President's and Bureau decisions and the smooth running of the CoR administration. Petr Blížkovský is the CoRs' Secretary-General since 16 December 2019.

==== Secretariat-General ====
The Secretariat-General consists of five directorates: Members and Plenaries; Legislative Work 1; Legislative Work 2; Communication; Human Resources and Finance. The Logistics and Translations Directorates are jointly managed with the European Economic and Social Committee. The total number of CoR staff in 2015 was 527.

=== Budget ===
The CoR's 2013 budget (€36.5M) represents 0.06% of the total EU budget which makes it the third smallest EU institution in terms of budgetary needs. Its 2014 budget (€90.2M) breakdown according to purpose of expenditure is as follows: 39.7% – Consultative Works (€35.8M); 30.3% – Translation, Interpretation and Print (€27.2M); 30% – Administration and Functioning (€27M). The CoR's 2015 budget was €89.2M. Although all CoR expenditure formally falls under Heading 5 (Administrative expenditure) of the EU Budget, as is the case for the European Parliament budget, a substantial part of its budget relates to non-administrative expenditure. Most obvious examples are all CoR expenses related to its Members and their political activities.

== Work ==
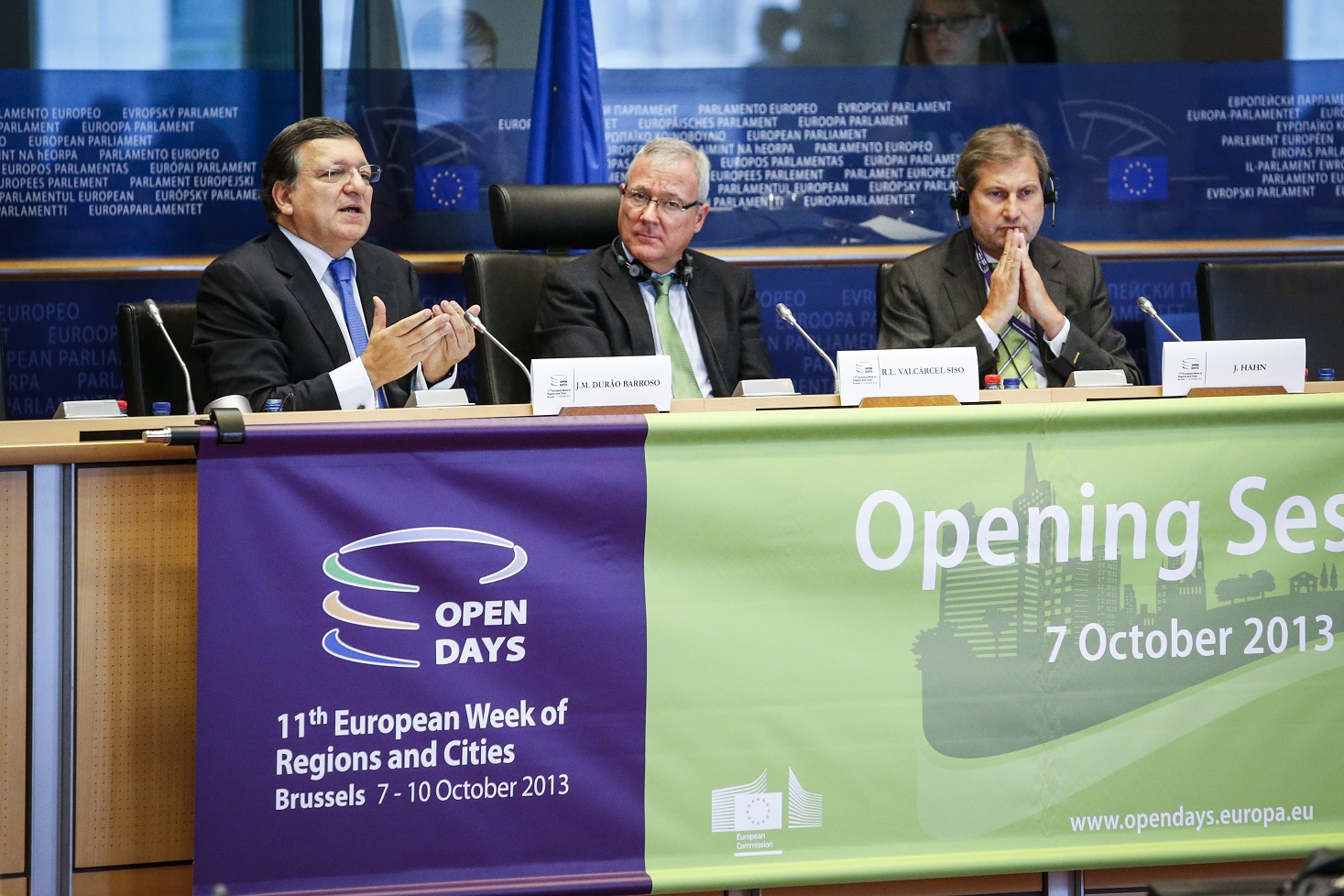
OPEN DAYS 2013. Former President of the CoR Ramón Luis Valcárcel and the EU Commissioner responsible for Regional Policy Johannes Hahn are listening to the opening speech of the EC President José Manuel Barroso

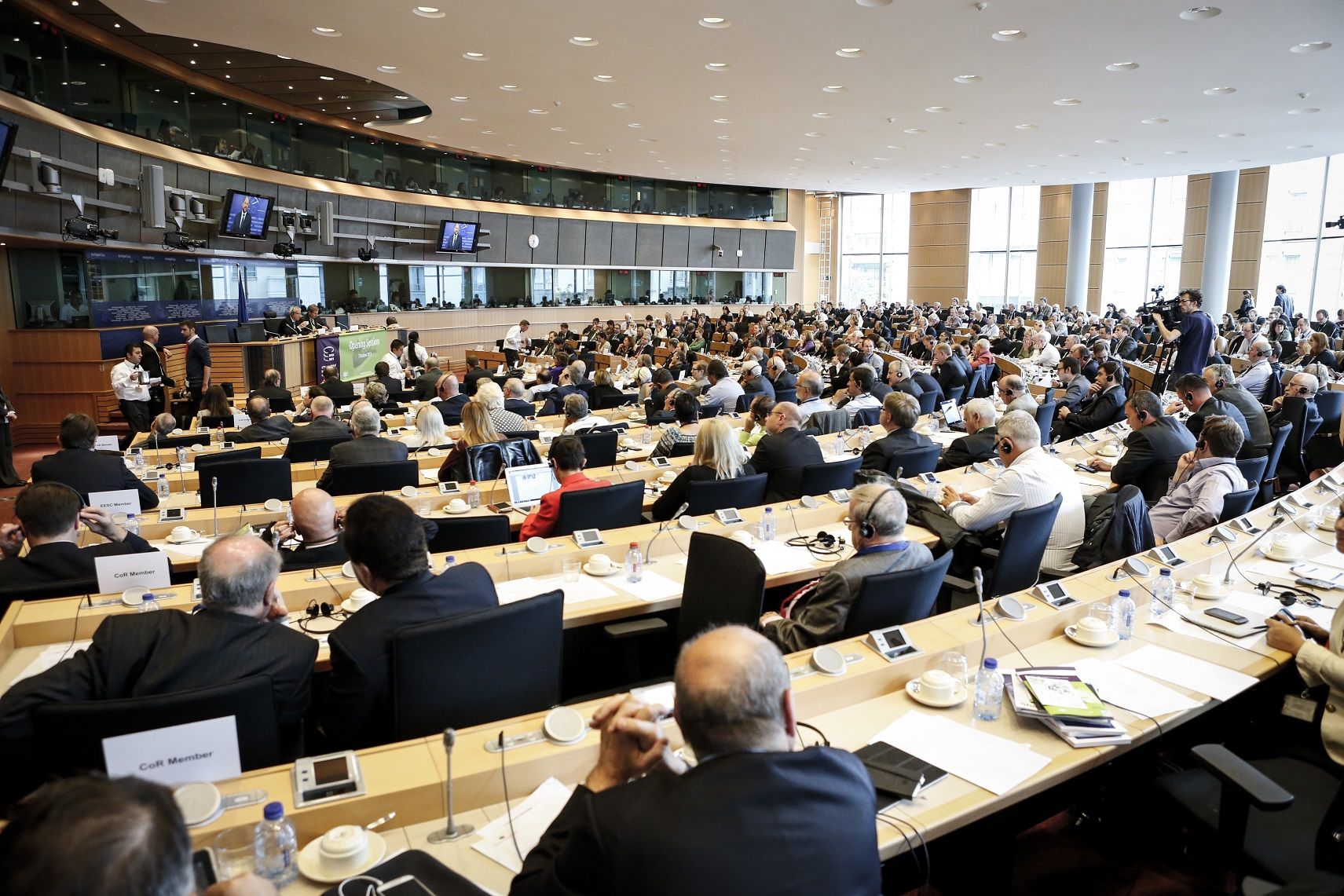
Opening session of the OPEN DAYS 2013

=== Opinions ===
The European Commission, Council of Ministers and European Parliament consult the CoR when drawing up legislative texts (directives, regulations, etc.) on areas affecting local and regional authorities. The draft texts are forwarded to the relevant CoR commission. A rapporteur is then appointed to draw up the committee's opinion. This draft opinion must be adopted by the CoR commission before being discussed at the plenary session. Once it has been approved in plenary, the official opinion is sent to all the European institutions and published in the Official Journal of the European Union.

=== Resolutions ===
Resolutions enable the committee to express its view on important and topical issues. The CoR's political groups or 32 CoR members can draw up resolutions.

=== Studies and other publications ===
The CoR produces studies on various aspects of the local and regional dimension of the EU (education, transport, social issues, enlargement, etc.). They are drawn up with the help of outside experts. The CoR also produces publications for both the general public and for regional and local players, aimed at explaining its activities and outlining current political developments.

=== Events ===
As a meeting place for regions and cities, the CoR organises conferences, seminars and exhibitions in cooperation with local and regional partners and other EU institutions. Once a year, during the European Week of Regions and Cities, the CoR welcomes to its headquarters thousands of participants who take part in lively discussions or seek partners to collaborate on joint projects.

== Key dates ==
1992 – Maastricht Treaty
EU leaders decide to set up the Committee of the Regions (CoR) as a consultative assembly which will provide regions and cities with a voice in the EU decision-making process and act as a direct link between Brussels and the citizens. The Treaty makes it mandatory for the European Commission and the Council of Ministers to consult the CoR on key areas of regional concern. CoR members are to be nominated by the governments of Member States and will serve for four years. In March 1994 the CoR holds its first plenary session in Brussels.
1995 – EU enlargement
The CoR's membership increases from 189 to 222, following the accession of Austria, Finland and Sweden.
1997 – Amsterdam Treaty
Extends the CoR's remit to cover around two thirds of the EU's legislative proposals. The Treaty also makes it possible for the Committee to be consulted by the European Parliament.
2001 – Nice Treaty
Underlines the democratic legitimacy of the CoR by requiring that its members are elected or politically accountable to an elected regional or local assembly. Caps the number of members at 350.
2002–03 – Convention on the Future of the EU
CoR members take part in the convention responsible for drafting an EU constitution. The text expressly recognises the role and powers of local and regional government; it also gives the CoR the right to go to the Court of Justice of the European Communities to challenge EU laws which do not comply with the principle of subsidiarity.
May 2004 – EU enlargement
Number of CoR members increases from 222 to 317, following the accession of 10 new Member States.
February 2006 – New term of office
The CoR starts a new four-year term. Its political priorities include boosting the role of local and regional authorities in line with the Lisbon Strategy for Jobs and Growth, strengthening cohesion and solidarity, and spearheading the 'Communicating Europe – Going local' campaign to bring the EU closer to its citizens.
January 2007 – EU enlargement
With the accession of Bulgaria and Romania, the number of CoR members rises from 317 to 344.
December 2007 – Lisbon Treaty
The Lisbon Treaty confirms the CoR's right to appeal to the Court of Justice of the European Communities to safeguard its prerogatives and the subsidiarity principle – a right already recognised by the Convention on the Future of the EU. This new entitlement will strengthen the CoR's political role, by enabling it to act more effectively on the EU stage for the benefit of regional and local authorities. The Lisbon Treaty extends the term of office of CoR members from four to five years.

July 2013 – EU enlargement

Number of CoR Members increases from 344 to 353, following the accession of Croatia (CoR members later decreased to 350).

Early 2020 – Brexit and Greens

Following Brexit (31 January), the number of CoR Members decreased to 329 due to the removal of the 24 members from the United Kingdom. As of February, a new Political Group was represented in the CoR, The Greens.

== Criticism ==
In 2020, the Committee of the Regions was criticized for its 20-year-old unresolved case of Robert McCoy, a former internal auditor, who has been severely harassed after he blew the whistle on "fraud and embezzlement" at the EU body. In his speech before the European Parliament, McCoy claimed the CoR had run "a vindictive campaign" against him and "denigrated" his personal and professional reputation. That issue made the Committee receive criticism also from the Dutch MEP Sophie in 't Veld, who used to work for the Committee of the Regions. She told Parliament that from her experience, the administration at the CoR had been "totally incompetent and rotten to the core". She also accused the CoR of being stuck in "full denial mode" and suggested potential budgetary sanctions. One of the leading critics of the Committee of the Regions' inaction on this issue was also the Czech MEP Tomáš Zdechovský: "When I look at this case, it reminds me of the American film 'Groundhog Day' where the protagonist becomes trapped in a time loop".

In April 2026, the European Court of Auditors published Special Report 12/2026 examining the performance of both the CoR and the EESC. The audit found that the CoR delivered only 33% of its mandatory referral opinions within the institutional deadlines set by the European Parliament, Council and Commission between 2019 and 2024, though 74% were delivered before the relevant European Parliament committee vote. The report also identified gaps in the CoR's procedures for selecting external experts, noting the absence of transparent selection criteria or a central expert register, which it flagged as a reputational risk. On impact measurement, the auditors found that while the CoR has produced annual impact reports since 2015, these remain largely output-focused: tracking the number of opinions and media mentions rather than systematically assessing whether its recommendations are reflected in final EU legislation. The ECA recommended that the CoR introduce key performance indicators on timeliness, develop automated deadline tracking, establish transparent expert selection criteria, and implement outcome-based performance measurement by December 2027.

== See also ==
- Institutions of the European Union
- Congress of the Council of Europe
- Conference of European Regions with Legislative Power
