= Dufaux =

Dufaux may refer to:

== People ==
- Dufaux (surname)

== Other uses ==
- Dufaux automobile, Swiss race car manufacturer, 1904 - 1907.
- Dufaux, the Japanese name of Dufort, a character in Zatch Bell!
- Dufaux triplane (Dufaux 3), an experimental aircraft constructed by Henri and Armand Dufaux
- Dufaux 4, a biplane constructed by Henri and Armand Dufaux
- Dufaux 5, a biplane constructed by Henri and Armand Dufaux

== See also ==
- Faux (surname)
