= Defaux (surname) =

List of surnames

Origin
- Origin: Ultimately from Old French fou, fau, "beech" from Latin fagus; or from Germanic falisa, "cliff"
- Region of origin: Belgium, France

Other names
- Cognates: De Fauw, Faux, Dufaux, Defau

Defaux is a surname popular in Belgium and northeastern France.

Like its cognates/variants De Fauw and Faux, it could derive from fou, fau (Old French for "beech"); be a toponymic surname indicating origin from a place called Faux or Faulx (possibly Faulx-les-Tombes in Wallonia, Belgium; Faux, Court-Saint-Étienne, Belgium; Wavrechain-sous-Faulx in the Nord department; a commune in Pas-de-Calais, or one in the Ardennes) or derive from the adjective "faux" (Middle French: "faulx").

The etymology of the place names in Belgium is ultimately from Latin fagus ("beech") via Old French fou, fau, or from Germanic *falisa, "cliff".

Notable people with the name include:

- Alexandre Defaux (1826–1900), French artist
- Gérard Defaux (1937–2004), French American writer
- Joseph Defaux (1861–1931), Belgian representative and mayor

== See also ==
- Faux (surname)
- de Fauw (surname)
