= De Fauw (surname) =

List of Surnames

- Language: Flemish

Origin
- Origin: From Old French fou, fau, "beech" from Latin fagus; or from Germanic falisa, "cliff"
- Region of origin: Belgium

Other names
- Variant forms: Defauw, De fauw, de Fauw, Defauwe, Defauwes, Defawe, Defawes, Defau, Defaut
- Cognates: Faux, Defaux, Dufaux, Defaut, Defau
- See also: De Pauw

Not to be confounded with De Pauw.

De Fauw or Defauw is a Belgian surname.

The name has many variants. It derives from Old French fou, fau, "beech", itself from Latin fagus, or, like the variants Defau and Defaut, it can indicate origin from Faux (Faulx) in Court-Saint-Étienne, Wallonia, or Faulx-les-Tombes, near Namur, also in Wallonia, or from Les Fawes, Liège. The etymology of these toponyms is either still from Latin fagus via Old French, or from Germanic *falisa, "cliff".

Notable people with the surname include:

- Brad DeFauw, American professional ice hockey winger
- Davy De fauw, Belgian footballer
- Désiré Defauw, Belgian conductor and violinist
- Dimitri De Fauw, Belgian cyclist
- Dirk De fauw, Belgian politician
- Ken De Fauw, Belgian cyclist
- Rita Defauw, Belgian rower
