= Émile Taddéoli =

Emile Taddéoli
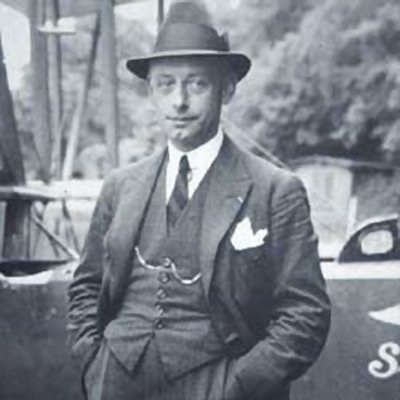
- Emile Taddéoli in 1920
- Born: 8 March 1879; Geneva, Switzerland
- Died: 24 May 1920 (aged 41); Romanshorn, Switzerland
- Occupations: Pilot, instructor, test pilot
- Known for: Pilot's brevet number 2 issued in Switzerland on 10 October 1910; Most prominent pioneer using seaplanes in Switzerland

Pierre Émile Taddéoli (8 March 1879 in Geneva – 24 May 1920 in Romanshorn) was a Swiss aviation pioneer. He was active as a pilot, instructor, test pilot, and also the probably most prominent pioneer using seaplanes in Switzerland. Taddéoli received the pilot's brevet number 2 issued in Switzerland on 10 October 1910.

== Years of the flight pioneers ==
Emile Taddéoli's passion for engines and mechanics started at a very young age. After some success as cyclist on vélodrome in Varambé (GE) in 1893/94, motorcyclist (he designed a prototype), mechanic and car driver from 1895 to 1909, he was attracted by the aviation that became very popular in Switzerland in 1908/9. Inspired by Alberto Santos-Dumont and Louis Blériot, in March 1909 Taddéoli left Switzerland for Mourmelon (France) to learn how to fly at the Ecole d’aviation Blériot. On 22 March 1910 Taddéoli started his first flight over 1,500 metres (4,900 ft) in his newly bought Blériot XI. Despite his relatively low experience, he participated, beginning in April 1910, at several flight meetings in Italy, France and Portugal, and proposed by Armand Dufaux, he overflew Paris on 18 July 1910. Back in Geneva, he started flying around Switzerland, got several prizes (flight over 161 minutes and others) in his Blériot number 8, succeeding again in the first overflight of the canton of Geneva on 7 September 1910.

== Flight meetings and flight records ==
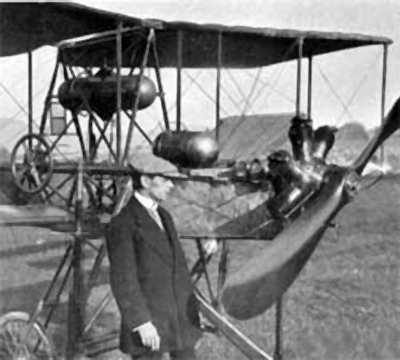
Emile Taddéoli and his Dufaux 4, 1910

In his newly acquired Dufaux 4 biplane, from September to October 1910, Taddéoli became the instruction pilot for Armand Dufaux and Henri Dufaux. During the flight meeting in Luzern in September 1910, Emil Taddéoli collided with a line of trees just before landing; he left the wreck of his airplane unhurt; another pilot, Hans Schmid, fatally crashed. This tragic accident started a crisis when the Swiss newspapers denounced what they called an unuseful aerial circus.

At the flight meeting in Brig, he tried to overfly the Alps for the first time. On a meeting in Bern with six pilots, Taddéoli succeeded in a flight over 58 minutes at an altitude of 600 metres (2,000 ft). On 10 October 1910 Emile Taddéoli received the Swiss pilot's licence number 2; number 1 was issued to Ernest Failloubaz.

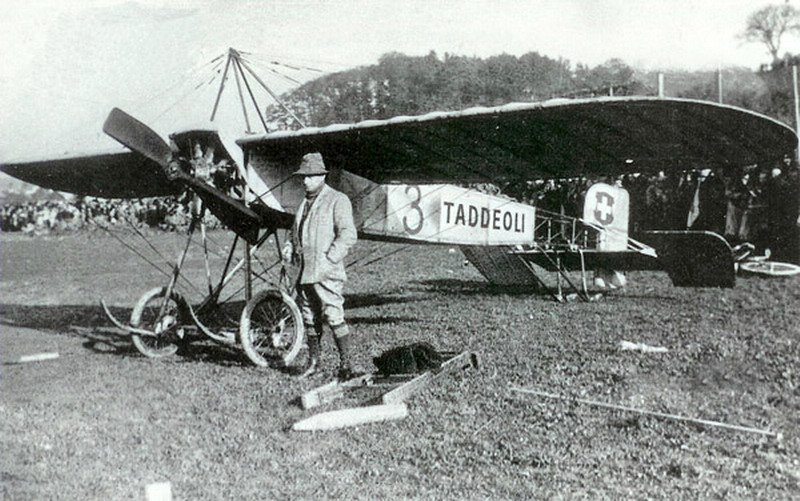
Emile Taddéoli and his Morane monoplane

On 10 October 1910 Taddéoli won a generous prize at the flight meeting in Bern after having reached an altitude of 350 metres (1,150 ft); this prize and the returns of several demonstration flights – 120 kilometres per hour (75 mph) in November 1910, Viry-Lausanne-Blécherette in 60 minutes (80 kilometres (50 mi)) on 31 May 1911, overflying Carouge and Geneva at an altitude of 400 metres (1,300 ft), the Swiss record in a flight over 125 kilometres (78 mi) – allowed him to buy, in April of the following year, a Morane-Borel monoplane, succeeding in flight meetings among them in Lausanne, Annecy (France), Viry, Lugano, Avenches, Geneva (altitude of 900 metres (3,000 ft)), Bern, Planeyse, Dübendorf etc.

== Seaplanes and later years ==
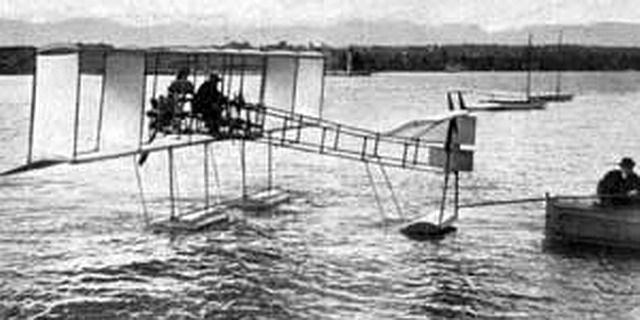
La Mouette seaplane on Lake Geneva in March 1912

In June 1911, in co-operation with Edouard Perrot (Edouard Perrot & Cie), Taddéoli started to design the seaplane "La Mouette", making preparatory experiments using a Dufaux 4 biplane equipped with floats. On 24/25 June 1911, during a flight meeting in Annecy, he crashed his Dufaux 5 on Lake Geneva. On 26 March 1912 a first takeoff attempt was not successful, and "La Mouette" was destroyed. While taking off to fly from Bern to Biel/Bienne on 3 June 1913, Taddéoli lost a wheel, but the good fortune was again with him. Oskar Bider witnessed the incident and took off with the wheel to catch Taddéoli up, to warn him of the danger: Taddéoli landed without problems in Bienne. During the following years, Taddéoli took part in 45 flight meetings within 53 months, and achieved more rewards and records. An application to join the military aviation troops was rejected because he was married.

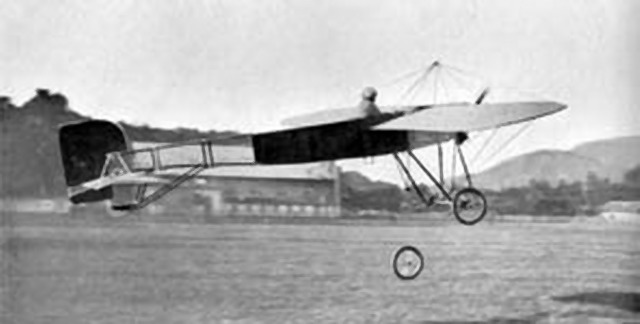
The incident in Bern-Beundenfeld on 3 June 1913

For a while he earned his living flying passengers, later Taddéoli left Switzerland for Sesto Calende in Italy on the southern tip of Lago Maggiore where he was hired as test pilot for Savoia in mid-1914. This manufacturer of hydroplanes was the leader in Europe, and the SIAI S.13 seaplane was a bestselling aircraft. During these five years of activity, Taddéoli made more than 2,700 flight tests, flying about 150,000 kilometres (93,000 mi).

In January 1919, Emile Taddéoli was pioneering again in crossing the Apennine Mountains in a seaplane between Sesto Calende and San Remo. On 12 July 1919, with a passenger on board, he flew from Calende on Lago Maggiore to Lake Geneva in 110 minutes, overflying the Mont Blanc (4,695 metres (15,404 ft)) massif in his Savoia S-13.

In July 1919 he became director and chief pilot for Avion Tourisme SA; on 12 October 1919, Taddéoli started as chief pilot on seaplanes for the later Ad Astra Aero S.A. On 7 April 1920, he was pioneering again in crossing the Alps from Lugano to Geneva in 85 minutes with a passenger (Eric Debétaz) on board.

== Death ==
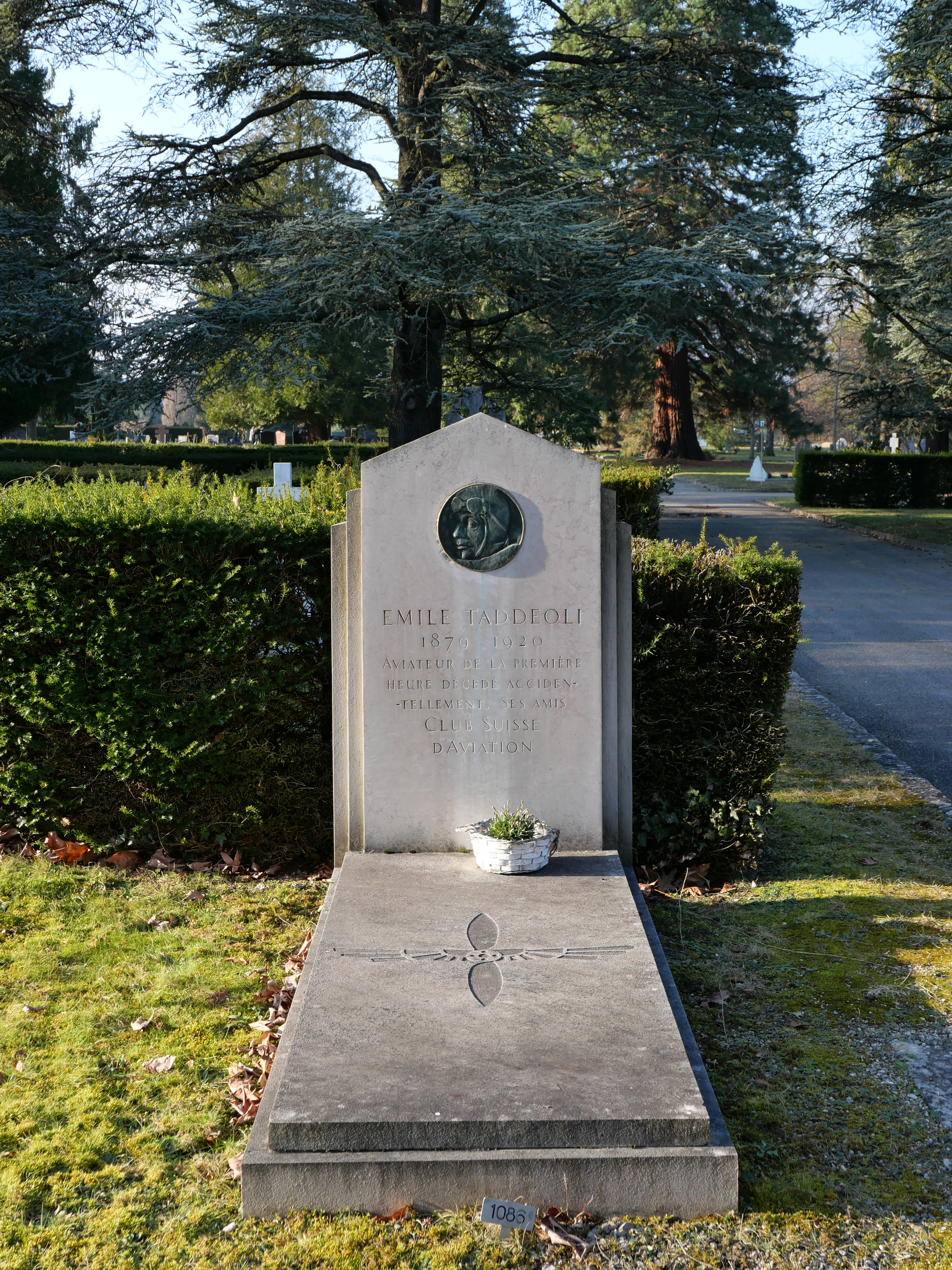
Taddeoli's grave

Emile died on 24 May 1920 when a SIAI S.13 in which he was making a demonstration flight at an air show in Romanshorn disintegrated at an altitude of 700 metres (2,300 ft). His 23-year-old mechanic, Y. Giovanelli, was also killed.

== Honor ==
Emile Taddéoli was honored by the then king of Italy for his merits as Chevalier de l'ordre royal d'Italie. A monument on his grave in Geneva was inaugurated in 1932, and a train was named after Emile Taddéoli.

== Gallery ==
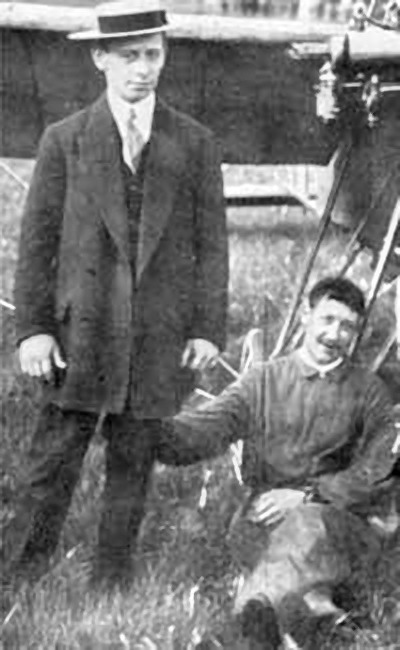
Emile Taddéoli and René Grandjean at a flight meeting in Zug, August 1912

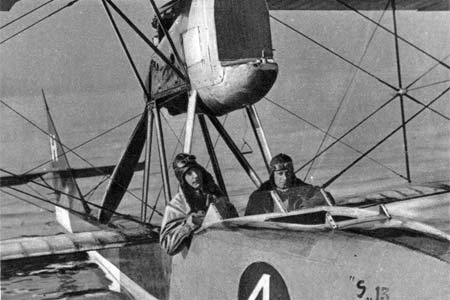
Maurice Duval and Emile Taddéoli in a Savoia S-13 (CH-4) on Lake Geneva

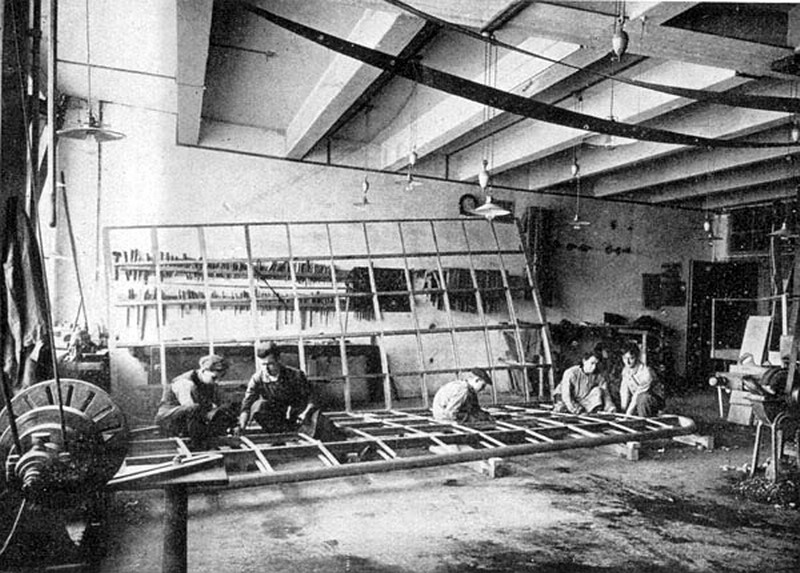
"La Mouette" seaplane construction

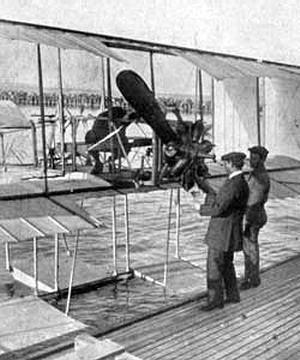
"La Mouette" seaplane on Lake Geneva in March 1912
