= Dufaux 5 =

General information
- Type: Military aircraft
- Manufacturer: Henri Dufaux
- Designer: Henri Dufaux

History
- First flight: 1910

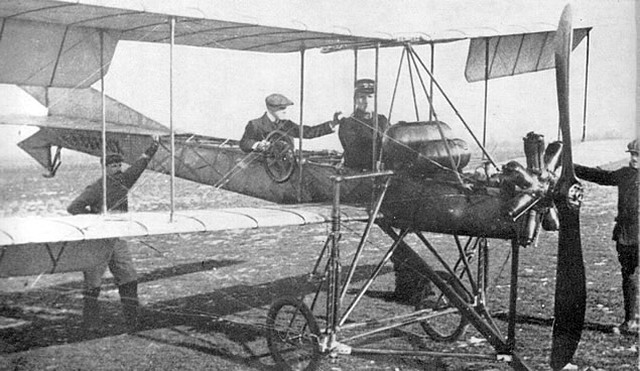
Ernest Failloubaz (pilot) and Gustave Lecoultre (observer) demonstrating the Dufaux 5 to the Swiss Army from September 4 to 6, 1911

The Dufaux 5 was a two-seat airplane built in 1910–11 by French-Swiss aviation pioneers Henri and Armand Dufaux.

== Construction and development ==
After Armand Dufaux had flown over Lake Geneva for its entire length with the Dufaux 4 on 28 August 1910, and the world record by Louis Blériot was significantly exceeded, Armand and his brother Henri produced the first aircraft in Switzerland. In the months after the record flight of 28 August 1910, the Dufaux brothers undertook numerous other flights and participated with other flight pioneers - including Emile Taddéoli (1879–1920), flying boat Pioneer who was, until his death, chief pilot of Ad Astra Aero.

The record-breaking Dufaux 4 provided space for only the pilot but the Dufaux 5 was designed by the Dufaux brothers as a two-seater. The Dufaux 5 was designed based on the experience of Dufaux 4 and the remaining nameless model 2 with eight wings. The basic design of the Dufaux 4 was substantially expanded by one seat for a passenger and the Anzani aircraft engine was replaced by the 91-kilogram Gnome 70 seven-cylinder rotary engine supplying 53 kW (70 hp). Otherwise, the aircraft differed little from similar structures from the pioneering years of aviation. The supporting structure of Dufaux 4 appeared as the same total length, wing span and unchanged height, while the performance was increased despite the increased launch weight. The previous two ailerons between the wings were increased to four, arranged on the rear of the wings as in today's designs.

== Use ==
The biplane was manufactured from December 1910, in the company Mégevet, Corsier (where the Dufaux brothers had completed their initial flight tests). The total number of manufactured aircraft should be at least 15 units (including Dufaux 4) but this needs to be clarified.

The Swiss army had already rejected using the Dufaux 4 in May 1910, since they saw them as inappropriate for military use. The now much improved Dufaux 5 led Ernest Failloubaz (1892–1919), the youngest pilot in Switzerland (who was 19 years of age at that time), to fly it. From 4 to 6 September 1911, before the Army leadership as observers in the maneuvers of the 1st Army Corps reconnaissance missions, he flew with his friend Gustave Lecoultre. There was a crash landing on the last day of the three-day operation of these flights to begin the Swiss military aviation.

Dufaux was used from October 1911 at the Flight School founded by Emile Taddéoli in Viry, near Geneva. Ernest Failloubaz may have been the first owner of a Dufaux 5. He had ordered Dufaux 5 from the flight school in Avenches in November 1910, with which he had already conducted a test flight in the presence of Armand Dufaux, followed by an unknown number of passenger flights in the first half of January 1911. Armand Dufaux increased the production to 16 by 18 April at the air show at Viry, where he showed the airplane to interested observers. A flight demonstration by Emile Taddéoli in Annecy crashed in Geneva, without any harm to humans and machines, and the flight demonstrations continued till July 1911. Presumably, from this point, the Aircraft Production had been discontinued by the brothers Dufaux, but three Dufaux aircraft were produced in Avenches, probably in the autumn of 1911.

Notable owners of Dufaux 5 are Armand Dufaux, Emile Taddéoli, Ernest Failloubaz, François Durafour (1888–1967), Cobioni and Beck. Charles Girod, Georges Cailler, Gustave Lecoultre, Hollinger, Beck and Knutti received flying lessons in the flight school of their chief pilot Durafour at Avenches in the course of 1911. The model was used in the School of Failloubaz probably at least until 1916.

== Technical data ==
| Performance indicator | Dufaux 5 | Dufaux 4 |
| Length | 9.5 m | 9.5 m |
| Height | 2.7 m | 2.7 m |
| Wingspan | 8.5 m | 8.5 m |
| Wing area | 24,0 m² | 24,0 m² |
| max. Start Weight | 555 kg | 320 kg |
| Curb weight | 340 kg | 180 kg |
| Crew | pilot and passenger | Pilot |
| Drive | Gnome rotary engine with 53 kW (70 hp) | Anzani engine with 19 kW (25 hp) |
| Start Speed | | 42 km/h |
| Speed | 84 km/h (52 mph) | 60 km/h |
| Rate of climb | 0.3 m/s | |
| Ceiling | 600 m | 500 m |
| Wing loading | 23 kg/m | |
| Scope | 60 km (37 mi) (1 hour flight) | ~ 66 km (41 mi) (32-minute flight) |

== Variants and whereabouts ==
As an alternative to the Gnome rotary engines, Oerlikon four-cylinder aircraft engines were also used. The Dufaux 4, as the oldest surviving Swiss aircraft is in the collection of the Swiss Transport Museum.
