= Faux =

Faux may refer to:

== People ==
- Faux (surname)

== Places ==
=== Places in Belgium ===
- Faux, a village in the Belgian commune of Court-Saint-Étienne

=== Places in France ===
- Faux, Ardennes, French commune of the Ardennes department
- Faux-en-Périgord, French commune of the Dordogne department
- Faux-Fresnay, French commune of Marne department
- Faux-la-Montagne, French commune of the Creuse department
- Faux-Mazuras, French commune of the Creuse department
- Faux-Vésigneul, French commune of the Marne department
- Faux-Villecerf, French commune of the Aube department

== Other uses ==
- Faux de Verzy, dwarf beech from the region of Reims, France
- Faux (river), river in the French Ardennes
- Faux (band), an English alternative rock band

== See also ==
- Faulx (disambiguation)
