= Wavrechain =

Wavrechain may refer to two communes in the Nord department in northern France:

- Wavrechain-sous-Denain
- Wavrechain-sous-Faulx
