= René Grandjean =

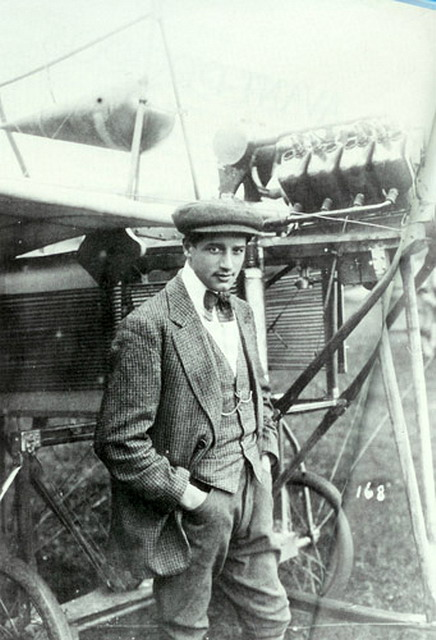
- Grandjean c. 1911
- Born: 12 November 1884; Bellerive, Switzerland
- Died: 14 April 1963 (aged 78); Lausanne, Switzerland
- Occupations: Pilot, inventor and engineer
- Known for: Designed the first aircraft built and flown by Swiss citizen, probably worldwide first glacier pilot, aviation pioneer on seaplanes

René Grandjean (12 November 1884 – 14 April 1963) was a Swiss aviation pioneer. He designed and built the aircraft that was flown by Ernest Failloubaz for the first flight in Switzerland of an aircraft built and flown by Swiss citizen. He was also probably the first glacier pilot and a pioneer on seaplanes.

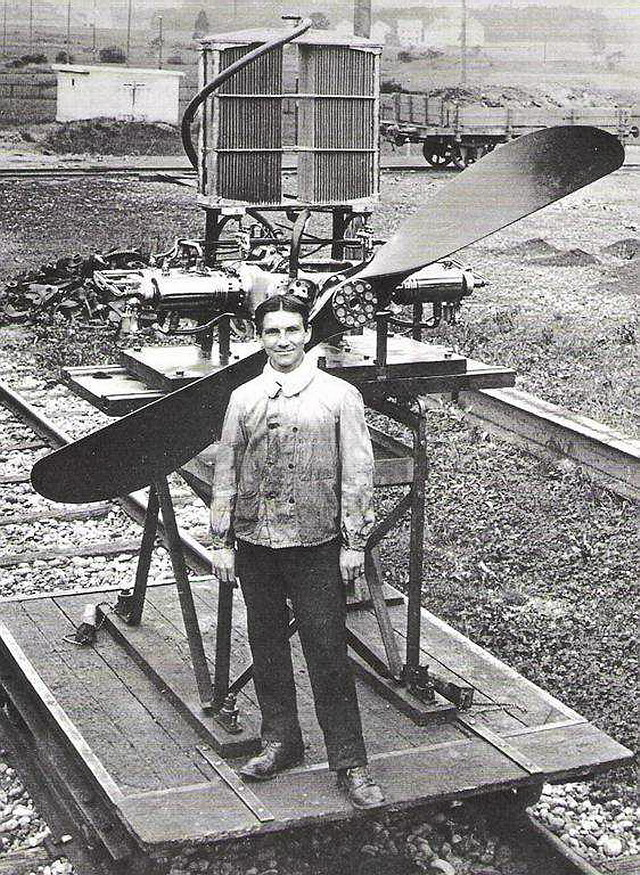
René Grandjean in 1910

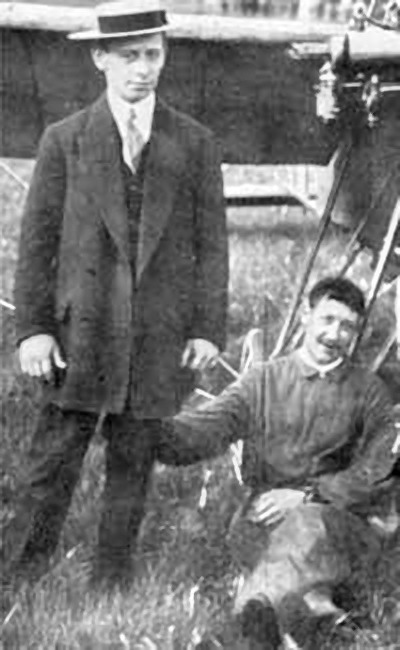
Emile Taddéoli and René Grandjean at a flight meeting in Zug, August 1912

== Life ==
Grandjean was born in Bellerive, Switzerland. In 1890 the family moved to Paris where René did his first studies before returning to Bellerive where his father built a mill and a big saw-mill, aided by the young René, who was fascinated by mechanics. At the age of 18 he moved again to Paris to find a job as a mechanic. Two months later, he was the driver for the marquis de Montebello and later in Egypt for the sultan Omar Bey, who became his friend.

== Beginnings of Swiss Aviation ==
In summer 1909, Grandjean started to realize his longtime dream to build a flying machine; the news of Blériot’s flight across the channel convinced him to leave Egypt and to return to Switzerland. There he met Ernest Failloubaz, 17 years old. Thanks to his inventiveness and craftsman qualities, using only a picture of Blériot’s aircraft, he completed this first aircraft in October 1909. The ground tests started in February 1910 at l’Estivage field in Avenches. What is recognized as of today as being the starting point of the Swiss aviation, happened on 10 May 1910: Failloubaz piloted the machine, resulting in the first flight in Switzerland of an aircraft built and flown by Swiss citizens. René Grandjean succeeded five days after his friend’s first flight but crashed the plane. Immediately repaired, his aircraft was in August 1910 damaged again by Georges Cailler during a flight meeting in Viry, Haute-Savoie.

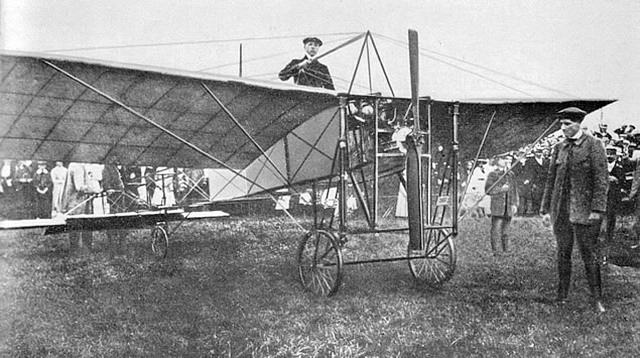
Ernest Failloubaz and René Grandjean at the first Swiss flight meeting in Avenches

On 2 October Failloubaz and Grandjean participated at the first Swiss flight meeting in Avenches, from 8 to 10 October in Bern. On 12 October 1910, Grandjean was prohibited from using l’Estivage airfield; the end of the collaboration between Failloubaz and Grandjean who moved to Dübendorf. In November he made major transformations on his aircraft and during that winter he learned to fly, by himself. In early 1911, Grandjean was hired by Maschinenfabrik Oerlikon to promote their new engine by the manufacturer Farman, Blériot and Voisin.

On 18 June 1911, René Grandjean succeeded in crossing the Lake Neuchâtel, on 18 September he obtained the Swiss pilot's licence number 21 and won the Prix d'aviation de l'Automobile-Club de Suisse on 4 December 1911.

In December 1911 Grandjean was invited at Davos to fly above the resort; he pioneered in building ski to skid on the snow without sinking into it. On 2 February 1912, he carried out the first take off and landing on ski in Switzerland, followed by more than hundred flights within few days without any incident. He was probably the first glacier pilot in the world.

In summer 1912, Grandjean replaced the skis by floats designed and engineered by himself, resulting in the first takeoff of a Swiss hydroplane (seaplane) on 4 August 1912.

At the controls of this seaplane he won several prizes, including the Eynard prize for the invention of a magneto allowing to start the engine from the pilot's seat. Grandjean was one of 12 Swiss pilots called up with their aircraft in late summer 1914 to form the latter Swiss Air Force. Nevertheless, he presented further inventions that did not find support in Switzerland. Grandjean decided to leave for Paris in 1915 where he rapidly became a very demanded technical counsellor, got patents for more than two hundred of his own inventions and returned definitely to Switzerland in 1956. He died in Lausanne.

== Honours ==
On 31 May 1956, Grandjean was invited to inaugurate his own monument in Portalban on Lake Neuchâtel where he landed after his crossing in September 1911. Then he participated with almost all surviving Swiss aviation pioneers at the 50th anniversary of Swiss aviation in November 1960 in Avenches. On 10 May 1965, a monument was erected in Avenches in memory of Ernest Failloubaz, complemented by a commemorative plate reminding his collaboration with Grandjean as the birth of aviation in Switzerland.
