= Faut =

Faut is a surname. Notable people with the surname include:

- Corinne Faut (born 1960), Belgian general
- Ernest Faut (1879–1961), Flemish painter
- Jean Faut (1925–2023), starting pitcher who played from 1946 through 1953
- Volly De Faut (1904–1973), American jazz reed player

== See also ==
- Mthatha Airport (IATA: UTT, ICAO: FAUT)
- Faux (disambiguation)
