= Faulx (disambiguation) =

Faulx is a commune located in the Meurthe-et-Moselle department in north-eastern France.

Faulx may also refer to:

- Faulx-les-Tombes, a village of Wallonia in the province of Namur, Belgium
  - Faulx-les-Tombes Castle, château in the Belgian village
- La Chapelle-du-Bois-des-Faulx, a commune in the Eure department in northern France
- Wavrechain-sous-Faulx, French commune of the Nord department
- French destroyer Faulx, a Bouclier-class destroyer built for the French Navy in 1911

== See also ==
- Folx-les-Caves, village in Wallonia
- Faux (disambiguation)
