= Dufaux triplane =

General information
- Type: Experimental aircraft
- Manufacturer: Armand and Henri Dufaux
- Designer: Armand and Henri Dufaux
- Number built: 1

The so-called Dufaux triplane was an unnamed experimental aircraft built in Switzerland in 1908. It was constructed by the brothers Armand and Henri Dufaux who had previously experimented with a model helicopter. This new aircraft incorporated a feature far ahead of its time; the concept of a tiltrotor. Based on what they had learned from their helicopter, the Dufaux brothers hoped to generate vertical as well as horizontal thrust from their engine installation, and conceived of an aircraft where the engine and propeller would be mounted at the centre of the airframe and would be able to pivot 180° to provide forward, upward, and even backward thrust (the latter to assist in braking). Experiments with a boxkite fitted with an engine in 1905 proved promising, so construction of a full-scale aircraft proceeded.

The resulting machine featured two sets of triplane wings in tandem with the engine installation between them, followed by a biplane tail unit with a span almost equal to that of the wings. There was no fin, but all eight flying surfaces had a marked dihedral, and the fuselage was open framework. A large and heavy aircraft for its day, it immediately posed a problem to the brothers in trying to find a field large enough to test it in, since relying on forward thrust alone, the take-off distance was estimated at 300 metres (1,000 ft). Eventually, they settled on a cavalry training field at Bière, 70 km (43 mi) from their workshop in Geneva. The aircraft was relocated there in July 1909, and tests proceeded through the summer. Problems plagued the trials, and on no occasion did the aircraft appear to come close to leaving the ground. In August, it was badly damaged when it toppled sideways while taxiing, and although repaired, the Dufaux brothers abandoned the project at the end of the month.

== Specifications ==
General characteristics

- Crew: 1 pilot
- Length: 9.00 m (29 ft 6 in)
- Wing area: 60.0 m^{2} (645 sq ft)
- Gross weight: 660 kg (1,450 lb)
- Powerplant: 1 × custom-built 20-cylinder , 90 kW (120 hp)
