= Dufaux (surname) =

Surname

Dufaux is a surname. It is most popular in Belgium, northeastern and southern France, and Switzerland. The etymology is thought to be from Latin fagus ("beech") via Old French fou, fau.

Notable people with the surname include:

- Armand Dufaux (1883–1941), Swiss aviation pioneer
- Frederic Dufaux, French engineer
- Georges Dufaux (1927–2008), Canadian cinematographer
- Gilles Dufaux (b. 1994), Swiss sport shooter
- Guy Dufaux (b. 1943), Canadian cinematographer
- Henri Dufaux (1879–1980), aviation pioneer, brother of Armand
- Irene Dufaux (b. 1960), Swiss sport shooter
- Jean Dufaux (b. 1949), Belgian comic book writer
- Laurent Dufaux (b. 1969), Swiss cyclist
- Louis Dufaux (1931–2011), French Roman Catholic bishop
- Natacha Dufaux, Canadian film editor
- Pierre-Alain Dufaux (b. 1949), Swiss sport shooter

== See also ==
- Faux (surname)
