= Hordain =

- Commune
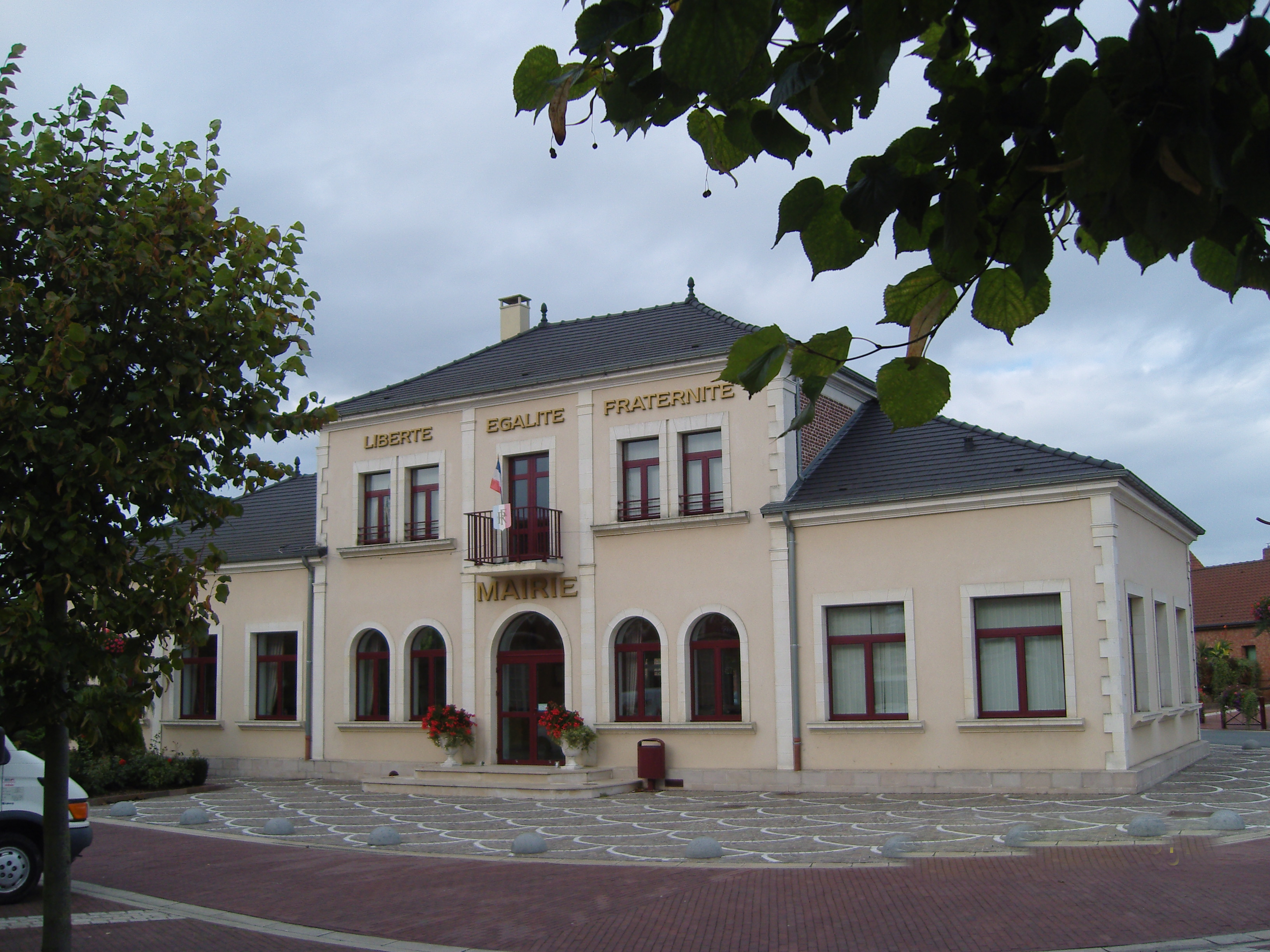
- The town hall in Hordain

- Coat of arms
- Location of Hordain
- Location within France Location within Hauts-de-France
- Coordinates: 50°15′48″N 3°18′57″E
- Country: France
- Region: Hauts-de-France
- Department: Nord
- Arrondissement: Valenciennes
- Canton: Denain
- Intercommunality: CA Porte du Hainaut

Government
  - Mayor (2020–2026): Arnaud Bavay
- Area^{1}: 5.66 km^{2} (2.19 sq mi)
- Elevation: 60 m (200 ft)
- Highest elevation: 65 m (213 ft)
- Lowest elevation: 34 m (112 ft)
- Population (2023): 1,446
  - Density: 255/km^{2} (662/sq mi)
- Time zone: UTC+01:00 (CET)
  - Summer (DST): UTC+02:00 (CEST)
- INSEE/Postal code: 59313 /59111
- ^{1} French Land Register data, which excludes lakes, ponds, glaciers > 1 km^{2} (0.386 sq mi or 247 acres) and river estuaries.

Hordain (French pronunciation: [ɔʁdɛ̃]) is a commune in the Nord department in northern France.

== Heraldry ==
Arms of Hordain	The arms of Hordain are blazoned : Or, a chief argent, overall a lion gules. (The emblazon here is actually Per fess argent and Or, a lion gules., which would make more sense.)

== See also ==
- Communes of the Nord department
