= Avesnes-le-Sec =

- Commune
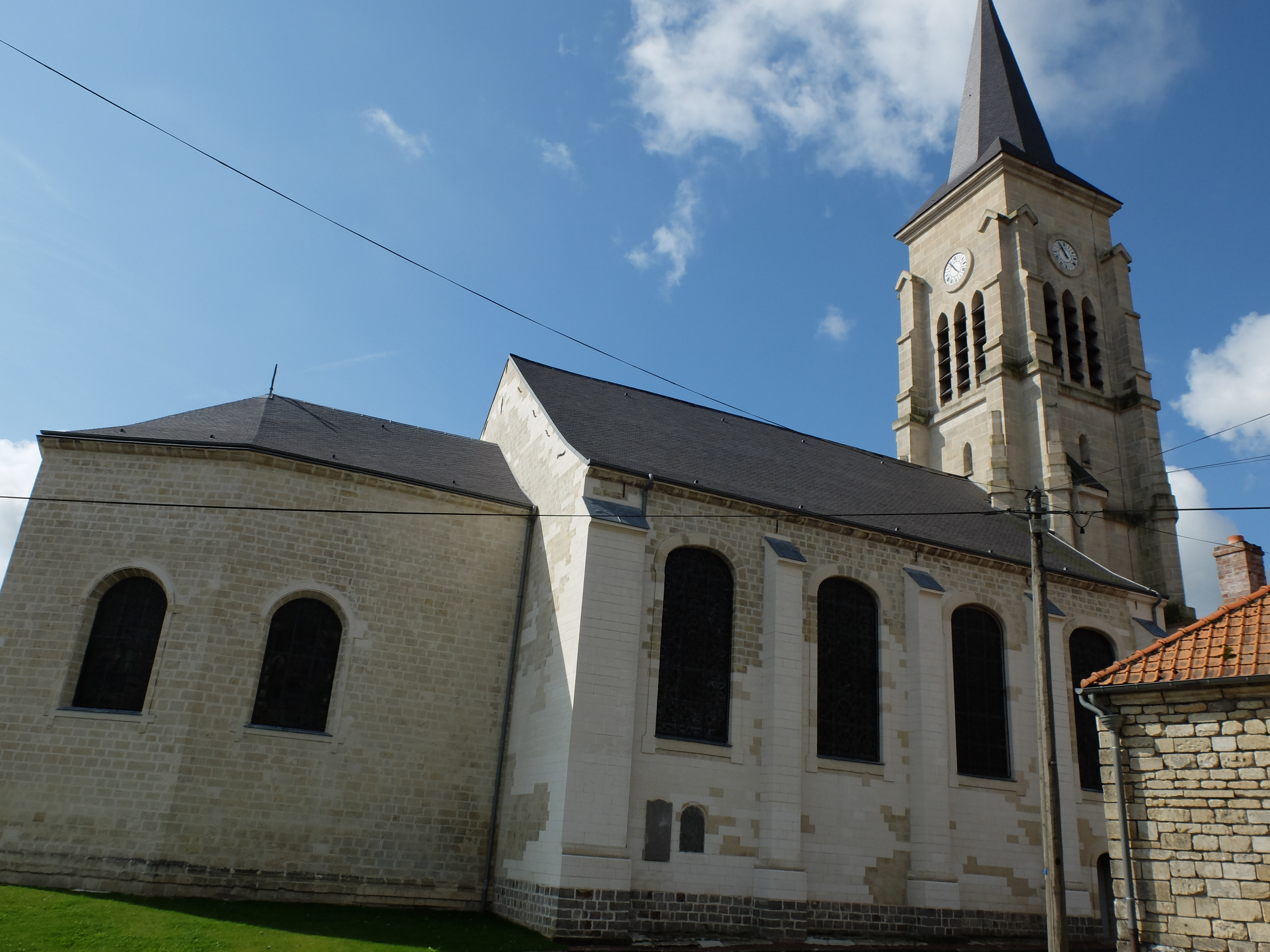
- The church in Avesnes-le-Sec

- Coat of arms
- Location of Avesnes-le-Sec
- Location within France Location within Hauts-de-France
- Coordinates: 50°15′01″N 3°22′42″E
- Country: France
- Region: Hauts-de-France
- Department: Nord
- Arrondissement: Valenciennes
- Canton: Denain
- Intercommunality: CA Porte du Hainaut

Government
  - Mayor (2020–2026): Claude Regniez
- Area^{1}: 10.39 km^{2} (4.01 sq mi)
- Elevation: 61 m (200 ft)
- Highest elevation: 77 m (253 ft)
- Lowest elevation: 48 m (157 ft)
- Population (2023): 1,458
  - Density: 140.3/km^{2} (363.4/sq mi)
- Time zone: UTC+01:00 (CET)
  - Summer (DST): UTC+02:00 (CEST)
- INSEE/Postal code: 59038 /59296
- ^{1} French Land Register data, which excludes lakes, ponds, glaciers > 1 km^{2} (0.386 sq mi or 247 acres) and river estuaries.

Avesnes-le-Sec (French pronunciation: [avɛn lə sɛk]) is a commune in the Nord department in northern France.

== Population ==
Historical population
Year	Pop.	±% p.a.
1968	1,618	—
1975	1,584	−0.30%
1982	1,486	−0.91%
1990	1,389	−0.84%
1999	1,281	−0.90%
2007	1,342	+0.58%
2012	1,405	+0.92%
2017	1,458	+0.74%
2023	1,458	+0.00%
Source: INSEE

== Heraldry ==
Arms of Avesnes-le-Sec	The arms of Avesnes-le-Sec are blazoned : Vert, a chevron between 3 mullets argent.

== See also ==
- Chemin de fer du Cambrésis
- Communes of the Nord department
