= Canton of Denain =

Coordinates: 50.33°N 3.40°E

The canton of Denain is an administrative division of the Nord department, northern France. Its borders were modified at the French canton reorganisation which came into effect in March 2015. Its seat is in Denain.

It consists of the following communes:

1. Abscon
2. Avesnes-le-Sec
3. Bouchain
4. Denain
5. Douchy-les-Mines
6. Émerchicourt
7. Escaudain
8. Hordain
9. Lieu-Saint-Amand
10. Lourches
11. Marquette-en-Ostrevant
12. Mastaing
13. Neuville-sur-Escaut
14. Noyelles-sur-Selle
15. Rœulx
16. Wasnes-au-Bac
17. Wavrechain-sous-Denain
18. Wavrechain-sous-Faulx
