= Wasnes-au-Bac =

- Commune
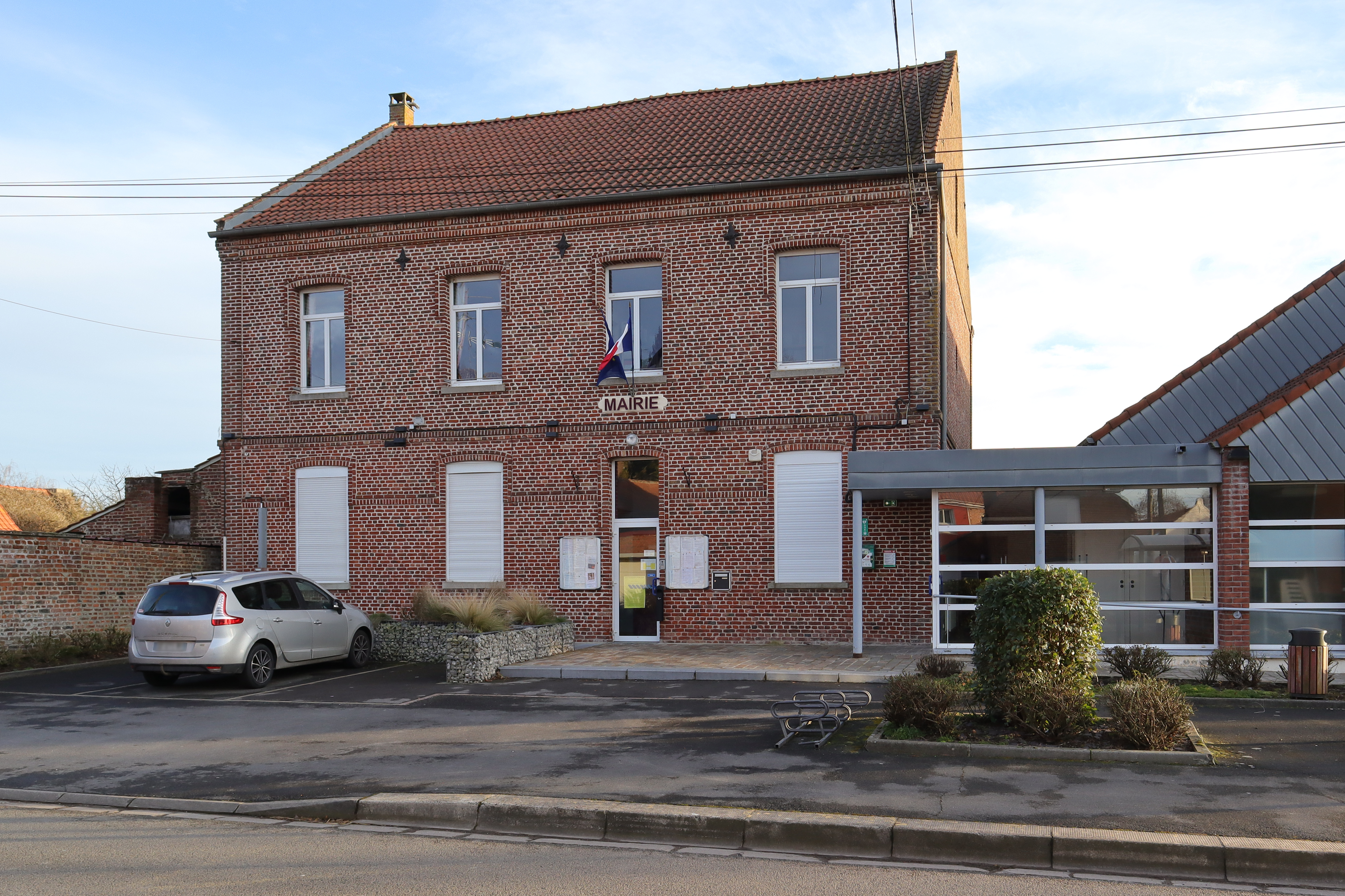
- The town hall in Wasnes-au-Bac

- Coat of arms
- Location of Wasnes-au-Bac
- Location within France Location within Hauts-de-France
- Coordinates: 50°16′17″N 3°15′36″E
- Country: France
- Region: Hauts-de-France
- Department: Nord
- Arrondissement: Valenciennes
- Canton: Denain
- Intercommunality: CA Porte du Hainaut

Government
  - Mayor (2020–2026): Anne Avé-Delattre
- Area^{1}: 5.19 km^{2} (2.00 sq mi)
- Elevation: 42 m (138 ft)
- Highest elevation: 63 m (207 ft)
- Lowest elevation: 32 m (105 ft)
- Population (2023): 604
  - Density: 116/km^{2} (301/sq mi)
- Time zone: UTC+01:00 (CET)
  - Summer (DST): UTC+02:00 (CEST)
- INSEE/Postal code: 59645 /59252
- ^{1} French Land Register data, which excludes lakes, ponds, glaciers > 1 km^{2} (0.386 sq mi or 247 acres) and river estuaries.

Wasnes-au-Bac (French pronunciation: [wan o bak]) is a commune in the Nord department in northern France.

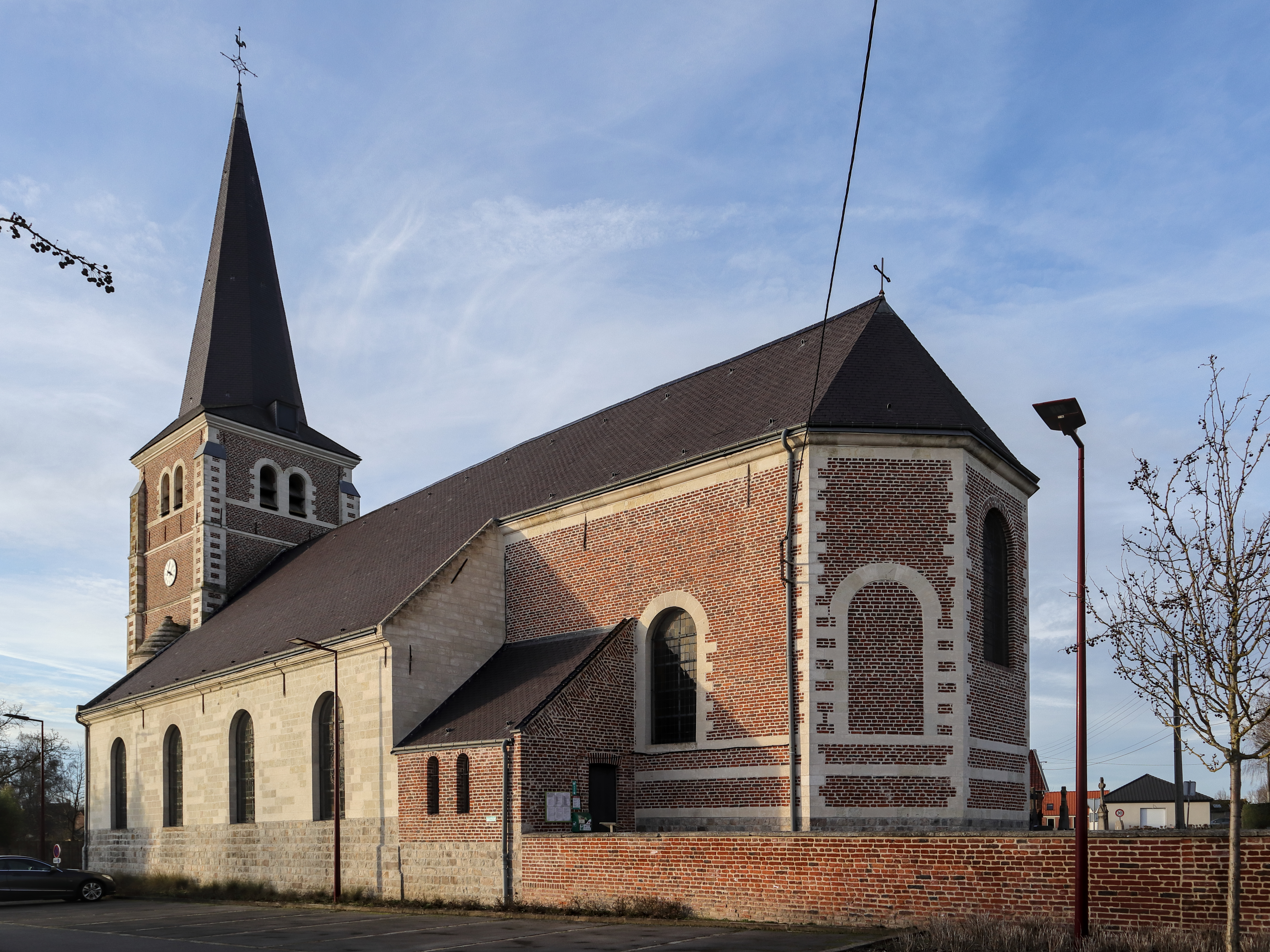
Saint Martin's Church

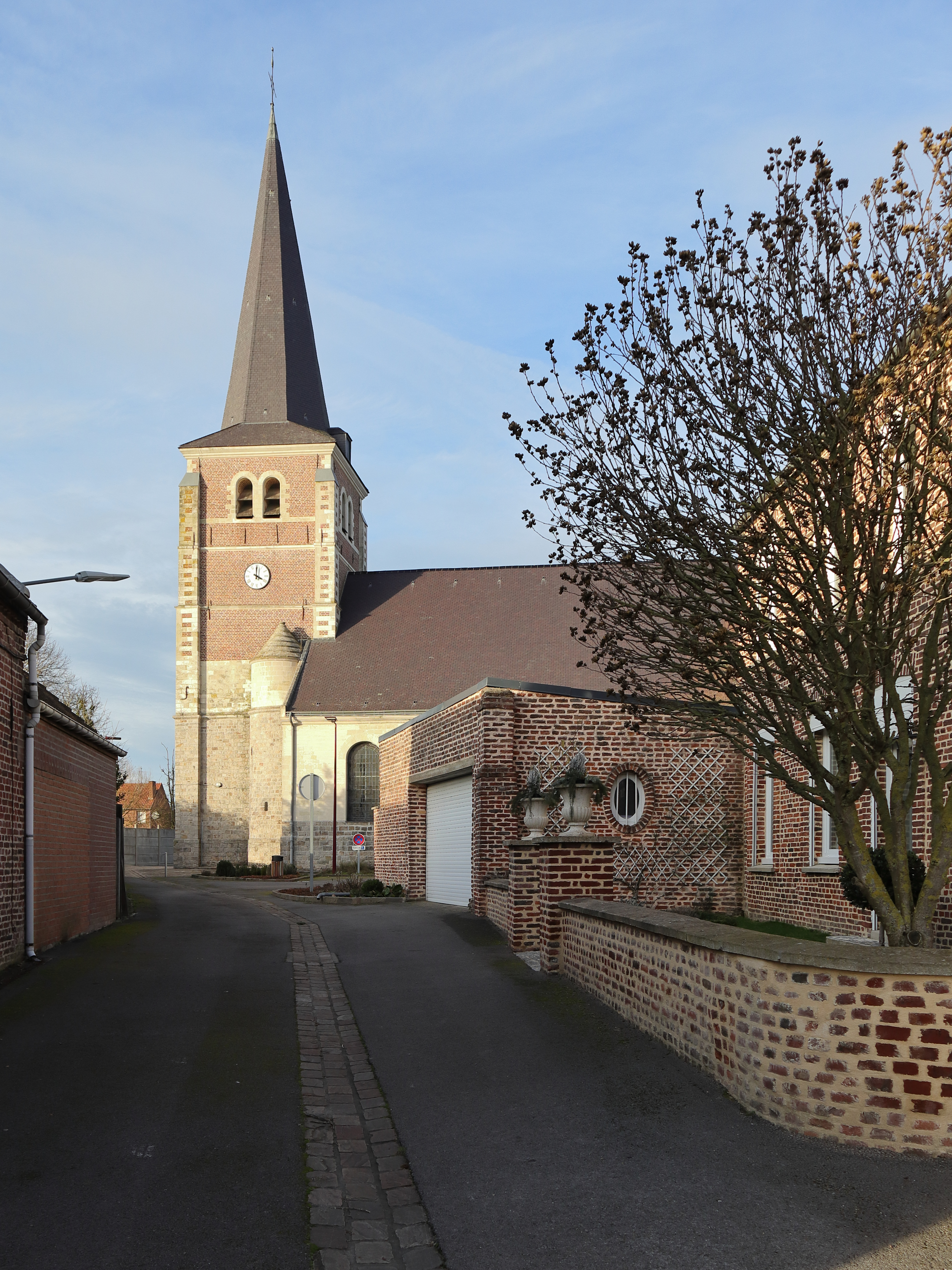

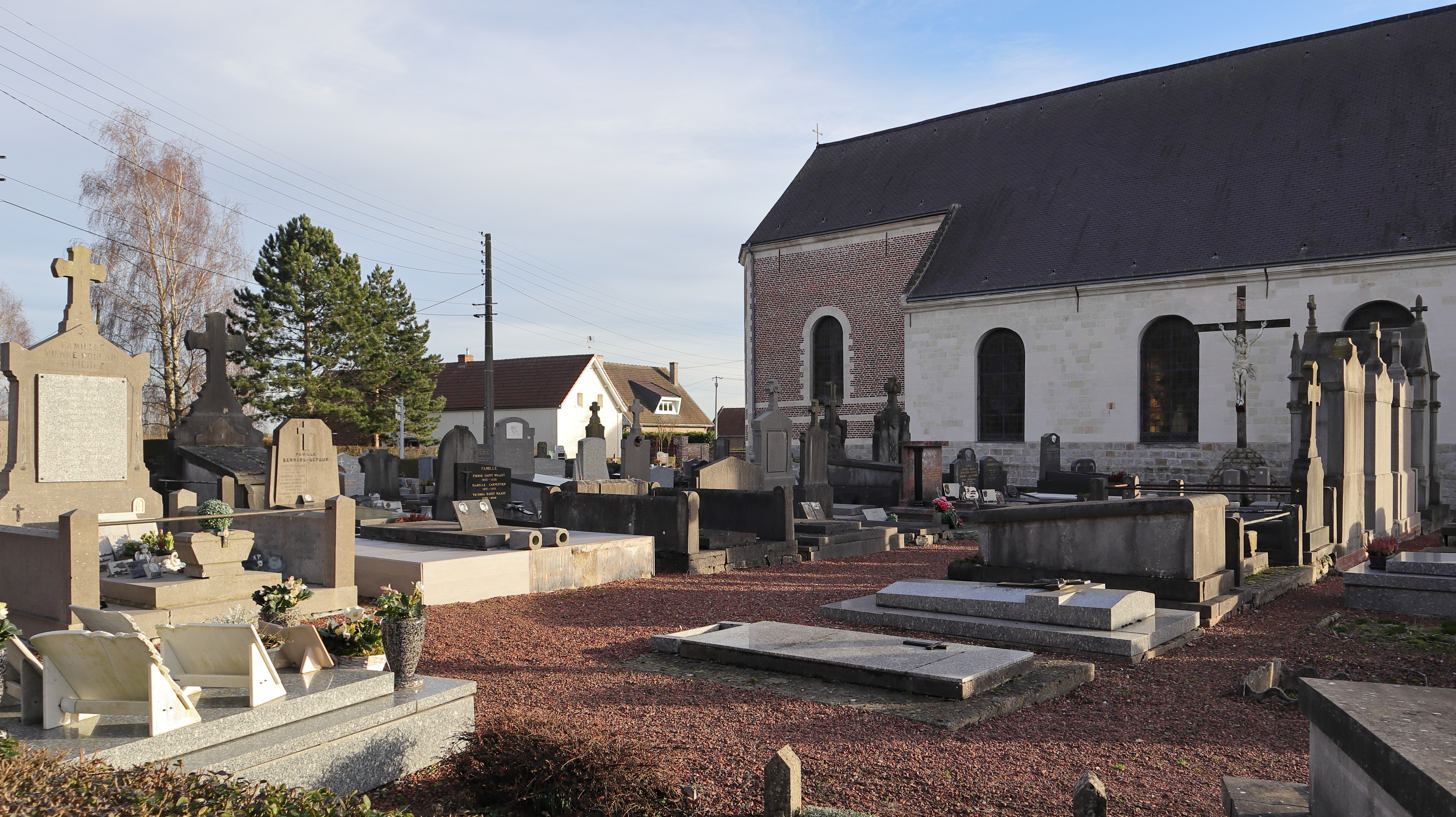
The old cemetery

== Heraldry ==
| Arms of Wasnes-au-Bac | The arms of Wasnes-au-Bac are blazoned : Azure, 3 garbs Or. (in addition to the following, other places use similar arms, but with the garbs tied different colours Chaumes-en-Brie, Bonnétable, Capelle-Fermont, Estevelles, Saint-Sever-Calvados, Gerberoy and Wasnes-au-Bac use the same arms.) |

== Population ==
Historical population
| Year | Pop. | ±% p.a. |
|---|---|---|
| 1968 | 500 | — |
| 1975 | 476 | −0.70% |
| 1982 | 446 | −0.93% |
| 1990 | 483 | +1.00% |
| 1999 | 512 | +0.65% |
| 2007 | 564 | +1.22% |
| 2012 | 584 | +0.70% |
| 2017 | 609 | +0.84% |
| 2023 | 604 | −0.14% |
Source: INSEE

== See also ==
- Communes of the Nord department
