= Rœulx =

- Commune
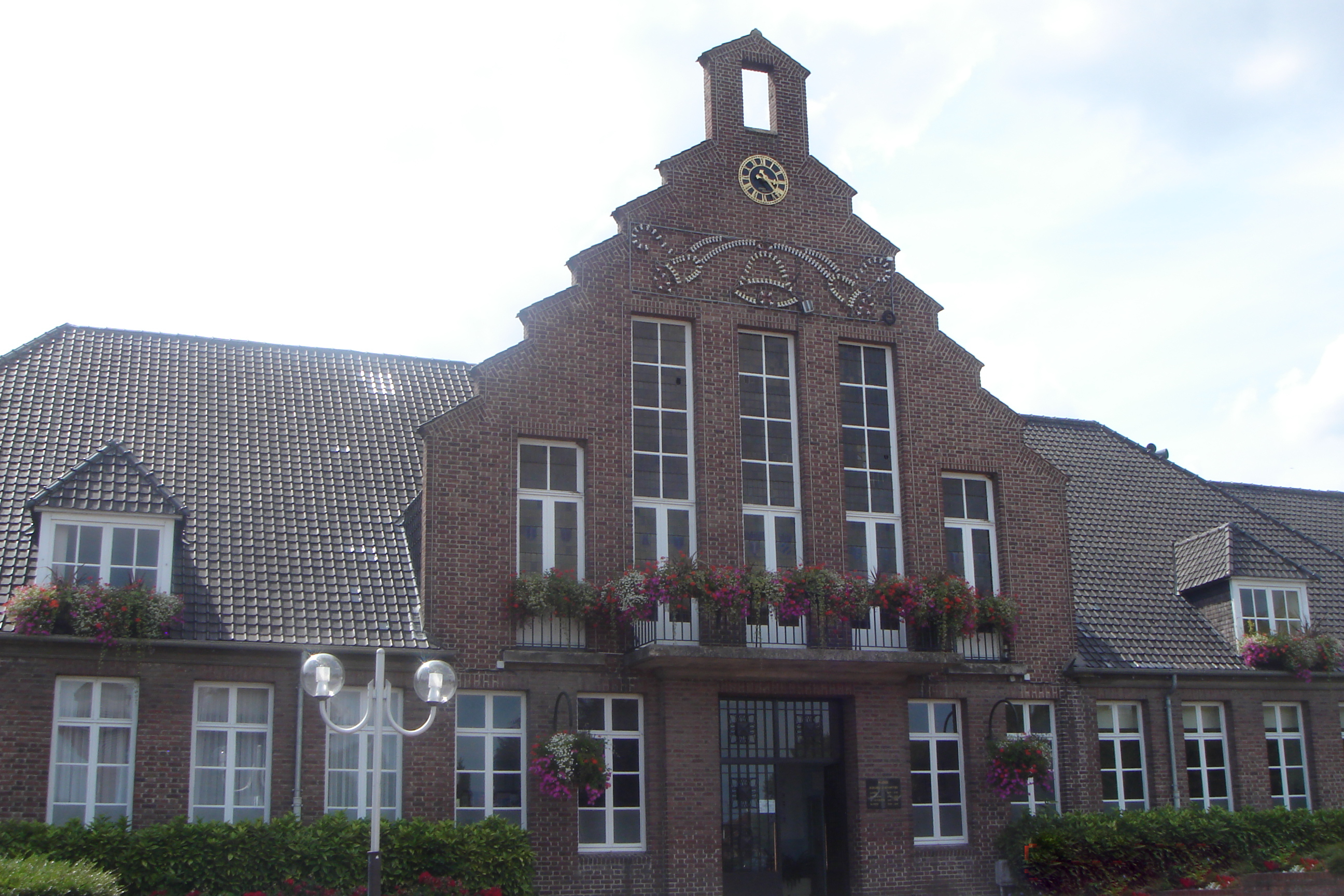
- The town hall in Rœulx

- Coat of arms
- Location of Rœulx
- Location within France Location within Hauts-de-France
- Coordinates: 50°19′N 3°20′E
- Country: France
- Region: Hauts-de-France
- Department: Nord
- Arrondissement: Valenciennes
- Canton: Denain
- Intercommunality: CA Porte du Hainaut

Government
  - Mayor (2020–2026): Charles Lemoine
- Area^{1}: 4.02 km^{2} (1.55 sq mi)
- Elevation: 35 m (115 ft)
- Highest elevation: 53 m (174 ft)
- Lowest elevation: 31 m (102 ft)
- Population (2023): 3,743
  - Density: 931/km^{2} (2,410/sq mi)
- Time zone: UTC+01:00 (CET)
  - Summer (DST): UTC+02:00 (CEST)
- INSEE/Postal code: 59504 /59172
- ^{1} French Land Register data, which excludes lakes, ponds, glaciers > 1 km^{2} (0.386 sq mi or 247 acres) and river estuaries.

Rœulx (French pronunciation: [ʁø]) is a commune in the Nord department in northern France.

It is 5 km (3.1 mi) west-southwest of Denain.

== Population ==
Historical population
Year	Pop.	±% p.a.
1968	3,707	—
1975	4,128	+1.55%
1982	3,900	−0.81%
1990	3,458	−1.49%
1999	3,431	−0.09%
2007	3,674	+0.86%
2012	3,775	+0.54%
2017	3,830	+0.29%
2023	3,743	−0.38%
Source: INSEE

== Heraldry ==
Arms of Rœulx	The arms of Rœulx are blazoned : Bendy Or and azure, a canton argent.

== See also ==
- Communes of the Nord department
