= Dufaux 4 =

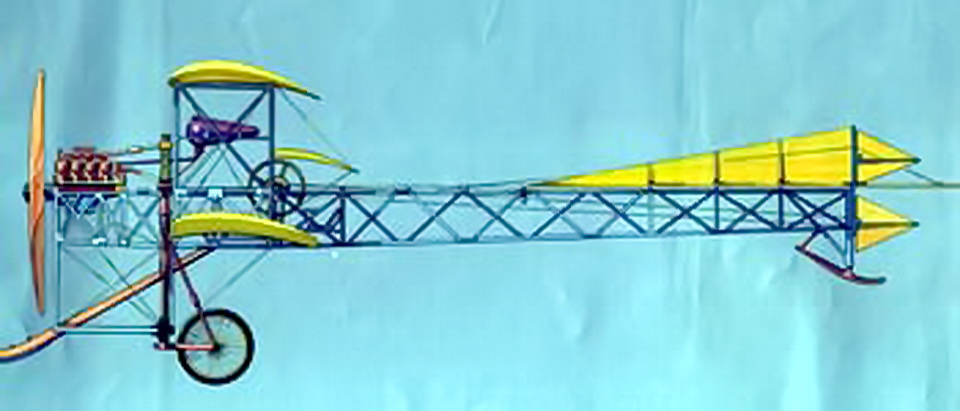

General information
- Type: Experimental aircraft
- Manufacturer: Armand and Henri Dufaux
- Designer: Armand and Henri Dufaux

History
- First flight: 17 December 1909

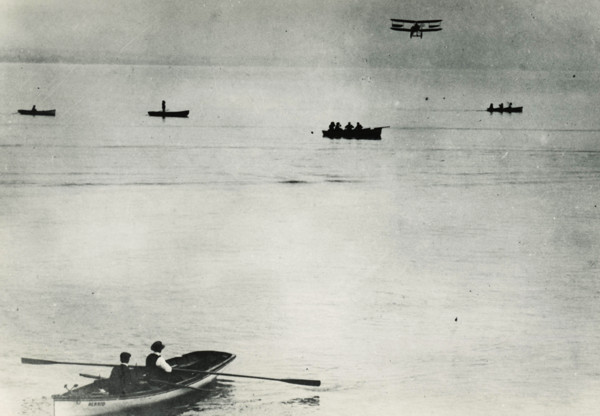
Dufaux 4 piloted by Armand Dufaux over Lake Geneva, August 28, 1910.

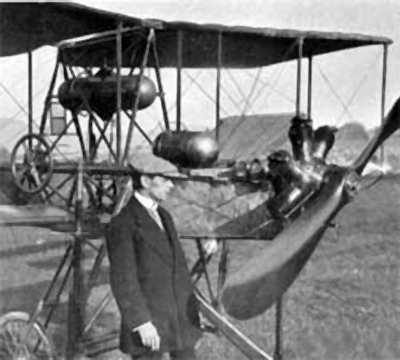
Emile Taddéoli and his Dufaux 4, 1910

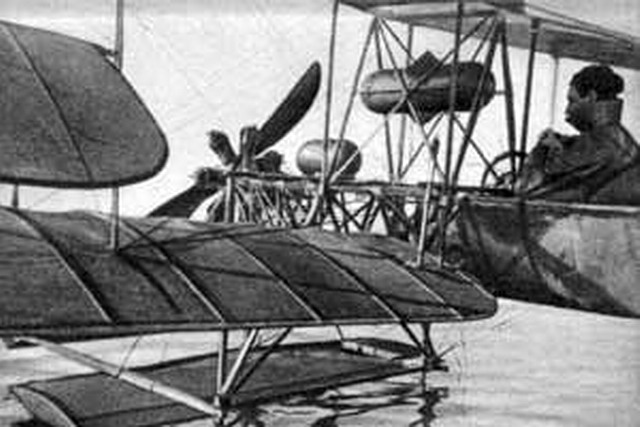
Armand Dufaux in the Dufaux 4 seaplane on Lake Geneva, December 1910

The Dufaux 4 was an experimental aircraft built in Switzerland in 1909 and which was originally constructed as an unnamed biplane, the third aircraft constructed by the brothers Armand and Henri Dufaux. The aircraft was entirely conventional for the era - a two-bay biplane with unstaggered wings of equal span and a triangular-section fuselage. Construction began in mid-September 1909 and work proceeded rapidly, as the brothers hoped to claim a CHF 1,000 prize put up by the Automobile Club de Suisse for the first Swiss-built aircraft to fly a 1 km closed-circuit.

In early December, flight tests commenced at a field in Corsier. Although the machine made a few hops, it would not fly. The Dufaux brothers concluded that the field chosen was too small to give the aircraft enough room to build up speed for takeoff, so they selected a new location for their tests in Viry, in neighbouring France. The aircraft was assembled there on December 16 and a number of successful flights were made that same afternoon. The following day, the aircraft refused to takeoff on a number of attempts, but finally became airborne late in the afternoon. During this flight, at an altitude of 15 metres (50 ft), Henri attempted to bank the aircraft, but instead, it sideslipped to the ground. Both wings and the propeller were destroyed in the crash, but Henri was completely uninjured and the engine was undamaged.

The brothers quickly rebuilt the machine in time to display it at an aviation meet at Colombier, but due to the inclement weather, did not attempt to fly it. By this time the brothers had started building the design, now dubbed the Dufaux 4, in series and were accepting orders for aircraft. In May, the aircraft was demonstrated for the Swiss military, but the brothers were informed that the aircraft was not suitable for military purposes.

The Dufaux 4 is perhaps best remembered for a successful aerial crossing of Lake Geneva, performed by Armande on 28 August. He flew 66 km (41 mi) from St. Gingolph to Geneva at an altitude of around 150 m (500 ft), taking 56 minutes and 5 seconds for the crossing, and collecting a prize of CHF 5,000 that had been put up by the Perrot-Duval Company for this feat.

An example is preserved at the Swiss Transport Museum.

== Specifications ==
Data from

General characteristics

- Crew: 1 pilot
- Length: 9.50 m (31 ft 2 in)
- Wingspan: 8.50 m (27 ft 11 in)
- Height: 2.70 m (8 ft 10 in)
- Wing area: 24.0 m^{2} (258 sq ft)
- Empty weight: 180 kg (397 lb)
- Gross weight: 320 kg (705 lb)
- Powerplant: 1 × Anzani 3-cylinder fan engine , 19 kW (25 hp)

Performance

- Maximum speed: 60 km/h (37 mph, 32 kn)
- Service ceiling: 500 m (1,600 ft)
