= Faux (surname) =

Origin
- Origin: Toponymic surname; ultimately from Old French fou, fau, "beech" from Latin fagus; or from Germanic falisa, "cliff"
- Region of origin: Belgium and France

Other names
- Variant forms: Faulx, Faut
- Cognates: Defauwes, Defauw, De Fauw, Defaux, Dufaux, Defaut, Defau

Faux or Faulx is a surname, ultimately from Latin: fagus ("beech"). The English surname is of Flemish origin.

The Belgian "Faux" and its variants could derive from the adjective faux (Middle French: faulx), "false", but they are most likely toponymic surnames. "Faux" is a variant of "Faulx", and "Faut" is another variant, which could come from either one of them. Cognates and variants include "Defau", "Defaut", "Defauw", "Defauwe" and "De Fauwe". The Belgian surnames could refer to Faux in Court-Saint-Étienne, Wallonia, or Faulx-les-Tombes, also in Wallonia. The etymology is ultimately from Latin: fagus, via Old French: fou, fau (Walloon: faw), "beech". The etymology could also be from Proto-Germanic: *falisa, "cliff".

In France, the surname is present in the North East, but it is also popular in the South West. Surnames from the latter place likely derive from another place called "Faux" (probably Faux in Dordogne). The etymology is always from fagus.

Notable people with the surname include:

- Catherine Faux, British triathlete
- Jean Marie Faux, Jesuit author and professor from Brussels, former general secretary of the Belgian MRAX
- Jeff Faux, American economist, principal founder and first president (1986–2002) of the Economic Policy Institute

== See also ==
- Faut
