= Ernest Failloubaz =

Swiss aviation pioneer (1892–1919)

Ernst Failloubaz
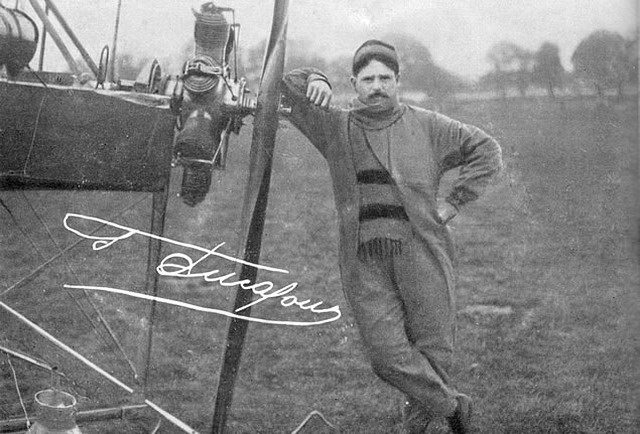
- Ernest Failloubaz
- Born: 27 July 1892; Avenches, Switzerland
- Died: 14 May 1919 (aged 26); Lausanne, Switzerland
- Occupations: Pilot, investor, entrepreneur
- Known for: First pilot licensed in Switzerland; Most prominent Swiss aviation pioneer

Ernest Failloubaz (27 July 1892 in Avenches – 14 May 1919 in Lausanne) was a Swiss aviation pioneer. He received pilot's licence number 1, issued in Switzerland on 11 October 1910, and made the first flight in Switzerland of an aircraft built and flown by a Swiss citizen.

== Life ==
Ernest Failloubaz' father Jules, a rich wine merchant, died when Ernest was four years old. Six years later his mother Emilie also died. His grandmother and aunt, who owned the local bakery, then took care of him. As a child, Ernest was already passionate about mechanics and speed and convinced his grandmother to buy him probably one of the first motorcycles in Switzerland, and later an automobile.

== The beginnings of Swiss aviation ==
In early 1909, at 17, Failloubaz met René Grandjean, who planned to build his own aircraft, using only a picture of Louis Blériot's aircraft. They completed this first aircraft in October 1909. Ground tests started in February 1910 at the l’Estivage field in Avenches. On 10 May 1910, with Failloubaz at the controls, it took off, flew, and landed smoothly, on the first flight in Switzerland of an aircraft built and flown by a Swiss citizen. Grandjean also succeeded in doing this, a few days after his friend's first flight.

Failloubaz went to Paris at the end of May 1910, to buy a Santos-Dumont Demoiselle, and brought it back immediately to Avenches, where he trained daily. A few months later, having reached the limits of the Demoiselle, he bought a more powerful Blériot monoplane, to allow to fly higher and further.

With this aircraft, Failloubaz participated at the air show in Viry, Haute-Savoie in August 1910, and dared to do what no one else had ever attempted before: stopping the engine in flight, gliding, and restarting his engine. On 28 September 1910, he succeeded in the first city-to-city flight in Switzerland, from Avenches to Payerne, lasting six minutes.

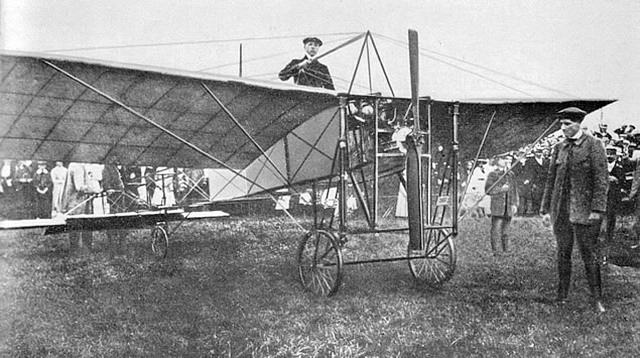
Failloubaz and Grandjean at the first Swiss flight meeting in Avenches

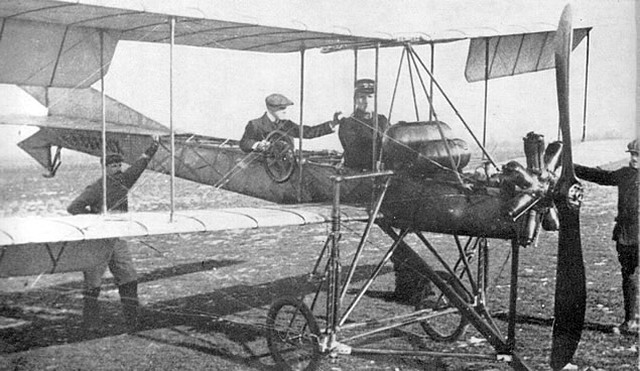
Ernest Failloubaz (pilot) and Gustave Lecoultre (observer) demonstrating the Dufaux 5 to the Swiss Army from 4 to 6 September 1911

On 2 October Failloubaz participated in the first Swiss air show, in Avenches. From October 8 to 10, at the Bern meeting, he set a national record for the longest flight, with 58 minutes and 17 seconds.

On 1 October 1910, Failloubaz obtained Swiss pilot's licence number 1, with congratulations from the Confederation's president and a gold watch inscribed "The Swiss Confederation to Ernest Failloubaz. Licence No 1 October 1910." The same day, the first Swiss airport and the first pilot school was inaugurated in Avenches.

In January 1911, Failloubaz received a new aircraft from Armand Dufaux, a Dufaux 5 biplane. Failloubaz later acquired a licence to build it in Switzerland as the Failloubaz-Licence Dufaux. On 11 May 1911, the airport company and flying school of Avenches was founded, with Failloubaz the main financier. From 4 to 6 September 1911 Failloubaz participated as pilot (his friend Gustave Lecoultre as observer) at an exercise with the 1st Swiss Army Corps, to demonstrate the military possibilities of aircraft with his Dufaux 5; the beginning of the military aviation in Switzerland.

On 1 October 1911, 15,000 visitors followed Failloubaz' exploits at the flight meeting in Avenches. Guided by counsellors, Failloubaz invested all his money in the first Swiss flight school, an aircraft production facility, and the airport in Avenches.

Money began to go missing, politicians who had supported Failloubaz began to abandon him, and he went bankrupt. At the beginning of World War I, he failed the medical examination for future military pilots. At the time, he was director of the new airport in Dübendorf.

On 28 April 1916, Failloubaz visited l’Estivage airfield one last time. Marcel Pasche landed with a brand new Blériot, and agreed to lend him this aircraft. That evening, Failloubaz evening made his final flight.

Failloubaz died in the cantonal hospital of Lausanne of tuberculosis at age 26.

== Honor ==
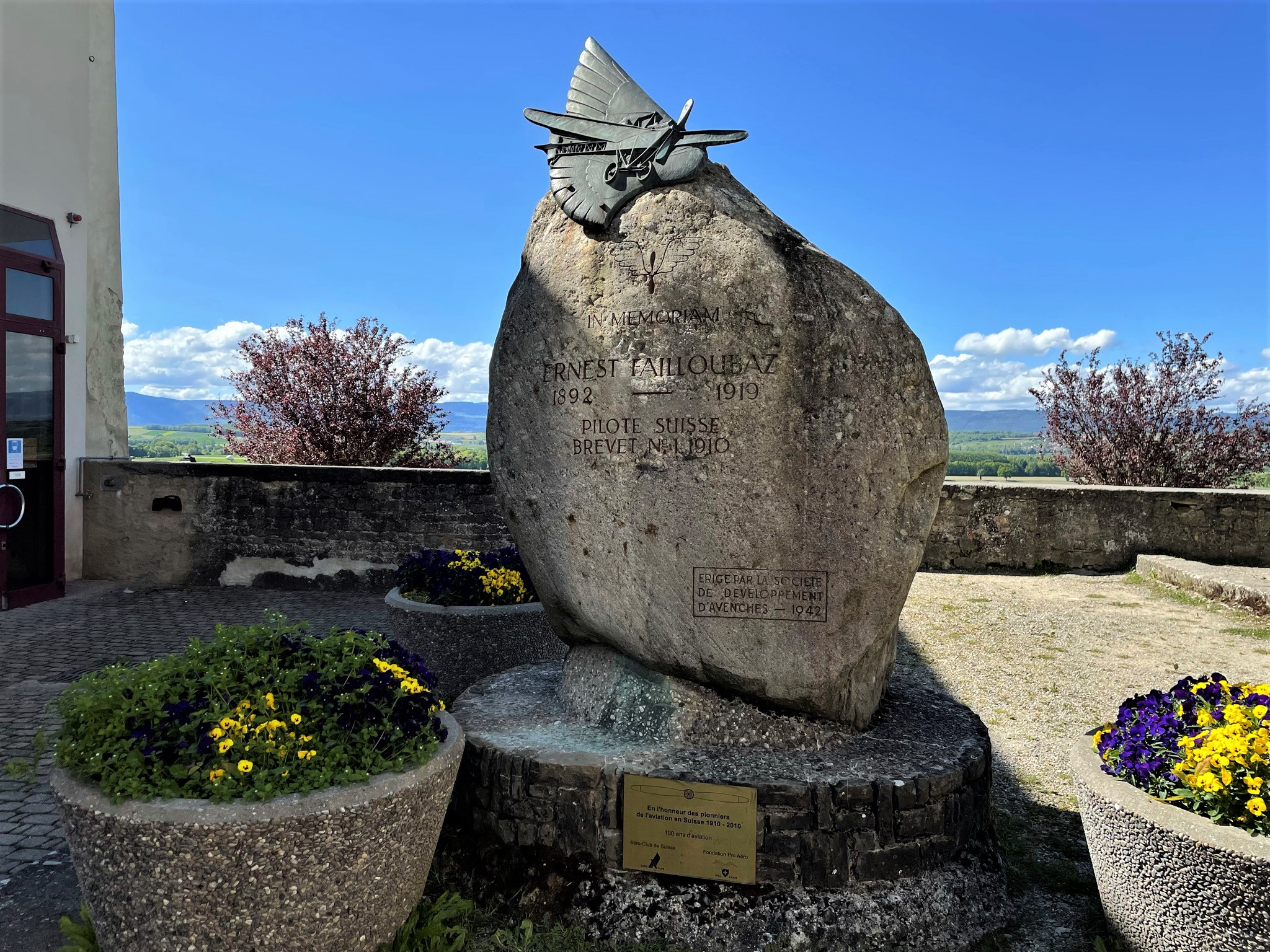
a monument in memory of Ernest Failloubaz in Avenches

In 1942, a monument in memory of Ernest Failloubaz was erected in Avenches, in 1960 a second one by the Swiss government at the Swiss Air Force airport in Payerne.

Failloubaz is commemorated in a Swiss postage stamp issued on 4 March 2010, to celebrate 100 years aviation in Switzerland.
