= Ernest Faut =

Belgian painter (1879–1961)

- Born: Ernest Faut; 27 January 1879; Ghent, Belgium
- Died: 16 October 1961 (aged 82); Leuven, Belgium
- Education: Royal Academy of Fine Arts, Brussels; Academy of Leuven
- Occupation: Painter

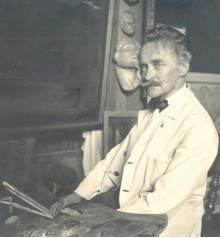
Ernest Faut

Ernest Faut (27 January 1879 – 16 October 1961) was a Flemish - Belgian painter. He was a draftsman, painter and lithographer of decorative works, landscapes, interiors, psychological portraits, religious scenes, churches and beguinages.

== Life and work ==
Ernest Faut started his education at the Academy of Leuven with Constantin Meunier and also studied at the Royal Academy of Fine Arts, Brussels with Constant Montald. He was a professor for forty years (until 1944) at the Academy of Leuven, which he directed near the end of his stint.

Faut delivered technically very strong paintings, with a delicate and sensitive range of colors. Faut also used the chiaroscuro technique. In the 1930s, his work mainly featured symbolic scenes with a late after-effect of Art Nouveau influences. Some paintings are characterized by a hazy melancholy while others amplify the (human) anatomy.

Faut's work is dispersed in several museums, including the M – Museum of Leuven, and was exhibited in Louvain, Ghent, Brussels, Antwerp, Liège, Madrid, and Barcelona. His work is also auctioned internationally. For instance, in February 2026 two of his Art Nouveau style drawings (44.5 cm x 60.5 cm) were auctioned in Paris for 8,606 euro.

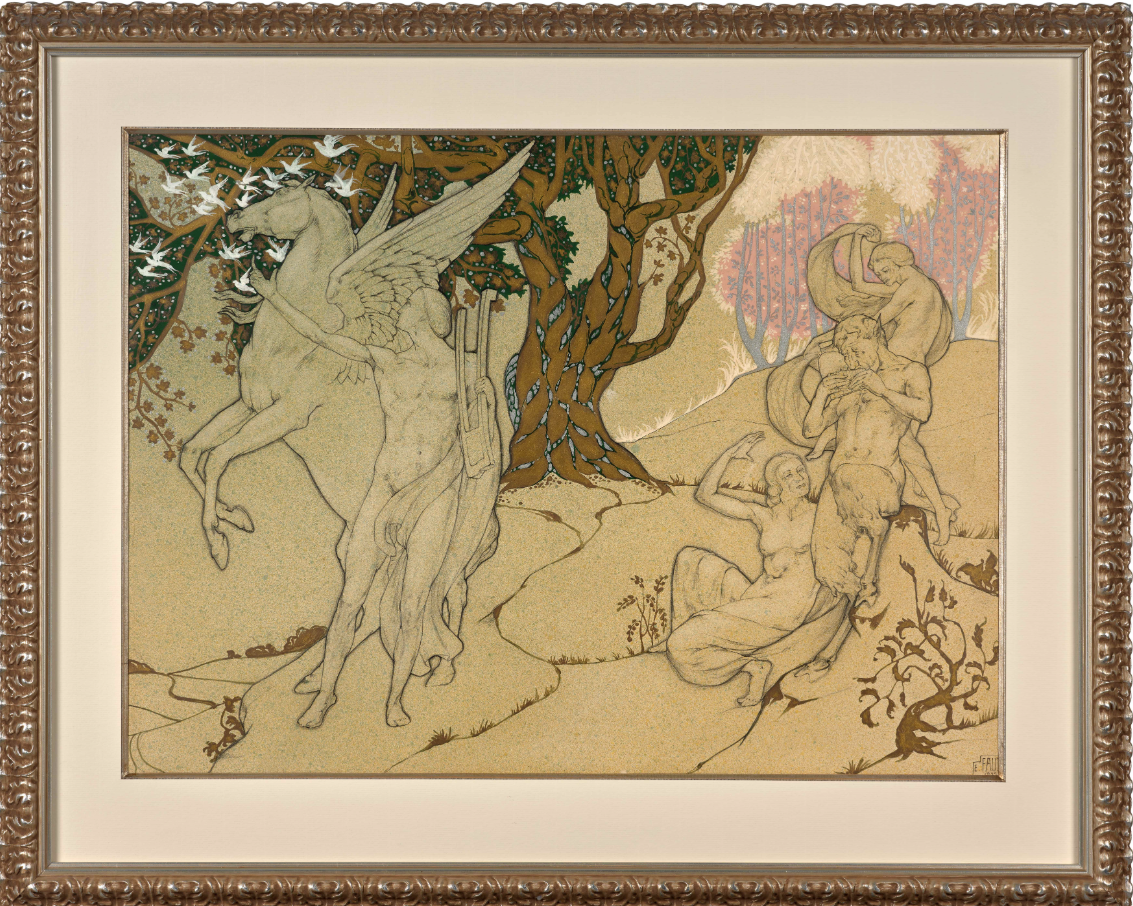
Pegasus tamed by Orpheus, 1935

== Bibliography ==
- Leuven Historisch Genootschap. Ernest Faut: kunstschilder. Driemaandelijks Tijdschrift 26, Jaargang 7 september 2010
- Marc Eemans, Biografische woordenboek der Belgische kunstenaars van 1830 tot 1970, 1979, vol. 1, p. 216
- Paul Piron, De Belgische beeldende kunstenaars uit de 19de en 20ste eeuw, 1999, vol. 1, p. 550
- La Renaissance du Livre, Le dictionnaire des peintres Belges du XIVe siècle à nos jours Bruxelles, 1994
- Hans Vollmer, Allgemeines Lexikon der bildenden Künstler des XX. Jahrhunderts. Leipzig, 1953
