= Pauw =

Pauw (Dutch for "peacock"), de Pauw or DePauw are variants of a Dutch or Flemish surname and may refer to:

== Institutions ==
- DePauw University, Greencastle, Indiana, named for Washington C. DePauw

== People ==
Pauw

- Adriaan Pauw (1585–1653), Dutch Grand Pensionary of Holland
- Jacques Pauw, South African investigative journalist
- Michiel Pauw (1590–1640), Mayor of Amsterdam and a director of the Dutch West India Company
- Pieter Pauw (1564–1617), Dutch botanist and anatomist
- Vera Pauw (born 1963), Dutch football coach and former player

De Pauw / DePauw

- Ayrton De Pauw (born 1998), Belgian racing cyclist
- Bart De Pauw (born 1968), Belgian television producer, comedian and scriptwriter
- Cornelius de Pauw (1739–1799), Dutch scholar at the court of Frederick the Great of Prussia
- Gommar DePauw (1918–2005), Belgian traditionalist Catholic priest
- Johanna de Paauw (1933–1989), Dutch jazz singer using the pseudonym "Ann Burton"
- Josse De Pauw (born 1952), Belgian artist and actor
- Henri De Pauw (born 1911, date of death unknown), Belgian water polo player
- Linda Grant DePauw (born 1940), American modern historian, retired university teacher, non-fiction author, journal editor
- Lydia De Pauw (born 1929), Belgian politician
- Moreno De Pauw (born 1991), Belgian racing cyclist
- Nill De Pauw (born 1990), Belgian footballer
- Noël De Pauw (1942–2015), Belgian racing cyclist
- Roger De Pauw (1921–2020), Belgian racing cyclist
- Tony De Pauw, Belgian businessman
- Washington C. DePauw (1822–1887), American industrialist of Indiana

== Places ==
- Named for Washington C. DePauw:
  - Depauw, Indiana, an unincorporated community
  - DePauw Avenue Historic District, New Albany, Indiana

== See also ==
- Pavonia, New Netherland, named for Michiel Pauw
