= Wavrechain-sous-Denain =

- Commune
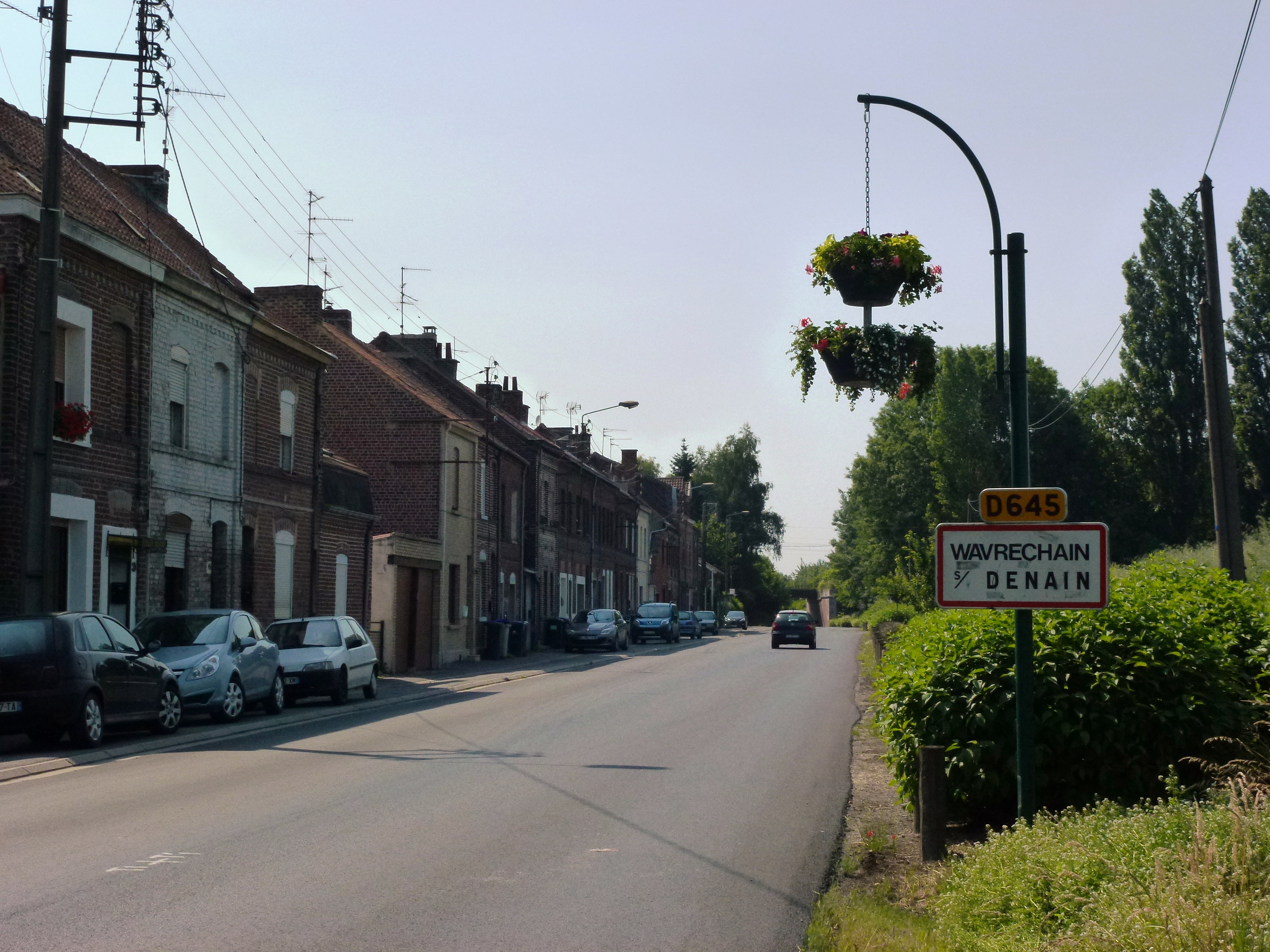
- The road into Wavrechain-sous-Denain
- Location of Wavrechain-sous-Denain
- Location within France Location within Hauts-de-France
- Coordinates: 50°19′54″N 3°24′56″E
- Country: France
- Region: Hauts-de-France
- Department: Nord
- Arrondissement: Valenciennes
- Canton: Denain
- Intercommunality: Porte du Hainaut

Government
  - Mayor (2022–2026): Jacques Delcroix
- Area^{1}: 2.37 km^{2} (0.92 sq mi)
- Elevation: 31 m (102 ft)
- Highest elevation: 45 m (148 ft)
- Lowest elevation: 29 m (95 ft)
- Population (2023): 1,599
  - Density: 675/km^{2} (1,750/sq mi)
- Time zone: UTC+01:00 (CET)
  - Summer (DST): UTC+02:00 (CEST)
- INSEE/Postal code: 59651 /59220
- ^{1} French Land Register data, which excludes lakes, ponds, glaciers > 1 km^{2} (0.386 sq mi or 247 acres) and river estuaries.

Wavrechain-sous-Denain (French pronunciation: [wavʁəʃɛ̃ su dənɛ̃], literally Wavrechain under Denain) is a commune in the Nord department in northern France.

== Population ==
Historical population
Year	Pop.	±% p.a.
1968	1,956	—
1975	1,791	−1.25%
1982	1,929	+1.07%
1990	1,797	−0.88%
1999	1,731	−0.41%
2007	1,737	+0.04%
2012	1,616	−1.43%
2017	1,661	+0.55%
2023	1,599	−0.63%
Source: INSEE

== See also ==
- Communes of the Nord department
