= Ken De Fauw =

Belgian cyclist

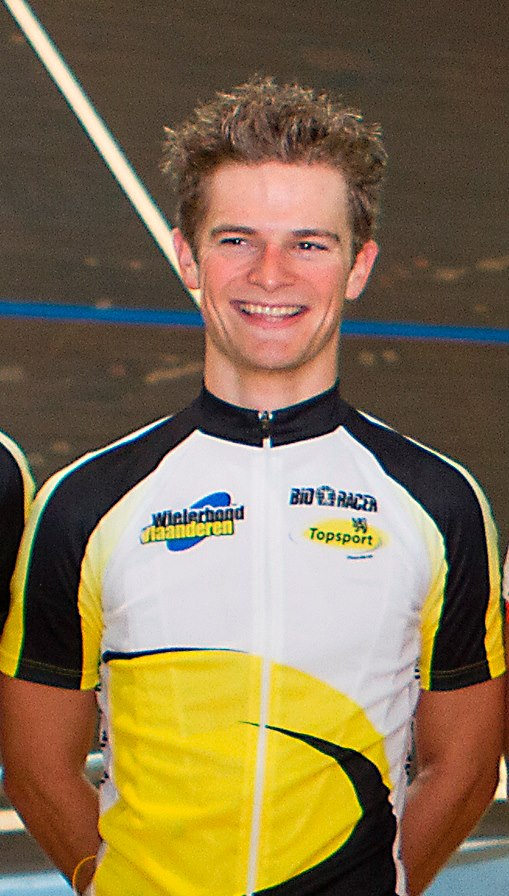
- De Fauw in 2012

Personal information
- Full name: Ken De Fauw
- Born: 19 September 1991 (age 35) Ghent, Belgium
- Height: 182 cm (6 ft 0 in)
- Weight: 76 kg (168 lb)

Cycling career
- Sport: Cycling
- Disciplines: Road and track
- Role: Rider

Ken De Fauw (born 19 September 1991) is a Belgian cyclist active both in track and road cycling. He is the son of former national track cycling coach Marc De Fauw and the cousin of former cyclist Dimitri De Fauw.

== Biography ==
He was born on 19 September 1991 in Ghent, Belgium. He is the son of Marc, a former track cycling coach, and he is a cousin of Dimitri. In 2013 he raced while working for his master's degree in Industrial Sciences at Ghent University.

In 2017 he placed 29th at the 2017 Stan Ockers Classic.

== Career achievements ==
=== Road cycling ===
2016
2nd Belgian Cup - GP Georges Lassaut Rummen

Junior

2011
1st Memorial Dimitri De Fauw U23

=== Track cycling ===
Junior

2007
2nd team race (with Niels Van Laer), Belgian Track Cycling Championship U17
2008
2nd team pursuit, Belgian Track Cycling Championship U19
2009
7th team race (with Arne Van Snick), UEC European Track Championships U19
2nd team pursuit, Belgian Track Cycling Championship U19
3rd points race, Belgian Track Cycling Championship U19
2010
3rd team race (with Moreno De Pauw), Belgian Track Cycling Championship U23
2011
2nd 1000m, Belgian Track Cycling Championship U23
3rd team pursuit, Belgian Track Cycling Championship U23
2013
2nd team pursuit, Belgian Track Cycling Championship U23
