= Faux (band) =

English alternative rock band

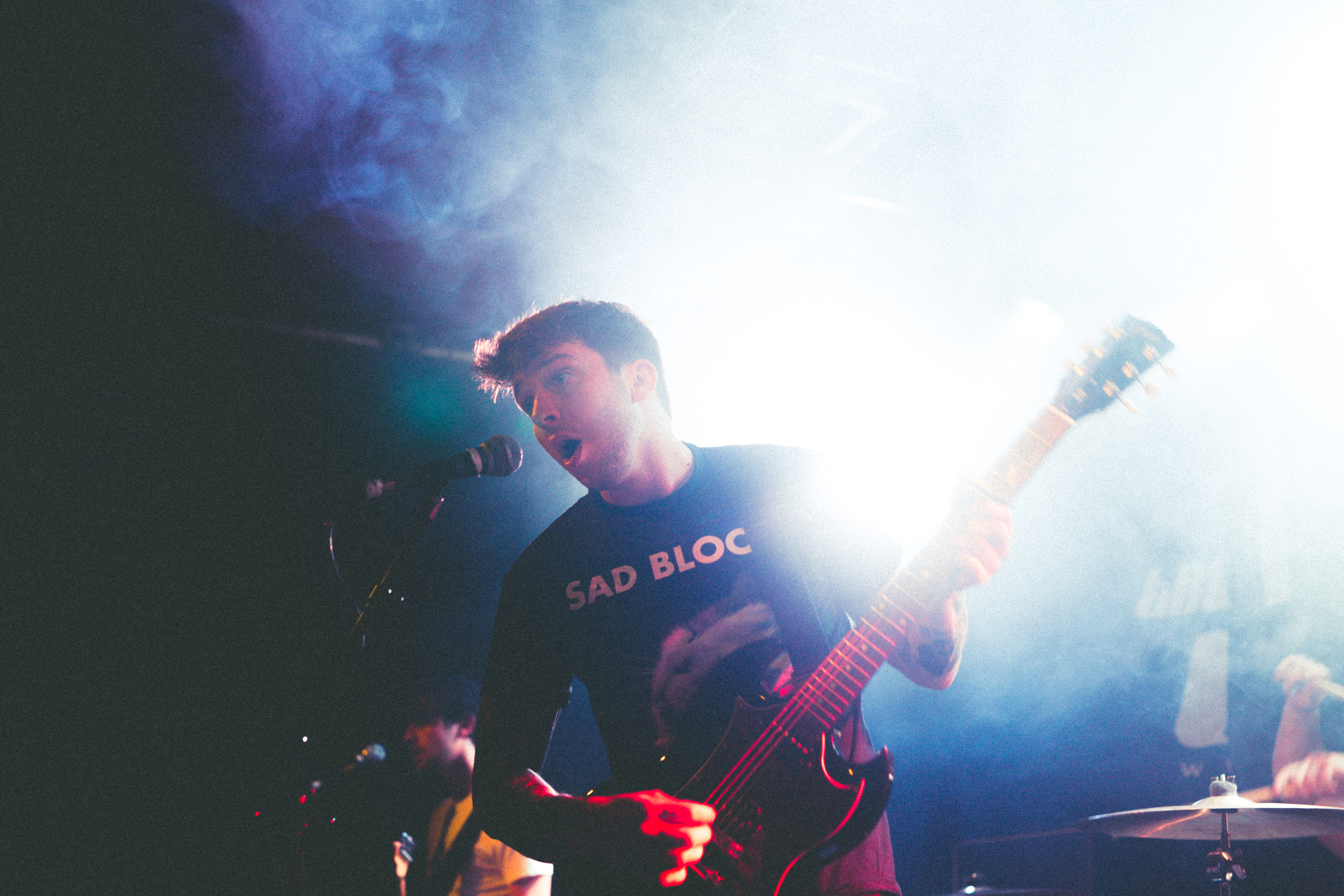

Background information
- Origin: Southampton, Hampshire, England
- Genres: Alternative rock; indie rock
- Years active: 2015-present
- Labels: Speaking Tongues
- Members: Lee Male; Luke Gould; James Cross; Daly George
- Past members: Daniel Fisher; Kieran Marsh
- Website: www.fauxband.co.uk

Faux is an English alternative rock band formed in Southampton, Hampshire in 2015 by Lee Male on lead vocals and guitar, Luke Gould on bass and James Cross on drums. The band went through a couple of lead guitarists before striking a rapport with producer Daly George while working with him on their first EP at The Ranch in Southampton. Faux's latest Ep (self titled) received praise from Kerrang! and the first single Hot Headed was premiered by Alex Baker on his Fresh Blood show.

== Musical style and influence ==
Faux have cited musical influences including The 1975, Brand New, TTNG and The Hives; leading to them being described as Alternative rock, pop punk and British rock.

== Members ==
=== Current line-up ===
- Lee Male - Lead Vocals (2015–present), rhythm guitar (2015-2017)
- Luke Gould - Bass (2015–present)
- James Cross - Drums (2015–present)
- Daly George - Guitar (2016–present)
- Steve Colver - Guitar (2017–present)

=== Past members ===
- Daniel Fisher - Guitar (2015-2016)
- Kieran Marsh - Guitar (2015)

== Discography ==
=== EPs ===
- Patterns (2015)
- Inhale (2016)
- Self Titled (2017)

=== Singles ===
- "Swimmingly" (2015)
- "Inhale" (2016)
- "Hot Headed" (2017)
- "Body Head" (2018)
- "Gods Plan" (2018)
