= Frederic Dufaux =

Frederic Dufaux is an electrical engineer with Telecom ParisTech in Paris, France. Dufaux was named a Fellow of the Institute of Electrical and Electronics Engineers (IEEE) in 2016 for his contributions to visual information processing and coding.

Dufaux serves as an Editor-in-Chief of the Signal Processing: Image Communication and is a member of the Technical Directions Board of the French National Center for Scientific Research.
