= Wavrechain-sous-Faulx =

- Commune
- The church in Wavrechain-sous-Faulx

- Coat of arms
- Location of Wavrechain-sous-Faulx
- Location within France Location within Hauts-de-France
- Coordinates: 50°16′24″N 3°17′14″E
- Country: France
- Region: Hauts-de-France
- Department: Nord
- Arrondissement: Valenciennes
- Canton: Denain
- Intercommunality: CA Porte du Hainaut

Government
  - Mayor (2020–2026): André Leprêtre
- Area^{1}: 3.8 km^{2} (1.5 sq mi)
- Elevation: 38 m (125 ft)
- Highest elevation: 59 m (194 ft)
- Lowest elevation: 31 m (102 ft)
- Population (2023): 440
  - Density: 120/km^{2} (300/sq mi)
- Time zone: UTC+01:00 (CET)
  - Summer (DST): UTC+02:00 (CEST)
- INSEE/Postal code: 59652 /59111
- ^{1} French Land Register data, which excludes lakes, ponds, glaciers > 1 km^{2} (0.386 sq mi or 247 acres) and river estuaries.

Wavrechain-sous-Faulx (French pronunciation: [wavʁəʃɛ̃ su fo]) is a commune in the Nord department in northern France.

== Heraldry ==
Arms of Wavrechain-sous-Faulx	The arms of Wavrechain-sous-Faulx are blazoned : Or, 3 leopards sable impaled with Azure, a chevron Or between 3 bezants (Or).

== Population ==
Historical population
Year	Pop.	±% p.a.
1968	393	—
1975	393	+0.00%
1982	357	−1.36%
1990	375	+0.62%
1999	368	−0.21%
2007	416	+1.54%
2012	395	−1.03%
2017	386	−0.46%
2023	440	+2.21%
Source: INSEE

== See also ==
- Communes of the Nord department
