= Henri Dufaux =

Swiss painter and aviation pioneer

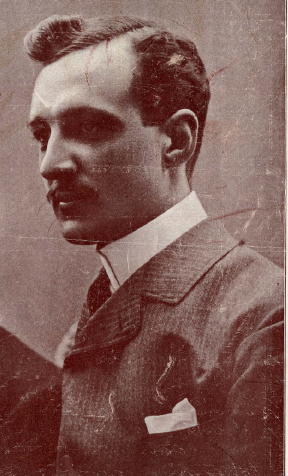

Henri Dufaux (18 September 1879, Chens-sur-Léman – 25 December 1980, Geneva) was a French-Swiss painter.

== Biography ==
Henri Dufaux and his brother Armand (born 13 January 1883) were the sons of Frederic Dufaux and Baroness Noémie de Rochefort Luçay, whose father Henri Rochefort had taken refuge in Switzerland after escaping exile by Napoleon III. Henri studied at the Ecole des Beaux Arts and well as in Florence and Geneva. Armand studied mechanical engineering and together the brothers built a clip-on engine for a bicycle in 1898. They went on to design, invent, and patent motorcycle engines, mopeds, airplanes, and helicopters.
