= Armand Dufaux =

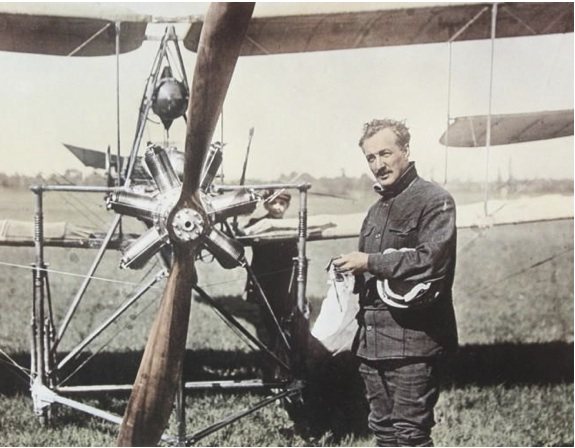
Armand Dufaux

Armand Dufaux (1883–1941) was a Swiss aviation pioneer who became famous for flying the length of Lake Geneva in 1910.

His mother was Noémie de Rochefort-Luçay, daughter of French politician Henri Rochefort and his father was Swiss artist Auguste Frederic Dufaux, known as Frederic. Armand was one of three children. His older brother Henri Dufaux was also an aviation pioneer. Their maternal grandfather Henri Rochefort financially supported his grandsons' initial aeronautic experiments.

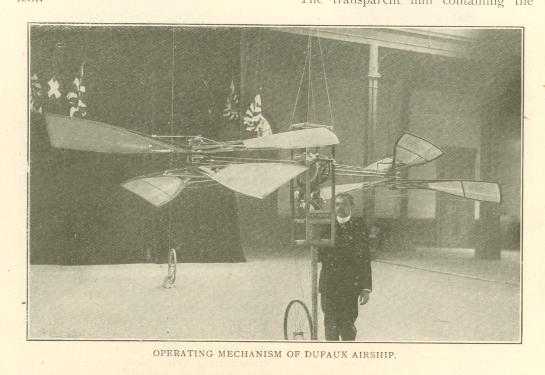
Dufaux Airship 1906

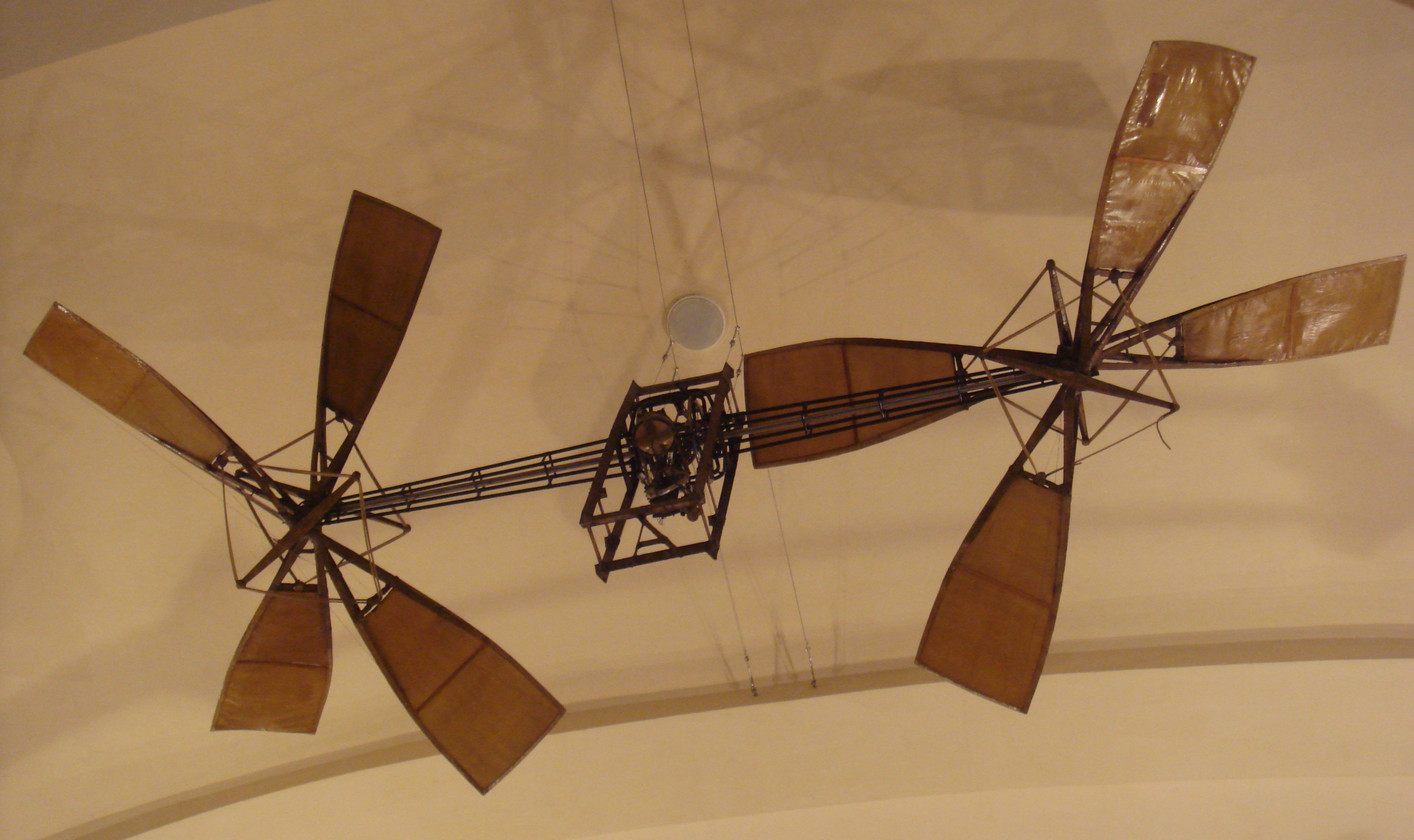
Dufaux helicopter (1905). Musée des Arts et Métiers, Paris.

He and his brother, Henri, were natives of Geneva. Their first design was a model helicopter weighing 17 kg (37 lb), which successfully achieved flight in April 1905. This was followed by a triplane that was unable to fly, then a third design that crashed on its first flight.

The Dufaux 4 was their first successful craft. On 28 August 1910, Armand flew it from St. Gingolph to Geneva (about 40 mi (64 km) in just 56 minutes and 5 seconds, and winning the Perrot-Duval prize of 5,000 Swiss francs for the feat.

Later that year, the brothers established an aircraft business, and in 1911, sold their Dufaux 5 to 18-year-old Ernest Failloubaz.

A stamp of the Swiss Post published in 1977 is reminiscent of the joint work of the brothers. "The Dufaux brothers can make use of the engine flight in Switzerland from the stage of experimentation, the theory, into practice."

The Dufaux 4 is today on display at the Swiss Transport Museum. In 1997, Armand Dufaux was honored on a Swiss postage stamp, as one of four pioneers of Swiss aviation.
