= Viry, Haute-Savoie =

Viry Vry (Savoyard)
- Commune
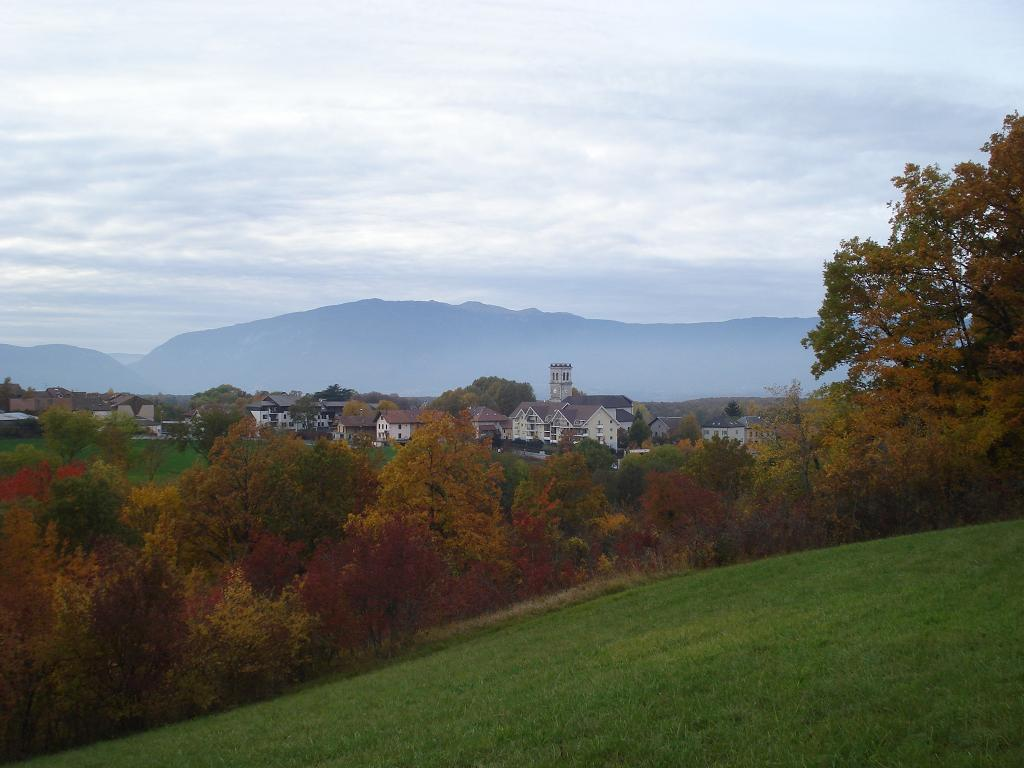
- A general view of Viry
- Location of Viry
- Location within France Location within Auvergne-Rhône-Alpes
- Coordinates: 46°07′06″N 6°02′18″E
- Country: France
- Region: Auvergne-Rhône-Alpes
- Department: Haute-Savoie
- Arrondissement: Saint-Julien-en-Genevois
- Canton: Saint-Julien-en-Genevois
- Intercommunality: CC du Genevois

Government
  - Mayor (2020–2026): Laurent Chevalier
- Area^{1}: 26.16 km^{2} (10.10 sq mi)
- Elevation: 503 m (1,650 ft)
- Highest elevation: 755 m (2,477 ft)
- Lowest elevation: 357 m (1,171 ft)
- Population (2023): 5,809
  - Density: 222.1/km^{2} (575.1/sq mi)
- Time zone: UTC+01:00 (CET)
  - Summer (DST): UTC+02:00 (CEST)
- INSEE/Postal code: 74309 /74580
- ^{1} French Land Register data, which excludes lakes, ponds, glaciers > 1 km^{2} (0.386 sq mi or 247 acres) and river estuaries.

Viry (French pronunciation: [viʁi]; Savoyard: Vry) is a commune in the Haute-Savoie department in the Auvergne-Rhône-Alpes region in south-eastern France.

== History ==
Viry is the birthplace of Justin de Viry, a Sardinian and French diplomat and politician. He is still the only Savoyard to be buried in the Panthéon. During the World War, Viry was one of the border towns with Switzerland through which many Jews fleeing Nazism passed.

== Population ==
Historical population
Year	Pop.	±% p.a.
1968	1,218	—
1975	1,561	+3.61%
1982	2,023	+3.77%
1990	2,550	+2.94%
1999	3,032	+1.94%
2007	3,423	+1.53%
2012	3,909	+2.69%
2017	5,182	+5.80%
2023	5,809	+1.92%
Source: INSEE

== See also ==
- Communes of the Haute-Savoie department
