= Court-Saint-Étienne =

Municipality in Walloon Brabant province, Wallonia, Belgium

- Municipality
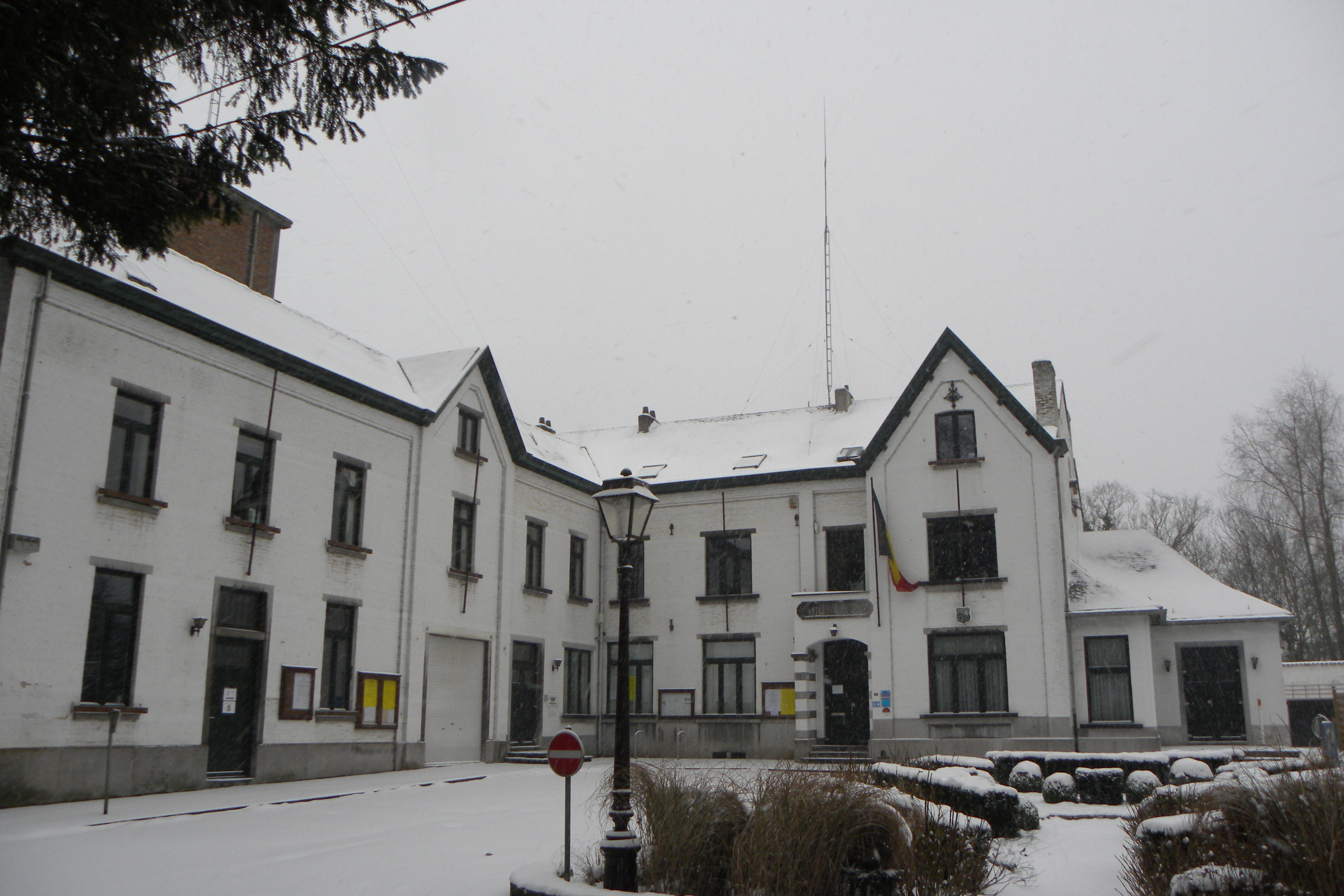
- Court-St-Etienne town hall

- Flag Coat of arms

- The municipality of Court-Saint-Étienne in Walloon Brabant
- Interactive map of Court-Saint-Étienne
- Location in Belgium
- Coordinates: 50°38′N 04°34′E
- Country: Belgium
- Community: French Community
- Region: Wallonia
- Province: Walloon Brabant
- Arrondissement: Nivelles

Government
  - Mayor: Michaël Goblet d'Alviella (MR)
  - Governing party: Liste du Maïeur

Area
  - Total: 26.88 km^{2} (10.38 sq mi)

Population (2018-01-01)
  - Total: 10,500
  - Density: 391/km^{2} (1,010/sq mi)
- Postal codes: 1490
- NIS code: 25023
- Area codes: 010
- Website: www.court-st-etienne.be

Court-Saint-Étienne (French pronunciation: [kuʁ sɛ̃.t‿etjɛn]; Walloon: Coû-Sint-Stiene) is a municipality of Wallonia located in the Belgian province of Walloon Brabant. On 1 January 2006 Court-Saint-Étienne had a total population of 9,408. The total area is 26.64 km^{2} (10.29 sq mi) which gives a population density of 353/km^{2} (910/sq mi) inhabitants .

The municipality includes the following districts: Wisterzée, Sart-Messire-Guillaume, La Roche, Mérivaux, Suzeril, Faux, Limauges, Beaurieux, Franquenies, Le Chenoy, and Tangissart.

== Sports ==
Court-Saint-Étienne is home to Royal Excelsior Stéphanois football club.

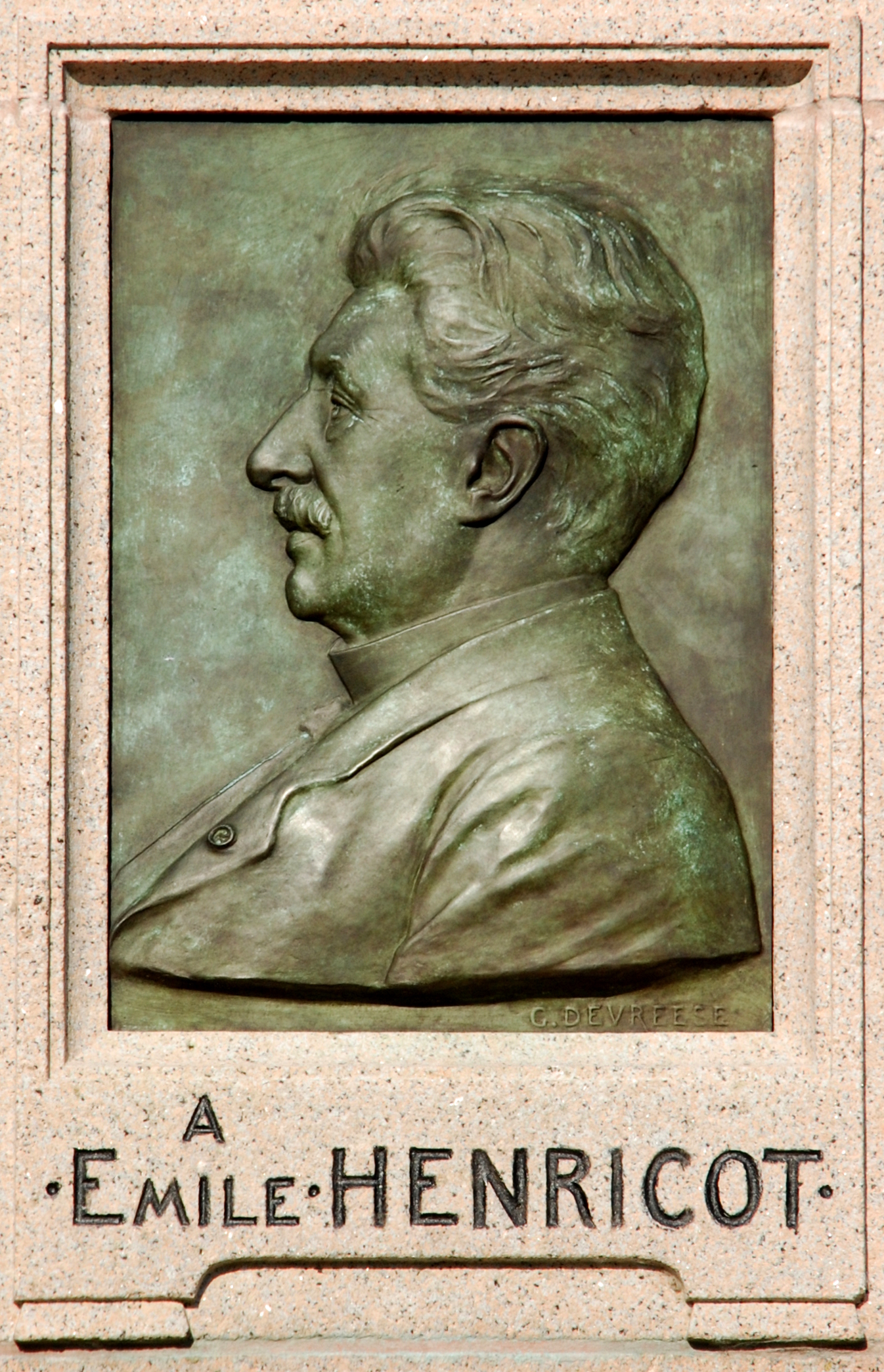
Émile Henricot Monument
in Court-Saint-Étienne
