= Glossary of European Union concepts, acronyms, and jargon =

European Union (EU) concepts, acronyms, and jargon are a terminology set that has developed as a form of shorthand, to quickly express a (formal) EU process, an (informal) institutional working practice, or an EU body, function or decision, and which is commonly understood among EU officials or external people who regularly deal with EU institutions.

== The European Union executive institutions ==
=== European Council ===
==== Accession Treaty ====
The Treaty of Accession 1972 was the agreement between the European Communities and four countries (Denmark, Ireland, Norway and the United Kingdom) concerning their accession to the EC. It was signed on 22 January 1972 and Denmark, Ireland and the United Kingdom became full member states on 1 January 1973 following the ratification procedures. Norway did not ratify the treaty after it was rejected in a referendum held in September 1972.

The Treaty of Accession 1979 was the agreement between the European Communities and Greece concerning its accession to the EC. It was signed on 28 May 1979 and Greece became a full member state on 1 January 1981 following the ratification procedure.

The Treaty of Accession 1985 was the agreement between the European Communities and two countries (Spain and Portugal) concerning their accession to the EC. It was signed on 12 June 1985 and Spain and Portugal became full member states on 1 January 1986 following the ratification procedures.

The Treaty of Accession 1994 was the agreement between the European Union and four countries (Austria, Finland, Sweden and Norway) concerning their accession to the EU. It was signed on 26 July 1994 and Austria, Finland and Sweden became full member states on 1 January 1995 following the ratification procedures. Norway again failed to join because its referendum did not pass.

The Treaty of Accession 2003 was the agreement between the European Union and the ten countries (Czech Republic, Estonia, Cyprus, Latvia, Lithuania, Hungary, Malta, Poland, Slovenia, Slovakia), concerning their accession into the EU. It was signed on 16 April 2003 and they became full member states on 1 May 2004 following the ratification procedures.

The Treaty of Accession 2005 was the agreement between the European Union and two countries (Bulgaria and Romania) concerning their accession to the EU. It was signed on 25 April 2005 and they became full member states on 1 January 2007 following the ratification procedures.

The Treaty of Accession 2011 was the agreement between the European Union and Croatia concerning its accession to the EU. It was signed on 9 December 2011 and Croatia became a full member state on 1 January 2013 following the ratification procedure.

==== Copenhagen criteria ====
The Copenhagen criteria are the rules that define whether a country is eligible to join the European Union. The criteria require that a state have the institutions to preserve democratic governance and human rights, a functioning market economy, and that the state accept the obligations and intent of the EU.

==== Dublin Convention ====
An inter-governmental agreement between EU member states on asylum, obliging the country in which an asylum seeker arrives to handle the application for asylum on behalf of all other member states. The objective was to prevent asylum seekers from launching multiple asylum requests. The agreement was reached in 1990 but became binding only in 1997.

==== European Conference ====
The European Conference was the name of the meeting that brought together 10 countries aspiring to join the EU. It met for the first time in London on 12 March 1998, then in Luxembourg on 6 October 1998 and then finally in Brussels on 19 July 1999.

==== Fouchet Plan ====
The Fouchet Plan was drawn up by Christian Fouchet as Charles De Gaulle's unofficial spokesman for European affairs. The Fouchet Plan aimed at restructuring the European Community into a voluntary union of member states with a new headquarters in Paris, and by subjecting EU law to national law. The rejection of the Fouchet Plan by the other 5 member states had far-reaching consequences, such as the vetoing of the UK's entry into the EU, the empty chair crisis, and the Luxembourg compromise.

==== Helsinki six ====
The Helsinki European Council in December 1999 authorised accession negotiations with six candidate countries: Bulgaria, Latvia, Lithuania, Malta, Romania and Slovakia. These countries are therefore known as the "Helsinki six".

==== Ioannina Compromise ====
An informal meeting of foreign ministers held in Ioannina, Greece, on 29 March 1994, which discussed Council decision making and the national veto. The Treaty of Nice has since put an end to what was agreed in the Ioannina compromise.

==== ISPA ====
The Instrument for Structural Policies for Pre-Accession (ISPA) was created by the Berlin European Council of March 1999 for increasing pre-accession aid in the field of transport and environment to European Union accession candidate countries.

==== Luxembourg compromise ====
The Luxembourg compromise was a compromise (not recognised by the European Commission nor the European Court of Justice) that extended the lifespan of the national veto beyond what was foreseen in the Treaty of Rome. It originated from the "empty chair crisis" instigated by President De Gaulle, and its effect was that Qualified Majority Voting was used far less often and Unanimity became the norm.

==== Luxembourg six ====
The Luxembourg European Council in December 1997 authorised accession negotiations with six candidate countries: Cyprus, Estonia, Hungary, Poland, the Czech Republic and Slovenia. These countries are therefore known as the "Luxembourg six".

==== Merger Treaty ====
The Merger Treaty, signed in Brussels on 8 April 1965 and in force from 1 July 1967, provided for a single Commission and a single Council of the then three European Communities (European Coal and Steel Community, European Economic Community and Euratom).

==== PHARE ====
The Poland and Hungary: Assistance for Restructuring their Economies (PHARE) programme was created in 1989 to assist Poland and Hungary in their preparations for joining the European Union.

==== SAPARD ====
The Special Accession Programme for Agriculture and Rural Development (SAPARD) was established by the Berlin European Council in March 1999 to aid the countries of central and eastern Europe in the areas of agricultural and rural development. It supplemented the PHARE program.

==== Schengen Agreement ====
The Schengen Agreement, dealing with cross-border legal arrangements and the abolition of systematic border controls among the participating countries, was created independently of the European Union. However, the Treaty of Amsterdam incorporated the developments brought about by the agreement into the European Union framework, effectively making the agreement part of the EU.

=== European Commission ===
The European Commission is independent of national governments and its job is to represent and uphold the interests of the European Union as a whole. It drafts proposals for new European laws, which it presents to the European Parliament and the Council.

It is also the EU's executive arm, responsible for implementing the decisions of Parliament and the council, implementing its policies, running its programmes and spending its funds. Like the Parliament and Council, the European Commission was set up in the 1950s under the EU's founding treaties.

==== ACP ====
African, Caribbean and Pacific countries (ACP), beneficiaries of the European Development Fund (EDF).

==== Agenda 2000 ====
A framework presented by the European Commission (July 1997) for the development of the European Union and its policies (especially concerning enlargement and the financial framework) after the year 2000.

==== Acquis Communautaire ====
The body of Community law, as well as all acts adopted under the second and third pillars of the European Union and the common objectives laid down in the Treaties.

==== CFCU ====
The Central Financing and Contracting Unit (CFCU) is a body setup in all enlargement candidate countries for the administration of budgets, tendering, contracts, payments, accounting and financial reporting of all procurement contracts for EU funded programmes. It is a body of the government of the candidate country, and not of the European Commission. However, the EC representation in the candidate country receives regular reports on its activities.

==== Checchini Report ====
In 1988, a study called "The Costs of Non-Europe" was commissioned to evaluate the gains achieved from creating the European Single Market, and since known as the "Checchini Report". Although its growth projections were too optimistic, it nevertheless predicted that the single market would be a great success.

==== Competence ====
See Subsidiarity (European Union)#EU competences

==== ECSC ====
The European Coal and Steel Community (ECSC) was founded by the Treaty of Paris (1951). Its members were France, West Germany, Italy, Belgium, Luxembourg and the Netherlands who pooled their steel and coal resources and create a common market for those products. It was the predecessor of the European Communities. The ECSC was abolished in 2002.

==== Élysée Treaty ====
The Élysée Treaty also known as the Treaty of Friendship, was concluded by Charles de Gaulle and Konrad Adenauer in 1963, and established a process of reconciliation for ending the rivalry between France and Germany.

==== EDF ====
The European Development Fund is the main instrument for European Community aid for development cooperation in the African, Caribbean and Pacific countries, as well as the Overseas Countries and Territories (OCT).

==== Europe Agreement ====
Europe Agreement is the common name of the Accession Agreement that implies prospects for EU membership.

==== de Larosière report ====
The de Larosière report, issued by a panel led by the former French central banker Jacques de Larosière, calls for an overhaul of Europe's financial-regulation system. It proposes the creation of a regional supervisor, the European Systemic Risk Council, which would be led by the president of the European Central Bank and include central bankers from across Europe and some national regulators. The report was ordered by the European Commission President Jose Manuel Barroso and was issued in February 2009.

==== Messina Conference ====
The Messina Conference was held in Messina, Italy, in 1955 and discussed the subject of a customs union. The conference entrusted Paul-Henri Spaak with the creation of a report that eventually led to the creation of 1957 Treaty of Rome.

==== OCT ====
Overseas Countries and Territories (OCT), beneficiaries of the European Development Fund (EDF).

==== PSD, PSD2 ====
An EU Directive, administered by the European Commission (Directorate General Internal Market) to regulate payment services and payment service providers throughout the European Union (EU) and European Economic Area (EEA).

==== Rome Treaty ====
The Treaties of Rome established the European Economic Community (EEC) and the European Atomic Energy Community (EURATOM) and were signed in Rome on 25 March 1957 by the six founding members: Belgium, France, Italy, Luxembourg, the Netherlands and West Germany. They entered into force on 1 January 1958.

==== Safeguard Clause ====
A rapid reaction measure which can be invoked by a Member State whenever a new member state would fail to live up to its obligations in the areas of the internal market or justice and home affairs.

==== Single European Act ====
The Single European Act (SEA) was the first major revision of the Treaty of Rome establishing ECC, and aimed at creating the Single European Market by 31 December 1992.

==== Stuttgart Declaration ====
The Stuttgart Declaration was the solemn declaration calling for the creation of the European Union and signed by the then 10 heads of state and governments on 19 June 1983.

==== Subsidiarity ====
The principle of subsidiarity in the European Union is that decisions are retained by Member States if the intervention of the European Union is not necessary. The European Union takes action collectively only when Member States' power is insufficient. The principle of subsidiarity applied to the European Union can be summarised as "Europe where necessary, national where possible".

== The European Union legislative institutions ==
=== European Parliament ===
The European Parliament is the only directly elected body of the European Union, with elections every five years. Its main meetings are held in Brussels, with plenary sessions in Strasbourg. The Parliament has MEPs from the 27 Member States and, along with the Council, it considers legislative proposals from the European Commission. The Parliament and Council also share joint responsibility for approving the EU's annual budget. The Parliament has the power to dismiss the European Commission, and it appoints the European Ombudsman.

==== COSAC ====
The Conference of Parliamentary Committees for Union Affairs was proposed by the French National Assembly and has met every 6 months since 1989. It consists of representatives of the committees of the national parliaments dealing with European Union affairs and 6 MEPs, and is headed by two vice-presidents responsible for relations with the national parliaments. It discusses the major topics of European integration. COSAC is not a decision-making body.

==== Quaestor ====
An advisory member of the Bureau of the European Parliament. The Parliament elects five Quaestors for a two and a half-year term.

==== Quorum ====
A quorum exists when at least one-third of the Members of the Parliament are present in the chamber.

==== Standing Committee ====
The European Parliament has 23 standing committees:

- AFET – Foreign Affairs
- DEVE – Development
- INTA – International Trade
- BUDG – Budgets
- CONT – Budgetary Control
- ECON – Economic and Monetary Affairs
- EMPL – Employment and Social Affairs
- ENVI – Environment, Public Health and Food Safety
- ITRE – Industry, Research and Energy
- IMCO – Internal Market and Consumer Protection
- TRAN – Transport and Tourism
- REGI – Regional Development
- AGRI – Agricultural and Rural Development
- PECH – Fisheries
- CULT – Culture and Education
- JURI – Legal Affairs
- LIBE – Civil Liberties, Justice and Home Affairs
- AFCO – Constitutional Affairs
- FEMM – Women's Rights and Gender Equality
- PETI – Petitions
- DROI – Human Rights
- SEDE – Security and Defence
- EQUI – Crisis of the Equitable Life Assurance Society

Since the adoption of the Maastricht Treaty, temporary Committees of Inquiry may also be set up by a vote of Parliament (e.g., on Climate Change, transport, BSE, Echelon, Human Genetics, Safety at Sea).

==== STOA ====
The Parliament's Science and Technology Options Assessment unit, whose work is carried out in partnership with external experts.

==== Tindemans report ====
A report written in 1975 by the former Belgian Prime Minister Leo Tindemans. Notably, the report contained proposals for direct elections to the European Parliament, the Monetary Union and the Common Foreign and Security policy.

=== Council of the European Union ===
The Council of Ministers comprises the representatives of each of the 27 member states at Ministerial level, chaired by the President. The work of the council is prepared by the two Corepers – the Committee of Permanent Representatives (Coreper II), and the Committee of Deputy Permanent Representatives (Coreper I). Their work is in turn prepared by various working groups, working parties and committees.

==== A Points ====
Also known as 'A Items', these are items of business and decisions which the Council of Ministers adopts without discussion because they have already been prepared by working groups, Coreper, and in some cases another configuration of the council. They may cover issues unrelated to the Council itself e.g. Health and Safety 'A' points can be passed by the Fisheries Council. This is because the council is indivisible.

==== Antici ====
The Antici Group (named after its Italian founder) is made up of representatives of the Permanent Representatives, the European Commission, the General Secretariat of the Council and the European External Action Service, and a member of the Council Legal Service. The Group is responsible for deciding on the organisation of Coreper II proceedings. The meeting, which usually takes place on the morning of the day before Coreper, is chaired by the 'Antici' Presidency.

Members of the Antici Group also take notes of the discussions by heads of state or government at European Council meetings.

==== Article 133 Committee ====
The "Article 133" committee was set up in the area of the common commercial policy. Since the entry into force of the Lisbon Treaty it has been known as the Trade Policy Committee. After authorisation by the council, the commission is authorised to negotiate conclusions on trade policy with states or international organisations. During such negotiations, the Commission consults the Trade Policy Committee.

==== Article 36 Committee (CATS) ====
This committee was set up by Article 36 of the EU Treaty, and co-ordinates police and judicial cooperation in criminal matters. Additionally, it submits opinions to the council and contributes to the preparation of Council work. It is now officially known as the Coordinating Committee in the area of police and judicial cooperation in criminal matters.

==== B Points ====
These are the agenda items which the council will discuss. 'Starred B points' are ones where a vote may be taken. 'False B points' are agenda items which would otherwise be 'A points' except that one or more delegations wish to make a statement in the meeting.

==== CARDS ====
The Community Assistance for Reconstruction, Development, and Stabilisation (CARDS) programme is the EU's main instrument of financial assistance to the Western Balkans, and was created in 2000 by Council Regulation 2666/2000.

==== EFC ====
The Economic and Financial Committee (EFC) was introduced with the Maastricht Treaty as part of the EMU (Economic and Monetary Union), and is a committee of senior representatives of member states' finance ministries and central banks, plus representatives of the ECB and the commission. The EFC prepares the work of the Economic and Financial Affairs (ECOFIN) Council, in particular regarding excessive deficit procedures and issues related to the euro. The EFC meets in different compositions according to subjects, and select issues are prepared for the EFC by the alternate members.

==== EPC ====
The Economic Policy Committee (EPC) was set up in 1974 and is made up of representatives of the Member States, the ECB and the commission. The EPC contributes to the work of the Economic and Financial Affairs (ECOFIN) Council as regards the coordination of Member State and Community economic policies. The EPC also provides the commission and the council with advice in this area, focusing particularly on structural reforms. The EPC features a number of sub-working groups on issues such as the economic consequences of ageing etc.

==== ECOFIN ====
The Economic and Financial Affairs (ECOFIN) Council is composed of the Economics and Finance Ministers of the 27 European Union member states, as well as Budget Ministers when budgetary issues are discussed.

==== Mertens Group ====
The Mertens Group fulfils the same role as Antici for Coreper I (Deputies). It was established in 1993.

==== Population Filter ====
For a decision taken by a qualified majority, any country can ask the council to check that the countries in favour represent at least 62% of the total EU population.

== The European Union judicial institutions ==
=== ECJ ===
The Court of Justice ensures that EU law is interpreted and applied in the same way in all EU countries, and that the law is equal for everyone. For example, it provides a check on that national courts do not give different rulings on the same issue. The Court also ensures that EU member states and institutions do what the law requires them to do. The Court is located in Luxembourg and has one judge from each member country.

==== Bosmans case ====
In the Bosmans case (Case C-415/93, 15 December 1995), the Court ruled against the application of transfer rules between football clubs (in EU member states) after the contract for the player has expired. The Court also ruled against quotas for non-nationals within football teams in EU member states.

==== Casagrande case ====
In the Casagrande case (Case 9/74, 3 July 1974), the Court ruled that discrimination against persons in the educational system was illegal. Prior to this ruling, education was not considered covered by the European Treaties.

==== Homestate regulation ====
Homestate regulation is a term used in EU law for cross-border selling or marketing of goods and services. The ruling states that even if a company sells goods or services into the market of another European country, the company is bound only by the laws of the country where it is based, and will thus not have to be aware of the national laws in all the EU member states.

==== Kupferberg case ====
In the Kupferberg case (Case 104/81, 26 October 1982), the Court ruled that free trade agreements are directly applicable in all EU member states, and therefore automatically have primacy over national law.

==== Marleasing case ====
In the Marleasing case (Case C-106/89, 13 November 1990, and C-91/92, 14 July 1994) the Court ruled that EU member states must interpret national legislation according to EU directives, even if the directives have not yet been incorporated into the legal code of the country.

==== Preliminary ruling ====
This is the procedure by which a national court, when in doubt about the interpretation or validity of an EU law, should (or must) ask the Court of Justice for advice.

== The European Union auditing institutions ==
=== European Court of Auditors ===
The European Court of Auditors is a body (rather than a true court) established somewhat belatedly after the realisation that, given the huge size of funds circulating within the EU, some oversight was needed to avoid corruption and misuse of money. In particular, the Great Sicilian Olive Scandal (where satellite photos revealed that there were far fewer Sicilian olive trees than the number of olive tree subsidy claims) spurred the setting up of this body.

== The European Union financial institutions ==
=== European Central Bank ===
See European Central Bank

==== EMS ====
The European Monetary System (EMS) was an arrangement established in 1979 under the Jenkins European Commission where most nations in the European Economic Community (EEC) linked their currencies to prevent large fluctuations relative to one another.

==== Werner Plan ====
At the European Summit in The Hague in 1969, the Heads of State and Government of the EC agreed to prepare a plan for the creation of an economic and monetary union. In October 1970 the Werner Report was presented, drawn up by a working group chaired by Luxembourg's president and Minister for the Treasury, Pierre Werner. However, for several reasons, the monetary union failed at this stage, mainly due to 1973 oil crisis.

=== European Investment Bank Group institutions ===
The European Investment Bank Group (EIB Group) consists of

- the European Investment Bank (EIB) - the European Union's nonprofit long-term lending institution established in 1958 under the Treaty of Rome. As a "policy-driven bank" whose shareholders are the member states of the EU, the EIB uses its financing operations to bring about European integration and social cohesion. It should not be confused with the European Central Bank.
- the European Investment Fund
- the EIB Institute

The EIB Group is a publicly owned international financial group. As the shareholders of its parent institution (the EIB), the EU member states set the group's broad policy goals and oversee the two principal decision-making bodies of the EIB: the board of governors and the board of directors.

== Advisory bodies ==
=== EESC ===
The European Economic and Social Committee is a consultative body of the European Union (EU) established in 1958. It is an advisory assembly composed of "social partners", namely: employers (employers' organisations), employees (trade unions) and representatives of various other interests. Its seat, which it shares with the Committee of the Regions, is the Jacques Delors building on 99 Rue Belliard in Brussels.

Once known by the acronym "EcoSoc", the body is now referred to as the "EESC", to avoid confusions with the United Nations ECOSOC. The European Conservatives and Reformists argue that the EESC has outlived its usefulness and should be dismantled.

=== CoR ===
The European Committee of the Regions is the EU assembly of local and regional representatives that provides sub-national authorities (i.e. regions, counties, provinces, municipalities and cities) with a direct voice within the EU's institutional framework. Established in 1994, the CoR was set up to acknowledge the significance of the regions, some of which, such as Andalusia, are larger than some Member States, e.g., Malta or Luxembourg.

== Inter-institutional bodies ==
=== Ombudsman ===
The European Ombudsman investigates complaints about maladministration in the institutions and bodies of the European Union. The Ombudsman is completely independent and impartial. The current Ombudsman is Ms Emily O'Reilly. O'Reilly was appointed European Ombudsman by the European Parliament in 2013. She was re-appointed in 2014 and 2019. Her current term expires in December 2024. The Parliament elected the first European Ombudsman in 1995.

=== Office for Official Publications of the European Communities ===
The Office for Official Publications of the European Communities (Publications Office) is the publishing house of the European Union (EU).

==== OJ ====
The Official Journal (OJ) of the European Union is published daily in more than 21 languages. The Publications Office also publishes a range of other titles, both on paper and electronically, on the activities and policies of the European Union.

=== EPSO ===
The European Personnel Selection Office (EPSO) is a recruitment office for the European Civil Service. It was created on 26 July 2002, beginning work in 2003, to organise open competitions for highly skilled positions within EU institutions such as the European Commission, Parliament, Council.

=== European Administrative School ===
The European Administrative School (EAS) came into existence on 10 February 2005. Its aim is to promote cooperation between European Union institutions in the area of training, to support the spread of common values and harmonised professional practices, and to create synergies in the use of human and financial resources.

== Decentralised bodies (agencies, independent bodies and joint undertakings) ==
An agency, an independent body or a joint undertaking, are decentralised EU or Euratom bodies distinct from the EU institutions (Council, Parliament, Commission, etc.) and the EU advisory bodies, governed by the European public law. Each of them has its own juridical personality granted by the EU law. They are typically set up by an act of secondary legislation to deal with a specified narrower field, or to accomplish a very specific technical, scientific or managerial task. They include:

- decentralised EU agencies
  - so-called community agencies (formerly known as agencies under the First Pillar)
  - Common Foreign and Security Policy agencies (formerly known as agencies under the Second Pillar)
  - Area of Freedom, Security and Justice agencies (formerly known as agencies under the Third Pillar)
- executive EU agencies
- Euratom agencies
- five independent bodies of the EU
- joint undertakings
  - of the EU
  - of the Euratom

== Common Foreign and Security Policy ==
=== Common Position ===
The legal instruments used by the council for the CFSP are different from the legislative acts. Under the CFSP they consist of "common positions", "joint actions" and "common strategies".

=== Common Strategies ===
The legal instruments used by the council for the CFSP are different from the legislative acts. Under the CFSP they consist of "common positions", "joint actions" and "common strategies".

=== CSDP ===
The Common Security and Defence Policy (CSDP), formerly the European Security and Defence Policy (ESDP), is a major element of the Common Foreign and Security Policy pillar of the European Union (EU). The CSDP is the successor of the ESDI under NATO, but differs in that it falls under the jurisdiction of the European Union itself, including countries with no ties to NATO.

=== EDC ===
The European Defence Community (EDC) was a plan proposed in 1950 by René Pleven, the French Prime Minister, in response to the American call for the rearmament of West Germany. The intention was to form a pan-European defence force as an alternative to Germany's proposed accession to NATO, meant to harness its military potential in case of conflict with the Soviet bloc. The EDC was to include West Germany, France, Italy, and the Benelux countries. A treaty was signed on 27 May 1952, but the plan never went into effect.

=== ESDP ===
See CSDP

=== EUMC ===
The European Union Military Committee (EUMC) is a department of military officials under the High Representative for the Common Foreign and Security Policy and the Political and Security Committee (PSC) of the European Union's Common Foreign and Security Policy. The EUMC gives military advice to the PSC and the high representative. It also oversees the European Union Military Staff. (Not to be confused with the former racism monitoring centre, also EUMC, now subsumed into the Fundamental Rights Agency.)

=== EUMS ===
The European Union Military Staff (EUMS) is a department of the European Union, responsible for supervising operations within the realm of the Common Security and Defence Policy. It is directly attached to the private office of the High Representative of the Common Foreign and Security Policy, currently Josep Borrell, and is formally part of the General Secretariat of the Council of the European Union.

=== FAC ===
The Foreign Affairs Council is a formation of the Council of the European Union which discusses foreign affairs matters. It also meets in different sub-formations, such as Defence, Development, or Trade, when discussing specific issues.

=== GAERC ===
The General Affairs and External Relations Council (GAERC) used to be a formation of the Council of the European Union. It has now been split into two formations: the General Affairs Council (GAC) and the Foreign Affairs Council (FAC)

=== Joint Action ===
The legal instruments used by the council for the CFSP are different from the legislative acts. Under the CFSP they consist of "common positions", "joint actions" and "common strategies".

=== Pleven Plan ===
The Pleven Plan was a plan proposed in 1950 by the French premier at the time, René Pleven, to create a supranational European Army as part of a European Defence Community.

=== PSC ===
A Political and Security Committee (PSC) monitors the international situation in the areas covered by the Common Foreign and Security Policy and contributes by delivering opinions to the Council of Ministers, either at its request or its own initiative, and also monitors the implementation of agreed policies. It is supported by the Political-Military Group (PMG)

== International relations ==
=== Third country ===
Third country is the term officially used in EU legislation to refer to a country that is not an EU member, but it is often used more generally to refer to countries that are neither EU member states nor members of the European Economic Area.

=== Twin towns – Sister cities ===
Twinning is the secondment of experts from the European Union institutions to a member state. This is especially used in enlargement matters, to help the candidate member state to acquire the structures, human resources and management skills needed to implement the 'acquis communautaire'.

==== Yaoundé Convention ====
The Yaoundé Convention, and Association Agreement valid for 5 years, was signed in Yaoundé, Cameroon in 1963, between the European Community and 17 African States and Madagascar.

== See also ==
=== Organisations that are not part of the European Union institutions, bodies or agencies ===
==== Council of Europe ====
The Council of Europe (CoE) is not related to the European Union (EU). For the two EU institutions that go by similar names, see the Council of the European Union (known as "the Council") and the European Council. The Council of Europe (French: Conseil de l'Europe) is the oldest international organisation working towards European integration, being founded in 1949. It has a particular emphasis on legal standards, human rights, democratic development, the rule of law and cultural co-operation.

==== EFTA ====
The European Free Trade Association (EFTA) is a European trade bloc which was established on 3 May 1960 as an alternative for European states who were either unable to, or chose not to, join the then-European Economic Community (now the European Union). Today only Iceland, Norway, Switzerland, and Liechtenstein remain members of EFTA (of which only Norway and Switzerland are founding members). Three of the EFTA countries are part of the European Union Internal Market through the Agreement on a European Economic Area (EEA), which took effect in 1994; the fourth, Switzerland, opted to conclude bilateral agreements with the EU.

==== European Court of Human Rights ====
The European Court of Human Rights also known as the Strasbourg Court, is an international court of the Council of Europe which interprets the European Convention on Human Rights. The court hears applications alleging that a contracting state has breached one or more of the human rights enumerated in the convention or its optional protocols to which a member state is a party. The European Convention on Human Rights is also referred to by the initials "ECHR". The court is based in Strasbourg, France.

==== OSCE ====
The Organization for Security and Co-operation in Europe (OCSE) is the world's largest security-oriented intergovernmental organisation. Its mandate includes issues such as arms control, human rights, freedom of the press, and fair elections. The OSCE is an ad hoc organisation under the United Nations Charter (Chap. VIII). The EU is not strictly speaking a member of the OCSE, although the Commission president Jacques Delors signed the Charter of Paris for a New Europe (1990), which is the origin of the OCSE.

==== The Nordic Council ====
The Nordic Council is an advisory body to the Nordic parliaments and governments, established in 1953, dealing with economic, legislative, social, cultural, environmental and communication policies.

=== Related articles ===
- Bodies of the European Union
  - Institutions of the European Union
  - Advisory bodies to the European Union
  - Agencies, independent bodies and joint undertakings of the European Union and the Euratom
