= Bodies of the European Union and Euratom =

The main bodies of the European Union and Euratom are:

- the seven principal institutions of the European Union, established through primary legislation (treaties), including an international entity (the European Central Bank);
- other bodies of the EU established through primary legislation, either as international law bodies (the European Investment Bank Group entities, the European University Institute, the European Stability Mechanism and the Unified Patent Court) or as bodies without juridical personality (the European Ombudsman and the advisory bodies to the European Union);
- agencies, decentralised independent bodies and joint undertakings of the European Union and Euratom, established through secondary legislation with juridical personality;
- other bodies of the EU established through secondary legislation without juridical personality, such as the European Data Protection Supervisor; and
- inter-institutional services.

== Institutions and bodies ==
=== Institutions ===
The Treaty on European Union in Article 13 lists seven institutions of the European Union, including one which is an international entity (the European Central Bank).

Logo	Name	TEU	Seat	Members	Chairperson
European Parliament logo	The European Parliament	1	Strasbourg	720 MEPs	(Malta) Roberta Metsola
Council of the EU and European Council	The European Council	2	Brussels	27 Heads of State or Government of the Member States and the President of the Commission	(Portugal) António Costa
Council of the EU and European Council	The Council of the European Union	3	Brussels	27 ministers	Biannual rotation; currently (Republic of Ireland) Ireland
	The European Commission	4	Brussels	27 commissioners	(Germany) Ursula von der Leyen
	The Court of Justice of the European Union	5	Luxembourg	27 judges, 11 Advocate-Generals	(Belgium) Koen Lenaerts
	The European Central Bank	6	Frankfurt am Main		(France) Christine Lagarde
	The European Court of Auditors	7	Luxembourg	27 members, 1 president	(Republic of Ireland) Tony Murphy

=== External policy body ===
The European External Action Service, (EEAS) headed by the High Representative of the Union for Foreign Affairs and Security Policy, is a separately established body responsible for the external policy of the Union.

=== Consultative bodies ===
There are a number of other bodies and agencies of note that are not formal institutions. There are two consultative committees to the EU institutions: the Economic and Social Committee (EESC) advises on economic and social policy (principally relations between workers and employers) being made up of representatives of various industries and work sectors. Its 344 members (with an additional nine members joining following the accession of Croatia to the EU), appointed by the council for four-year terms, are organised into three fairly equal groups representing employers, employees and other various interests; while the European Committee of the Regions (CoR) is composed of representative of regional and local authorities who hold an electoral mandate. It advises on regional issues. It has 344 members, organised in political groups, appointed every four years by the council.

=== Other bodies ===
The other bodies are:

- the European Investment Bank (EIB) (including the European Investment Fund);
- the European Ombudsman;
- the European Data Protection Supervisor (EDPS);
- the European Data Protection Board (EDPB);
- the European Public Prosecutor's Office (EPPO);
- and the European Cybersecurity Industrial, Technology and Research Competence Centre (ECCC).

The European Data Protection Supervisor ensures the institutions respect citizens' privacy rights in relation to data processing.

== Interinstitutional services ==
The interinstitutional services of the European Union are administratively attached to the European Commission. They lack juridical personality. Alongside the Cybersecurity Service for the Union Institutions, Bodies, Offices and Agencies (CERT-EU), they include the Publications Office (OP), the oldest one, which publishes and distributes official publications from the European Union bodies; and the two relatively new: the European Personnel Selection Office (EPSO), a recruitment body which organises competitions for posts within Union institutions; and the European Administrative School (EuSA), which provides specific training for the staff of Union institutions.

== Decentralised agencies ==
The decentralised agencies are created by a specific legislative act and charged with a particular task.

These are:

- the Agency for Support for BEREC (BEREC Office);
- the Authority for Anti-Money Laundering and Countering the Financing of Terrorism (AMLA);
- the Community Plant Variety Office (CPVO);
- the European Agency for Safety and Health at Work (EU-OSHA);
- the European Banking Authority (EBA);
- the European Border and Coast Guard Agency (Frontex);
- the European Centre for Disease Prevention and Control (ECDC);
- the European Centre for the Development of Vocational Training (Cedefop);
- the European Chemicals Agency (ECHA);
- the European Environment Agency (EEA);
- the European Fisheries Control Agency (EFCA);
- the European Food Safety Authority (EFSA);
- the European Foundation for the Improvement of Living and Working Conditions (Eurofound);
- the European Institute for Gender Equality (EIGE);
- the European Insurance and Occupational Pensions Authority (EIOPA);
- the European Labour Authority (ELA);
- the European Maritime Safety Agency (EMSA);
- the European Medicines Agency (EMA);
- the European Securities and Markets Authority (ESMA);
- the European Training Foundation (ETF);
- the European Union Agency for Asylum (EUAA);
- the European Union Agency for Criminal Justice Cooperation (Eurojust);
- the European Union Agency for Cybersecurity (ENISA);
- the European Union Agency for Fundamental Rights (FRA);
- the European Union Agency for Law Enforcement Cooperation (Europol);
- the European Union Agency for Law Enforcement Training (CEPOL);
- the European Union Agency for Railways (ERA);
- the European Union Agency for the Cooperation of Energy Regulators (ACER);
- the European Union Agency for the Operational Management of Large-Scale IT Systems in the Area of Freedom, Security and Justice (eu-LISA);
- the European Union Agency for the Space Programme (EUSPA);
- the European Union Aviation Safety Agency (EASA);
- the European Union Drugs Agency (EUDA);
- the European Union Intellectual Property Office (EUIPO);
- the Single Resolution Board (SRB);
- the Translation Centre for the Bodies of the European Union (CdT).

== Common foreign and security policy agencies and bodies ==
The following agencies and bodies are established by the Council within the context of the common foreign and security policy: the European Defence Agency (EDA), the European Security and Defence College (ESDC), the European Union Institute for Security Studies (EUISS) and the European Union Satellite Centre (Satcen).

== Executive agencies ==
In accordance with Council Regulation (EC) No 58/2003, the executive agencies are established as legal entities with a view to being entrusted with certain tasks relating to the management of one or more European Union programmes. These agencies are set up for a fixed period. These include CINEA, EACEA, HaDEA, Eismea, ERCEA and REA.

== Euratom agencies and bodies ==
Certain Euratom agencies and bodies, created to support the aims of the European Atomic Energy Community Treaty, now form a part of the administrative structure of the European Union. These are the Euratom Supply Agency (ESA) and the European Joint Undertaking for ITER and the Development of Fusion Energy (F4E).

== International law entities of the EU (other than ECB) ==
=== European Investment Bank Group bodies ===
In addition, the European Investment Bank is the European Union's long-term lending institution. The EIB supports the EU's priority objectives, especially boosting sustainable growth and job creation. The Group also includes the European Investment Fund and the EIB Institute.

== Other organisations ==
Established by Regulation 1141/2014, the Authority for European Political Parties and European Political Foundations (APPF) is in charge of registering, controlling and imposing sanctions on European political parties and European political foundations.

== See also ==
- Glossary of European Union concepts, acronyms, and jargon
- List of the names of bodies of the European Union in its official languages
