= Institutions of the European Union =

Decision-making bodies of the European Union

Alternative chart of the political system. The seven organs of the Union are in blue, national / intergovernmental elements in orange.

Diagram describing the functioning of the European institutions and their interaction with each other and with Member States

The institutions of the European Union are the seven principal decision-making bodies of the European Union and Euratom governed under the Treaties of the European Union and European Union law. They are, as listed in Article 13 of the Treaty on the European Union:

- the European Parliament,
- the European Council (of heads of state or government),
- the Council of the European Union (of member state ministers, a council for each area of responsibility),
- the European Commission,
- the Court of Justice of the European Union,
- the European Central Bank and
- the European Court of Auditors.

Institutions are distinct from both advisory bodies to the European Union and agencies of the European Union.

== History ==
Most EU institutions were created with the establishment of the European Community in 1958. Much change since then has been in the context of shifting the balance of power away from the council and towards the Parliament. The role of the commission has often been to mediate between the two or tip the balance. However, the commission is becoming more accountable to the Parliament: in 1999 it forced the resignation of the Santer Commission and forced a reshuffle of the proposed Barroso Commission in 2004. The development of the institutions, with incremental changes from treaties and agreements, is testament to the evolution of the Union's structures without one clear "master plan." Some observers like Tom Reid of The Washington Post said of the institutions that "nobody would have deliberately designed a government as complex and as redundant as the EU."

=== Under the Treaty of Paris ===
The first institutions were created at the start of the 1950s with the creation of the European Coal and Steel Community (ECSC), based on the Schuman declaration, between six states. The ECSC was designed to bring the markets of coal and steel, the materials needed to wage war, under the control of a supranational authority with the aim of encouraging peace and economic development. It established the first institutions. At its core was an independent executive called the "High Authority" with supranational powers over the Community. The laws made by the Authority would be observed by a Court of Justice in order to ensure they were upheld and to arbitrate.

During the negotiations, two supervisory institutions were put forward to counterbalance the power of the High Authority. The "Common Assembly" proposed by Jean Monnet to act as a monitor, counterweight and to add democratic legitimacy was composed of 78 national parliamentarians. The second was the Council of Ministers, pushed by the smaller states also to add an intergovernmental element and harmonise national policies with those of the authority.

=== Establishment and changes ===
In 1957 the Treaties of Rome established two similar communities, creating a common market (European Economic Community) and promoting atomic energy co-operation (Euratom). The three institutions shared the Court of Justice and the Parliament, however, they had a separate Council and High Authority, which was called the Commission in these Communities. The reason for this is the different relationship between the Commission and Council. At the time the French government was suspicious of the supranational and wanted to limit the powers of the High Authority in the new Communities, giving the council a greater role in checking the executive.

The three communities were later merged in 1967, by the Merger Treaty, into the European Communities. The institutions were carried over from the European Economic Community (making the Commission of that community the direct ancestor of the current Commission). Under the Treaties of Rome, the Common Assembly (which renamed itself the Parliamentary Assembly, and then the European Parliament) was supposed to become elected. However, this was delayed by the council until 1979. Since then it gained more powers via successive treaties. The Maastricht Treaty also gave further powers to the council by giving it a key role in the two new pillars of the EU which were based on intergovernmental principles.

The 2009 Lisbon Treaty brought nearly all policy areas (including the budget) under the co-decision procedure (renamed "ordinary legislative procedure"), hence increasing the power of the Parliament. The rules for the distribution of seats in the parliament were also changed to a formula system. The High Representative merged with the European Commissioner for External Relations and joined the commission. The appointment of the Commission President became dependent upon the last EU elections. The Council of Ministers adopted more qualified majority voting and the European Council was made a distinct institution with a permanent president. The Court of Justice had some minor renaming and adjustments. In addition, the central bank became a full institution.

== Overview ==
Institutions of the European Union

European Council
Provides impetus and direction

Council of the European Union
Legislative

European Parliament
Legislative

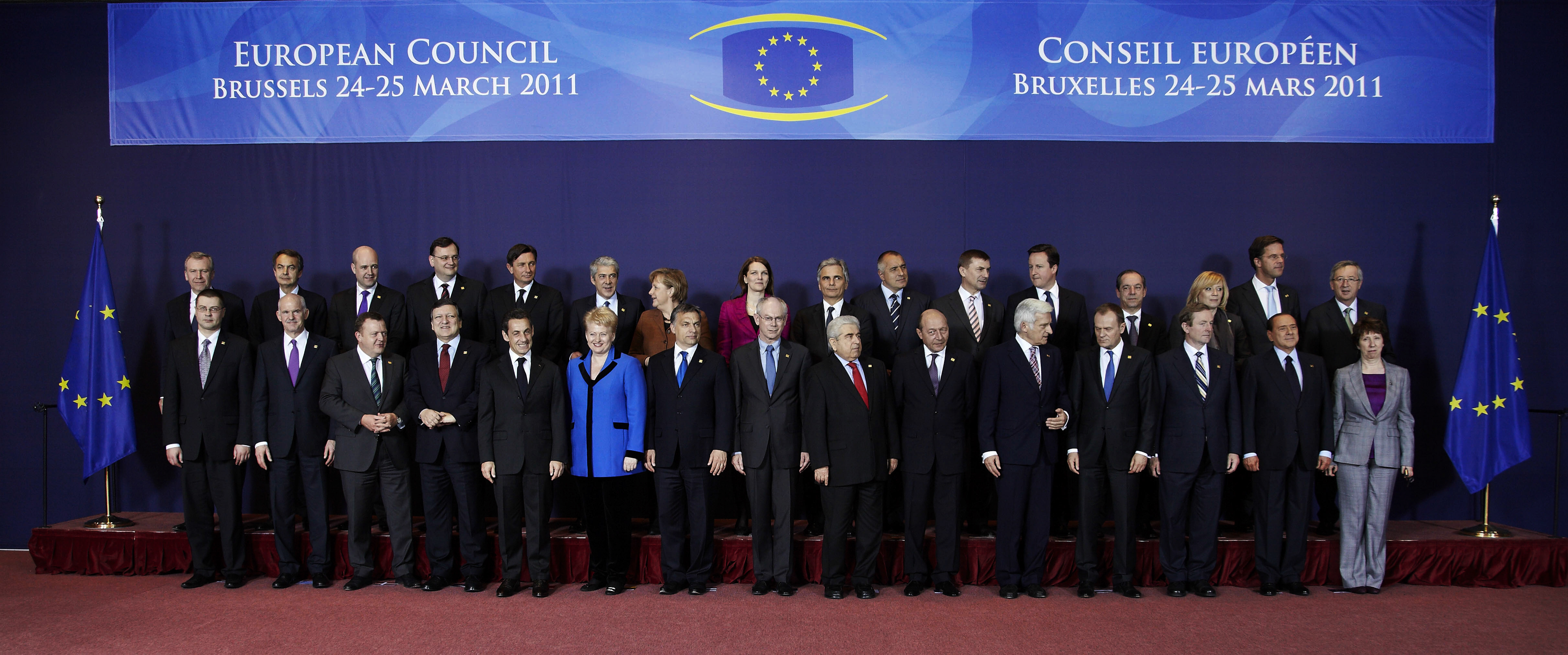
Based in Brussels, Belgium.
summit of the Heads of state or government, the President of the European Council and the President of the European Commission.; gives the necessary political impetus for the development of the Union and sets its general objectives and priorities; does not legislate

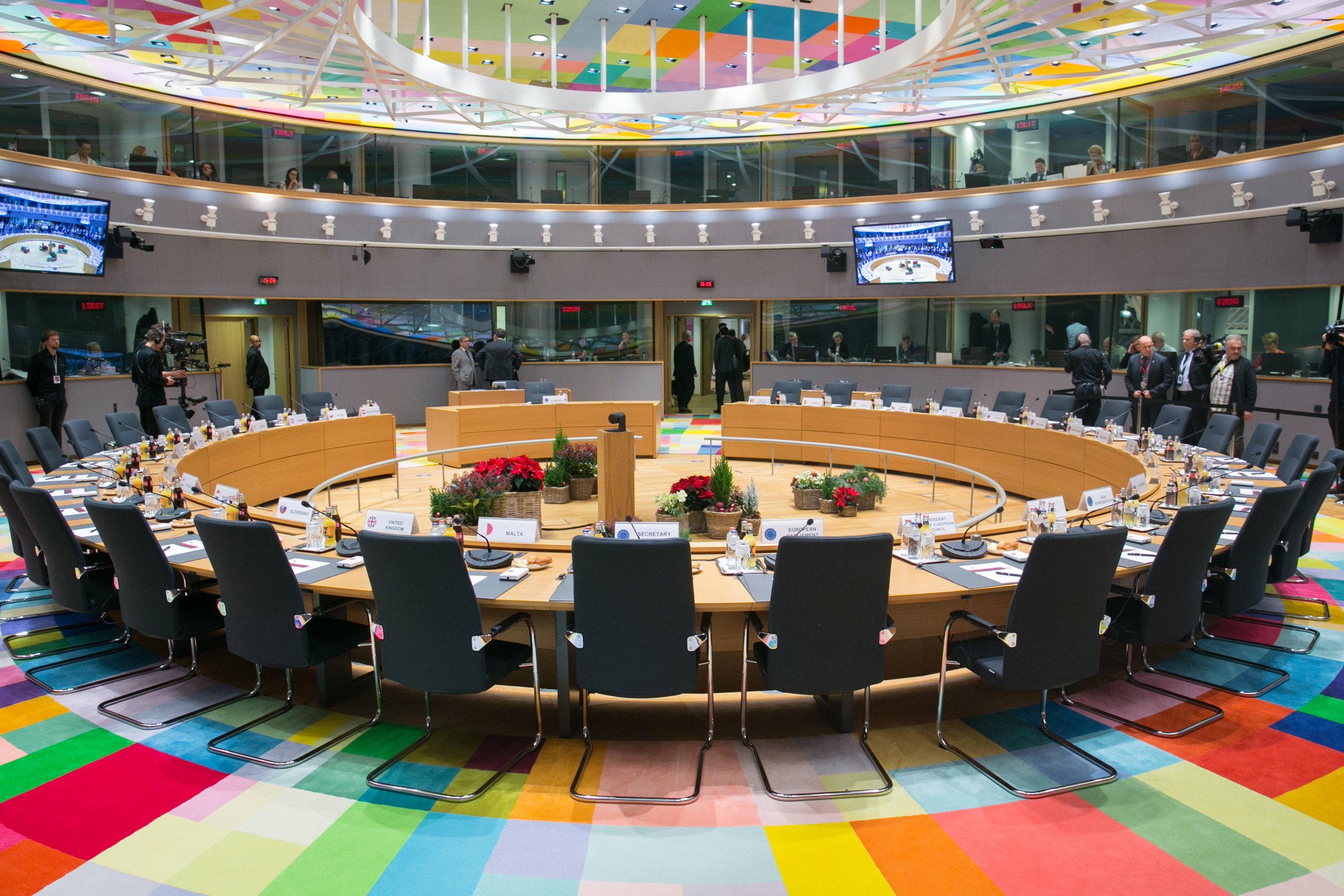
Based in Brussels, Belgium. Meets in Luxembourg, Luxembourg for the months of April, June and October.
composed of twenty-seven national ministers (one per state); formally known as "the Council"; informally known as the "Council of Ministers"; acts together with the Parliament as a legislature; shares with the Parliament the budgetary power; ensures coordination of the broad economic and social policy and sets out guidelines for the Common Foreign and Security Policy (CFSP); concludes international agreements

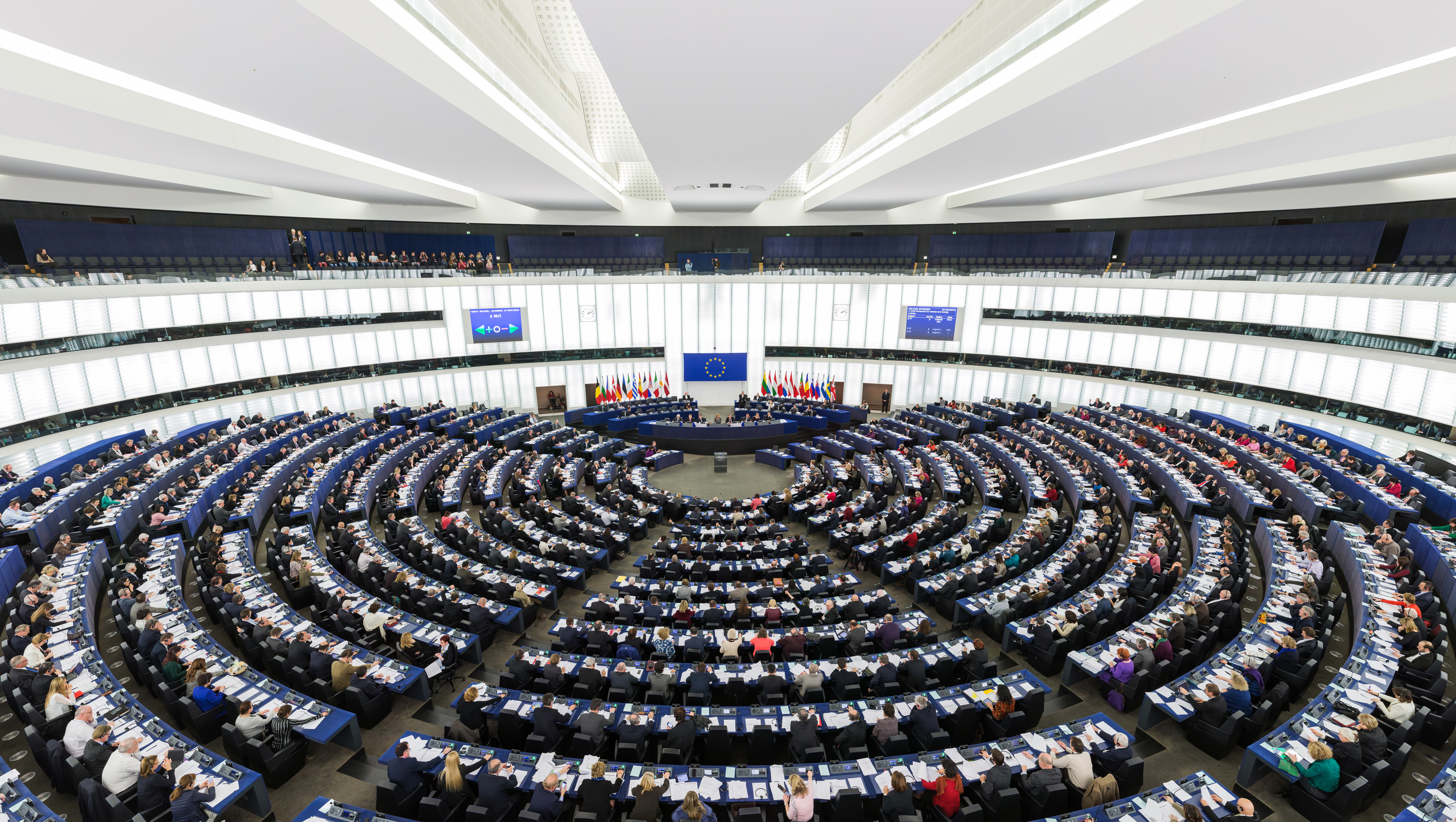
Meets in Strasbourg, France and Brussels, Belgium. Secretariat based in Luxembourg, Luxembourg.
acts together with the Council (of the European Union) as a legislature; shares with the Council (of the European Union) the budgetary power; exerts the democratic control over the institutions including the European Commission and approves the Commission members

European Commission
Executive

Court of Justice of the European Union
Judicial

European Central Bank
Central bank

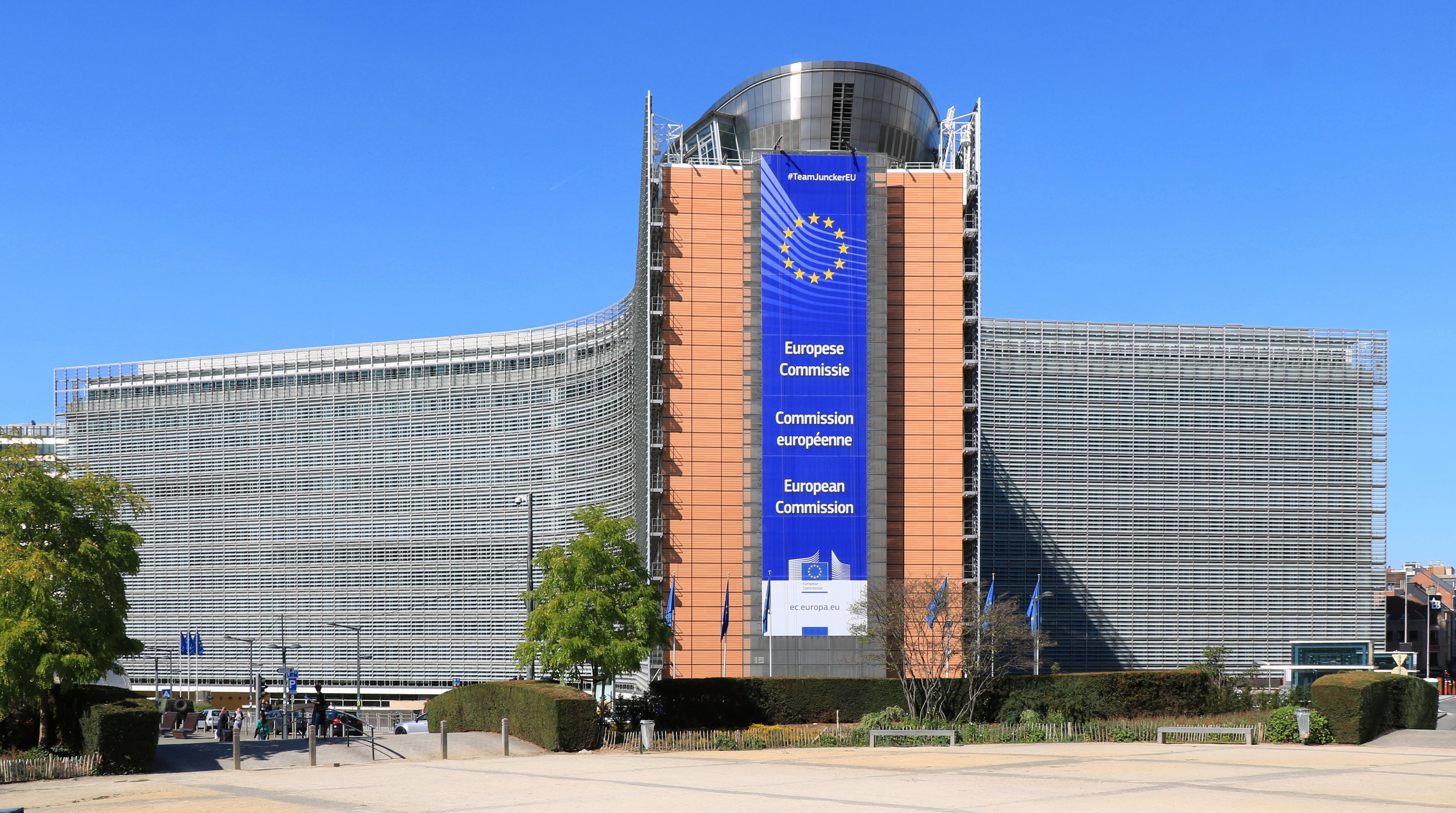
Based in Brussels, Belgium. Various departments and services hosted in Luxembourg, Luxembourg.
is the executive; submits proposals for new legislation to the Parliament and Council (of the European Union); implements policies; administers the budget; ensures compliance with European law ("guardian of the treaties"); negotiates international agreements

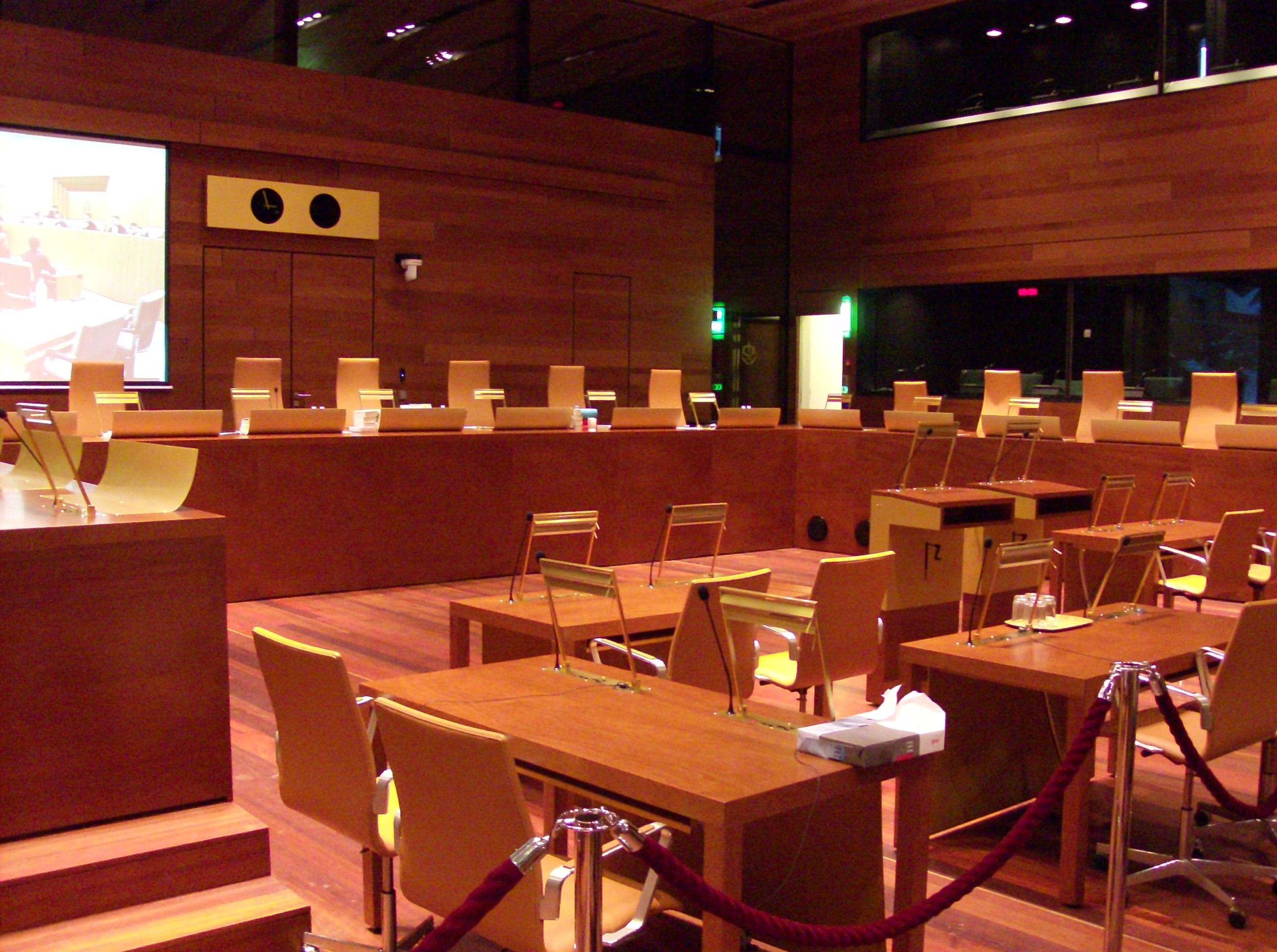
Based in Luxembourg, Luxembourg.
ensures the uniform application and interpretation of European law; has the power to decide legal disputes between member states, the institutions, businesses and individuals

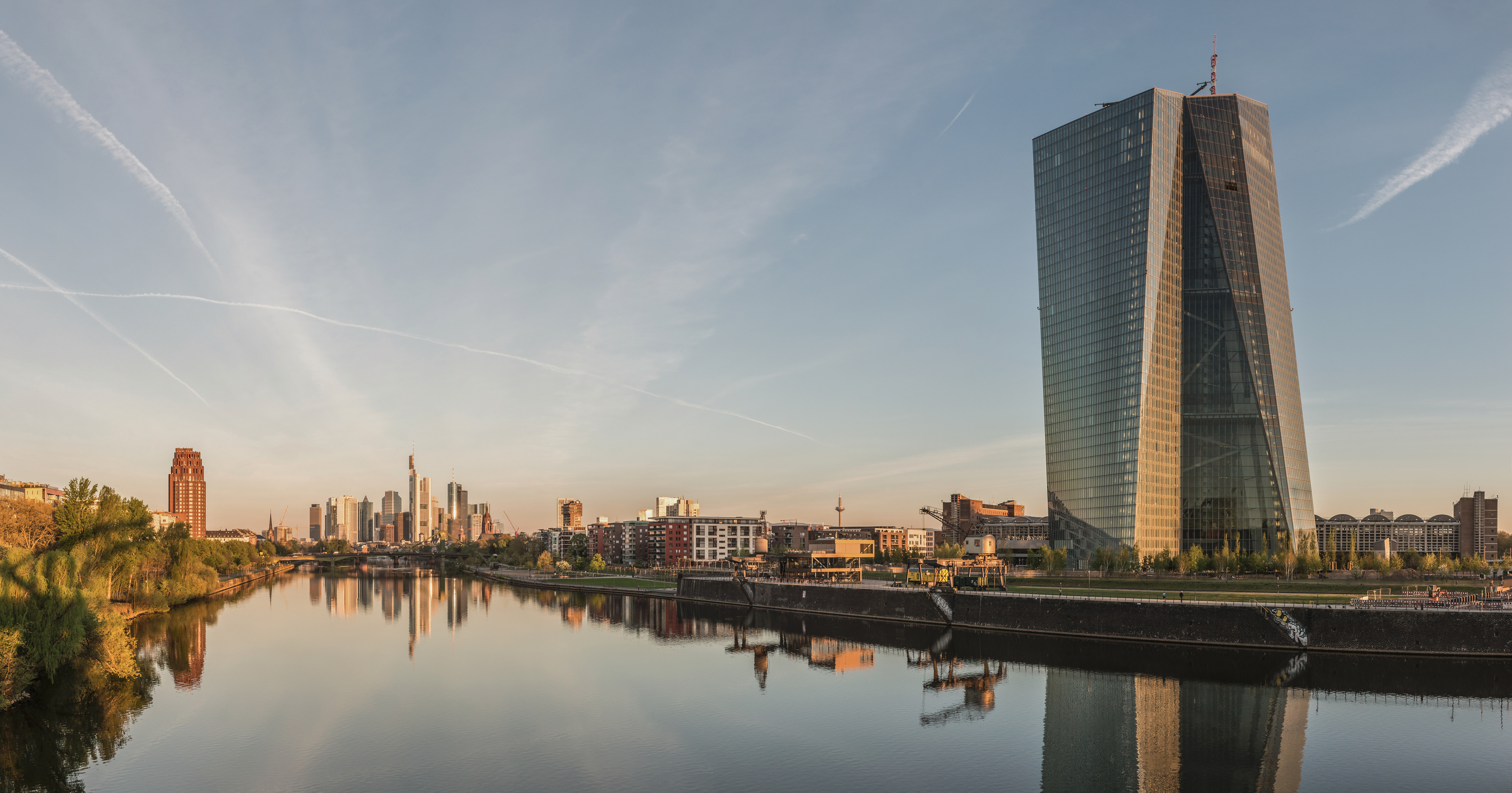
Based in Frankfurt, Germany.
is the only among the 7 institutions which also is an international entity with treaty capability in its own right; forms together with the national central banks the Eurosystem and thereby determines the monetary policy of the eurozone; ensures price stability in the eurozone by controlling the money supply

European Court of Auditors
Auditory
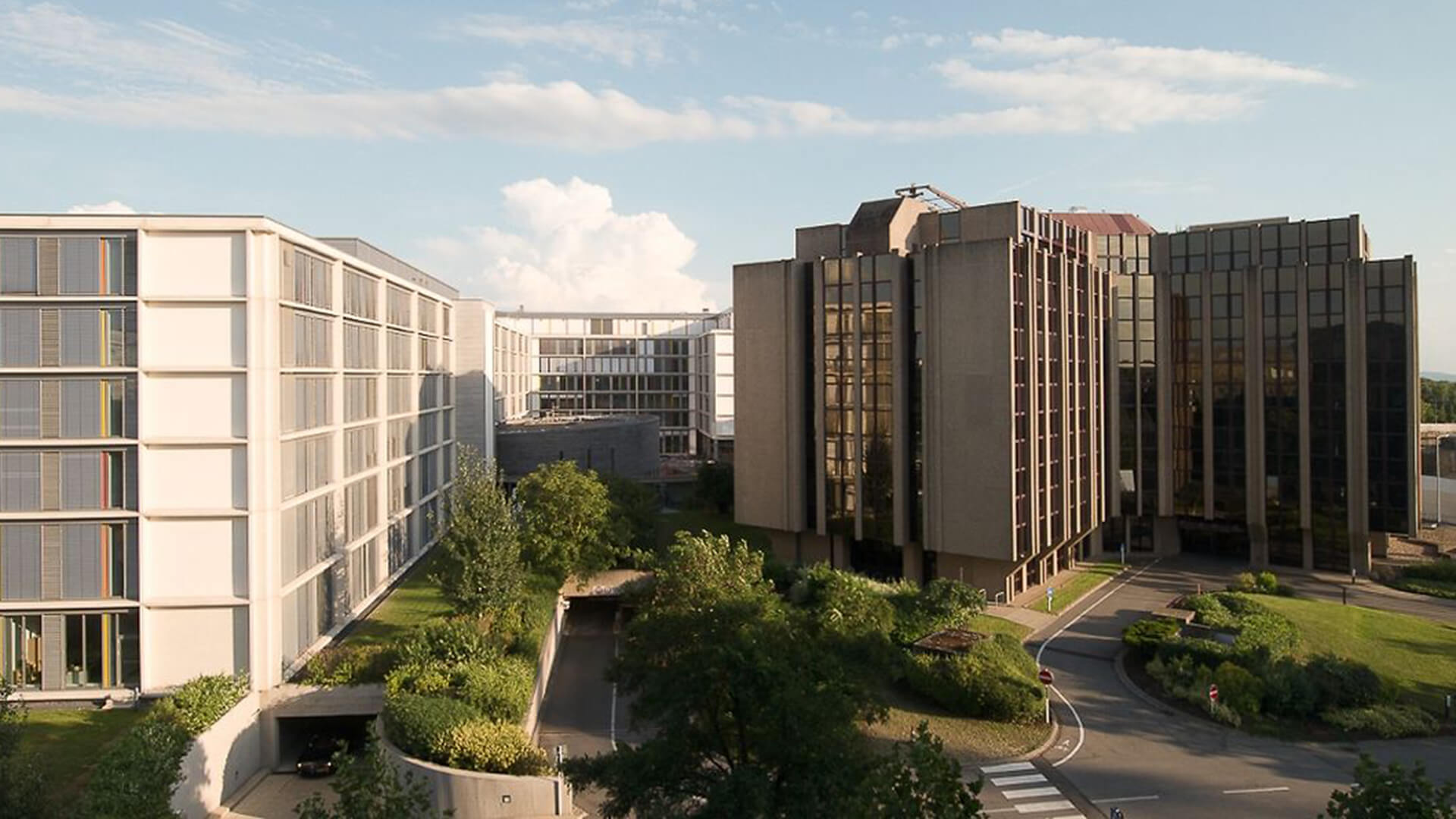
Based in Luxembourg, Luxembourg.
- checks the proper implementation of the budget

== List ==
There are three political institutions which hold the executive and legislative power of the union. The Council of the European Union represents governments, the parliament represents citizens and the commission represents the European interest. Essentially, the Council of the European Union, parliament or another party place a request for legislation to the commission. The commission then drafts this and presents it to the parliament and the Council of the European Union, where in most cases both must give their assent. Although the exact nature of this depends upon the legislative procedure in use, once it is approved and signed by both bodies it becomes law. The commission's duty is to ensure it is implemented by dealing with the day-to-day running of the Union and taking others to Court if they fail to comply.

=== European Parliament ===
The European Parliament (EP) shares the legislative and budgetary authority of the Union with the Council of the European Union (of relevant national government ministers). Its 705 members are elected every five years by universal suffrage and sit according to political allegiance. They represent nearly 500 million citizens (the world's second largest democratic electorate) and form the only directly elected body in the Union. Despite forming one of the two legislative chambers of the Union, it has weaker powers than the Council in some sensitive areas, and does not have legislative initiative. It does, however, have powers over the Commission which the Council does not. It has been said that its democratic nature and growing powers have made it one of the most powerful legislatures in the world.

The Parliament's President (its speaker) is Roberta Metsola (European People's Party), who was elected from the Parliament's members in 2022.

=== European Council ===
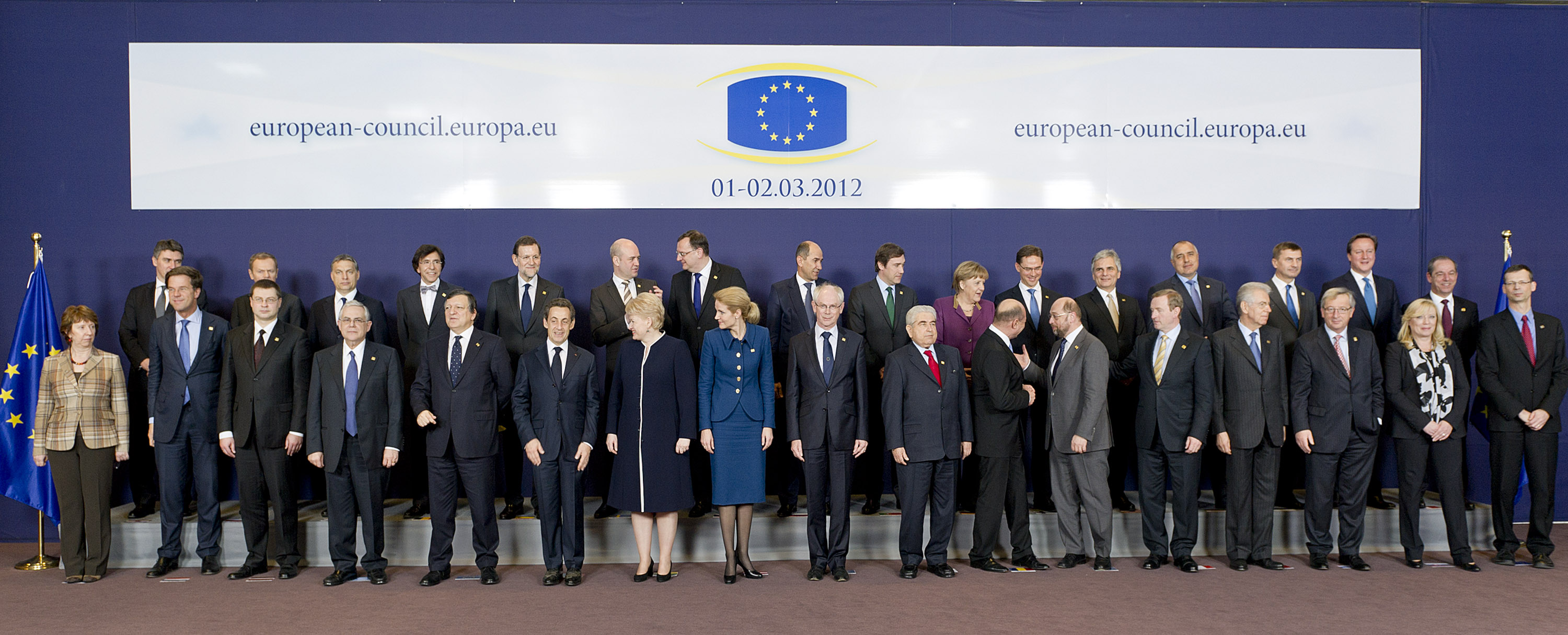
The European Council provides political direction at head of state or government level to the Union.

The European Council is the group of heads of state or government of the EU member states. It meets four times a year to define the Union's policy agenda and give impetus to integration. The President of the European Council is the person responsible for chairing and driving forward the work of the institution, which has been described as the highest political body of the European Union.

The current president is António Costa (since 1 December 2024).

=== Council of the European Union ===
The Council of the European Union (informally known as the Council of Ministers or just the Council) is a body holding legislative and some limited executive powers; it is responsible for approving legislation proposed by the European Commission, and thus can be considered a sort of upper house to Parliament's lower house in most areas. Its Presidency rotates between the states every six months, but every three Presidencies now cooperate on a common programme. This body is separate from the European Council, which is a similar body, but is composed of national leaders, not ministers.

The council is composed of twenty-seven national ministers (one per state). However the Council meets in various forms depending upon the topic. For example, if agriculture is being discussed, the council will be composed of each national minister for agriculture. They represent their governments and are accountable to their national political systems. Votes are taken either by majority or unanimity with votes allocated according to population. In these various forms they share the legislative and budgetary power of the Parliament, and also lead the Common Foreign and Security Policy.

The presidency is being held by Ireland since July 2026.

=== European Commission ===
The European Commission (EC) is the executive arm of the Union. It is a body composed of one appointee from each state, currently twenty-seven, but is designed to be independent of national interests. The body is responsible for drafting all law of the European Union and has the ability to propose new laws (bills). The Commission also deals with the day-to-day running of the Union and has the duty of upholding the law and treaties (in this role it is known as the "Guardian of the Treaties").

The commission is led by a President who is nominated by the council (in practice the European Council) and approved by Parliament. The remaining 26 Commissioners are nominated by member states, in consultation with the President, and have their portfolios assigned by the President. The Council then adopts this list of nominee-Commissioners. The council's adoption of the commission is not an area which requires the decision to be unanimous; their acceptance is arrived at according to the rules for qualified majority voting. The European Parliament then interviews and casts its vote upon the Commissioners. The interviews of individual nominees are conducted separately, in contrast to Parliament's vote of approval which must be cast on the commission as a whole without the ability to accept or reject individual Commissioners. Once approval has been obtained from the Parliament, the Commissioners can take office. The current President is Ursula von der Leyen (EPP); her commission was elected in 2019.

=== Court of Justice of the European Union ===
The Court of Justice of the European Union (CJEU) (French: Cour de justice de l'Union européenne or "CJUE"; Latin: Curia) is the judicial branch of the European Union (EU) and is responsible for interpreting EU law and treaties.

The CJUE consists of two separate courts: the Court of Justice and the General Court.

From 2005 to 2016 it also consisted of the Civil Service Tribunal.

The CJEU is located in Luxembourg.

=== European Central Bank ===
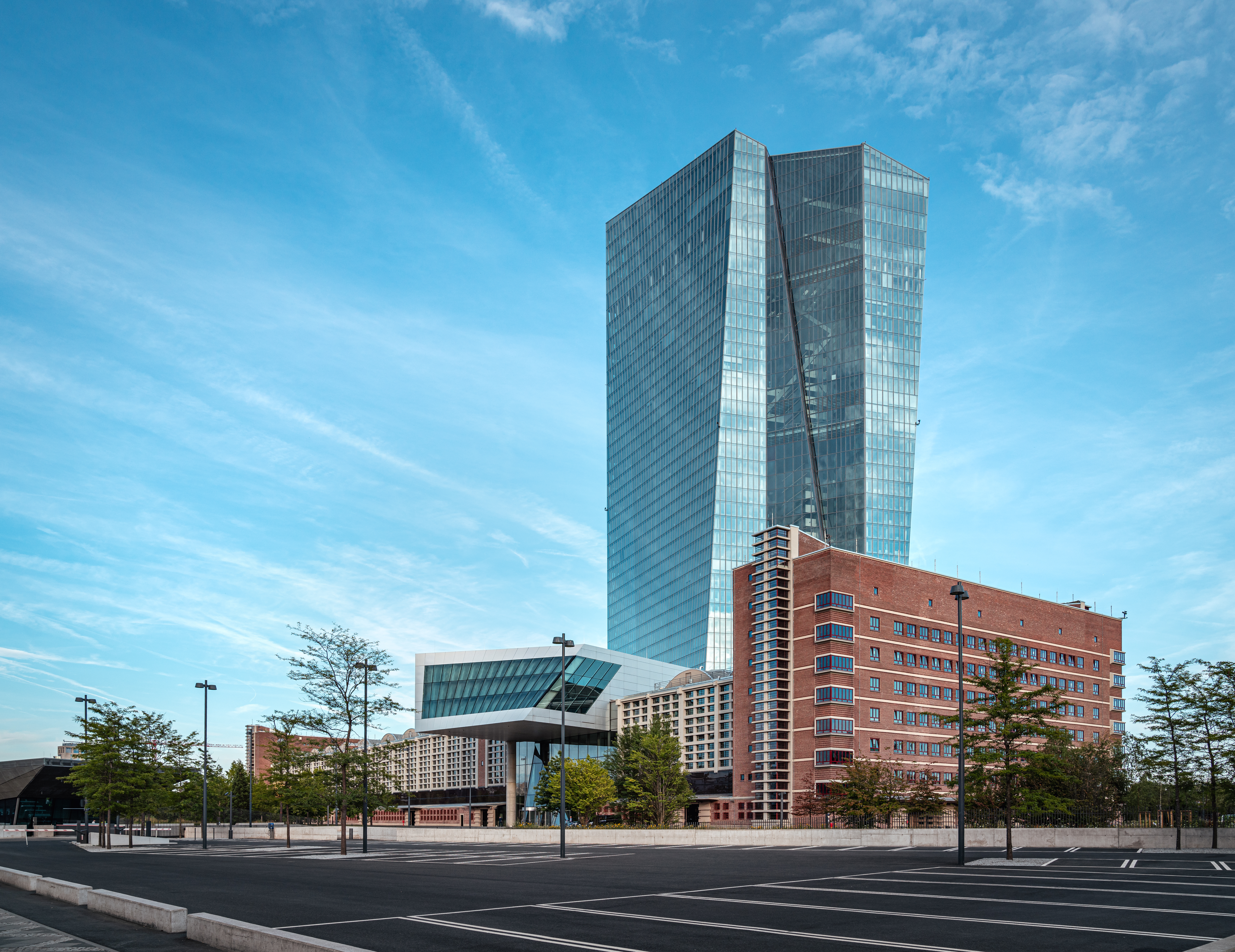
European Central Bank headquarters in Frankfurt

The European Central Bank (ECB) is the only one among the 7 institutions that is also an international entity with treaty capability in its own right. It is at the centre of the European System of Central Banks which comprises all EU national banks. The bank is governed by a board of national bank governors and a president. It is also the central bank for the eurozone (the states which have adopted the euro) and thus controls monetary policy in that area with an agenda to maintain price stability.

The ECB is located in Frankfurt.

The current president is Christine Lagarde.

=== European Court of Auditors ===
The European Court of Auditors (ECA), despite its name, has no judicial powers. It ensures that taxpayer funds from the budget of the European Union have been correctly spent. The court provides an audit report for each financial year to the Council and Parliament. The Parliament uses this to decide whether to approve the commission's handling of the budget. The Court also gives opinions and proposals on financial legislation and anti-fraud actions.

The Court of Auditors was set up in 1975. It was created as an independent institution due to the sensitivity of the issue of fraud in the Union (the anti-fraud agency, OLAF, is also built on its independence). It is composed of one member from each state appointed by the Council every six years. Every three years one of them is elected as the president of the court, who is currently Tony Murphy.

== Acts and procedures ==
The codecision procedure is most common, and means the Council and Parliament jointly consider law proposals from the commission.

There are a number of types of legislation which can be passed. The strongest is a regulation, an act or law which is directly applicable in its entirety. Then there are directives which bind members to certain goals which they must achieve. They do this through their own laws and hence have room to manoeuvre in deciding upon them. A decision is an instrument which is focused at a particular person/group and is directly applicable. Institutions may also issue recommendations and opinions which are merely non-binding declarations.

The ordinary legislative procedure is used in nearly all policy areas and provides an equal footing between the two bodies. Under the procedure, the Commission presents a proposal to Parliament and the council. They then send amendments to the Council which can either adopt the text with those amendments or send back a "common position". That proposal may either be approved or further amendments may be tabled by the Parliament. If the Council does not approve those, then a "Conciliation Committee" is formed. The committee is composed of the Council members plus an equal number of MEPs who seek to agree a common position. Once a position is agreed, it has to be approved by Parliament again by an absolute majority. There are other special procedures used in sensitive areas which reduce the power of Parliament.

== Comparisons ==
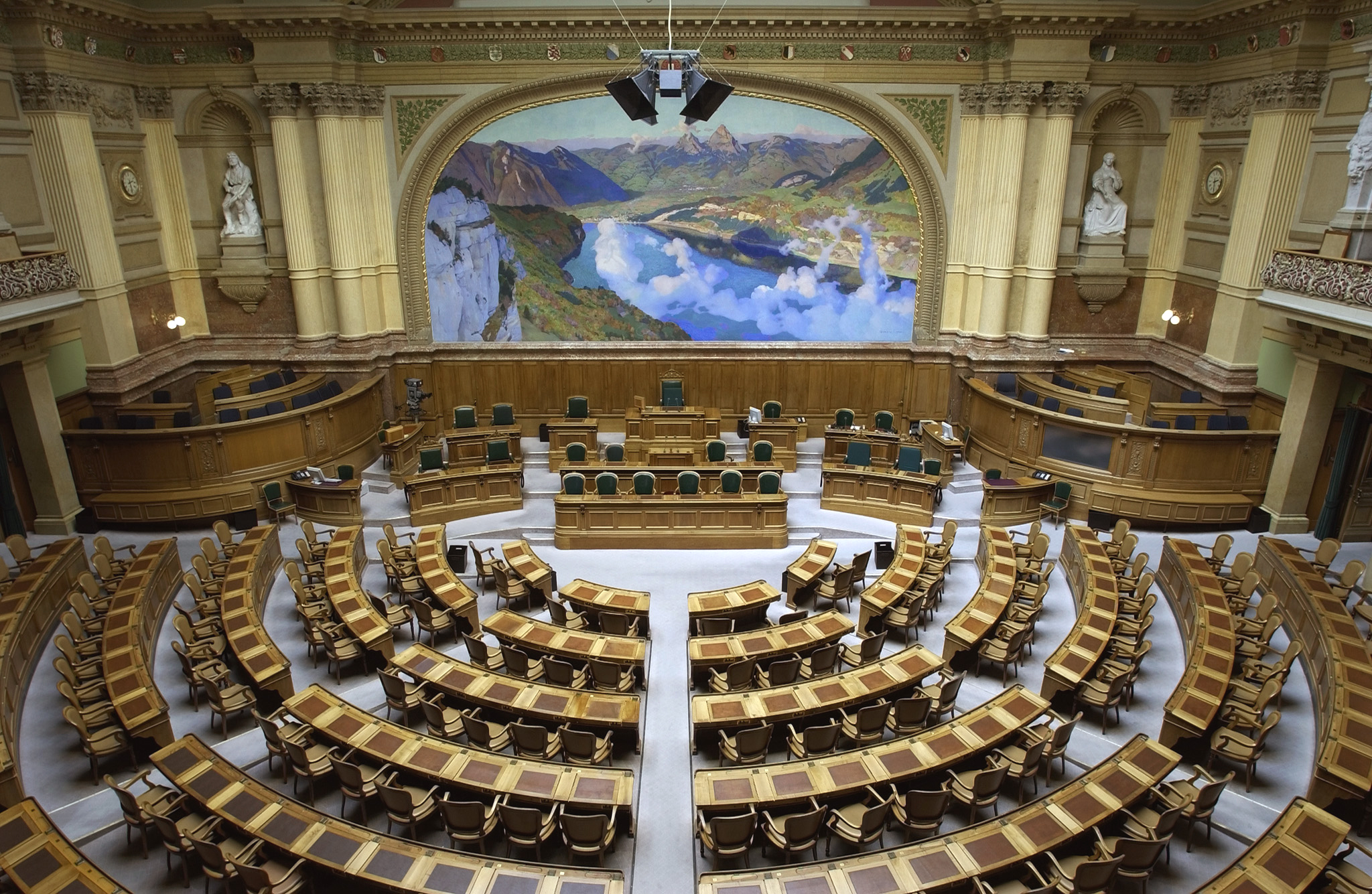
The EU's institution bears a resemblance to the Swiss government.

While the EU's system of governance is largely unique, elements can be compared to other models. One general observation on the nature of the distribution of powers would be that the EU resembles the federalism of Germany. There, powers are predominantly shared (states can exercise federal powers where the federation has not already exercised them) between the levels of government, and the states participate strongly with decision-making at the federal level. This is in contrast with other federations, for example the United States, where powers are more clearly divided between the levels of government, and the states have little say in federal decision-making.

The EU's institutional set up is also somewhat similar to the government of Switzerland. The Swiss consensus-driven system is seen as successfully uniting a state divided by language and religion, although the EU was not directly modelled on the Swiss system despite bearing a number of similarities. The European Commission has similarities to the Swiss Federal Council in that both have all-party representation and are appointed on the basis of nationality rather than popularity. The President of the Federal Council rotates between its members each year, in a fashion similar to that of the EU's Council Presidency. Due to this system of presidency Swiss leaders, like those of the EU, are relatively unknown with national politics viewed as somewhat technocratic resulting in low voter turnout, in a similar fashion to that of the European Parliament. Other parallels include the jealously guarded powers of states, the considerable level of translation and the choice of a lesser city as the capital.

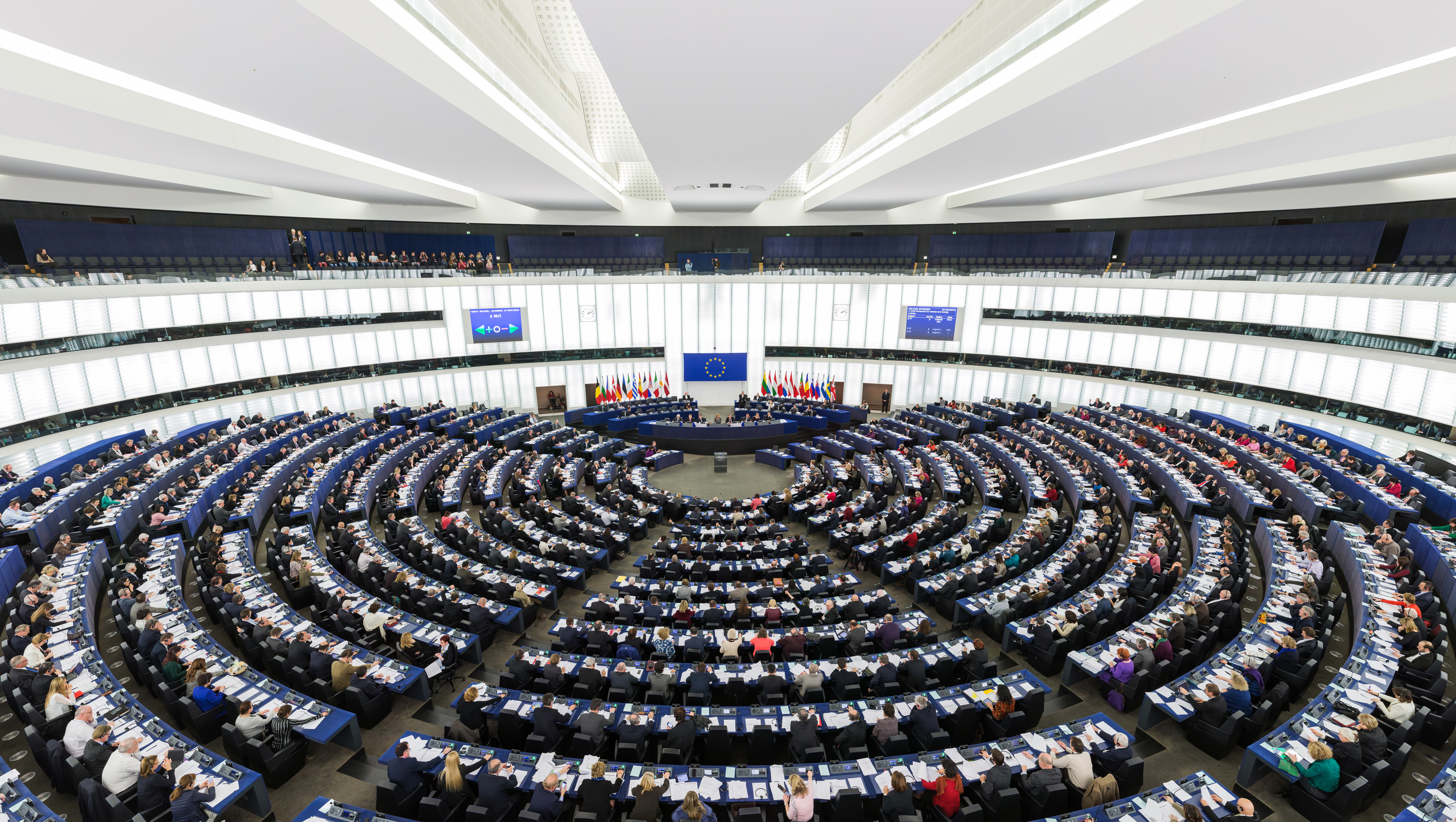
The European Parliament

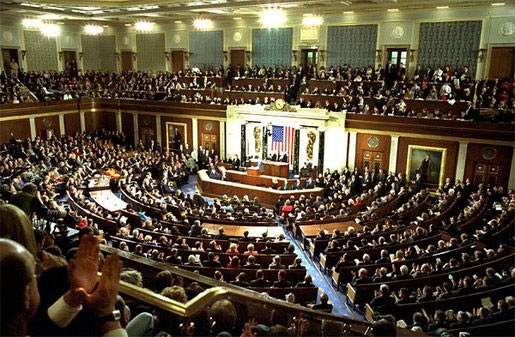
The European Parliament is better compared with the U. S. House of Representatives than with the national parliaments.

Furthermore, executive power in the EU is not concentrated in a single institution. It becomes clearer under the Lisbon Treaty with the division of the European Council as a distinct institution with a fixed President. This arrangement has been compared to the dual executives found in the French republic, a system devised by Charles de Gaulle in 1958, where there is a President—cognate with EU's Council (of Ministers) President, and a Prime Minister—equivalent to the European Commission President. However, unlike the French model, the Council President does not hold strong formal powers such as the ability to directly appoint and sack the other, or the ability to dissolve Parliament. Hence while the Council President may have prestige, it would lack power and while the Commission President would have power, it would lack the prestige of the former.

The nature of the European Parliament is better compared with the United States House of Representatives than with the national parliaments of the European Union. This is notable in terms of the committees being of greater size and power, political parties being very decentralised and it being separated from the executive branch—most national governments operate under a parliamentary system. A difference from all other parliaments is the absence of a Parliamentary legislative initiative. However, given that in most national parliaments initiatives not backed by the executive rarely succeed the value of this difference is in question. Equally, its independence and power means that the European Parliament has an unusually high success rate for its amendments in comparison to national parliaments; 80% average and 30% for controversial proposals.

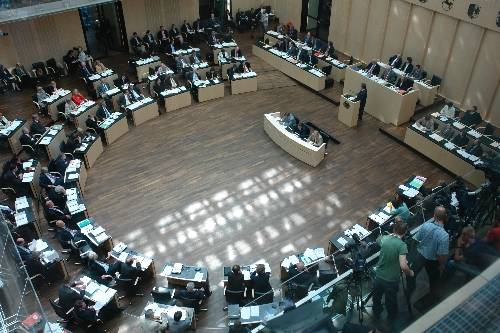
The Council and the German Bundesrat are both composed by representatives of the states governments.

The composition of the council can only be compared with the quite unique and unusual composition of the German upper house, the Bundesrat. Membership of the Bundesrat is limited to members of the governments of the states of Germany and can be recalled by those governments in the same manner as the EU's Council. They retain their state role while sitting in the Bundesrat and their term ends when they are recalled by their state governments (who are solely responsible for their appointment) or they cease to sit in their state government. Hence they also are not elected at the same time and the body as a whole cannot be dissolved like most parliaments. As government representatives, members do not vote as individual members but in state blocks, rather than political alignment, to their state governments' agreed line. Each state has unequal voting powers based on population, with an absolute majority required for decisions. Likewise, the presidency rotates equally between members, though each year rather than every six months like in the EU Council. However, unlike the EU's Council, the Bundesrat does not vary its composition depending on the topic being discussed. They both bear similar criticisms, because of the interference of executives in the legislative process.

== Locations ==
The institutions are not concentrated in a single capital city; instead, their headquarters are spread across four cities: Brussels, Luxembourg, Strasbourg and Frankfurt. The current arrangement was approved in 1992 and attached to the Treaty of Amsterdam. The treaty states that the Commission and Council would be based in Brussels, the Courts in Luxembourg City, and the Parliament in Strasbourg. However some departments of the commission and meetings of the Council take place in Luxembourg City, while the Parliament has its committees and some sessions in Brussels and its secretariat in Luxembourg City. Of the new institutions, the Central Bank is based in Frankfurt, while the European Council is based in Brussels (but has some extraordinary meetings elsewhere).

Brussels' hosting of institutions has made it a major centre for the EU. Together with NATO it has attracted more journalists and ambassadors than Washington, D.C. However the three-city agreement has been criticised, notably concerning the Parliament, due to the large number of people that move between the cities. The European Green Party estimated that the arrangement costs 200 million euro and 20,268 tonnes of carbon dioxide. Brussels is preferred by some due to the presence of other institutions and other groups whereas Strasbourg is supported due to its historical importance to European unity.

== See also ==
- Bodies of the European Union and Euratom
- Brussels and the European Union
- European Investment Bank
- European External Action Service
- European Civil Service
- Glossary of European Union concepts, acronyms, and jargon
- List of the names of bodies of the European Union in its official languages
- List of presidents of the institutions of the European Union
- List of acronyms associated with the eurozone crisis
