= Agencies of the European Union =

Distinct body of the European Union

The European Union and Euratom have agencies, decentralised independent bodies, corporate bodies and joint undertakings which are established as juridical persons through secondary EU legislation and tasked with a specific narrow field of work. They are a part of the wider set of bodies of the European Union and Euratom and are therefore distinct from:

- international law juridical persons established through primary (treaty) legislation, either as an EU institution (the European Central Bank) or as an EU body of another type (such as the European Investment Bank Group entities, the European University Institute, the European Stability Mechanism or the Unified Patent Court)
- other EU institutions
- other EU bodies lacking juridical personality, including the advisory bodies, the independent offices held by a single person (European Ombudsman, European Data Protection Supervisor), and the (non-independent, auxiliary) EU inter-institutional services, regardless of whether established through treaty or through secondary legislation
- the pan-EU organisational forms which are not considered constituent bodies of the EU or Euratom, regardless of whether possessing juridical personality (European Research Infrastructure Consortium, European political party, European political foundation, European grouping of territorial cooperation, Societas Europaea, Societas Cooperativa Europaea) or lacking it (European economic interest grouping)

== Overview ==
In contrast to other EU bodies established through secondary legislation, each of more than fifty such entities has its own juridical personality granted by the EU law, recognised across the EU, and in some cases, also across the EEA countries, Switzerland, Serbia, Ukraine, the United Kingdom and Turkey. Nevertheless, in relations with other non-EU third countries, they are in general not recognised as independent entities, thus being considered either parts of the juridical personality of the EU or Euratom.

Some of the agencies, decentralised independent bodies and joint undertakings of the European Union and Euratom are tasked with answering the need to develop scientific or technical know-how in certain fields, others bring together different interest groups to facilitate dialogue at European and international level.

== Existing agencies ==
They are divided into the following groups:

=== Decentralised agencies of the EU ===
Distinct from the EU institutions, the agencies of the European Union are specialist bodies set up to advise the Institutions and Member States in areas that affect everyone living in the Union. They are located in member states across the EU, providing services, information, and know-how. The total budget of all the decentralised agencies is approximately 0.8% of the EU's annual budget.

==== Single market agencies ====
Single market agencies (under the former I Pillar)
Official name	Abbreviation	Location	Member state	Est.	Members and observers
European Centre for the Development of Professional Training	Cedefop	Thessaloniki	Greece	1975	members: EU states observers: Iceland, Norway
European Foundation for the Improvement of Living and Working Conditions	EUROFOUND	Dublin	Ireland	1975	members: EU states, European Commission observers: EFTA
European Agency for Safety and Health at Work	EU-OSHA	Bilbao	Spain	1994	members: EU states, European Commission
European Environment Agency	EEA	Copenhagen	Denmark	1994	members: EU states, Iceland, Liechtenstein, Norway, Switzerland, Turkey cooperating: Albania, Bosnia and Herzegovina, Kosovo, Moldova, Montenegro, North Macedonia, Serbia, Ukraine
European Training Foundation	ETF	Turin	Italy	1994	members: EU states, European Commission
European Union Intellectual Property Office	EUIPO	Alicante	Spain	1994	members: EU states, European Commission
Community Plant Variety Office	CPVO	Angers	France	1994	members: EU states, European Commission
Translation Centre for the Bodies of the European Union	CdT	Luxembourg City	Luxembourg	1994	members: EU states, European Commission
European Medicines Agency	EMA	Amsterdam (since 2019); London (1995–2019) (Note: With the United Kingdom departure from the EU, the EU decided to relocate the agencies based in London to Amsterdam and Paris on 20 November 2017.)	Netherlands (UK until 2019)	1995	members: EU states, European Commission, European Parliament observers: Iceland, Liechtenstein, Norway
European Food Safety Authority	EFSA	Parma	Italy	2002	members: EU states, Iceland, Norway observers: European Commission, Albania, Bosnia and Herzegovina, Kosovo, Montenegro, North Macedonia, Serbia, Switzerland, Turkey
European Maritime Safety Agency	EMSA	Lisbon	Portugal	2002	members: EU states, European Commission, Iceland, Norway
European Aviation Safety Agency	EASA	Cologne	Germany	2003	members: EU states, European Commission, Iceland, Liechtenstein, Norway, Switzerland observers: Albania, Bosnia and Herzegovina, Georgia, Moldova, Montenegro, North Macedonia, Serbia
European Railway Agency	ERA	Valenciennes and Lille	France	2004	members: EU states, European Commission, Norway
European Centre for Disease Prevention and Control	ECDC	Stockholm	Sweden	2005	members: EU states, European Commission, European Parliament observers: Iceland, Liechtenstein, Norway
European Fisheries Control Agency	EFCA	Vigo	Spain	2005	members: EU states, European Commission
European Chemicals Agency	ECHA	Helsinki	Finland	2007	members: EU states, European Commission, European Parliament observers: Iceland, Norway
Agency for the Cooperation of Energy Regulators	ACER	Ljubljana	Slovenia	2009	members: EU states, European Commission observers: Iceland, Norway
Agency for Support for BEREC	BEREC Office	Riga	Latvia	2010	members: EU states, European Commission observers: Albania, Bosnia and Herzegovina, Iceland, Kosovo, Liechtenstein, Moldova, Montenegro, North Macedonia, Norway, Serbia, Ukraine
European Labour Authority	ELA	Bratislava	Slovakia	2019	members: EU states, European Commission, European Parliament, Iceland, Liechtenstein, Norway observers: Switzerland
European Union Agency for the Space Programme	EUSPA	Prague	Czech Republic	2021	members: EU states, European Commission observers: European Space Agency, Iceland, Norway, Switzerland
EU Customs Authority	EUCA	Lille	France	TBD	

==== Area of freedom, security and justice agencies ====
Area of freedom, security and justice agencies (under the former III Pillar)
Official name	Abbreviation	Location	Member state	Est.	Members and observers
European Union Agency for Law Enforcement Training	CEPOL	Budapest (since 2014); Bramshill (2005–2014)	Hungary (UK till 2014)	2005	members: EU states without Denmark associates: Iceland, Norway, Switzerland
European Union Agency for Law Enforcement Cooperation	Europol	The Hague	Netherlands	1998	members: EU states
European body for the enhancement of judicial co-operation	Eurojust	The Hague	Netherlands	2002	members: EU states
European Agency for the operational management of large-scale IT Systems in the area of freedom, security and justice	eu-LISA	Tallinn	Estonia	2012	members: EU states, European Commission associated states: Iceland, Liechtenstein, Norway, Switzerland
European Border and Coast Guard Agency	Frontex	Warsaw	Poland	2016	members: All EU states except Ireland, European Commission, Iceland, Liechtenstein, Norway, Switzerland
European Union Drugs Agency	EUDA	Lisbon	Portugal	1993	members: EU states, European Commission, European Parliament, Norway, Turkey
European Union Agency for Cybersecurity	ENISA	Athens	Greece	2005	members: EU states, European Commission observers: Iceland, Lichtenstein, Norway
European Union Agency for Asylum	EUAA	Valletta	Malta	2011	members: all EU states except Denmark, European Commission observers: Denmark, Iceland, Lichtenstein, Norway, Switzerland, UNHCR
European Institute for Gender Equality	EIGE	Vilnius	Lithuania	2007	members: EU states
European Union Agency for Fundamental Rights	FRA	Vienna	Austria	2007	members: EU states, European Commission, Council of Europe observers: Albania, North Macedonia, Serbia
Authority for Anti-Money Laundering and Countering the Financing of Terrorism	AMLA	Frankfurt	Germany	2024	members: EU states

=== European supervisory authorities ===
European supervisory authorities (of the European System of Financial Supervision)

Official name	Abbreviation	Location	Member state	Est.	Members and observers
European Banking Authority	EBA	Paris (since 2019); London (2011–2019)	France (UK till 2019)	2011	members: EU states, European Commission, European Central Bank, Iceland, Liechtenstein, Norway
European Securities and Markets Authority	ESMA	Paris	France	2011	members: EU states, European Commission, Iceland, Liechtenstein, Norway
European Insurance and Occupational Pensions Authority	EIOPA	Frankfurt	Germany	2011	members: EU states, European Commission, Iceland, Liechtenstein, Norway

=== Banking union (Single Resolution Mechanism) bodies ===
Single Resolution Mechanism bodies (of the European banking union)

Official name	Abbreviation	Location	Member state	Est.	Members and observers
Single Resolution Board	SRB	Brussels	Belgium	2015	Eurozone countries

=== Common Security and Defence Policy agencies ===
Common Security and Defence Policy agencies (under the former II Pillar)

Official name	Abbreviation	Location	Member state	Est.	Members and observers
European Defence Agency	EDA	Brussels	Belgium	2004	Members: EU states, European Commission; Administrative Arrangements: European Space Agency, Norway, Serbia, Switzerland, Ukraine, United States
European Institute for Security Studies	EUISS	Paris	France	2001	
European Union Satellite Centre	SatCen	Torrejón de Ardoz	Spain	2002	

=== Executive agencies of the EU ===
Executive agencies are created by the European Commission for a fixed period.

Official name	Abbreviation	Location
European Innovation Council and SMEs Executive Agency	EISMEA	Brussels
European Education and Culture Executive Agency	EACEA	Brussels
European Climate, Infrastructure and Environment Executive Agency	CINEA	Brussels
European Research Executive Agency	REA	Brussels
European Research Council Executive Agency	ERCEA	Brussels
European Health and Digital Executive Agency	HaDEA	Brussels

=== Euratom agencies ===
Official name	Abbreviation	Location
Euratom Supply Agency	ESA	Luxembourg City

== Joint undertakings ==
A joint undertaking is a juridical person and a subsidiary body of the EU or Euratom, established through an agreement between the European Commission, the participating member states, and the European industry of a certain field, with the purpose of implementing a public-private partnership project.

=== of the European Union ===
Official name	Abbreviation
Bio-based Industries	BBI
Clean Aviation	CAJU
Electronic Components and Systems	ECSEL
Clean Hydrogen Joint Undertaking	CHJU
Global Health EDCTP3	Global Health EDCTP3
High-Performance Computing	EuroHPC
Innovative Health Initative	IHI
Single European Sky Air Traffic Management Research	SESAR
Europe's Rail	EU-Rail

=== of Euratom ===
Official name	Abbreviation
Fusion for Energy	F4E

== Independent secondary-legislation bodies ==
=== Decentralised ===
The list includes the two decentralised bodies other than agencies, established as EU juridical persons through secondary legislation of the EU/Euratom.

Official name	Abbrev.	Location	Member state	Members and associates
European Institute of Innovation and Technology	EIT	Budapest	Hungary	Members: EEA countries, Switzerland; associates: the United Kingdom
European Public Prosecutor's Office	EPPO	Luxembourg City	Luxembourg	Members: all EU states except Denmark and Ireland

=== Other ===
The list includes the remaining two bodies other than agencies, decentralised bodies or joint undertakings, established as EU juridical persons through secondary legislation of the EU/Euratom.

Official name	Abbreviation	Location	Member state	Est.
European Data Protection Board	EDPB	Brussels	Belgium	2018
Authority for European Political Parties and European Political Foundations	APPF	Brussels	Belgium	2016

== Non-existing decentralised bodies ==
=== Proposed and abandoned ===
Name	Abbreviation	Fate
Health Emergency Preparedness and Response Authority	HERA	Eventually established as DG HERA instead.

=== Transformed or dissolved ===
==== Agencies ====
Official name	Abbreviation	Location	Member state	Established	Abolished	Fate
European Monitoring Centre on Racism and Xenophobia	EUMC	Vienna	Austria	1997	2007	Transformed into FRA
European Agency for Reconstruction	EAR	Thessaloniki	Greece	2000	2008	Dissolved; tasks assigned to DG NEAR and IPA
Consumers, Health, Agriculture and Food Executive Agency	Chafea	Luxembourg City	Luxembourg	2005	2015	Dissolved; tasks assigned to DG SANTE and to HaDEA
European GNSS Supervisory Authority	GSA	undef.	undef.	2004	2010	Transformed into the second GSA
European GNSS Agency	GSA	Prague	Czech Republic	2010	2021	Transformed into EUSPA
European Agency for the Management of Operational Cooperation at the External Borders of the Member States of the European Union	Frontex	Warsaw	Poland	2005	2016	Transformed into current Frontex

==== Euratom joint undertakings ====
- Schnell-Brüter- Kernkraftwerksgesellschaft mbH' (SBK)
- Hochtemperatur- Kernkraftwerk GmbH (HKG)
- Joint European Torus (JET)

== See also ==
- Directorate-General
- European integration – participation by non-EU states in EU initiatives
- Glossary of European Union concepts, acronyms, and jargon
- Meroni doctrine
