= Operating budget =

Income and expenditure from daily business

The operating budget contains the revenue and expenditure generated from the daily business functions of the company. It concentrates on the operating expenditures — the cost of goods sold, the cost of direct labour and direct materials that are tied to production; as well as the overhead and administration costs tied directly to manufacturing the goods and providing services.

The operating budget will not contain capital expenditures and long-term loans.

== See also ==
- Capital budgeting
