= Fixed liability =

Debt, bond, mortgage or loan

A fixed liability is a debt, bond, mortgage or loan that is payable over a term exceeding one year. Such debts are better known as non-current liabilities or long-term liabilities. Debts or liabilities due within one year are known as current liabilities.

== Definition ==
According to Accounting Explained, long-term liabilities are financial obligations of a company that are due after one year or longer. These types of liabilities are placed on a balance sheet of a company together with current liabilities that represent payments which are due within one year.

It is important to differentiate between current and fixed liabilities on financial statements because it allows those using the statements to assess the strength of the business in both the short-term as well as the long-term, but separately. Information about current liabilities of a company alongside its current assets give crucial information about the liquidity of a company while fixed-liabilities given together with non-current assets tells the story of the company's long-term solvency.
