= EU Customs Authority =

- The EU Customs Union

Agency overview
- Headquarters: Lille, France
- Employees: 250 once up and running
- Website: https://customs-authority.europa.eu

The European Union Customs Authority (EU Customs Authority, EUCA) is a new EU decentralised agency to be set up in Lille, France for the EU Customs Data Hub. The European Parliament and Council of the European Union decided on Lille as the seat on 25 March 2026. Nine EU countries had put forward a city to host the agency.
