= Casagrande case =

1974 EU law case

Casagrande v München
- European Court of Justice
- Full case name: Donato Casagrande v Landeshauptstadt München
- Case: 9/74
- ECLI: ECLI:EU:C:1974:74
- Nationality of parties: German

Casagrande v München (1974) Case 9/74 is an EU law case, concerning discrimination in the education system.

In 1974, the European Court of Justice ruled that the prohibitions against discrimination covered by the European Communities' treaties extended to persons in the education system. The Casagrande case (9/74) held that under Regulation 1612/68 (on the Freedom of movement for workers), Art. 12 must be interpreted as giving the children of migrant workers access to education (and provisions therefore) on the same basis as host country nationals. The court's interpretation included not only access, but also 'general measures intended to facilitate educational attendance' (para. 9).

== External references ==
- Judgment of the Court of 3 July 1974. Donato Casagrande v Landeshauptstadt München ECLI:EU:C:1974:74
- EUabc.com: Casagrande case. Accessed August 23, 2013.
- Gori, Gisella. "Towards an EU Right to Education". The Hague: Kluwer Law International, 2001.
