= List of the names of bodies of the European Union in its official languages =

This is a list of the names of the bodies of the European Union in its official languages.

Language	European Parliament	Council of the European Union	European Commission
Bulgarian	Европейски парламент (Evropejski parliament)	Съвет на Европейския съюз (Săvet na Evropejskija săjuz)	Европейска комисия (Evropejska komisija)
Croatian	Europski parliament	Vijeće Europske unije	Europska komisija
Czech	Evropský parlament	Rada Evropské Unie	Evropská komise
Danish	Europa-Parlamentet	Rådet for Den Europæiske Union	Europa-kommissionen
Dutch	Europees Parlement	Raad van de Europese Unie	Europese Commissie
English	European Parliament	Council of the European Union	European Commission
Estonian	Euroopa Parlament	Euroopa Liidu Nõukogu	Euroopa Komisjon
Finnish	Euroopan parlamentti	Euroopan unionin neuvosto	Euroopan komissio
French	Parlement européen	Conseil de l'Union européenne	Commission européenne
German	Europäisches Parlament	Rat der Europäischen Union	Europäische Kommission
Greek	Ευρωπαϊκό Κοινοβούλιο (Evropaïko Kinovulio)	Συμβούλιο της Ευρωπαϊκής Ένωσης (Simvulio tis Evropaïkis Enosis)	Ευρωπαϊκή Επιτροπή (Evropaïki Epitropi)
Hungarian	Európai Parlament	Európai Unió Tanácsa	Európai Bizottság
Irish	Parlaimint na hEorpa	Comhairle an Aontais Eorpaigh	An Comisiún Eorpach
Italian	Parlamento europeo	Consiglio dell'Unione europea	Commissione europea
Latvian	Eiropas Parliaments	Eiropas Savienības Padome	Eiropas komisija
Lithuanian	Europos Parlamentas	Europos Sajungas Taryba	Europos Komisija
Maltese	Il-Parlament Ewropew	Il-Kunsill ta' l-Unjoni Ewropea	Il-Kummissjoni Ewropea
Polish	Parlament Europejski	Rada Unii Europejskiej	Komisja Europejska
Portuguese	Parlamento Europeu	Conselho da União Europeia	Comissão Europeia
Romanian	Parlamentul European	Consiliul Uniunii Europene	Comisia Europeană
Slovak	Európsky parliament	Rada Európskej Únie	Európska Komisia
Slovenian	Evropski parliament	Svet Evropske Unije	Evropska Komisija
Spanish	Parlamento Europeo	Consejo de la Unión Europea	Comisión Europea
Swedish	Europaparlamentet	Europeiska unionens råd	Europeiska kommissionen

Language	European Court of Auditors	European Central Bank	European Ombudsman
Bulgarian	Европейска сметна палата (Evropejska smetna palata)	Европейска централна банка (Evropejska centralna banka)	Европейски омбудсман (Evropejski ombudsman)
Croatian	Europski revizorski sud	Europska središnja banka	Europski pučki pravobranitelj
Czech	Evropský účetní dvůr	Evropská centrální banka	Evropský veřejný ochránce práv
Danish	Europæiske Revisionsret	Europæiske Centralbank	Den Europæiske Ombudsmand
Dutch	Europese Rekenkamer	Europese Centrale Bank	Europese Ombudsman
English	European Court of Auditors	European Central Bank	European Ombudsman
Estonian	Euroopa Kontrollikoda	Euroopa keskpank	Euroopa ombudsman
Finnish	Euroopan tilintarkastustuomioistuin	Euroopan keskuspankki	Euroopan oikeusasiamies
French	Cour des comptes européenne	Banque Centrale Européenne	Médiateur européen
German	Europäischer Rechnungshof	Europäische Zentralbank	Europäischer Bürgerbeauftragter
Greek	Ευρωπαϊκό Ελεγκτικό Συνέδριο (Evropaïko Elenktiko Sinedhrio)	Ευρωπαϊκή Κεντρική Τράπεζα (Evropaïki Kendriki Trapeza)	Ευρωπαίος Διαμεσολαβητής (Evropeos Dhiamesolavitis)
Hungarian	Európai Számvevőszék	Európai Központi Bank	Európai Ombudsman
Irish	Cúirt lniú chórí na hEorpa	Banc Ceannais na hEorpa	An tOmbudsman Eorpach
Italian	Corte dei Conti europea	Banca Centrale europea	Mediatore europeo
Latvian	Eiropas revīzijas palāta	Eiropas Centrālā Banka	Eiropas ombudsmens
Lithuanian	Europos Audito Rūmai	Europos centrinis bankas	Europos ombudsmenas
Maltese	Il-Qorti Ewropea ta' l-Awdituri	Il-Bank Ċentrali Ewropew	L-Ombudsman Ewropew
Polish	Europejski Trybunal Obrachunkowy	Europejski Bank Centralny	Europejski Rzecznik Praw Obywatelskich
Portuguese	Tribunal de Contas Europeu	Banco Central Europeu	Provedor de Justiça Europeu
Romanian	Curtea de Conturi Europeană	Banca Centrală Europeană	Ombudsmanul European
Slovak	Európsky dvor audítorov	Európska centrálna banka	Európsky ombudsman
Slovenian	Evropsko računsko sodišče	Evropska centralna banka	Evropski varuh človekovih pravic
Spanish	Tribunal de Cuentas Europeo	Banco Central Europeo	Defensor del Pueblo Europeo
Swedish	Europeiska revisionsrätten	Europeiska centralbanken	Europeiska ombudsmannen

Language	European Data Protection Supervisor	European Investment Bank
Bulgarian	Европейски надзорен орган по защита на данните	Европейска инвестиционен банка
Croatian	Europski nadzornik zaštite podataka	Europska investicijska banka
Czech	Evropský inspektor ochrany údajů	Evropská investiční banka
Danish	Den Europæiske Tilsynsførende for Databeskyttelse	Den Europæiske Investeringsbank
Dutch	De Europese Toezichthouder voor gegevensbescherming	Europese Investeringsbank
English	European Data Protection Supervisor	European Investment Bank
Estonian	Euroopa andmekaitseinspektor	Euroopa Investeerimispank
Finnish	Euroopan tietosuojavaltuutettu	Euroopan investointipankki
French	Le contrôleur européen de la protection des données	Banque européen d'investissement
German	Der Europäische Datenschutzbeauftragte	Europäische Investitionsbank
Greek	Ευρωπαίος επόπτης προστασίας των δεδομένων	Ευρωπαϊκή Τράπεζα Επενδύσεων
Hungarian	Európai Adatvédelmi Biztos	Európai Beruházási Bank
Irish	Maoirseoir ar Chosaint Sonraí Eorpacha	An Banc Eorpach Infheistíochta
Italian	Garante europeo della protezione dei dati	Banca europea per gli investimenti
Latvian	Eiropas datu aizsardzības uzraudzītājs	Eiropas Investīciju Banka
Lithuanian	Europos duomen u apsaugos prieži u ros pareig u nas	Europos Investicijų Bankas
Maltese	Kontrollur Ewropew għall-Protezzjoni tad-Data	Il-Bank Ewropew għall-Investiment
Polish	Europejski Inspektor Ochrony Danych	Europejski Bank Inwestycyjny
Portuguese	Autoridade Europeia para a Proteção de Dados	Banco Europeu de Investimento
Romanian	Authoritatea Europeană pentru Protecția Datelor	Banca Europeană de Investiții
Slovak	Európsky dozorný úradník pre ochranu údajov	Európska investičná banka
Slovenian	Evropski nadzornik za varstvo podatkov	Evropska investicijska banka
Spanish	Supervisor Europeo de Protección de Datos	Banco Europeo de Inversiones
Swedish	Europeiska datatillsynsmannen	Europeiska investeringsbanken
