= European Education and Culture Executive Agency =

Executive agency of the European Commission

- Abbreviation: EACEA
- Formation: January 2006
- Type: European Agency
- Headquarters: Brussels, Belgium
- Members: 27 countries
- Parent organisation: European Commission
- Website: EACEA

The European Education and Culture Executive Agency (formerly the Education, Audiovisual and Culture Executive Agency), or EACEA, is an executive agency of the European Commission located in Brussels, Belgium. It manages parts of the European Commission's funding programmes in education, culture, media, sport, youth, citizenship and humanitarian aid. EACEA has been operational since January 2006.

== Organisation ==
EACEA is supervised by six Directorates-General of the European Commission:

- Education, Youth, Sport and Culture (DG EAC)
- Communications Networks, Content and Technology (DG CNECT)
- Justice and Consumers (DG JUST)
- International Partnerships (DG INTPA)
- Neighbourhood and Enlargement Negotiations (DG NEAR)
- Employment, Social Affairs & Inclusion (DG EMPL)

Under the EU long-term budget for 2021–2027, EACEA manages parts of the following funding programmes:

- Erasmus+
- Creative Europe
- European Solidarity Corps
- Citizens, Equality, Rights and Values (CERV)
- Intra-Africa Academic Mobility Scheme

Additionally, EACEA supervises the Eurydice network (producing analysis and comparable data on education systems and policies in Europe) and the Youth Wiki (an online encyclopedia of national youth policies across Europe). EACEA also continues to manage projects funded during the 2014–2020 programming period. As of 1 February 2024, the director of EACEA is Sophie Beernaerts.
