= European Training Foundation =

Agency of the European Union

Agency overview
- Formed: 30 November 1993
- Jurisdiction: European Union
- Headquarters: Turin, Italy
- Agency executives: Pilvi Torsti, Director; Joost Korte, Chair of the Governing Board
- Key document: Regulation (EC) No 1339/2008
- Website: etf.europa.eu

The European Training Foundation (ETF) is the EU agency working to improve the skills and employability of people in partner countries outside the EU. The ETF does not itself train or qualify people. It helps countries and institutions outside the EU to develop skills.

The agency gives advice and support on professional education policy, programmes, and practice to governments, social partners, and training providers in countries ranging from Morocco to Kazakhstan and from Belarus to Jordan [link to list below].

The ETF is based in Turin, Italy. It is primarily funded from the EU budget with an annual allocation (2023) of around €22.6M.

Approximately 130 staff work at the ETF offices. They represent most EU member states and some of the non-EU partner countries.

== History ==
A blueprint for the ETF was made immediately following the fall of the Iron Curtain and the Berlin Wall in 1989. The plan for its establishment was originally part of a two-pronged European plan to support people development in the hectic transition period of central and eastern Europe in the 1990s. The TEMPUS programme would support higher education development, while the European Training Foundation would support technical and professional education. Money for both was earmarked in the fund for the PHARE programme.

The Tempus Programme got off the ground in Poland and Hungary almost immediately, but the launch of the ETF got caught up in the decentralisation process that was underway to bring the EU closer to its citizens.

It took until 1995 for the ETF to get established in Turin. By that time, the Soviet Union had disintegrated into 14 independent countries, the European Economic Community had become the European Union and association agreements had already been signed with Poland, Hungary, Romania, Bulgaria, Czechia and Slovakia. From the outset, therefore, a considerable part of the work of the ETF would be to prepare the ever-growing list of candidate countries for meeting the EU accession requirements.

In September 1998, the European Commission asked the ETF to manage the Special Preparatory Programme for the European Social Fund (SPP-ESF). The project formed part of a PHARE package of €60 million support funds that would help prospective EU member states in central and eastern Europe to develop the necessary institutions for dealing with the legal environment of the EU and to prepare for access to the EU Structural Funds.

Over the years, the focus of the work of the ETF has shifted from technical assistance to policy advice. The geographical scope of the ETF was extended with the Balkan countries that emerged from the disintegrated Yugoslavia, as well as North Africa, the near Middle East and the former Soviet states in central Asia.

== Torino Process ==
Fifteen years of networking activities of the ETF eventually led, in 2010, to the launch of the Torino Process, a biennial reporting exercise through which countries share their progress in training for skills. The Torino Process has elements of competition as well as mutual learning – what the ETF refers to as policy learning – and has stood the test of time since its inception.

== ETF work on green skills ==
In recent years, one of the thrusts of the ETF’s work has been skills for the green transition.

The ETF’s annual Green Skills Awards3 were launched in 2021 to provide ideas and inspiration supporting the reform of education and training for a greener future. The awards showcase examples of tried and tested methods from all over the globe as well as innovative approaches to skills development that support the green transition.

In the first edition of the Green Skills Award, there were 134 applications from 39 countries. More than 23,000 members of the public participated in the online public vote to decide the winner.

== ETF support to skills for the digital age ==
Another focal area is training for a digital world. The ETF uses EU templates, such as SELFIE4, which is a free tool that can be customised to help schools assess their level of digital learning. Developing the digital competences of teachers and trainers through their continuous professional development is another important part of this process.

The ETF works with policymakers in partner countries to ensure a coherent policy framework for enhancing digital skills for inclusion. Monitoring activities, such as the Torino Process, help countries to invest in areas that most need development.

== ETF support to Ukraine ==
Since the Russian invasion of Ukraine, the ETF has used its longstanding and extensive contacts in Kyiv and other communities to support the skill challenges of the war.

Within weeks of the February 2022 invasion, the ETF had set up a Ukrainian Resource Hub. Designed to help often traumatised refugees find their way in host countries across Europe, more than 16,000 people have accessed the site’s advice and links.

The hub, which features links to language training, advice on accessing education and training, and how to get Ukrainian qualifications and experience recognised or validated in the EU, is open to both Ukrainian visitors and employers, officials and others from EU member states seeking information on how they can help Ukrainians, or what they can expect when engaging with Ukrainians in education, training and employment.

== List of ETF partner countries ==
- Albania
- Algeria
- Armenia
- Azerbaijan
- Belarus
- Bosnia and Herzegovina
- Egypt
- Georgia
- Israel
- Jordan
- Kazakhstan
- Kosovo
- Kyrgyzstan
- Lebanon
- Libya
- Moldova
- Montenegro
- Morocco
- North Macedonia
- Palestine
- Serbia
- Syria
- Tajikistan
- Tunisia
- Turkey
- Turkmenistan
- Ukraine
- Uzbekistan

The ETF also works in sub-Saharan Africa on some very specific activities.

== ETF directors since 1995 ==
- Peter de Rooij (NL, 1994–2004)
- Muriel Dunbar, (UK, 2004–2009)
- Madlen Serban, (RO, 2009–2017)
- Cesare Onestini (IT, 2017–2022)
- Xavier Matheu (interim) (ES, 2022–2023)
- Pilvi Torsti (FI, 2023–)
