= Long-term liabilities =

Liabilities that are due beyond a year or the normal operation period of the company

Long-term liabilities, or non-current liabilities, are liabilities that are due beyond a year or the normal operation period of the company. The normal operation period is the amount of time it takes for a company to turn inventory into cash. On a classified balance sheet, liabilities are separated between current and long-term liabilities to help users assess the company's financial standing in short-term and long-term periods. Long-term liabilities give users more information about the long-term prosperity of the company, while current liabilities inform the user of debt that the company owes in the current period. On a balance sheet, accounts are listed in order of liquidity, so long-term liabilities come after current liabilities. In addition, the specific long-term liability accounts are listed on the balance sheet in order of liquidity. Therefore, an account due within eighteen months would be listed before an account due within twenty-four months.

== Examples ==
Examples of long-term liabilities are bonds payable, long-term loans, capital leases, pension liabilities, post-retirement healthcare liabilities, deferred compensation, deferred revenues, deferred income taxes, and derivative liabilities.

== Exceptions ==
If a liability is currently due in fewer than 12 months and is in the process of being refinanced so that it is due after a year, then a company can record this debt in long-term investments. Additionally, if a liability is to be covered by a long-term investment, it can be recorded as a long-term liability even if it is due in the current period. Still, the long-term investment must be sufficient to cover the debt.

== See also ==
- Fixed liability
- Creditor falling due after more than one year
