= Advisory bodies to the European Union =

EU Organisation

The advisory bodies to the European Union are part of the wider set of bodies of the European Union and Euratom, created in primary law by the treaties that constitute the EU but which lie outside the Union's main institutional structure.

These bodies have no legislative or other decision-making power. Their main role is to advise the European Commission, Council of the European Union and European Parliament on legislative and policy proposals.

These bodies include:

Advisory bodies of the European Union

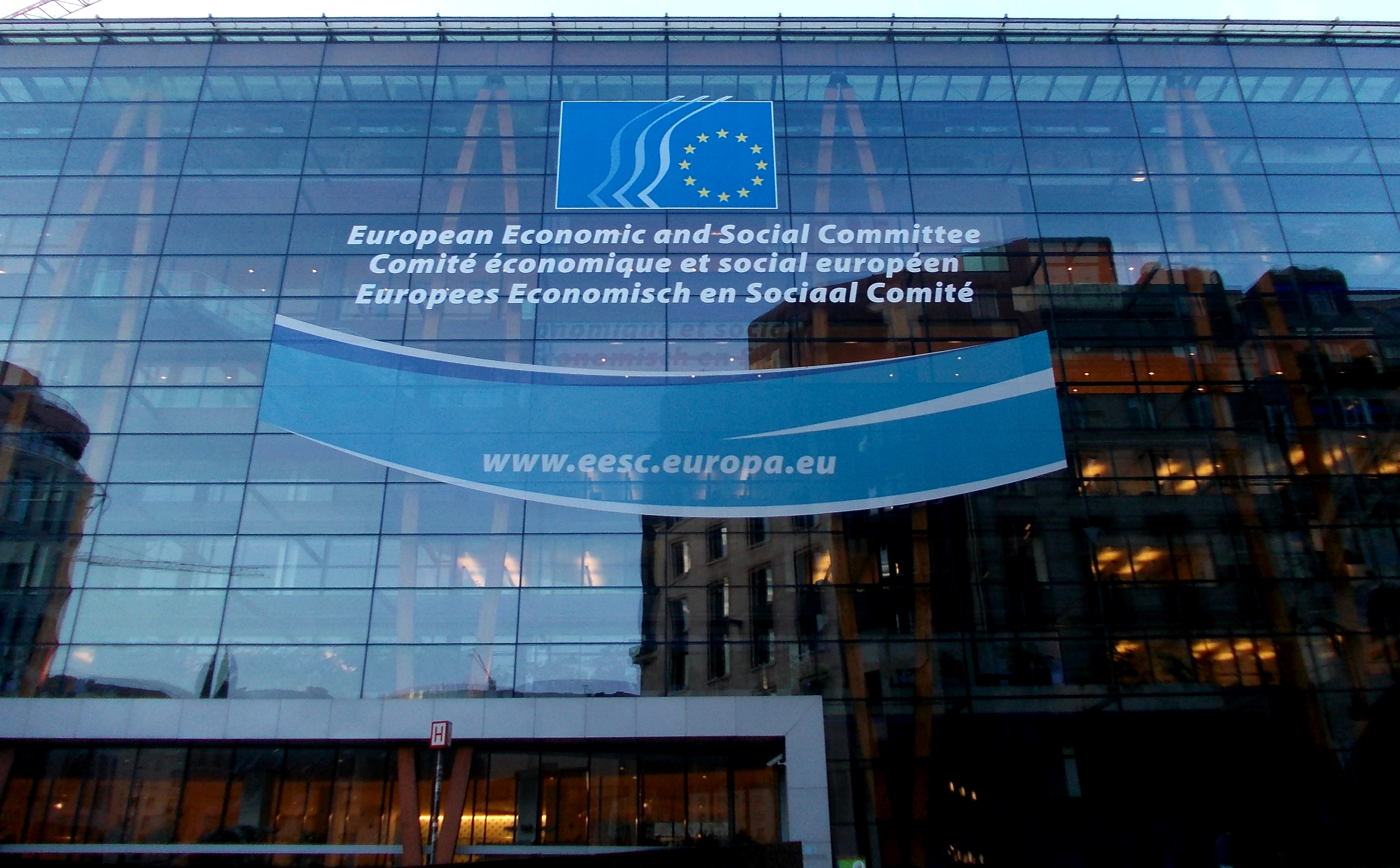
European Economic and Social Committee

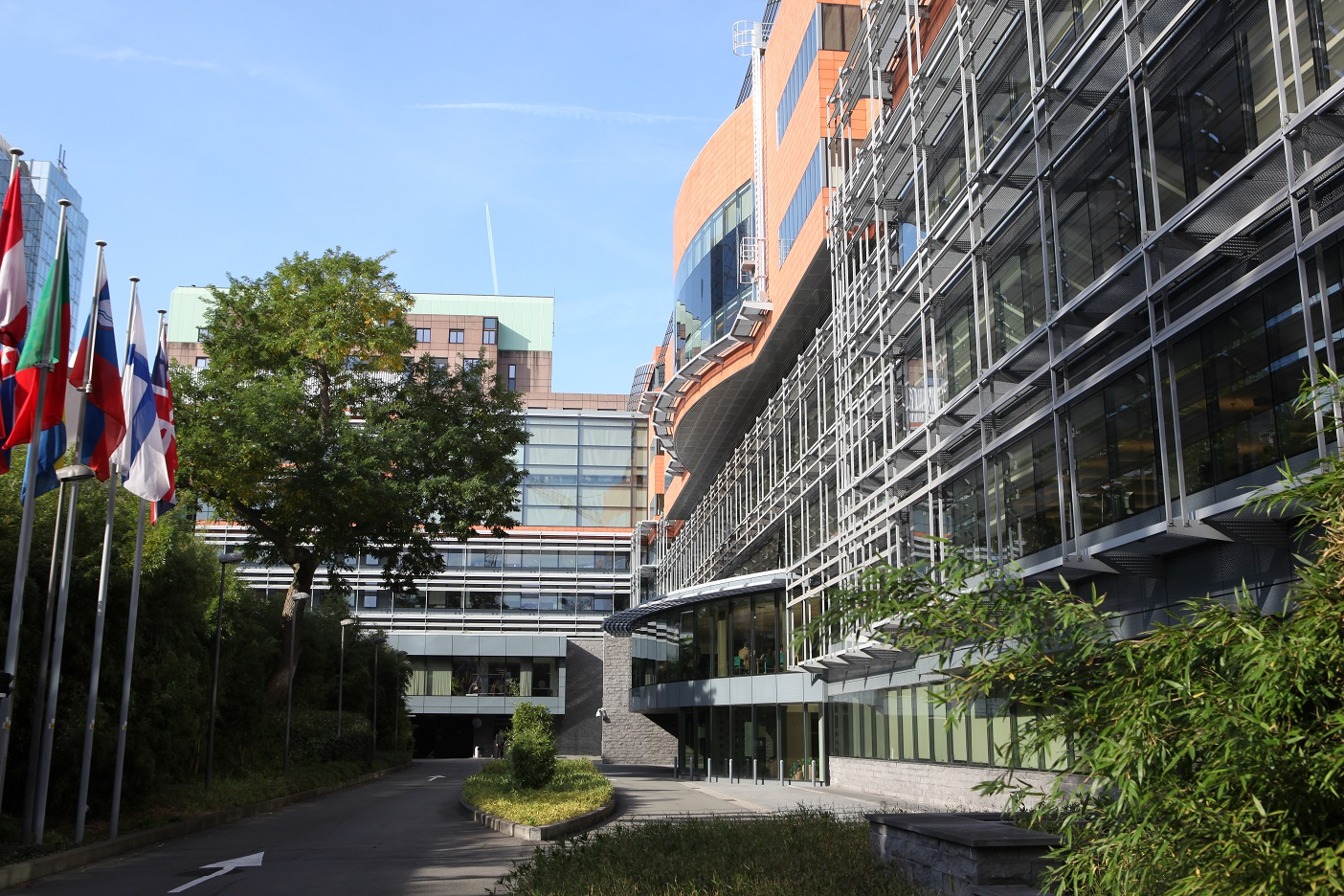
European Committee of the Regions

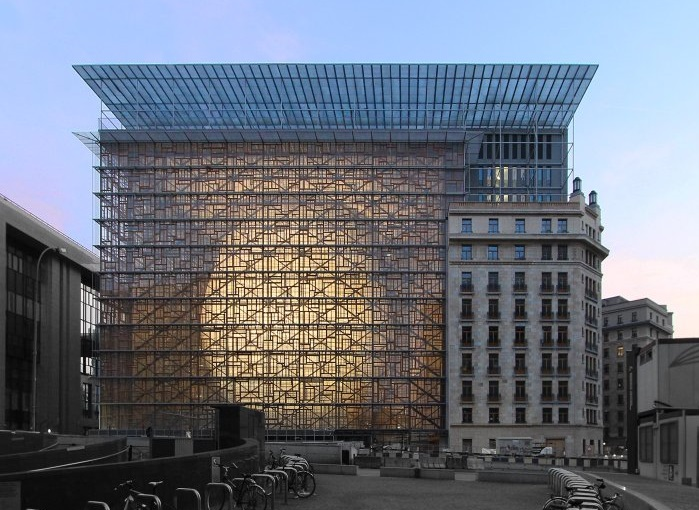
Political and Security Committee

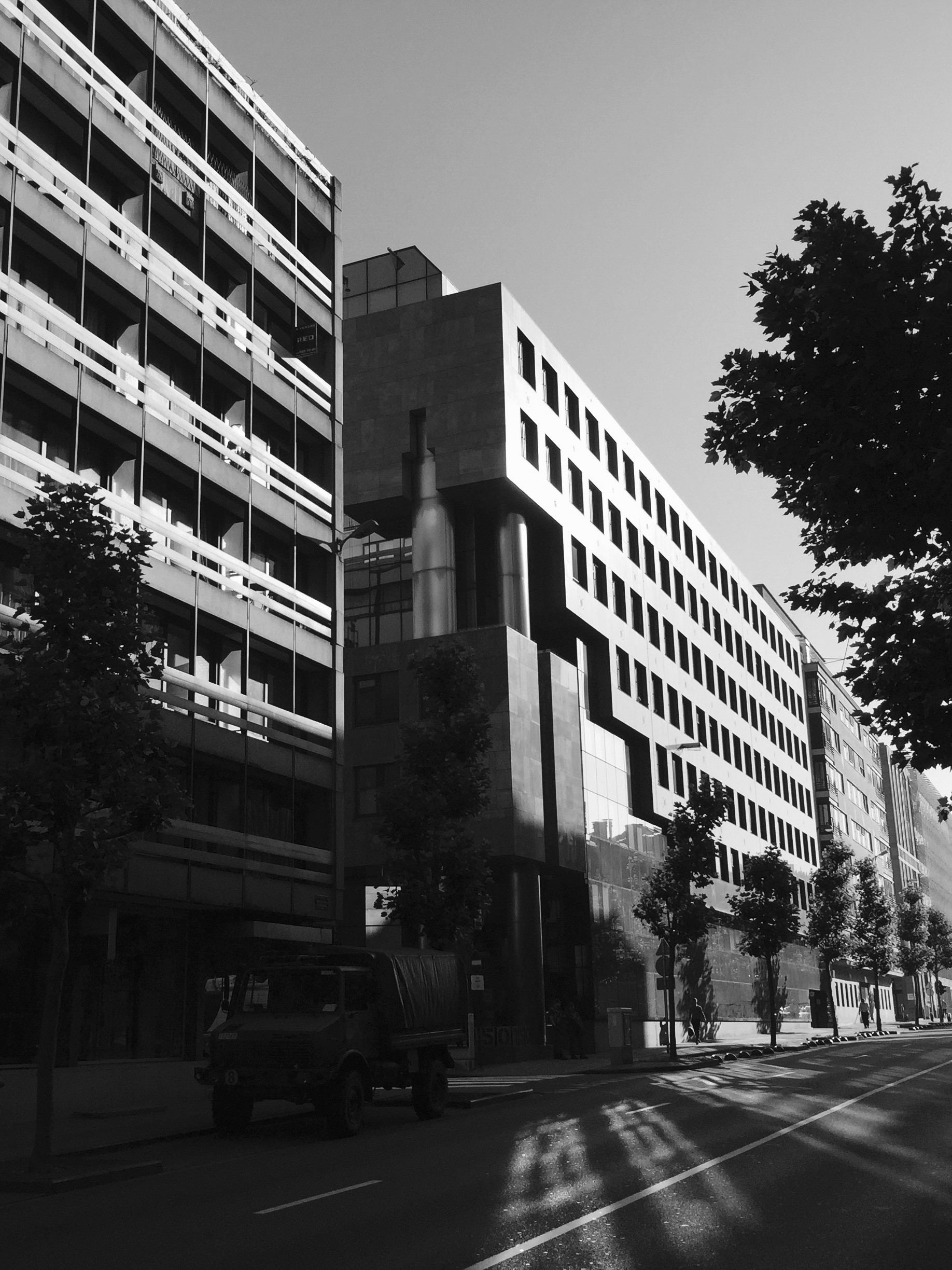
European Union Military Committee
