= Dwarf beech =

Beech cultivar group

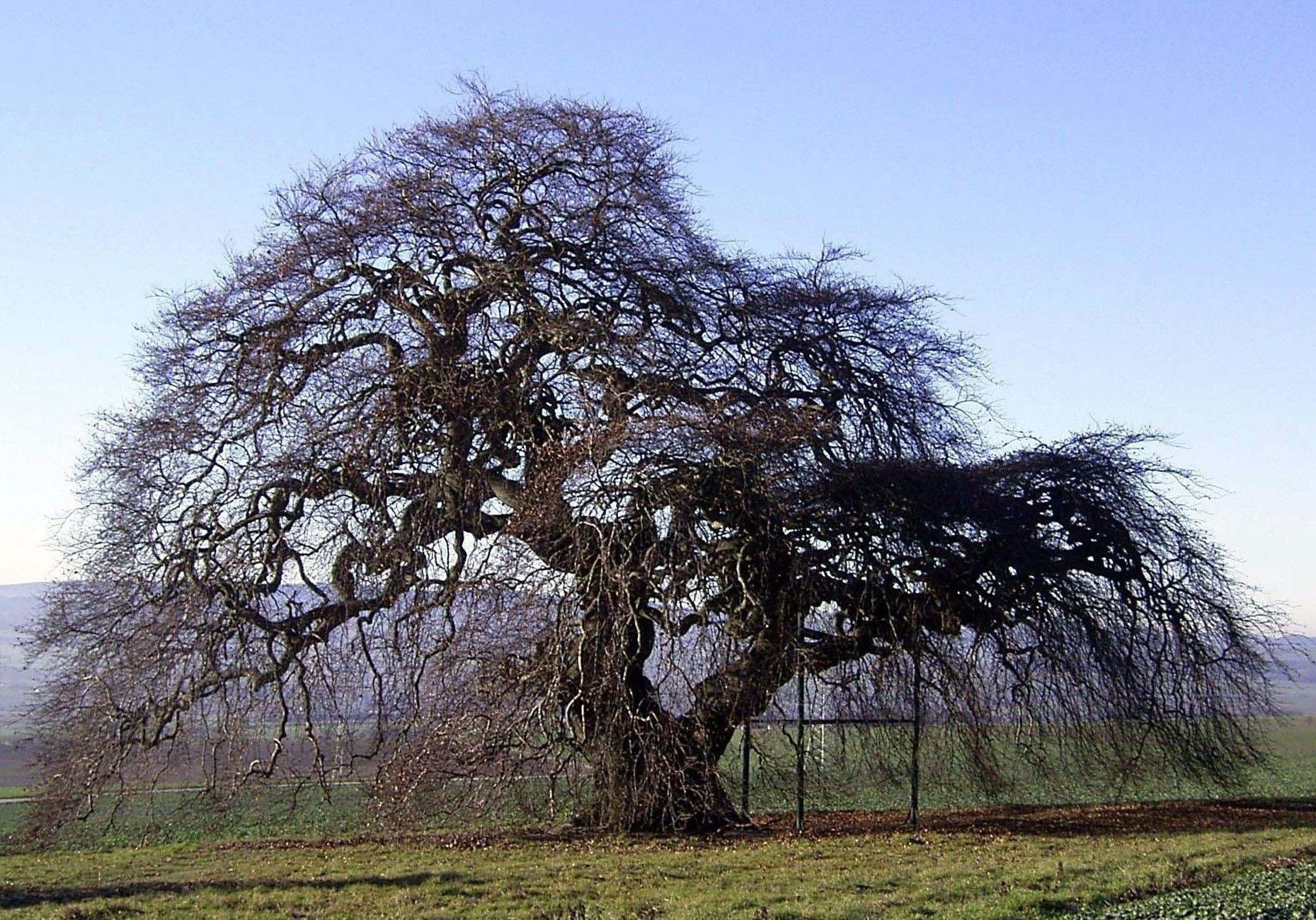
- The dwarf beech known as the "Kopfbuche" ("Head Beech") in Bad Gandersheim in 2003. It has since then largely collapsed.
- Species: F. sylvatica
- Cultivar group: Tortuosa Group

The dwarf beech, Fagus sylvatica Tortuosa Group, is a rare cultivar group of the European beech with fewer than 1500 older specimens in Europe. It is also known as twisted beech or parasol beech.

It is a wide-spreading tree with distinctive twisted and contorted branches that are quite pendulous at their ends. With its short and twisted trunk the Dwarf Beech grows more in width than height, only seldom reaching a height of more than 15 metres. It sometimes grows from seed and has formed colonies in Sweden (where it is known as "Vresbok"), Denmark ("Vrange bøge"), Germany ("Süntel-Buchen"), France ("Faux de Verzy") and Italy ("Alberi serpente", nel Monte Pollino).

A similar form is the weeping beech (Fagus sylvatica Pendula Group), which has more pendulous branching.

== Distribution ==
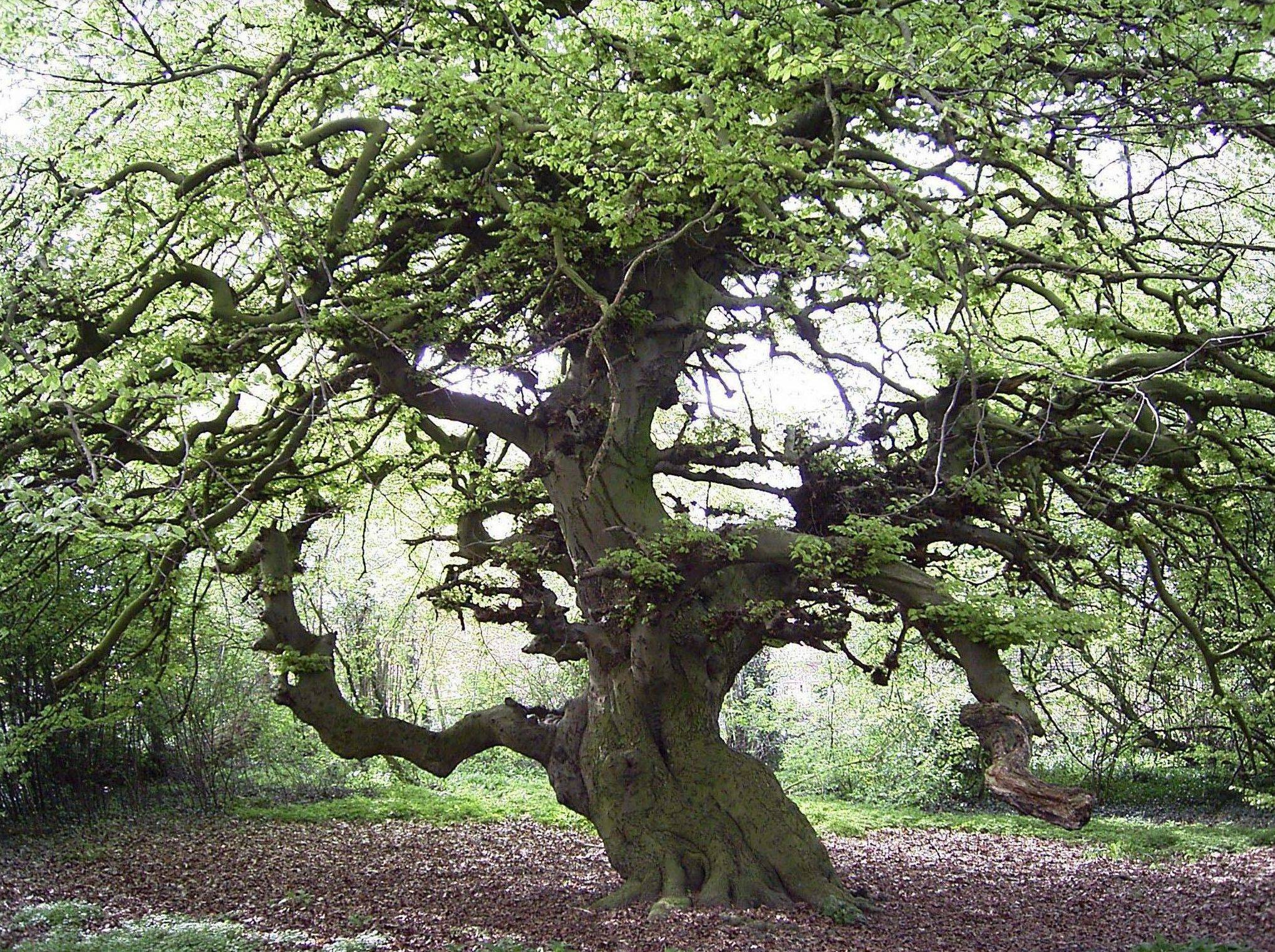
200-year-old dwarf beech in Lauenau.

=== Germany ===
Until the middle of the 19th century, the largest dwarf beech forest in Europe was in the Süntel. The Süntel is a small massif north of Hamelin in Lower Saxony in Germany. During the course of land reform in 1843 the entire area of a 245-meter high hill between Hülsede and Raden was cleared. At that time the number of dwarf beeches in Germany fell from several thousand to under a hundred. Individual older specimens or small groups of trees can only be found in about 50 locations today. The number of dwarf beeches have been increased by numerous new plantings in recent decades.

The largest dwarf beeches in Germany are in Lauenau and in the Berggarten botanical garden in Hannover. In Bad Nenndorf there is a "Dwarf Beech Avenue" made up of almost 100 trees, two-thirds of which are basal shoots. The "Head Beech" in Bad Gandersheim, which was considered one of the largest dwarf beeches at the beginning of the 21st century (2003), has since largely collapsed despite intensive tree care measures.

Dwarf beeches are also commonly found among the Wiehen Hills. A well known example of this tree species stands today on the Eidinghauser hill and is named "Krause Buche" ("Ruffle Beech") due to its striking growth. A second, smaller beech grows nearby. These trees provide evidence that the dwarf beech was once spread from the Süntel over the Wesergebirge to the Wiehen Hills. Regardless, the German name "Süntelbuche" is not incorrect because formerly the Wiehen Hills, the Wesergebirge, and the Süntel were all officially referred to as "the Süntel".

=== Outside of Germany ===
Smaller groups of older dwarf beeches still exist in France (where they are known as Hêtre tortillard), Denmark (Vrange bøge), and Sweden (Vresbok). Younger trees can be found in many parks and botanic gardens throughout Europe and the United States.

In a 1998 census of trees a population of more than 800 dwarf beeches was found in the Verzy forest, 25 km southeast of Reims, in France (where the trees are called Faux de Verzy). Since then the number has been reduced slightly. The most beautiful specimens have been separated and have become tourist attractions along a circular path in a park-like area.

== Dwarf Beech Reserve of the Heimatbund Niedersachsen ==
Around 1990 the local Bad Münder branch of the Heimatbund Niedersachsen Registered Association created an 11,000 m^{2} dwarf beech reserve above the localities of Nettelrede and Luttringhausen. The property, which was initially leased by the Bad Münder local branch, was bought by the Heimatbund Niedersachsen on 27 September 2010. Young dwarf beeches can grow to maturity protected in the reserve. The sustainable nature protection project serves exclusively to preserve and reproduce this rare tree species. Within these dwarf beeches there is a high genetic diversity, which is important for reproduction. In addition, due to its isolated location, the reserve avoids genetic mixing with the European beech.

The reserve was surveyed with a theodolite. It was possible to precisely record the location of every beech and to number the individual trees. The survey plan became the basis for maintenance work and scientific research.

== Biology ==
=== Age ===
The age of dwarf beeches is often overestimated due to their gnarled growth. Their average age limit is between 120 and 160 years. The horizontal, static unfavorable growth seems to accelerate the breakup of old rotten trees, so that dwarf beeches never reach 300 years of age. The only old trees with well known ages are the Tilly-Buche in Auetal (255 years) and the dwarf beech in the castle park of Haus Weitmar in Bochum (270 years).

=== Growth patterns ===
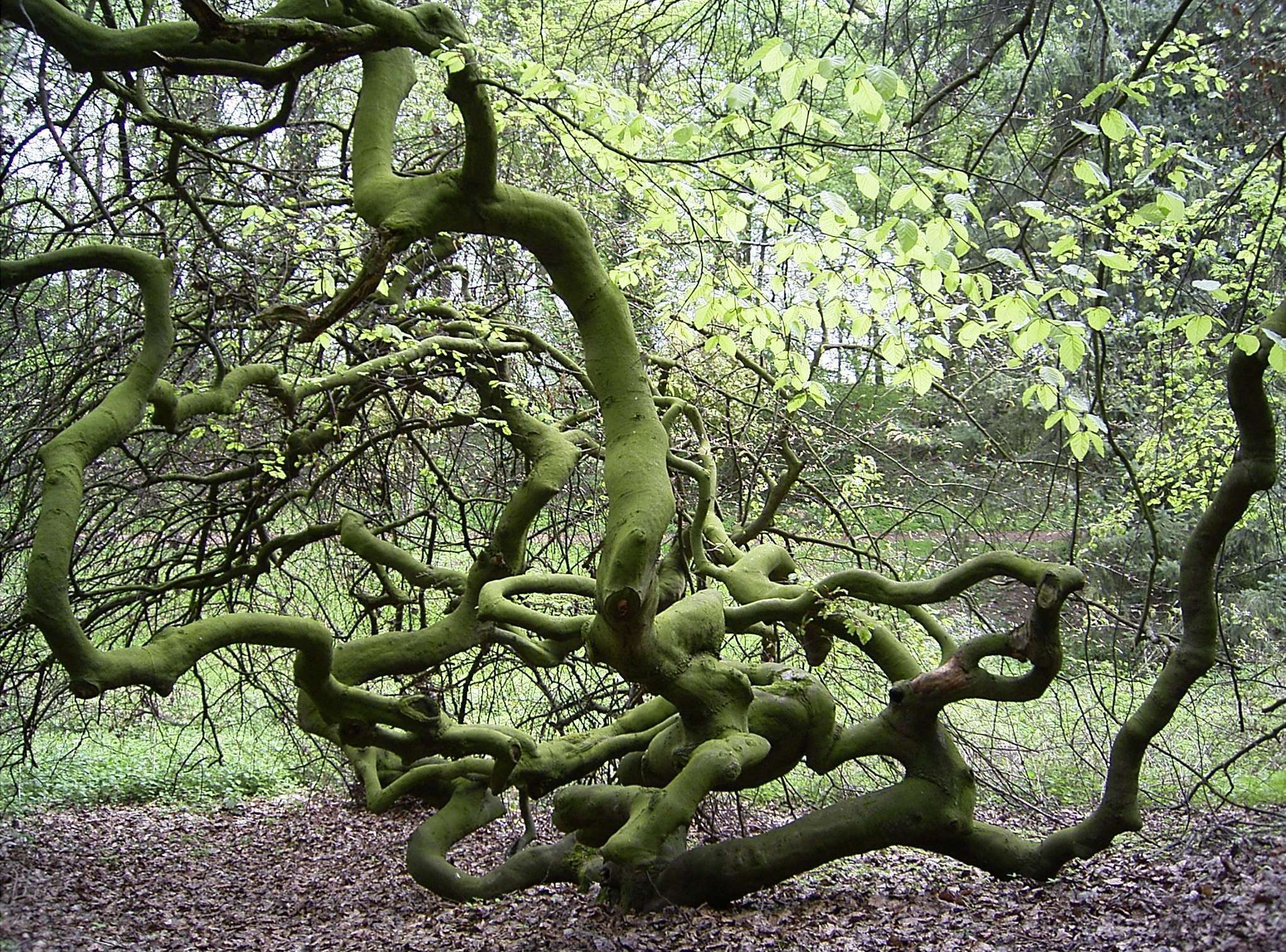
Dwarf Beech trunkless "bush form".

The greatest difference to the normal form is in the peculiar growth of the roots, trunk, and branches of the dwarf beech. The trees have been described as twisted, snaked, corkscrewed, kinked, kneed, zig-zagged, or simply stunted growth. The cross-sections of trunks show deep furrows and bulges and are not circular. This can be called a backward tension trunk. They resemble elephant feet and are sometimes hardly higher than 2 meters even in old specimens. Occasionally, there are entirely trunkless "bush forms". Often there are "sinkers", or side branches that extend below the surface of the earth from the main trunk which resurface after a few meters. Older individuals, like the dwarf beech in the mountain garden of the Herrenhausen Gardens, give the impression of being a group of trees.

In addition, dwarf beeches show a slight "mourning form". The branches in the outer crown area droop, but not so strongly as in the weeping beech. The branches in the upper middle part of the crown, on the other hand, are usually erect and give the crown a scruffy appearance.

The tree shape can also be influenced by finishing techniques, for example through "high stem-finishing". The growth of the dwarf beech also depends on location, which affects competition, shade, nutrients, wind, and so on.

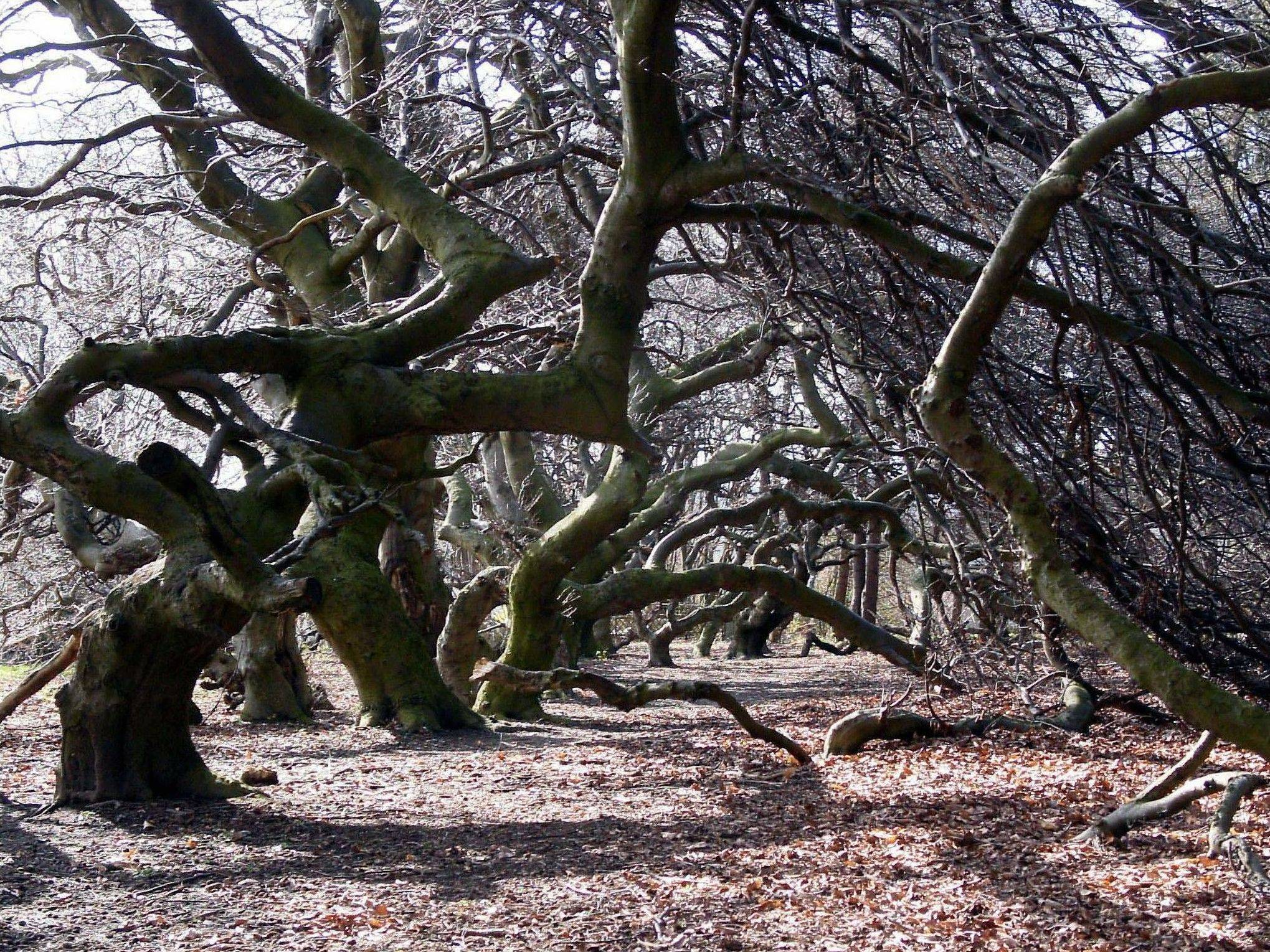
"Dwarf Beech Avenue" in Bad Nenndorf.

Flowers, leaves, fruit, and bark, as well as the strength of the wood, correspond with the species (European beech). However, the leaves and fruit show a greater variation in size and shape than in the European beech. Other striking characteristics are the arrangement of the buds, the occasional curved buds and double terminal buds at the branch tips, and the strong tendency to develop basal shoots, especially in trees that are transported when young. The typical European beech roots are strongly distorted in the dwarf beech due to its stunted growth. As a result, individual roots come to the surface more often and form basal shoots that grow into new, mostly long, undivided, and snake-growing stems.

==== Dwarf beech variations ====
Possibilities for variation in the dwarf beech include the growth patterns and the leaf shape and color. Crosses with other leaf varieties of the European beech are desirable, but have only succeeded in the copper beech. Red-leaved dwarf beeches, called blood-dwarf-beeches (F. sylvatica var. Tortousa Purpurea or "red-dwarf"), have existed since 1967.

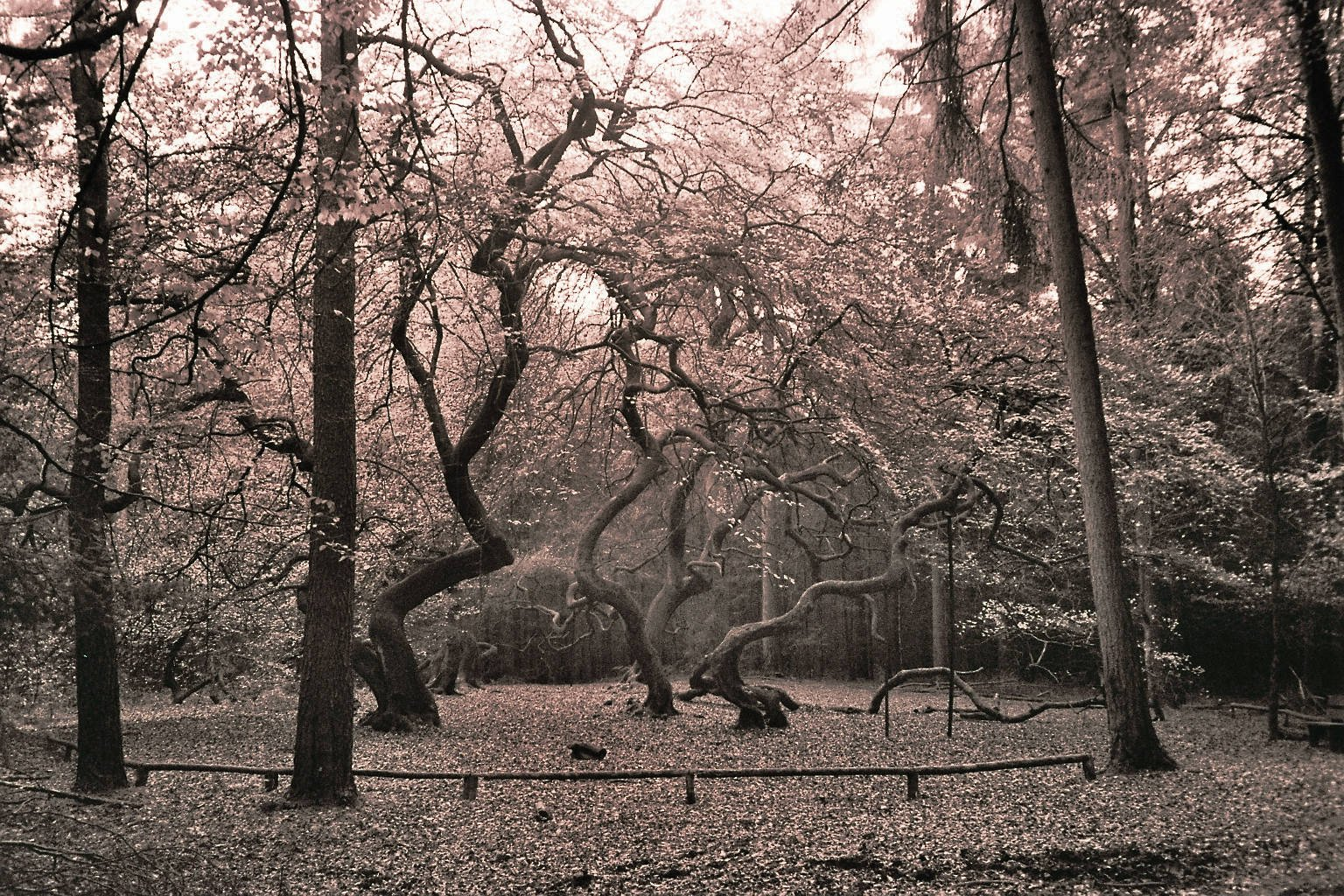
Dwarf beech group in the Hohe Mark Nature Park.

The variety of shapes of the dwarf beech has often led to desire for further subdivision, but this has not yet led to any satisfactory results. For example, dwarf beeches with clear deviations in habit have been given new names, even when the particular shape was not yet reproduced and remained unclear, or whether the shape of the young tree was retained in old age or not.

For some variations there is only a single example. The flat-crowned tree of the Tabuliformis (table beech) type in the Flora Botanical Garden in Cologne described by Gerd Krüssmann in 1939 in the Messages of the German Dendrological Society (Deutsche Dendrologische Gesellschaft) is one such unique example. Another divergent form that grows completely flat above ground is the Horizontalis, known as Londal in Denmark. The Remyllyensis form, first described in 1869 and originating in France, could be an intermediate form between the dwarf and weeping beech.

Further dwarf beech forms are ‘Bornyensis’, ‘Pagnyensis’, ‘Retroflexa’, ‘Arcuata’, ‘Conglomerata’, ‘Umbraculifera’, among others. The classification of these forms is unclear and disputed.

==== Similar beech shapes ====
A very similar European beech subspecies is the weeping beech. It has many similarities, although it grows more upright and less twisted and its branches have a more pronounced hanging shape. When dwarf and weeping beeches deviate greatly from their usual, even knowledgeable dendrologists have difficulty with proper classification.

Beeches similar in form to dwarf beeches that are not of the same subspecies include browsed "hood beeches", storm-tossed "stunted beeches" on the coast and in the mountains, and often-pruned "head beeches" which owe their dwarf beech-like forms to external influences and do not pass them on.

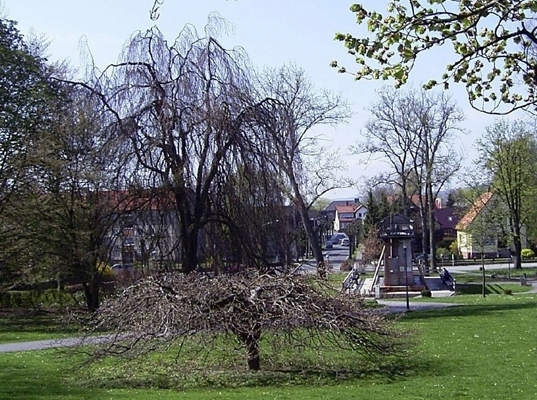
Large weeping beech and young dwarf beech.

The growth forms mentioned above are isolated and less pronounced in every normal beech forest.

=== Reproduction and propagation ===
Biologically, the dwarf beech barely differs from the normal European beech. Thus both trees can fertilize each other, which makes dwarf beeches unpopular with forest owners who want to grow straight wood-producing trees.

Dwarf beeches are cross-pollinators, which means self-fertilization of these monoicous trees is not possible. They must be fertilized by another tree, either a common European beech or another dwarf beech. Concerning the beechnuts of dwarf beeches, which are always pollinated by common European beeches because their pollen is everywhere in the air, they produce common European beeches, dwarf beeches, and hybrids in different numbers without sharp distinctions between one another. Between 10 and over 70 percent of seedlings are crooked.

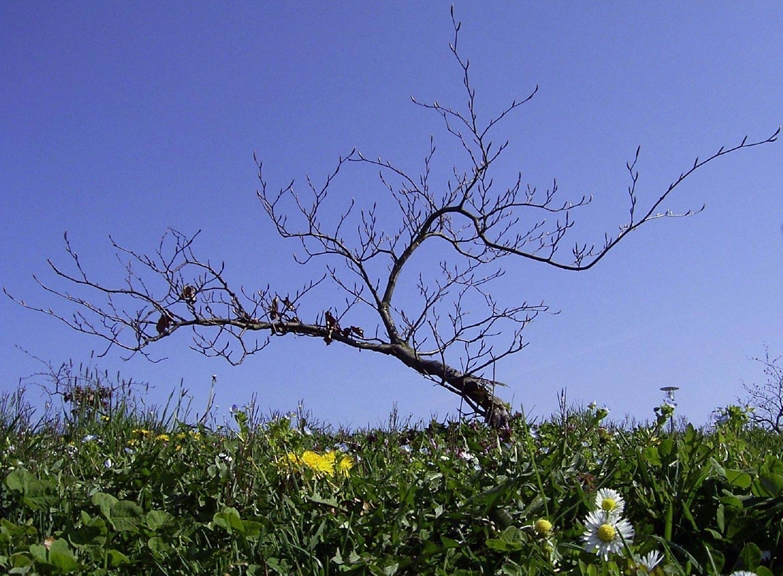
Young dwarf beech (graft).

Only after 5 to 10 years can one see clearly enough whether a young plant is a proper dwarf beech or not. This is why seedlings are very rarely available for purchase. Grafts, on the other hand, are available more and more frequently. Because of this, new plantings of dwarf beeches in the last few decades were made mainly with grafts of other beech trees. The nicest looking trees were reproduced almost exclusively, which could lead to a reduction of the dwarf beech's gene pool in the future.

Additionally, dwarf beeches frequently propagate by means of layering and basal shoots. In this way branches lying on the ground take root, or rather, roots growing near the surface produce new shoots.

When planting young dwarf beeches, one should take into account their very slow growth rates (5 to 10 cm per year) and their large space requirements. The dwarf beech and its low, almost horizontally growing branches that hang down to the ground covers a circle of up to 25 m in diameter with its crown. Roadsides and property boundaries are therefore not suitable locations.

== Economic use ==
The dwarf beech's twisted and curved wood cannot be used commercially. Because of the twisted growth, the wood is very difficult to split along the grain with an axe or saw and, because of its crookedness, it is difficult to stack so that it is unsuitable even as firewood. The value of the dwarf beech lies alone in its importance as an ornamental tree in parks, gardens, and other public places.

== Cultural significance ==
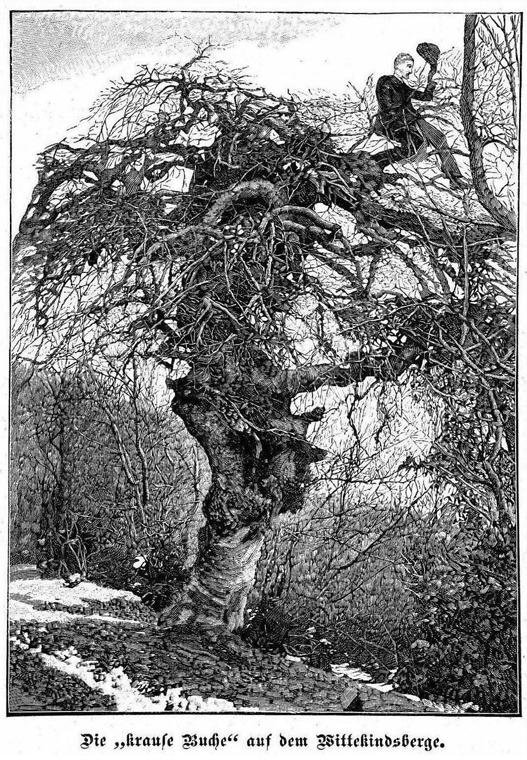
"Krause Buche" ("Ruffle Beech"), wood engraving from 1890.

=== Well-known examples in Germany ===
Some noteworthy dwarf beeches which have reached a great age or have shown a particularly beautiful growth have become well-known and impressive natural monuments, and have also made their way into relevant literature.

These include:

- "Krause Buche" ("Ruffle Beech") the oldest tree in Bochum in the Haus Weitmar park, in the Wiehen Hills;
- a second tree also called "Krause Buche" on Eidinghause Mountain, also in the Wiehen hills;
- "Parapluie-Buchen" ("Umbrella Beech") of Paderborn;
- "Krausbäumchen" ("Little Ruffle Beech") of Bad Homburg vor der Höhe
- "Kanzelbuche" ("Pulpit Beech") on the Stromberg;
- "Süntelbuche" ("Dwarf Beech") in the Berggarten in Hannover; and
- "Kopfbuche" ("Head Beech") near Bad Gandersheim.

The most well-known dwarf beech was the "Tilly-Buche" (1739–1994) near Raden on the Süntel, which was greatly influential to the local area and today is represented on the coat of arms of Auetal. Its roots served as inspiration for advertisements of Lacalut Toothpaste, and its enormous size inspired artists to make drawings, oil paintings, photographs, fables, and poems. For more than a century, its unclear history led scientists to speculate, sometimes daringly, about the origin of the monstrous beech.

The coat of arms of the municipality of Auetal, Germany, features a dwarf beech.

Fascination with such examples can only be expected of special specimens or larger groups ("fairy tale forest", "magic forest", etc.). Smaller beech trees are not more noticed than comparable forms of corkscrew hazels, acacias, larches, or willows. For centuries, dwarf beech seedlings were considered useless and weeded out during thinning of European beech stands.

In the Semper forest park, in the north of Lietzow on the island of Rügen, there are ten dwarf beeches that form a dome-like grove. These were planted in 1920 and are a protected natural monument.

In addition, there are the former Forest Plant Garden and today's International Phenological Garden of the Dresden University of Technology near the Hartha spa in the Tharandt Forest and the Forstbotanischer Garten Tharandt, where these supra-regionally known dwarf beeches are dealt with scientifically.

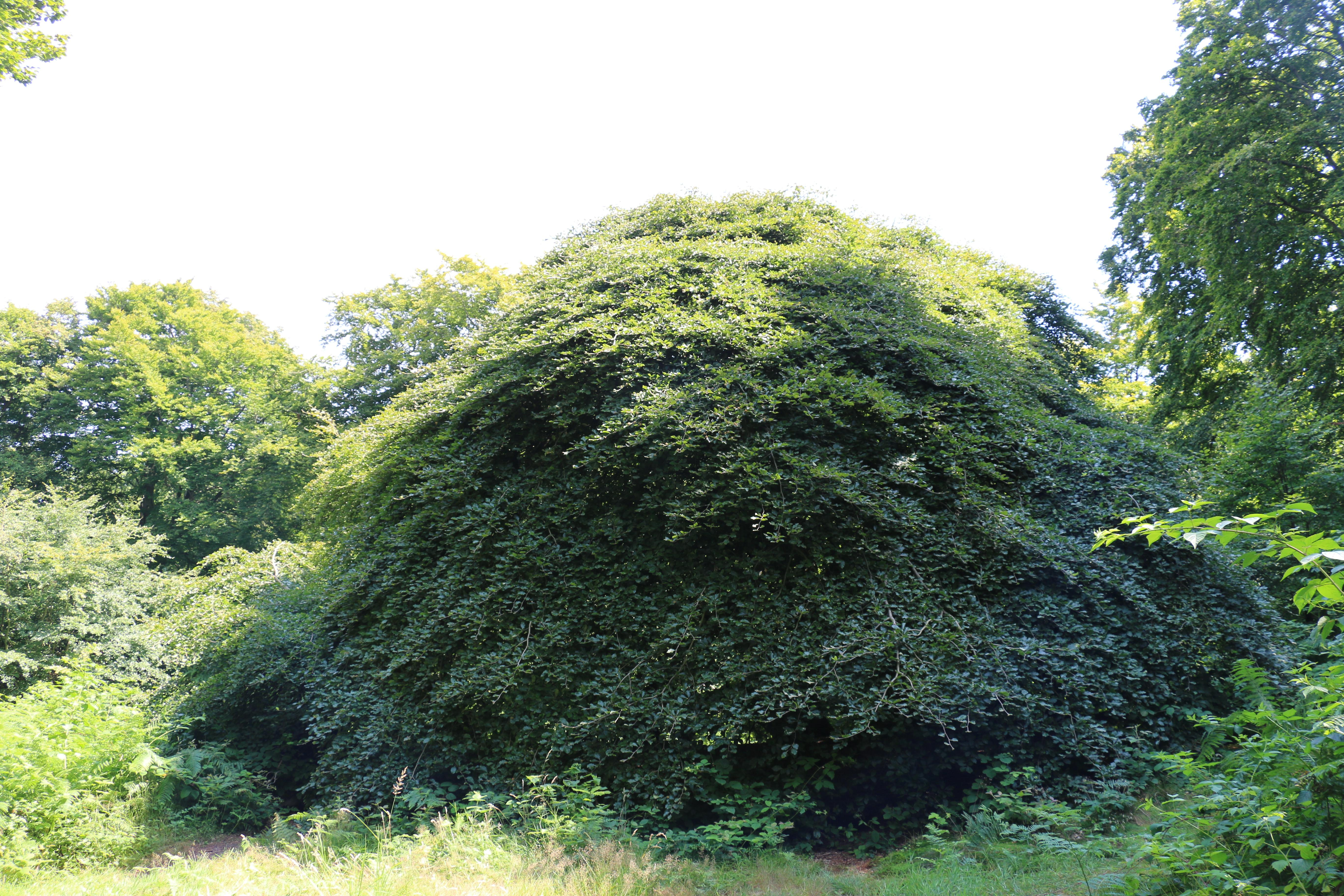
Canopy of the dwarf beech in the Schlosspark Semper.

=== Dwarf beeches in France ===
There is a dwarf beech specimen in a forest north of the village of Sionne (Vosges department).

A collection of up to 800 specimens have been identified in Verzy (Faux de Verzy).

=== Research history ===
In the 1844 work Pfeils Kritische Blätter für Forst- und Jagdwissenschaft (edition 19, book 1, page 223), chief forester Tilemann in Eschede reported dwarf beeches for the first time in a section called "Concerning the abnormal growth of the beech in the Hülsede local forest, Lauenau Office in the Kingdom of Hannover":

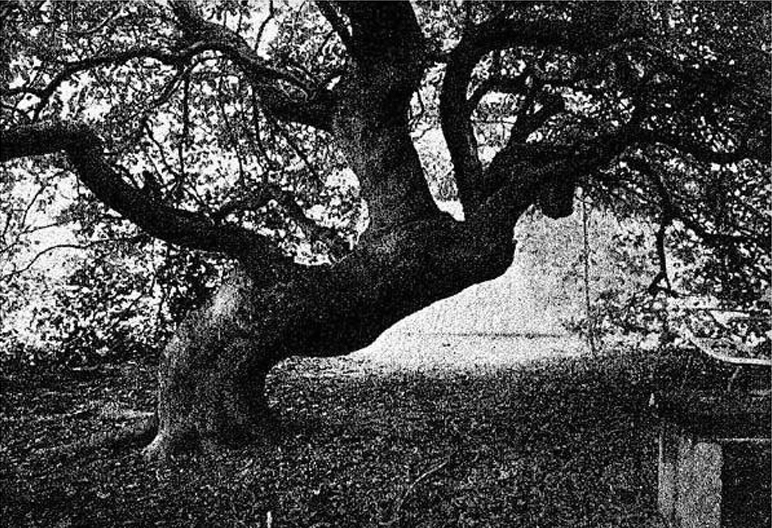
Dwarf beech near Lauenau, 1907.

"On this mountain, both on the top as well as on the slopes, there is a 100–150 year old beech stand on an area of about 600 acres in which all the trunks have an extremely strange growth, that it is worth the effort to describe; because there would probably be few foresters, who have had the opportunity to see a similar growth of the beech on such a significant area."

"All of the trunks have grown more or less crooked that out of the entire stock, in my opinion, not one four foot length piece of straight wood could be split, and they have a crown formation which is similar to the weeping ash. It is not possible to give a faithful description of this strange tree growth without drawings."

By the time Tilemann published his 1842 report with four drawings in 1844, the last dwarf beech forest near Hülsede was already cleared.

In the following 160 years, countless essays appeared by botanists and nature lovers full of amazement and perplexity about the odd nature phenomenon.

A 1908 report by A. Oppermann with over 100 photos of the "Renkbuchen" ("Tangle beech"), an illustrated natural history presentation of the last specimens growing in the Süntel by W. Wehrhan from 1902, and a description of the "Tilly-Buche" by Cl. Baroness of Münchhausen from 1911 were frequently cited.

Professor Friedrich Lange studied the morphology of the strange tree from 1966 to 1974 in Bad Münder and at the University of Göttingen. He described the structure and growth of the plant and the stages of development of the unusual growth form, but he could not find the actual reason for it.

Franz Gruber from the University of Göttingen examined the growth and age of the largest dwarf beeches in 2001 and 2002 and made an important contribution to determining the age of these trees, which are mostly overestimated in this regard. (See Literature: Gruber 2002)
