= Faux de Verzy =

Type of dwarf tree

A Fau de Verzy is either a dwarf beech (Fagus sylvatica variety tortuosa), a dwarf oak tree, or a dwarf chestnut tree. These grow in the forest of Verzy, 25 km south of Reims in France. In this forest are less than a thousand dwarf beeches, some dozen dwarf oaks and some dwarf chestnuts (see Biology below), but this article speaks in the main about dwarf beeches.

== Etymology and toponymy ==
The word fau designated the beech in Old French (the plural was faux); this word came from the Latin fagus, now the French word for beech is hêtre . These trees therefore give the name, Les Faux de Verzy, to the touristic area located in France 25 km south of Reims in Marne where the world’s largest concentration of dwarf beeches stands with about a thousand trees.

== The dwarf beeches (The faux) ==
They are not more than 4 or 5 metres (13 or 16 ft) high. In summer, they spread their leaves like heavy sun umbrellas; some looking like leaf igloos. In winter, their tortuous shape can be seen naked: trunks and branches are crooked, bent, twisted and pendulous to the ground. Such dwarf beeches are also known in other places: in Germany (in the Süntel area, not far from Hanover), in Sweden (at Dalby Söderskog National Park near Malmö, not far from the northern limit for this species), in Denmark, and in another place in France (in Lorraine). Nobody knows whether these plantings have the same origin or not. But there are too few such beeches in these two places to feel confident about the future of their population. The situation is healthier around the dwarf beeches of Verzy, especially now that the construction of a pathway enables visitors to admire them without making harmful trampling on the ground over the fragile roots. A fenced reserve also enables the preservation of a part of the population. With more than 1,000 dwarf beeches, the National Forest of Verzy is the world's principal reserve of dwarf beeches. Among them, the most specific ones were given a name inspired by their peculiar shapes:

•the umbrella Fau,

•the Fau of the bride,

•the ox-head Fau,

•the Fau of the Young Lady (the legend says that Joan of Arc came and had a rest in this forest).

This area has been listed at a national level since 1932.

== Pictures gallery ==
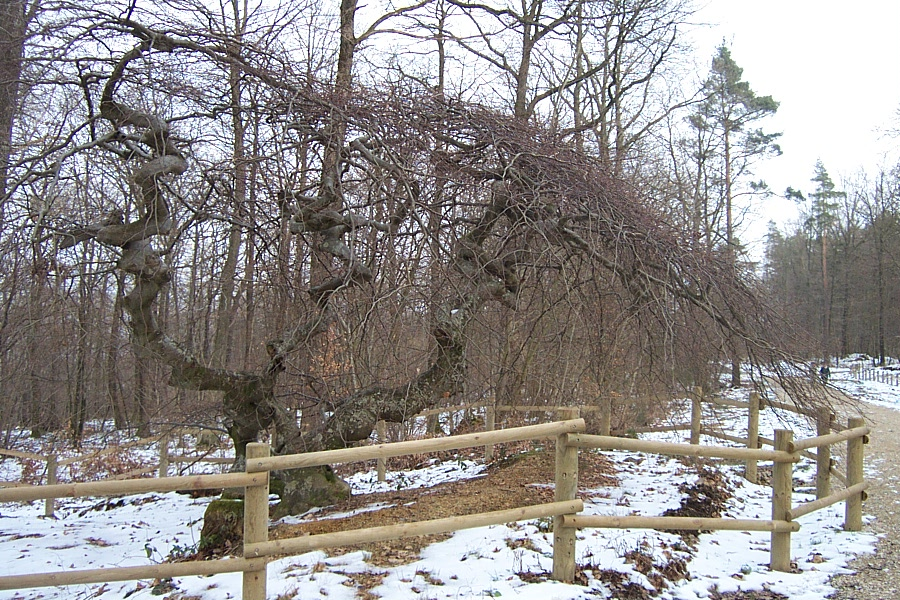
A fau of Verzy in winter

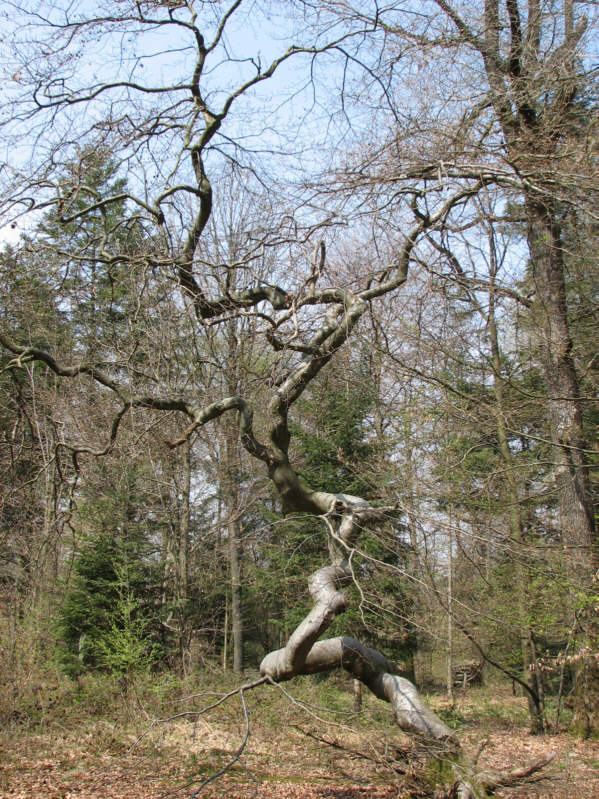
... in spring

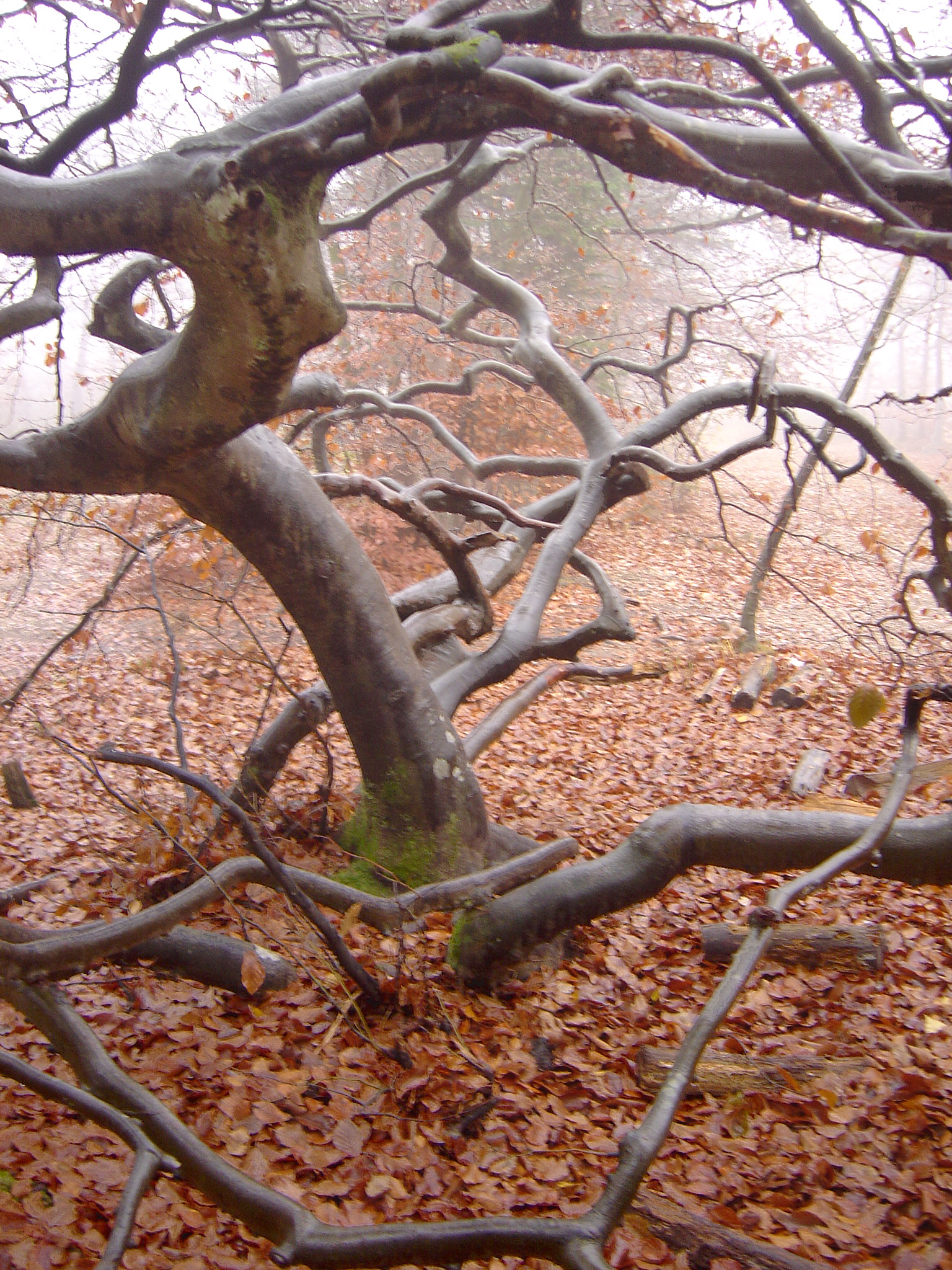
... in autumn

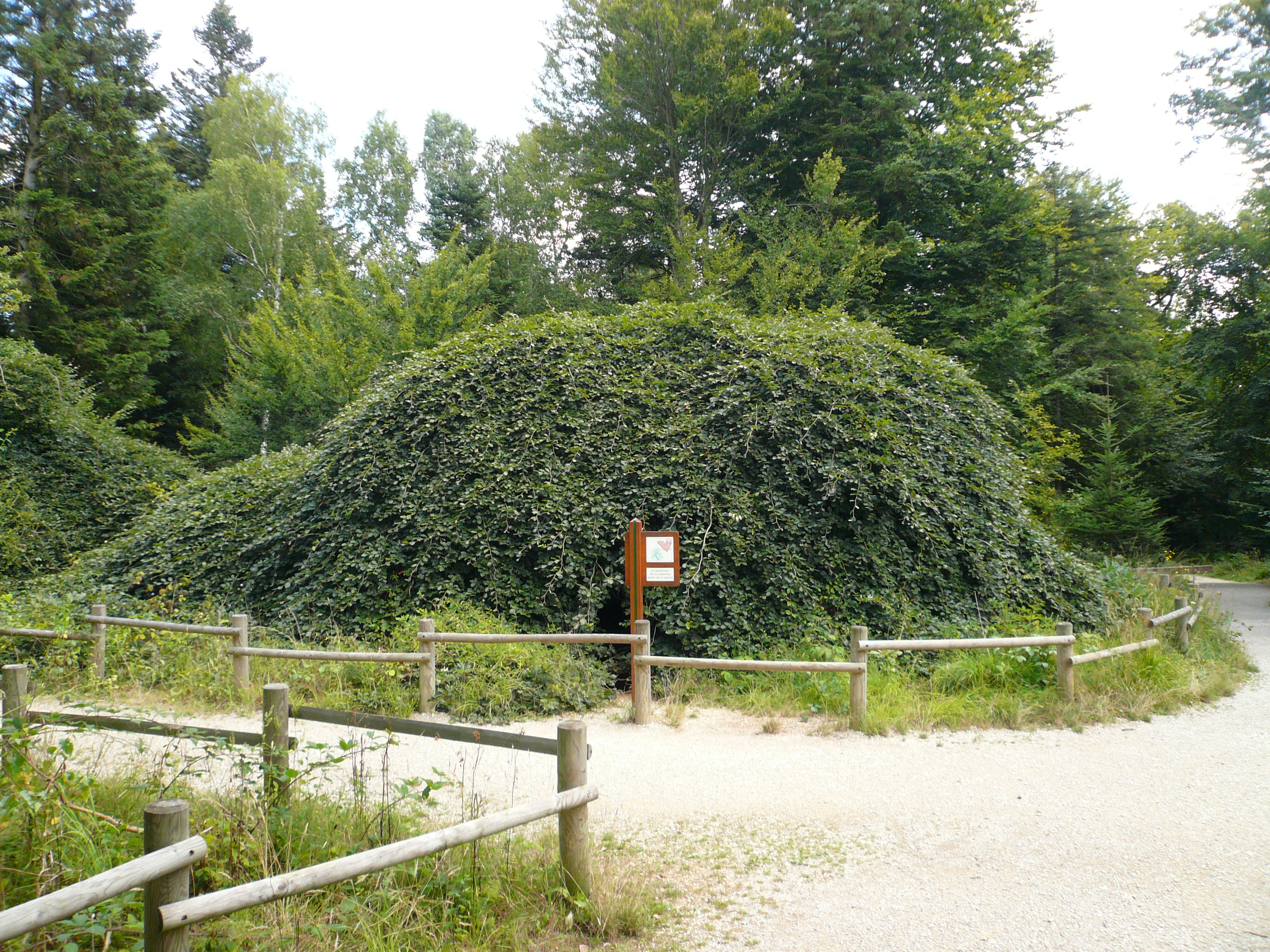
... in summer

== History ==
A mass of speculation, from far-fetched to more credible, but often scientifically unfounded, have been put forward to explain the origin of the Faux of Verzy. It is known that there were already some “Faux” in the forest of Verzy thanks to old books written in the abbey of St-Basle during the 6th century.

The monks may have increased their number by layering and then by transplanting them in the forest to make a kind of “botanical garden”. These monks were great travellers and, according to Y. Bernard they may have brought back a treasured young plant from an eastern area that they were passing through for evangelizing.

A dwarf beech called abre des Dames (abre standing for arbre meaning tree, and dame meaning fairy at that time) which together gives ‘’the tree of the fairies’’ stood in the south of Domrémy-la-Pucelle, the native village of Joan of Arc. This beech was already one hundred years old at that time; it was venerated because of its beauty and was the subject of rural worship: a procession used to walk there every year to chase away the bad spirits.

During Joan of Arc’s trial of rehabilitation (1450-1456), 11 witnesses spoke about this very tree as if it was an essential piece of information.

It was said that when going with Charles VII of France to the abbey of St Basle, Joan of Arc climbed up in the branches of a fau at Verzy and sat down. True or not, the story shows the swarm of legends which had surrounded these dwarf beeches that still are a mystery for the scientists.

== Biology ==
The dwarf beech trees belong to the family Fagaceae as the usual common beech trees do. Their distinctive features are, apart from their shape:

- their life expectancy. Not up to 800 years as it was claimed, but tree rings counts reached 350 at Verzy.
- their capability of anastomosis (self welding of branches, even between different beeches and trees of different species as oaks).
- their easiness in natural layering.
- their seeds are rare and their rate of germination is lower than 10%. Furthermore, only 40% of these 10% will be dwarf beeches.

A genetic mutation is now the most probable hypothesis to explain the dwarf aspect of these trees. This mutation may have occurred spontaneously or could have been introduced by a pathogenic agent centuries ago, the mutation would be stable and hereditary.

Friedrich Lange proposes the hypothesis of a recessive mutation. He based this conclusion on the appearance inside a forest of common beech trees in the neighborhood of an old colonisation of disappeared dwarf beech trees of spontaneous seedling of dwarf trees. According to Lange, that is an out turn of the recessive characteristic actual in heterozygote coming from a common beech.

The hypothesis of a temporary adaptation (Accommodat in French) due to the local environment, still frequently in favour in the area, can’t be taken on because this adaptation is not genetically stable; the dwarf beeches, when they are transplanted from Verzy to other environments or when they are grafted on a common beech tree keep their dwarf tree aspect.

The earth of Verzy is poor for agriculture. Could this have led to a lineage of a distinct phenotype? No, because many beeches there are not dwarf beeches.

The hypothesis of a pathogen which may have induced a mutation is compatible with the fact that there are some dwarf oak trees Quercus petraea and some dwarf chest nut trees Castanea sativa or sweet chestnut.

Nevertheless, the photonic and electronic analysis with transmission carried out by J. C. Audran in 1985 failed in discovering an active presence of virus or of mollicutes (a class of small bacteria).

Year after year, even stranger trees are found in this area; these ones look globally as dwarf beech trees but with a branch growing as it would do in a common beech tree. These stranger trees seem to be more frequent, they are called chimera beech trees.

In 1998, by comparing the DNA coming from common beech trees, dwarf beech trees from Verzy, common purple beech trees and purple dwarf beech trees from the Süntel, Anita Gallois working in the laboratory of biology and plant physiology in Reims University brought to light that these morphological differences are indeed there because of a genetic factor, a result that confirms the hypothesis of a mutation.

== Tourism and prospect ==
These dwarf beeches have been taken care of for decades. The Süntel area is not much visited and it expands thanks to replantations and graftings. This area of Verzy belongs to the French National Forests Office and thus is visited by hundreds of thousands of tourists every year who were a threat for the survival of this variety. The forest path was diverted to turn the visitors towards some dozens of specimens protected by barriers. This low strain brought by this protection plan is justified by the pleasure to pass on these natural beauties to the future generations. Explanatory boards explain walkers-by about the importance of the safeguard of such a natural heritage.

The National Institute of Agricultural Research and the Nancy botanical and gardens conservatory collect beechnuts for future uses. The laboratory in plant biology of the University of Reims Champagne-Ardenne proceeds in vitro micropropagations.

In the Arènes de Lutèce, in the 5th arrondissement of Paris, stands a 2 meter high dwarf beech tree belonging to the same species; it was planted in 1905.

== Bibliography ==
- GALLOIS A., M. BURRUS AND S. BROWN. . “Evaluation of the nuclear DNA content and GC percent in four varieties of Fagus sylvatica”. Ann. For. Sci. 56 (1999) 615-618
- GALLOIS A., J. C. AUDRAN AND M. BURRUS : “Assessment of genetic relationships and population discrimination among Fagus sylvatica L. by RAPD”. Theoretical and Applied Genetics, Volume 97, Numbers 1-2, 211-219, https://doi.org/10.1007%2Fs001220050887
