= Wilkening =

Wilkening is a surname. Notable people with the surname include:

- Albert H. Wilkening (1946–2020), American army officer
- Catherine Wilkening (born 1963), French actress
- Laurel L. Wilkening (1944–2019), American planetary scientist
- H. Martin R. Wilkening (born 1977), German natural scientist
- Fritz Wilkening (1926-2016), German educational Scientist
