= Hohe Egge (Süntel) =

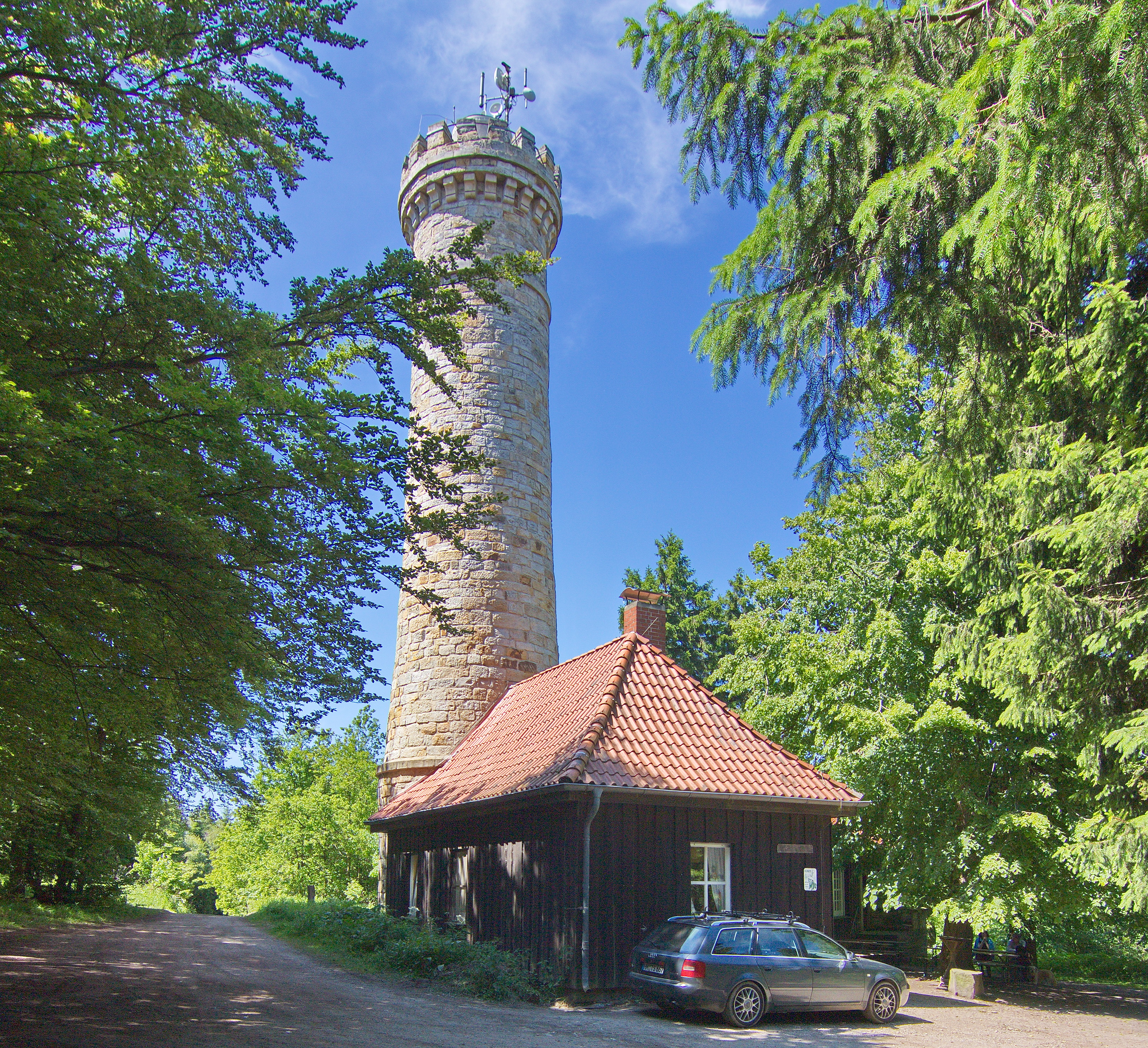

Highest point
- Elevation: 440 m above sea level (NN) (1,440 ft)
- Prominence: 310 m ↓ Domäne Dahle, Deisterpforte → Hils
- Isolation: 20.7 km → Thüster Berg
- Coordinates: 52°10′17″N 9°23′01″E

Geography
- Location within Lower Saxony
- Location: Lower Saxony, Germany
- Parent range: Süntel, Weser Uplands

The Hohe Egge, at a good 440 m above NN, is the highest point on the Süntel ridge in the Calenberg Uplands in the German federal state of Lower Saxony. On its summit is the Süntel Tower.

The Hohe Egge or Süntel, with its topographic prominence of 300 metres, is one of the most prominent hills and ridges in North Germany.
