= Süntel =

Mountain range in Germany

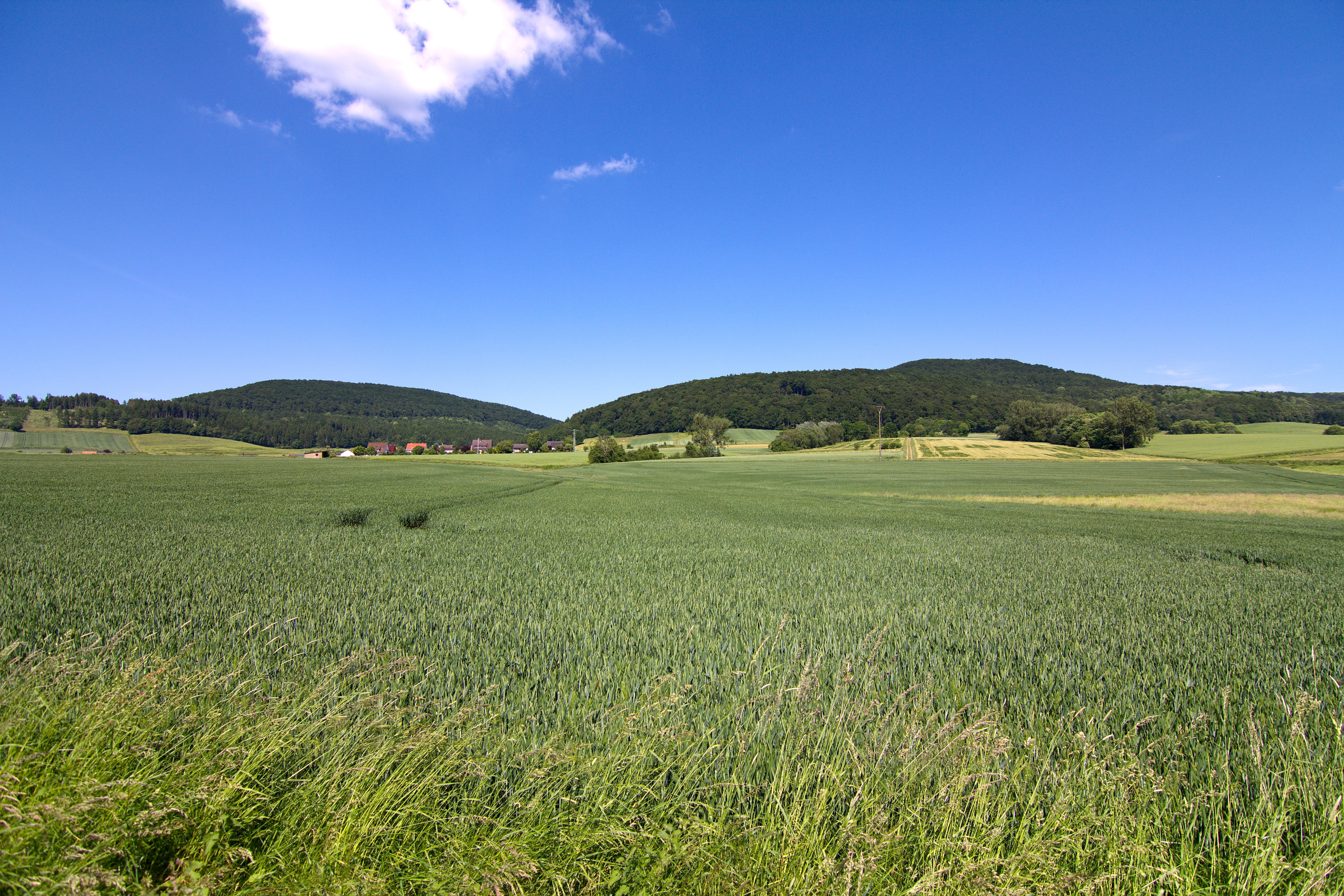
- The Süntel seen from the L423 road

Highest point
- Peak: Hohe Egge
- Elevation: 440 m
- Coordinates: 52°12′N 9°21′E

Dimensions
- Length: 10 km (6.2 mi)

Geography
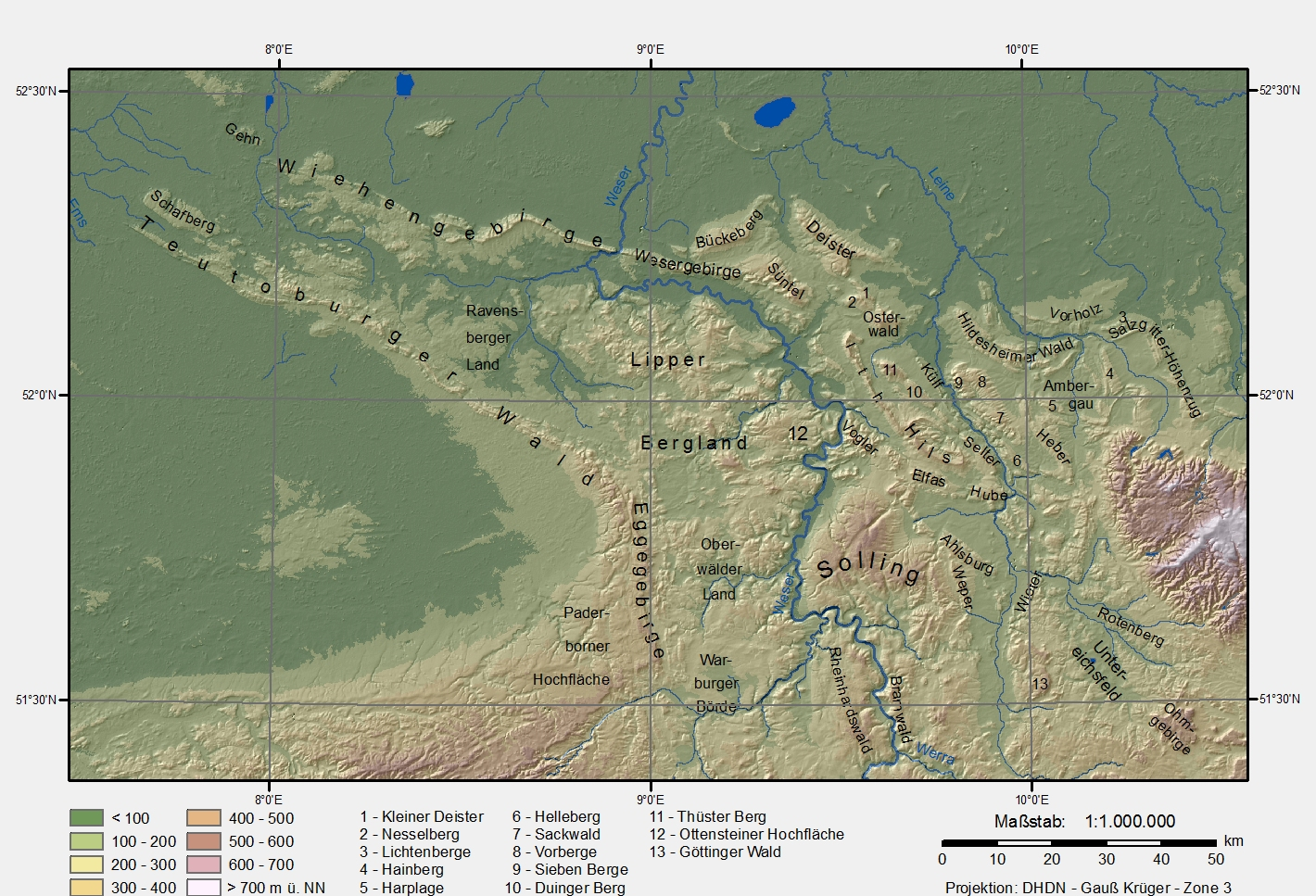
- Map of the Low Saxon Hills
- Location: Lower Saxony, Germany

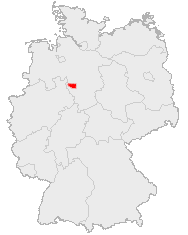
The Süntel hills

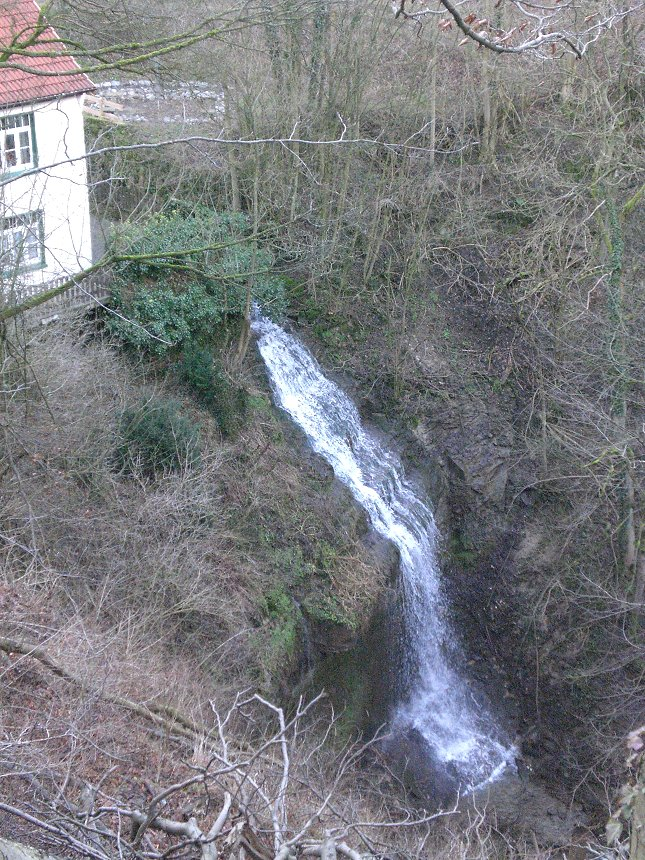
Langenfeld Waterfall (at 15 m the highest natural waterfall in Lower Saxony)

The Süntel is a massif in the German Central Uplands that is up to 437.5 m above sea level (NN). It forms part of the Weser Uplands in Lower Saxony southwest of Hanover and north of Hamelin.

== Geographical location ==
The Süntel is the eastern extension of the Wesergebirge and runs for about 12 km from northwest to southeast. It is surrounded by the valleys of the Aue, Deister-Süntel and Weser. It is also part of the Weser Uplands Schaumburg-Hamelin Nature Park and the Calenberg Uplands. The Hohenstein hill and its immediate vicinity are a nature reserve.

== Geology ==
=== General ===
The southeastern part of the Süntel, including the Hohe Egge, consists mainly of Wealden sandstone from the Lower Cretaceous period as well as small anthracite deposits. Its northwestern part, including the Hohenstein with its 350 m long and 50 to 60 m high crags, comprises limestone of the Upper Jurassic period, the Corallian oolith.

=== Features ===
The main geological features of the Süntel are:

- The giant hill caves near Langenfeld, the largest dripstone cave in Lower Saxony,
- The Schillat Caves, open to visitors to look around,
- The two highest, natural, waterfalls in Lower Saxony at the Höllenmühle near Langenfeld at the head of the valley of the rocky Höllengrund and
- The Hohenstein plateau north of Hessisch Oldendorf with rock faces and deep clefts.

== History ==
- Historically interesting is the Dachtelfeld, a plateau over 100 hectares (250 acres) in area and up to 350 m above NN. In 782 Saxon rebels annihilated part of the Frankish occupation troops, a defeat which was avenged in the same year by Charlemagne at the Massacre of Verden.
- The Hohenstein is an old Germanic cult site dedicated to the god, Donar. Many ancient legends surround this hill and its rock outcrops: the Hirschsprung, Grüner Altar and Teufelskanzel.
- On the Amelungsberg there are still the ruins of a medieval fort and a Stone Age megalith.
- From more recent times there are traces of the coal mine in the southeastern part of the Süntel near Bad Münder.
- Between 1933 and 1938 the town of Hamelin erected the Horst-Wessel Monument, subsequently blown up
- There is a US radar station on the Hohe Egge in the Süntel and a NATO depot near Hülsede

== Flora and fauna ==
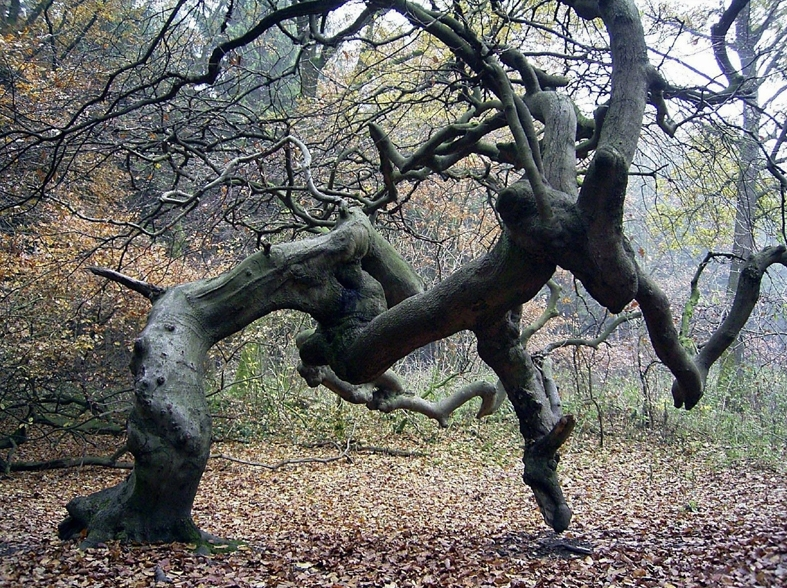
Dwarf beech (Süntel-Buche) on the Dachtelfeld

The Süntel is covered by mixed woods which are dominated by beech, but also has other species such as oak, spruce, hornbeam and coast Douglas-fir and rarer types like the yew and wild service tree. A botanic rarity is the dwarf beech (known in German as the Süntel-Buche or "Süntel beech") of which there are about a dozen old examples still in the Süntel (at Dachtelfeld and Bleeksgrund). The last great dwarf beech wood on the Westeregge was almost completely cleared in 1843. In addition there are numerous, rare species of flower such as varieties of Primula, spring snowflake, horseshoe vetch, hart's-tongue fern, spleenwort, lady's slipper, heath spotted orchid, etc.

In addition to roe deer and wild boar there are also mouflon wild sheep in the Süntel. Rarer sights are the barn owl, kestrel, black woodpecker and pine marten. The black stork is occasionally seen on the southern slopes.

== Economy and tourism ==
In addition to forestry and tourism quarrying plays an important role in the Süntel. Süntel sandstone was used for many notable buildings in the area such as the Rat Catcher's House in Hamelin, Barntrup Castle, Schwöbber Castle and Hämelschenburg Castle. Limestone from the quarries near Pötzen, Segelhorst, Langenfeld and Hamelspringe is used in road construction. The town of Münder had a coal mine in the Süntel that operated for about half a century from 1809.

In the Süntel, as well as hiking trails with views over the valleys, there are also long, straight, rather monotonous forest tracks without any signs. The Hohenstein crags provide a training ground for rock climbers and mountaineers.

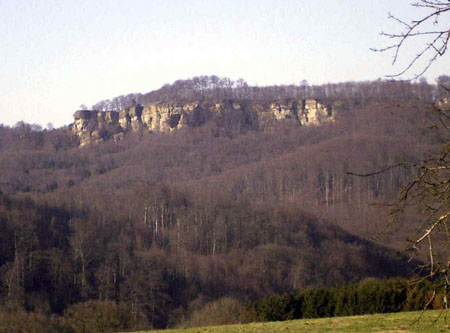
The Hohenstein in the Süntel

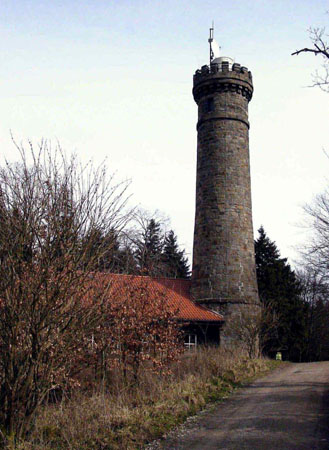
Süntel Tower on the Hohe Egge

== Hills and valleys ==
=== Hills ===
The main hills and elevations of the Süntel are – with heights in metres above Normalnull (NN):

- Hohe Egge (437.5 m) with its Süntel Tower (south) and transmission mast (north; 435.2 m); in the centre of the Süntel
- Bakeder Berg (c. 375 m); southwest of Bakede
- Hoher Nacken (or: Hohenacken; c. 375 m); northeast of Pötzen
- Dachtelfeld (356.0 m); in the centre of the Süntel
- Katzennase (352.7 m); northeast of Hessisch Oldendorf-Haddessen
- Südwehe (c. 350 m)
- Hohenstein (340.5 m); including the Grünem Altar, Teufelskanzel, Hirschsprung and nearby Kreuzstein; between Langenfeld and Zersen
- Amelungsberg (c. 325 m); northeast of Segelhorst
- Borberg (c. 320 m), including the Roter Stein crag; north-northeast of Hessisch Oldendorf-Bensen
- Ramsnacken (c. 320 m), including the Moosköpfe crags; southwest of Langenfeld
- Riesenberg (c. 310 m), with its quarry; south of Langenfeld
- Schrabstein (Schrabst; 300.2 m); between Rohdental and Langenfeld
- Iberg (c. 300 m); between Auetal-Rannenberg and Hessisch Oldendorf-Langenfeld
- Moosköpfe (c. 300 m); southeast of Langenfeld
- Mittelberg (297.0 m); north of Hessisch-Oldendorf-Barksen
- Mattenberg (288.6 m); west of Hamelspringe
- Hasseln (286.5 m)
- Osterberg (260.1 m); northeast of Hessisch Oldendorf-Bensen
- Hünenburg (251.7 m); between Rohdental and Rannenberg
- Westerberg (249.2 m); north of Hessisch Oldendorf-Bensen
- Baumgartenberg (232.1 m); north of Hessisch Oldendorf-Segelhorst
- Hülsebrink (227.2 m); north of Klein Süntel
- Wendgeberg (or: Wenchenberg; c. 223 m), north-northeast of Hessisch Oldendorf-Zersen

=== Valleys ===
The valleys of the Süntel include the:

- Bleeksgrund
- Höllengrund
- Langes Föhrtal
- Schneegrund
- Totental
- Wellergrund

== Towns and villages ==
The towns and villages of the Süntel include:

- Auetal
- Hülsede
- Bad Münder am Deister
- Hessisch Oldendorf
- Hamelin

== Inns ==
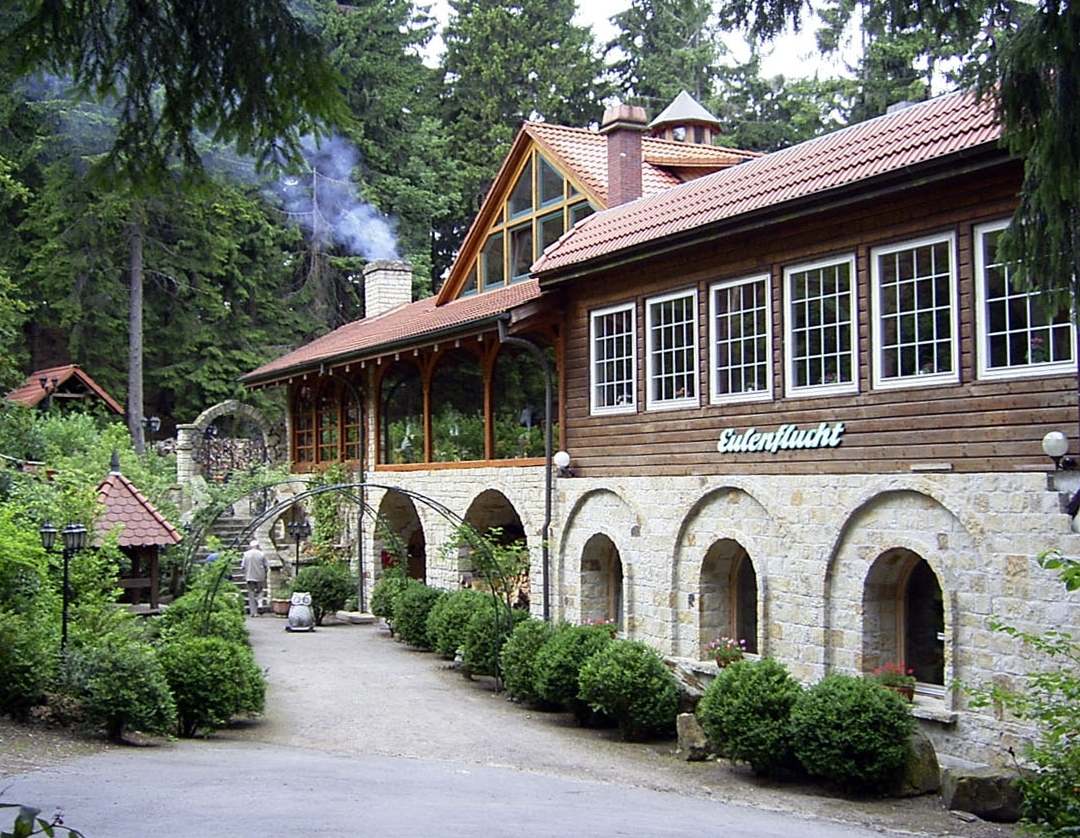
Waldgasthaus Eulenflucht

The forest restaurants in and around the Süntel include the:

- Krackes Ruh, near Hülsede
- Eulenflucht, between Hohe Egge and Hamelspringe (Bad Münder am Deister)
- Bergschmiede, near Bad Münder am Deister
- Süntelturm on the Hohe Egge, near Bad Münder am Deister
- Pappmühle, near Zersen
- Baxmann-Baude, near Zersen
- Weinschänke, in Rohdental

== Literature ==
- Helga Knoke: Wald and Besiedlung im Süntel. Schaumburger Studien Heft 22, Verlag C. Bösendahl Rinteln 1968
- Friedrich Kölling: Die Süntelwaldgenossenschaft. Ein Beitrag zur Rechts- and Wirtschaftsgeschichte einer Schaumburger Markgenossenschaft; Fritz Holstein: Das Statut der Süntelwaldgenossenschaft Bensen. Die forstliche Bewirtschaftung des Süntelwaldes; Scheide: Die Jagd im Süntel. Schaumburger Heimathefte, Heft 10. Bösendahl, Rinteln (Weser) 1962
