= H. Martin R. Wilkening =

German physical chemist

- Born: 1977-04-28; Auetal, Lower Saxony, Germany
- Education: Gottfried Wilhelm Leibniz University Hannover
- Known for: Ionic diffusion in solids, NMR spectroscopy, Conductivity spectroscopy
- Scientific career
- Fields: Solid-state chemistry, Material science, Solid-state ionics
- Workplaces: Graz University of Technology

H. Martin R. Wilkening (born April 28, 1977 in Auetal, Germany) is a German physical chemist. He is a professor at the Graz University of Technology and heads the Institute of Chemistry and Technology of Materials (ICTM).

== Career ==
Wilkening studied chemistry at the Leibniz University Hannover where he also earned his doctorate. His habilitation focused on ultraslow ion transport in solids.

Since 2011, he has been a professor of solid-state chemistry of modern energy storage systems at the Graz University of Technology. From 2012 to 2019, he also led the CD-Lab "Lithium Batteries: Aging Effects, Technology and New Materials". In 2016, he became the head of the Institute of Chemistry and Technology of Materials (ICTM) at TU Graz.

== Research ==
Wilkening's research focuses on ionic diffusion in crystalline and amorphous solids. His group uses techniques such as temperature-dependent nuclear magnetic resonance (NMR) relaxation measurements and broadband conductivity spectroscopy to study ionic transport processes.

He is the author or co-author of over 200 scientific publications.

== Awards ==
In 2006, Wilkening received the Starck Prize from the GDCh Division of Solid-State Chemistry and Materials Science.

In 2009, he was awarded the ADUC Prize of the GDCh (Association of German University Professors of Chemistry).
