= Verzy =

- Commune
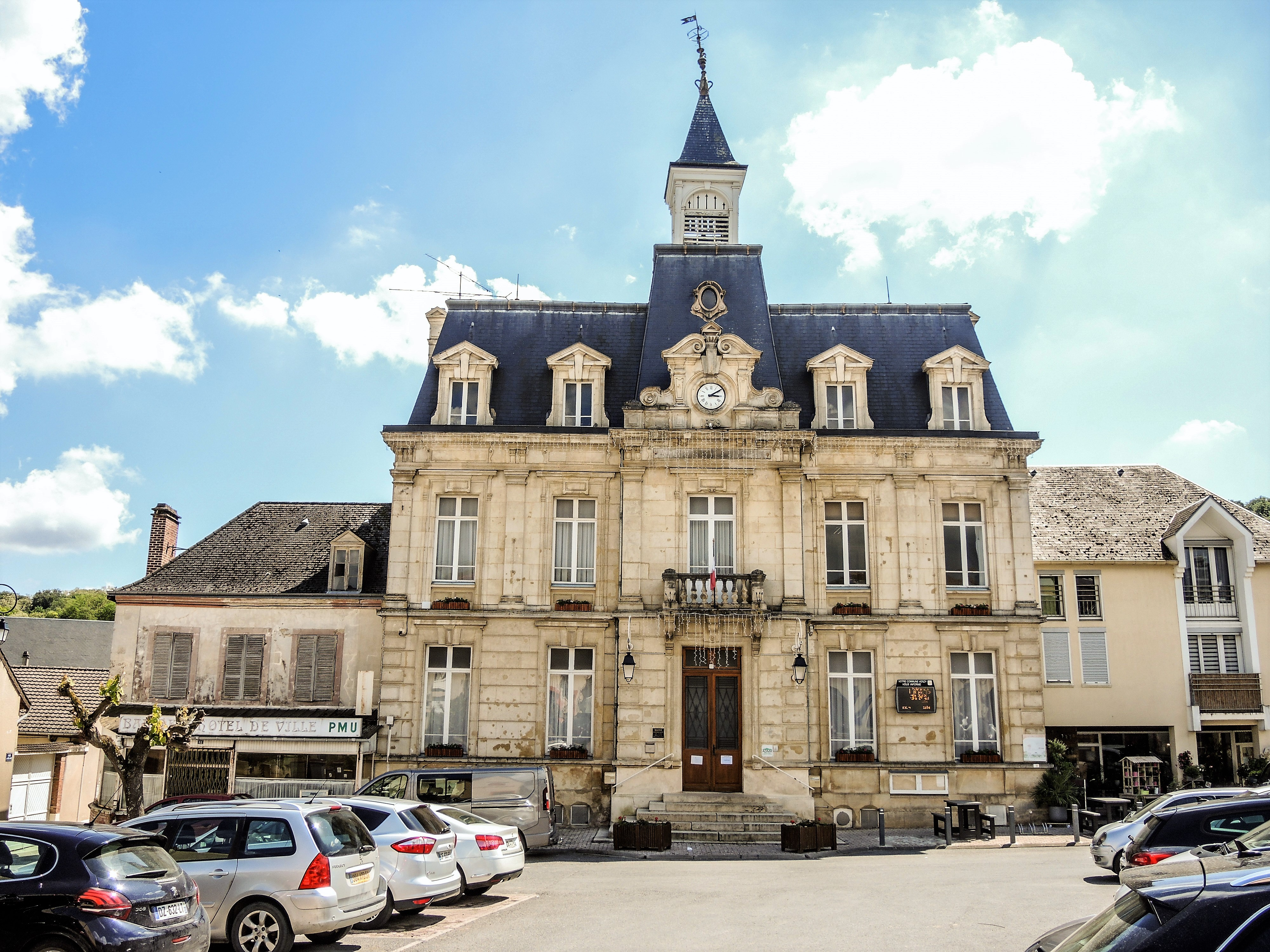
- The town hall in Verzy

- Coat of arms
- Location of Verzy
- Location within France Location within Grand Est
- Coordinates: 49°08′50″N 4°09′52″E
- Country: France
- Region: Grand Est
- Department: Marne
- Arrondissement: Reims
- Canton: Mourmelon-Vesle et Monts de Champagne
- Intercommunality: CU Grand Reims

Government
  - Mayor (2020–2026): Christophe Corbeaux
- Area^{1}: 13.37 km^{2} (5.16 sq mi)
- Highest elevation: 288 m (945 ft)
- Lowest elevation: 98 m (322 ft)
- Population (2023): 961
  - Density: 71.9/km^{2} (186/sq mi)
- Time zone: UTC+01:00 (CET)
  - Summer (DST): UTC+02:00 (CEST)
- INSEE/Postal code: 51614 /51380
- ^{1} French Land Register data, which excludes lakes, ponds, glaciers > 1 km^{2} (0.386 sq mi or 247 acres) and river estuaries.

Verzy (French pronunciation: [vɛʁzi]) is a commune in the Marne department in north-eastern France.

== Champagne ==
The village's vineyards are located in the Montagne de Reims subregion of Champagne, and are classified as Grand Cru (100%) in the Champagne vineyard classification.

== See also ==
- Communes of the Marne department
- Classification of Champagne vineyards
- Montagne de Reims Regional Natural Park
- Faux de Verzy are located in forests about 1 km south west of the village.
