= Weeping beech =

Cultured variety of the deciduous European beech

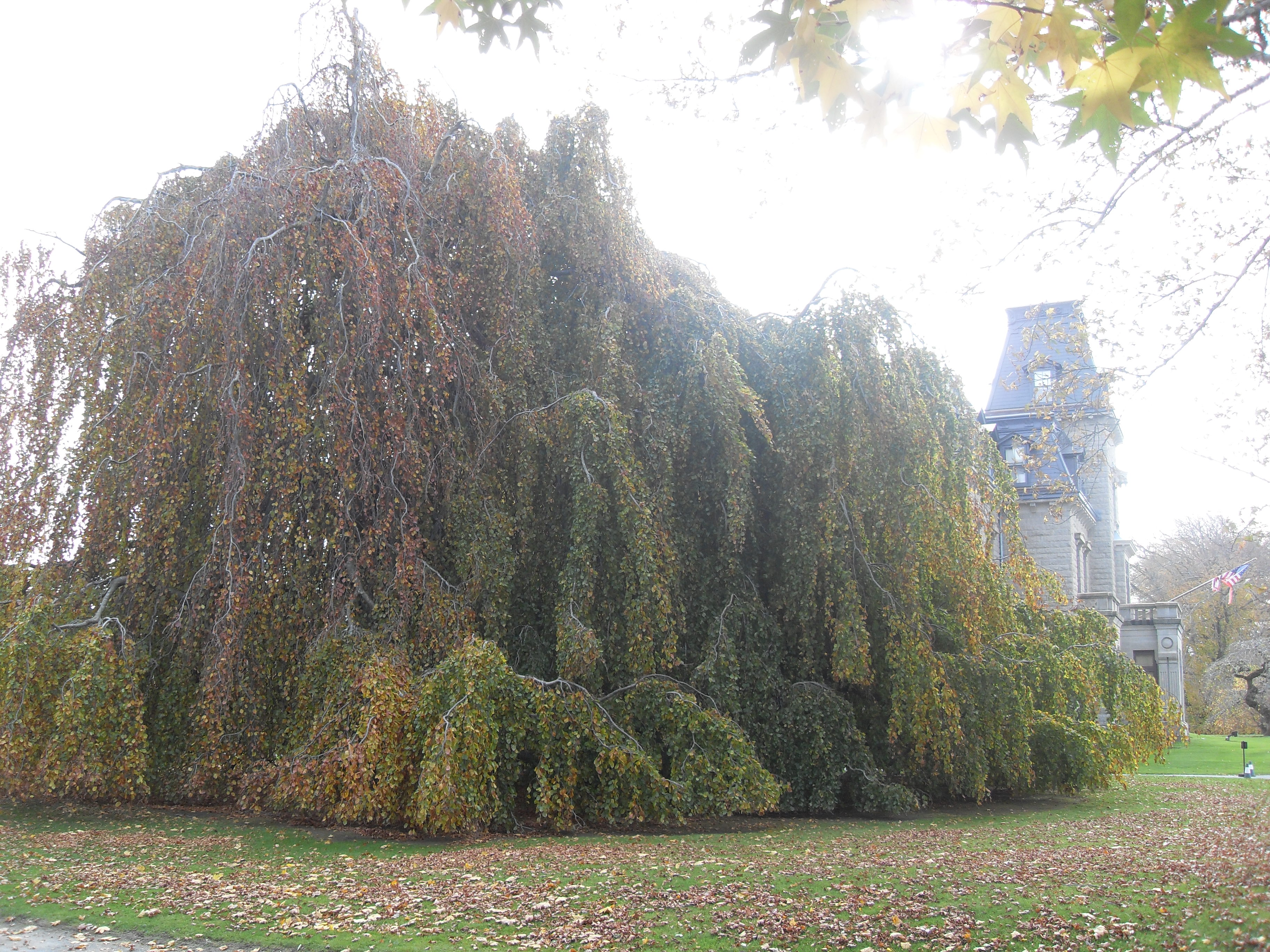
- Weeping beech, Chateau-sur-Mer, Newport, Rhode Island
- Species: Fagus sylvatica
- Cultivar group: Pendula Group

The weeping beech, Fagus sylvatica 'Pendula', is a cultivar of the deciduous European beech. The original tree was found in the grounds of an English park, and it has been propagated by grafting, then many distributed widely.

== Physical description ==
The weeping beech is characterized by its shape with sweeping, pendulous branches. The trunk of the tree may not be visible from a distance due to the presence of the covering "weeping" branches. Branches may reach the ground and start new roots again. Smaller than the common beech, the tree can reach a height of up to 25 metres (82 ft) and tends to be wider than high.

Leaves of the weeping beech are broad, flat, simple and not lobed. They have smooth margins and alternate. They typically measure 5–10 centimetres (2.0–3.9 in) in length. Flowers appear in the spring and are inconspicuous.

The beechnuts sit in a thin spiny husk and are less than 5 cm in diameter. The triangular beech nuts are popular in autumn with birds, mice and squirrels.

The green leaves become copper-toned in the fall. In winter the skeleton of the silvery stem with its branches remains attractive. The purple pigment in the leaves acts like a sunscreen to protect its new leaves, which is particularly important for plants that grow at high altitudes where the sun is fierce.

== Habitat and maintenance ==
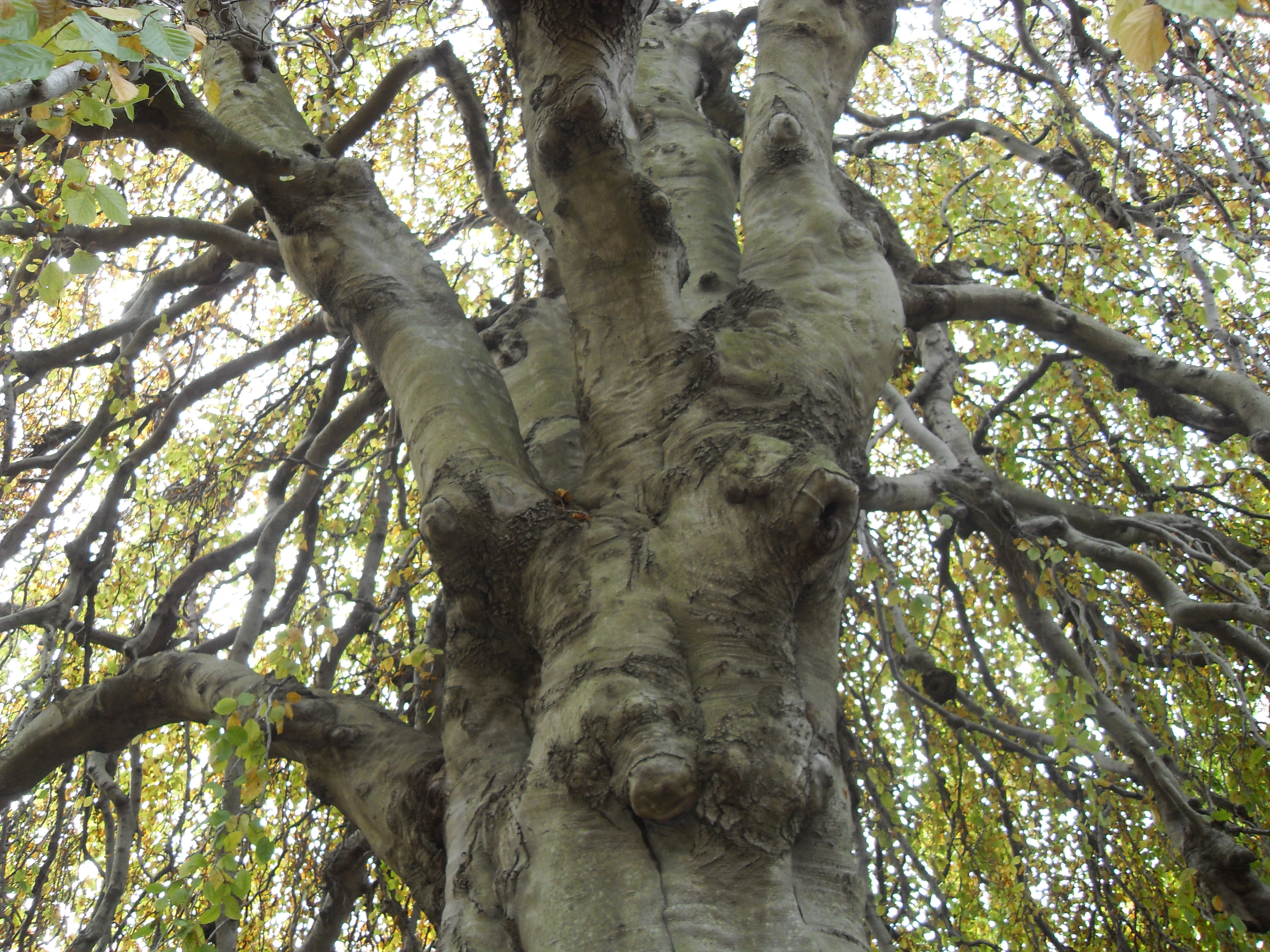
Under the umbrella of a weeping beech

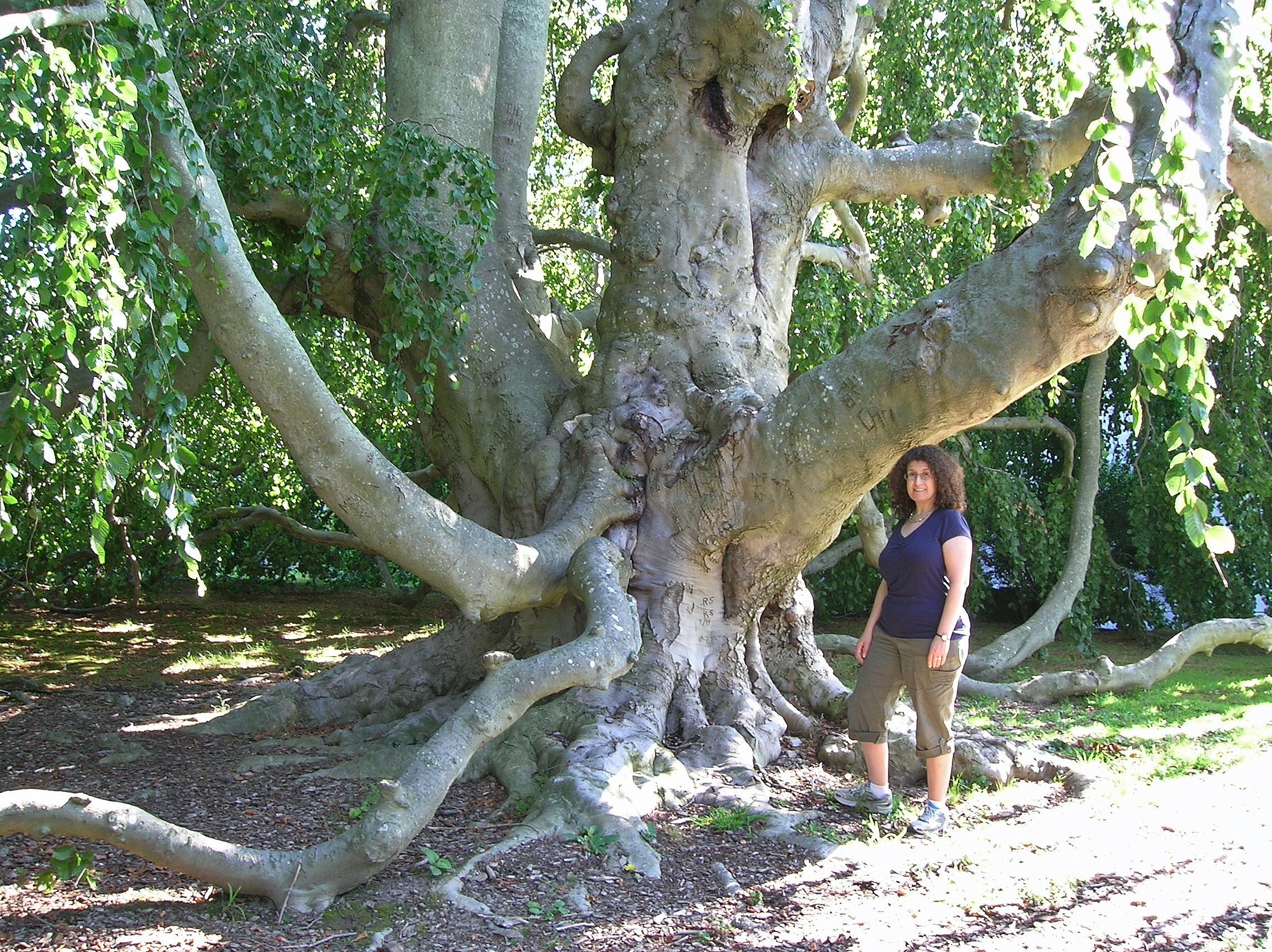
Weeping beech in Newport, Rhode Island (August 2015)

The tree is not native to North America but grows in USDA hardiness zones 4–7. It needs moisture and well drained soil and prefers sunny to semi-shaded zones. The tree does not tolerate industrial pollution or street salt.

Young trees need to be staked to make them grow upward; growth tends to be slow. Weeping beeches may live for 150 to 200 years.

Pests that can attack the tree includes aphids, borers (flat-headed apple tree borer, two-lined chestnut borer), certain caterpillars, and fungal disease.
