= Hülsede =

- Municipality
- Coat of arms

- Location of Hülsede within Schaumburg district
- Interactive map of Hülsede
- Location within Germany Location within Lower Saxony
- Coordinates: 52°15′N 9°22′E
- Country: Germany
- State: Lower Saxony
- District: Schaumburg
- Municipal assoc.: Rodenberg
- Subdivisions: 3

Government
  - Mayor: Herbert Weibels (SPD)

Area
  - Total: 15.86 km^{2} (6.12 sq mi)
- Elevation: 103 m (338 ft)

Population (2025-12-31)
  - Total: 1,016
  - Density: 64.06/km^{2} (165.9/sq mi)
- Time zone: UTC+01:00 (CET)
  - Summer (DST): UTC+02:00 (CEST)
- Postal codes: 31867
- Dialling codes: 05043
- Vehicle registration: SHG
- Website: www.rodenberg.de

Hülsede is a municipality in the district of Schaumburg, in Lower Saxony, Germany.

== Places of interest ==
- Hülsede Water Castle
