= Auetal =

- Municipality
- Coat of arms

- Location of Auetal within Schaumburg district
- Interactive map of Auetal
- Location within Germany Location within Lower Saxony
- Coordinates: 52°14′02″N 9°14′14″E
- Country: Germany
- State: Lower Saxony
- District: Schaumburg
- Subdivisions: 16

Government
  - Mayor (2021–26): Jörn Lohmann (CDU)

Area
  - Total: 62.15 km^{2} (24.00 sq mi)
- Elevation: 192 m (630 ft)

Population (2025-12-31)
  - Total: 5,979
  - Density: 96.20/km^{2} (249.2/sq mi)
- Time zone: UTC+01:00 (CET)
  - Summer (DST): UTC+02:00 (CEST)
- Postal codes: 31749
- Dialling codes: 05752, 05753
- Vehicle registration: SHG
- Website: www.auetal.de

Auetal (German pronunciation: [ˈaʊəˌtaːl], lit. 'Aue Valley') is a municipality in the district of Schaumburg, in Lower Saxony, Germany. It is situated approximately 10 km south of Stadthagen, and 22 km east of Minden. Its seat is in the village Rehren.

The coat of arms features an image of the Tilly-Buche, (1739-1994) a dwarf beech tree which existed in the area.
